= Zhuang customs and culture =

The Zhuang have a rich variety of customs and culture.

== Festivals ==
"Sam Nyied Sam" the 3rd day of the 3rd month of the Chinese lunar calendar is one of the main festivals of the Zhuang celebrated by singing, dancing, games, and special food. At this time traditionally young men and women sing antiphonal songs to each other.

- festival of the ancestor sacrifice of the 7th lunar month
- the Duanwu medicine festival
- Buffalo King Festival - celebrated in Niutouzhai Village, Wenshan County, where there is a Buffalo King Temple. The Zhuang have long worshipped the water buffalo.
- Bullfighting festival
- Firstfruits Festival
- Zhuang children's festival; dates chosen by each individual village

== Stories ==
The Zhuang peoples of Yunnan and Guangxi have a rich tradition of written and unwritten stories. Zhuang folk stories often take the form of songs. There are various folk tales, myths, legends, and historical poems and chants. For over one thousand years they have used Sawndip to write a wide variety of literature, including folk songs, operas, poems, scriptures, letters, contracts, and court documents.

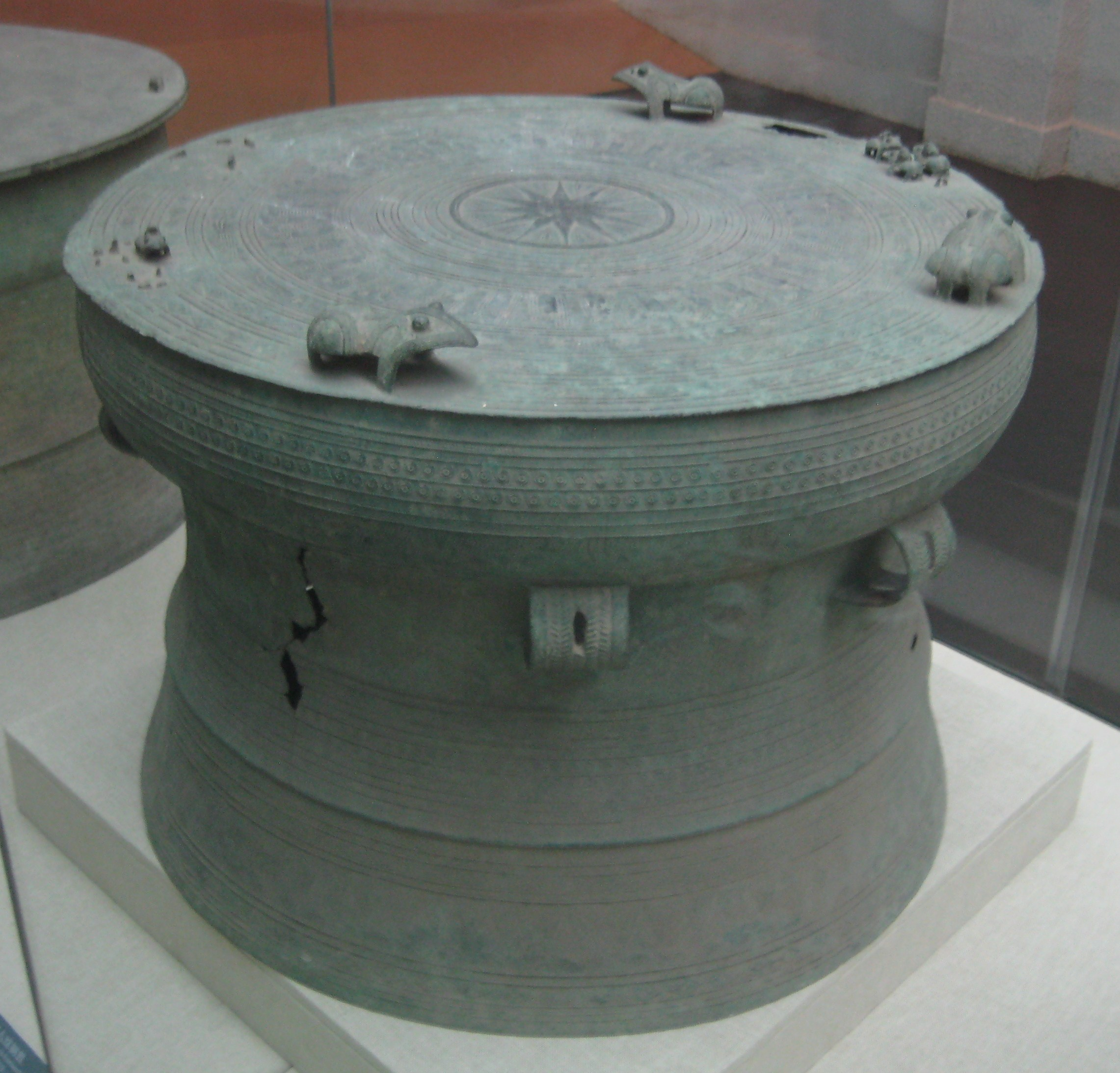
Zhuang bronze drum

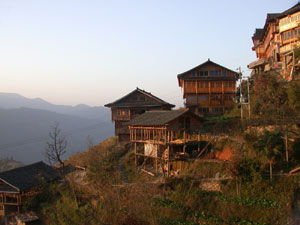
Zhuang stilt houses

There are many stories that are a thousand years old, or older. One, a fairy tale which has attracted much attention in recent years, is "The orphan girl and the rich girl." It is an early version of the story Cinderella (Zhuang "Dahgyax Dahbengz" Dah - indicates female, gyax means orphan and bengz means rich). It is found in Zhuang opera scripts. A 9th century Chinese translation of a Zhuang story entitled Ye Xian was written in the Miscellaneous Morsels from Youyang and the Sawndip versions we now have are quite similar. Analysis suggests these versions took shape no later than the 10th century. "The house-raising song" has been sung for over a thousand years. This song has two parts. The first part describes the construction of a traditional stilt house, and the second part describes customs to ward off evil from the new home. "The Origin of the Bronze Drum" tells of the origins of bronze drums that are like "stars" (such drums have a star in the middle of them), that they are as many as the stars of the sky and like stars can ward off evil spirits.

The Zhuang have their own scriptures written in poetical form such as the Baeu Rodo about the creation of the world.

As well as indigenous stories many stories from other peoples such as the Han Chinese have become part of the Zhuang literary tradition. Whilst the original Chinese opera of "The Legend of Wenlong" has been lost, the story has been preserved in Zhuang texts.

- "The cutting down the banana tree song" ("Kau Tam Gvoa")
- "The song of the origin of bronze" ("Gvau Dong")
- "The rice paddy-planting song"
- "Village visitation songs"
- "Wine banquet songs"
- "The national partition song"
- "Banlong and Banli"
- Poems of the Poya Songbook
- "The escape from marriage song"
- "Yiluo and Diling"
- "Buloakdvo"
- "Tea origin songs"
- Swqmo: records of Zhuang history, ethnic relations, astronomy, farming technology, literary arts, religious beliefs, customs and traditions, and so on.

== Folk arts ==
Zhuang folk arts include music and dance:

=== Music ===
- Masa classical music: classical orchestras of Masa Village, Maguan County, Yunnan
- Zhuang ceremonial music
- Bawu: a type of Zhuang folk music dating back to ancient times
- Mubala: ancient Zhuang wind instrument
- Huqin: stringed instrument made from a water buffalo horn or horse bone; may be two-stringed or four-stringed
- Svaeu'na toasting they dance and sing

=== Dances ===
There are many types of Zhuang dance.

- bronze drum dance
- straw man dance
- water buffalo dance (longh yah vaiz)
- paper horse dance
- hand towel dance
- sun (tang'vaenz) dance

== Handicrafts ==
Traditional Zhuang folk handicrafts includes the following.

- bird totem hats
- elephant trunk shoes reflecting Zhuang elephant worship
- totem back carriers, consisting of fish, bird, and abstract symbolic designs
- cloth monkey medicine bags
- embroidered balls
- spinning tops
- Ai nyeauh: teeter-totter; the ai nyaeuh gvaen is a more complex variant
- wood prints
- paper
- traditional waterwheels
- traditional brocades and weavings
- silver jewelry
- straw mats
- bamboo basket weaving
- rattan
- Paeng'vae: a type of linen made of grass leaves and hemp fibers, made by weaving the two 90 degrees with each other

== Religion ==
Most Zhuang follow traditional animist practices known as Mo or Shigong which include elements of ancestor worship. The Mo have their own sutra and professional priests known as Bu Mo who traditionally use chicken bones for divination. In Mo, the creator is known as Bu Luotuo and the universe is tripartite, with all things composed from the three elements of heaven, earth, and water.

There are also a number of Buddhists, Taoists, and Christians among the Zhuang.

- sacrificing to the field deity
- mountain sacrifices
- worshipping Zoa'nongz, the god of the ndoang (forest)
- sacrifices to Zoachu, the sun deity and original ancestor spirits now living in trees of ancient forests
- sacrifices to the mother tree or mih maix (among the Dai or Tu of Wenshan)
- Longdvaen festival: theatric performances in Guichao Township, Funing County
- Opening the seedlings' door ceremony: a healthy, beautiful girl is chosen to plant the first seedling
- Ceremony for repelling insects: insects are loaded onto paper boats, which are floated away in the water while drums and gongs are beaten
- Sacrifices to Nong Zhigao in the 6th and 7th lunar months; purple-dyed glutinous rice is offered, and sometimes cattle
- offerings to the sun: In Shangguo Village, Xichou County, Zhuang women bathe in the river, put on their traditional clothing and headdresses, and then make offerings to the sun with yellow glutinous rice, which they carry up Sun Mountain.
- Sky Sacrifices: practiced in Bahao (Pya'Kau), Guangnan County, which a wooden hall on Bozhe Mountain is dedicated for
- hvaeng ting Svaeu (townhall shrine) sacrifices: in Guima Village, Guangnan County
- sweeping the village to chase away evil
- sacrifice to the song immortal: shrine in Ake Village, Guangnan County
- reception of the Princess Huanggu
- sacrifices to bronze drums
- Paeng'zong: banners hung during sacrifice ceremonies for funerals
- Paengban: long banners hung during sacrifice ceremonies to repel evil
- Paengsaeh: banners hung during animal sacrifices for religious ceremonies

== Language ==
The Zhuang languages are a group of mutually unintelligible languages of the Tai family, heavily influenced by nearby dialects of Chinese. The Standard Zhuang language is based on a northern dialect but few people learn it, therefore Zhuang people from different dialect areas use one of a number of Chinese varieties to communicate with each other. According to a 1980s survey, 42% of Zhuang people are monolingual in Zhuang, while 55% are bilingual in Zhuang and Chinese. Whilst according to some semi-official sources "In Guangxi, compulsory education is bilingual in Zhuang and Chinese, with a focus on early Zhuang literacy." in fact only small percentage of schools teach written Zhuang. Zhuang is traditionally written using logograms based on Chinese characters ("Sawndip"), and Standard Zhuang, which was written in Latin script, with a few added Cyrillic letters for tone, between 1957 and 1982, and is now officially written using only Latin letters, even though Sawndip are still more often used in less formal domains. Its Wikipedia is za.wikipedia.org.

== Traditional medicine ==
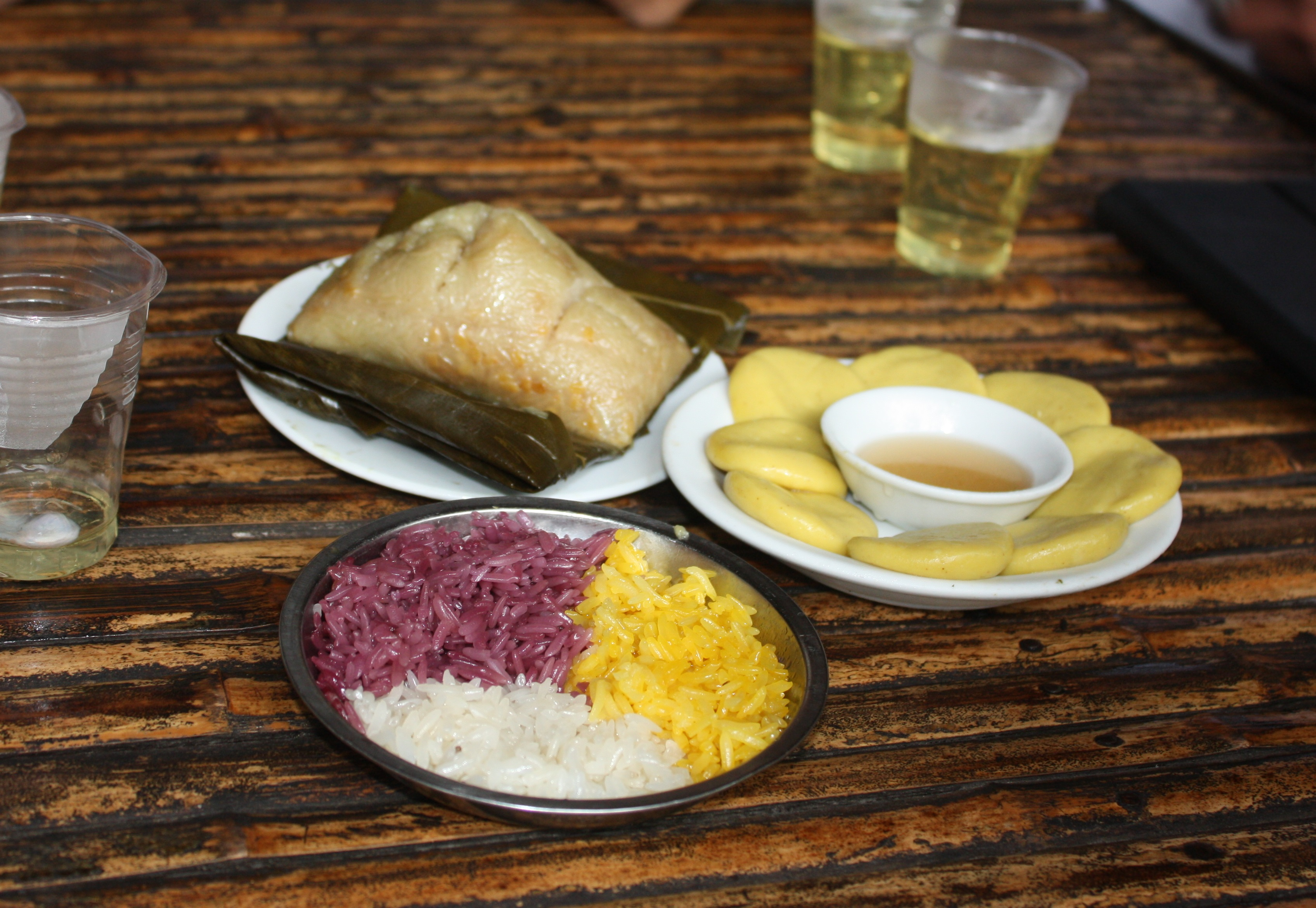
Assorted Zhuang snacks, incl. colored sticky rice and Zhuang style zongzi.

Zhuang folk medicine has a history of over one thousand years. In Sawndip texts thousands of Zhuang medical terms have been identified and some terms have entered into Chinese medical dictionaries, and in Southern China some hospitals have Zhuang Medicine departments.

- Samcaet: the three-seven (Panax notoginseng), which has the Chinese nicknames "not to be exchanged for gold" and "the southern divine herb"
- Laeujyaq: medicinal liquor

== See also ==
- Hmong customs and culture
- Zhuang people
- Dong people
- Sui people
- Yunnan Zhuang customs and culture
