= Zhuang script =

Zhuang script may refer to:

- Old Zhuang script
- Zhuang alphabet
