= Yunnan Zhuang customs and culture =

This article lists the various Zhuang customs and culture of Wenshan Zhuang and Miao Autonomous Prefecture, Yunnan, China (Johnson & Wang 2008).

== Literature ==
The Zhuang peoples of Yunnan and Guangxi have a rich written and unwritten literature (Johnson & Wang 2008).

=== Classic texts of the Zhuang religion Mo ===
- bone carvings as instruments for fortune-telling
- Swqmo: records of Zhuang history, ethnic relations, astronomy, farming technology, literary arts, religious beliefs, customs and traditions, and so on.
- Swqdugzaeq: ("Chicken Divination Scriptures")
- Swqyaq: traditional medicine guides
- Swqlwnz: folk songbooks
- Paeng'zong: banners hung during sacrifice ceremonies for funerals
- Paengban: long banners hung during sacrifice ceremonies to repel evil
- Paengsaeh: banners hung during animal sacrifices for religious ceremonies

=== Folk literature ===
Zhuang folk literature often takes the form of songs. There are various folk tales, myths, legends, and historical poems and chants.

- "The creation of the world hymn"
- "The cutting down the banana tree song" ("Kau Tam Gvoa")
- "The song of the origin of bronze" ("Gvau Dong")
- "The rice paddy-planting song"
- "The house-raising song"
- "Village visitation songs"
- "Wine banquet songs"
- "The national partition song"
- "Banlong and Banli"
- Poems of the Poya Songbook
- "The escape from marriage song"
- "Yiluo and Diling"
- "Buloakdvo"
- "Bronze drum legends"
- "Tea origin songs"
- "The Legend of Wenlong"

== Folk arts ==
Zhuang folk arts include (Johnson & Wang 2008):

=== Music ===
- Masa classical music: classical orchestras of Masa Village, Maguan County, Yunnan
- Zhuang ceremonial music
- Bawu: a type of Zhuang folk music dating back to ancient times
- Mubala: ancient Zhuang wind instrument
- Huqin: stringed instrument made from a water buffalo horn or horse bone; may be two-stringed or four-stringed
- Svaeu'na toasting: playing a suona while balancing a cup of wine to serve to guests

=== Dances ===
- bronze drum dance
- straw man dance
- water buffalo dance (longh yah vaiz)
- paper horse dance
- hand towel dance
- sun (tang'vaenz) dance

== Handicrafts ==
Traditional Zhuang folk handicrafts includes the following (Johnson & Wang 2008).

- bird totem hats
- elephant trunk shoes reflecting Zhuang elephant worship
- totem back carriers, consisting of fish, bird, and abstract symbolic designs
- cloth monkey medicine bags
- embroidered balls
- spinning tops
- Ai nyeauh: teeter-totter; the ai nyaeuh gvaen is a more complex variant
- wood prints
- paper
- traditional waterwheels
- traditional brocades and weavings
- silver jewelry
- straw mats
- bamboo basket weaving
- rattan
- Paeng'vae: a type of linen made of grass leaves and hemp fibers, made by weaving the two 90 degrees with each other

== Folk customs ==
The Zhuang of Wenshan have a colorful variety of folk customs (Johnson & Wang 2008).

- sacrificing to the field deity
- mountain sacrifices
- worshipping Zoa'nongz, the god of the ndoang (forest)
- sacrifices to Zoachu, the sun deity and original ancestor spirits now living in trees of ancient forests
- sacrifices to the mother tree or mih maix (among the Dai or Tu of Wenshan)
- Third Lunar Month Festival; young men and women sing call-and-response songs to each other
- Longdvaen festival: theatric performances in Guichao Township, Funing County
- Opening the seedlings' door ceremony: a healthy, beautiful girl is chosen to plant the first seedling
- Ceremony for repelling insects: insects are loaded onto paper boats, which are floated away in the water while drums and gongs are beaten
- Sacrifices to Nong Zhigao in the 6th and 7th lunar months; purple-dyed glutinous rice is offered, and sometimes cattle
- Buffalo King Festival - celebrated in Niutouzhai Village, Wenshan County, where there is a Buffalo King Temple. The Zhuang have long worshipped the water buffalo.
- offerings to the sun: In Shangguo Village, Xichou County, Zhuang women bathe in the river, put on their traditional clothing and headdresses, and then make offerings to the sun with yellow glutinous rice, which they carry up Sun Mountain.
- Firstfruits Festival
- Sky Sacrifices: practiced in Bahao (Pya'Kau), Guangnan County, which a wooden hall on Bozhe Mountain is dedicated for
- hvaeng ting Svaeu (townhall shrine) sacrifices: in Guima Village, Guangnan County
- sweeping the village to chase away evil
- festival of the ancestor sacrifice of the 7th lunar month
- the Duanwu medicine festival
- sacrifice to the song immortal: shrine in Ake Village, Guangnan County
- reception of the Princess Huanggu
- bullfighting festival
- sacrifices to bronze drums
- sacrifices to Nong Zhigao
- year end festival: practiced among the Bu Dai Zhuang.
- Zhuang children's festival; dates chosen by each individual village

== Traditional medicine ==
- Zang'yaq: Zhuang folk medicine
- Qingcyaeu: the Sanqi (Panax notoginseng), which has the Chinese nicknames "not to be exchanged for gold" and "the southern divine herb"
- Laeujyaq: medicinal liquor

== See also ==
- Hmong customs and culture
- Zhuang people
- Zhuang customs and culture
- Dong people
- Sui people
