= CJK Unified Ideographs Extension F =

- Range: U+2CEB0..U+2EBEF (7,488 code points)
- Plane: SIP
- Scripts: Han
- Assigned: 7,473 code points
- Unused: 15 reserved code points

Unicode Version History
- 10.0 (2017): 7,473 (+7,473)

Unicode documentation
- Code chart ∣ Web page

CJK Unified Ideographs Extension F is a Unicode block containing rare and historic CJK ideographs for Chinese, Japanese, Korean, and Vietnamese, as well as more than a thousand Sawndip characters for writing the Zhuang language, which were submitted to the Ideographic Research Group between 2012 and 2015.

The block has 194 ideographic variation sequences registered in the Unicode Ideographic Variation Database (IVD). These sequences specify the desired glyph variant for a given Unicode character.

== Known issues ==
- U+2DAA2 𭪢 CJK UNIFIED IDEOGRAPH-2DAA2 is an exact duplicate of U+2C0C4 𬃄 CJK UNIFIED IDEOGRAPH-2C0C4 in CJK Unified Ideographs Extension E.

== Block ==
CJK Unified Ideographs Extension F^{[1]}^{[2]} Official Unicode Consortium code chart (PDF)
	0	1	2	3	4	5	6	7	8	9	A	B	C	D	E	F
U+2CEBx	𬺰	𬺱	𬺲	𬺳	𬺴	𬺵	𬺶	𬺷	𬺸	𬺹	𬺺	𬺻	𬺼	𬺽	𬺾	𬺿
U+2CECx	𬻀	𬻁	𬻂	𬻃	𬻄	𬻅	𬻆	𬻇	𬻈	𬻉	𬻊	𬻋	𬻌	𬻍	𬻎	𬻏
U+2CEDx	𬻐	𬻑	𬻒	𬻓	𬻔	𬻕	𬻖	𬻗	𬻘	𬻙	𬻚	𬻛	𬻜	𬻝	𬻞	𬻟
U+2CEEx	𬻠	𬻡	𬻢	𬻣	𬻤	𬻥	𬻦	𬻧	𬻨	𬻩	𬻪	𬻫	𬻬	𬻭	𬻮	𬻯
U+2CEFx	𬻰	𬻱	𬻲	𬻳	𬻴	𬻵	𬻶	𬻷	𬻸	𬻹	𬻺	𬻻	𬻼	𬻽	𬻾	𬻿
U+2CF0x	𬼀	𬼁	𬼂	𬼃	𬼄	𬼅	𬼆	𬼇	𬼈	𬼉	𬼊	𬼋	𬼌	𬼍	𬼎	𬼏
U+2CF1x	𬼐	𬼑	𬼒	𬼓	𬼔	𬼕	𬼖	𬼗	𬼘	𬼙	𬼚	𬼛	𬼜	𬼝	𬼞	𬼟
U+2CF2x	𬼠	𬼡	𬼢	𬼣	𬼤	𬼥	𬼦	𬼧	𬼨	𬼩	𬼪	𬼫	𬼬	𬼭	𬼮	𬼯
U+2CF3x	𬼰	𬼱	𬼲	𬼳	𬼴	𬼵	𬼶	𬼷	𬼸	𬼹	𬼺	𬼻	𬼼	𬼽	𬼾	𬼿
U+2CF4x	𬽀	𬽁	𬽂	𬽃	𬽄	𬽅	𬽆	𬽇	𬽈	𬽉	𬽊	𬽋	𬽌	𬽍	𬽎	𬽏
U+2CF5x	𬽐	𬽑	𬽒	𬽓	𬽔	𬽕	𬽖	𬽗	𬽘	𬽙	𬽚	𬽛	𬽜	𬽝	𬽞	𬽟
U+2CF6x	𬽠	𬽡	𬽢	𬽣	𬽤	𬽥	𬽦	𬽧	𬽨	𬽩	𬽪	𬽫	𬽬	𬽭	𬽮	𬽯
U+2CF7x	𬽰	𬽱	𬽲	𬽳	𬽴	𬽵	𬽶	𬽷	𬽸	𬽹	𬽺	𬽻	𬽼	𬽽	𬽾	𬽿
U+2CF8x	𬾀	𬾁	𬾂	𬾃	𬾄	𬾅	𬾆	𬾇	𬾈	𬾉	𬾊	𬾋	𬾌	𬾍	𬾎	𬾏
U+2CF9x	𬾐	𬾑	𬾒	𬾓	𬾔	𬾕	𬾖	𬾗	𬾘	𬾙	𬾚	𬾛	𬾜	𬾝	𬾞	𬾟
U+2CFAx	𬾠	𬾡	𬾢	𬾣	𬾤	𬾥	𬾦	𬾧	𬾨	𬾩	𬾪	𬾫	𬾬	𬾭	𬾮	𬾯
U+2CFBx	𬾰	𬾱	𬾲	𬾳	𬾴	𬾵	𬾶	𬾷	𬾸	𬾹	𬾺	𬾻	𬾼	𬾽	𬾾	𬾿
U+2CFCx	𬿀	𬿁	𬿂	𬿃	𬿄	𬿅	𬿆	𬿇	𬿈	𬿉	𬿊	𬿋	𬿌	𬿍	𬿎	𬿏
U+2CFDx	𬿐	𬿑	𬿒	𬿓	𬿔	𬿕	𬿖	𬿗	𬿘	𬿙	𬿚	𬿛	𬿜	𬿝	𬿞	𬿟
U+2CFEx	𬿠	𬿡	𬿢	𬿣	𬿤	𬿥	𬿦	𬿧	𬿨	𬿩	𬿪	𬿫	𬿬	𬿭	𬿮	𬿯
U+2CFFx	𬿰	𬿱	𬿲	𬿳	𬿴	𬿵	𬿶	𬿷	𬿸	𬿹	𬿺	𬿻	𬿼	𬿽	𬿾	𬿿
U+2D00x	𭀀	𭀁	𭀂	𭀃	𭀄	𭀅	𭀆	𭀇	𭀈	𭀉	𭀊	𭀋	𭀌	𭀍	𭀎	𭀏
U+2D01x	𭀐	𭀑	𭀒	𭀓	𭀔	𭀕	𭀖	𭀗	𭀘	𭀙	𭀚	𭀛	𭀜	𭀝	𭀞	𭀟
U+2D02x	𭀠	𭀡	𭀢	𭀣	𭀤	𭀥	𭀦	𭀧	𭀨	𭀩	𭀪	𭀫	𭀬	𭀭	𭀮	𭀯
U+2D03x	𭀰	𭀱	𭀲	𭀳	𭀴	𭀵	𭀶	𭀷	𭀸	𭀹	𭀺	𭀻	𭀼	𭀽	𭀾	𭀿
U+2D04x	𭁀	𭁁	𭁂	𭁃	𭁄	𭁅	𭁆	𭁇	𭁈	𭁉	𭁊	𭁋	𭁌	𭁍	𭁎	𭁏
U+2D05x	𭁐	𭁑	𭁒	𭁓	𭁔	𭁕	𭁖	𭁗	𭁘	𭁙	𭁚	𭁛	𭁜	𭁝	𭁞	𭁟
U+2D06x	𭁠	𭁡	𭁢	𭁣	𭁤	𭁥	𭁦	𭁧	𭁨	𭁩	𭁪	𭁫	𭁬	𭁭	𭁮	𭁯
U+2D07x	𭁰	𭁱	𭁲	𭁳	𭁴	𭁵	𭁶	𭁷	𭁸	𭁹	𭁺	𭁻	𭁼	𭁽	𭁾	𭁿
U+2D08x	𭂀	𭂁	𭂂	𭂃	𭂄	𭂅	𭂆	𭂇	𭂈	𭂉	𭂊	𭂋	𭂌	𭂍	𭂎	𭂏
U+2D09x	𭂐	𭂑	𭂒	𭂓	𭂔	𭂕	𭂖	𭂗	𭂘	𭂙	𭂚	𭂛	𭂜	𭂝	𭂞	𭂟
U+2D0Ax	𭂠	𭂡	𭂢	𭂣	𭂤	𭂥	𭂦	𭂧	𭂨	𭂩	𭂪	𭂫	𭂬	𭂭	𭂮	𭂯
U+2D0Bx	𭂰	𭂱	𭂲	𭂳	𭂴	𭂵	𭂶	𭂷	𭂸	𭂹	𭂺	𭂻	𭂼	𭂽	𭂾	𭂿
U+2D0Cx	𭃀	𭃁	𭃂	𭃃	𭃄	𭃅	𭃆	𭃇	𭃈	𭃉	𭃊	𭃋	𭃌	𭃍	𭃎	𭃏
U+2D0Dx	𭃐	𭃑	𭃒	𭃓	𭃔	𭃕	𭃖	𭃗	𭃘	𭃙	𭃚	𭃛	𭃜	𭃝	𭃞	𭃟
U+2D0Ex	𭃠	𭃡	𭃢	𭃣	𭃤	𭃥	𭃦	𭃧	𭃨	𭃩	𭃪	𭃫	𭃬	𭃭	𭃮	𭃯
U+2D0Fx	𭃰	𭃱	𭃲	𭃳	𭃴	𭃵	𭃶	𭃷	𭃸	𭃹	𭃺	𭃻	𭃼	𭃽	𭃾	𭃿
U+2D10x	𭄀	𭄁	𭄂	𭄃	𭄄	𭄅	𭄆	𭄇	𭄈	𭄉	𭄊	𭄋	𭄌	𭄍	𭄎	𭄏
U+2D11x	𭄐	𭄑	𭄒	𭄓	𭄔	𭄕	𭄖	𭄗	𭄘	𭄙	𭄚	𭄛	𭄜	𭄝	𭄞	𭄟
U+2D12x	𭄠	𭄡	𭄢	𭄣	𭄤	𭄥	𭄦	𭄧	𭄨	𭄩	𭄪	𭄫	𭄬	𭄭	𭄮	𭄯
U+2D13x	𭄰	𭄱	𭄲	𭄳	𭄴	𭄵	𭄶	𭄷	𭄸	𭄹	𭄺	𭄻	𭄼	𭄽	𭄾	𭄿
U+2D14x	𭅀	𭅁	𭅂	𭅃	𭅄	𭅅	𭅆	𭅇	𭅈	𭅉	𭅊	𭅋	𭅌	𭅍	𭅎	𭅏
U+2D15x	𭅐	𭅑	𭅒	𭅓	𭅔	𭅕	𭅖	𭅗	𭅘	𭅙	𭅚	𭅛	𭅜	𭅝	𭅞	𭅟
U+2D16x	𭅠	𭅡	𭅢	𭅣	𭅤	𭅥	𭅦	𭅧	𭅨	𭅩	𭅪	𭅫	𭅬	𭅭	𭅮	𭅯
U+2D17x	𭅰	𭅱	𭅲	𭅳	𭅴	𭅵	𭅶	𭅷	𭅸	𭅹	𭅺	𭅻	𭅼	𭅽	𭅾	𭅿
U+2D18x	𭆀	𭆁	𭆂	𭆃	𭆄	𭆅	𭆆	𭆇	𭆈	𭆉	𭆊	𭆋	𭆌	𭆍	𭆎	𭆏
U+2D19x	𭆐	𭆑	𭆒	𭆓	𭆔	𭆕	𭆖	𭆗	𭆘	𭆙	𭆚	𭆛	𭆜	𭆝	𭆞	𭆟
U+2D1Ax	𭆠	𭆡	𭆢	𭆣	𭆤	𭆥	𭆦	𭆧	𭆨	𭆩	𭆪	𭆫	𭆬	𭆭	𭆮	𭆯
U+2D1Bx	𭆰	𭆱	𭆲	𭆳	𭆴	𭆵	𭆶	𭆷	𭆸	𭆹	𭆺	𭆻	𭆼	𭆽	𭆾	𭆿
U+2D1Cx	𭇀	𭇁	𭇂	𭇃	𭇄	𭇅	𭇆	𭇇	𭇈	𭇉	𭇊	𭇋	𭇌	𭇍	𭇎	𭇏
U+2D1Dx	𭇐	𭇑	𭇒	𭇓	𭇔	𭇕	𭇖	𭇗	𭇘	𭇙	𭇚	𭇛	𭇜	𭇝	𭇞	𭇟
U+2D1Ex	𭇠	𭇡	𭇢	𭇣	𭇤	𭇥	𭇦	𭇧	𭇨	𭇩	𭇪	𭇫	𭇬	𭇭	𭇮	𭇯
U+2D1Fx	𭇰	𭇱	𭇲	𭇳	𭇴	𭇵	𭇶	𭇷	𭇸	𭇹	𭇺	𭇻	𭇼	𭇽	𭇾	𭇿
U+2D20x	𭈀	𭈁	𭈂	𭈃	𭈄	𭈅	𭈆	𭈇	𭈈	𭈉	𭈊	𭈋	𭈌	𭈍	𭈎	𭈏
U+2D21x	𭈐	𭈑	𭈒	𭈓	𭈔	𭈕	𭈖	𭈗	𭈘	𭈙	𭈚	𭈛	𭈜	𭈝	𭈞	𭈟
U+2D22x	𭈠	𭈡	𭈢	𭈣	𭈤	𭈥	𭈦	𭈧	𭈨	𭈩	𭈪	𭈫	𭈬	𭈭	𭈮	𭈯
U+2D23x	𭈰	𭈱	𭈲	𭈳	𭈴	𭈵	𭈶	𭈷	𭈸	𭈹	𭈺	𭈻	𭈼	𭈽	𭈾	𭈿
U+2D24x	𭉀	𭉁	𭉂	𭉃	𭉄	𭉅	𭉆	𭉇	𭉈	𭉉	𭉊	𭉋	𭉌	𭉍	𭉎	𭉏
U+2D25x	𭉐	𭉑	𭉒	𭉓	𭉔	𭉕	𭉖	𭉗	𭉘	𭉙	𭉚	𭉛	𭉜	𭉝	𭉞	𭉟
U+2D26x	𭉠	𭉡	𭉢	𭉣	𭉤	𭉥	𭉦	𭉧	𭉨	𭉩	𭉪	𭉫	𭉬	𭉭	𭉮	𭉯
U+2D27x	𭉰	𭉱	𭉲	𭉳	𭉴	𭉵	𭉶	𭉷	𭉸	𭉹	𭉺	𭉻	𭉼	𭉽	𭉾	𭉿
U+2D28x	𭊀	𭊁	𭊂	𭊃	𭊄	𭊅	𭊆	𭊇	𭊈	𭊉	𭊊	𭊋	𭊌	𭊍	𭊎	𭊏
U+2D29x	𭊐	𭊑	𭊒	𭊓	𭊔	𭊕	𭊖	𭊗	𭊘	𭊙	𭊚	𭊛	𭊜	𭊝	𭊞	𭊟
U+2D2Ax	𭊠	𭊡	𭊢	𭊣	𭊤	𭊥	𭊦	𭊧	𭊨	𭊩	𭊪	𭊫	𭊬	𭊭	𭊮	𭊯
U+2D2Bx	𭊰	𭊱	𭊲	𭊳	𭊴	𭊵	𭊶	𭊷	𭊸	𭊹	𭊺	𭊻	𭊼	𭊽	𭊾	𭊿
U+2D2Cx	𭋀	𭋁	𭋂	𭋃	𭋄	𭋅	𭋆	𭋇	𭋈	𭋉	𭋊	𭋋	𭋌	𭋍	𭋎	𭋏
U+2D2Dx	𭋐	𭋑	𭋒	𭋓	𭋔	𭋕	𭋖	𭋗	𭋘	𭋙	𭋚	𭋛	𭋜	𭋝	𭋞	𭋟
U+2D2Ex	𭋠	𭋡	𭋢	𭋣	𭋤	𭋥	𭋦	𭋧	𭋨	𭋩	𭋪	𭋫	𭋬	𭋭	𭋮	𭋯
U+2D2Fx	𭋰	𭋱	𭋲	𭋳	𭋴	𭋵	𭋶	𭋷	𭋸	𭋹	𭋺	𭋻	𭋼	𭋽	𭋾	𭋿
U+2D30x	𭌀	𭌁	𭌂	𭌃	𭌄	𭌅	𭌆	𭌇	𭌈	𭌉	𭌊	𭌋	𭌌	𭌍	𭌎	𭌏
U+2D31x	𭌐	𭌑	𭌒	𭌓	𭌔	𭌕	𭌖	𭌗	𭌘	𭌙	𭌚	𭌛	𭌜	𭌝	𭌞	𭌟
U+2D32x	𭌠	𭌡	𭌢	𭌣	𭌤	𭌥	𭌦	𭌧	𭌨	𭌩	𭌪	𭌫	𭌬	𭌭	𭌮	𭌯
U+2D33x	𭌰	𭌱	𭌲	𭌳	𭌴	𭌵	𭌶	𭌷	𭌸	𭌹	𭌺	𭌻	𭌼	𭌽	𭌾	𭌿
U+2D34x	𭍀	𭍁	𭍂	𭍃	𭍄	𭍅	𭍆	𭍇	𭍈	𭍉	𭍊	𭍋	𭍌	𭍍	𭍎	𭍏
U+2D35x	𭍐	𭍑	𭍒	𭍓	𭍔	𭍕	𭍖	𭍗	𭍘	𭍙	𭍚	𭍛	𭍜	𭍝	𭍞	𭍟
U+2D36x	𭍠	𭍡	𭍢	𭍣	𭍤	𭍥	𭍦	𭍧	𭍨	𭍩	𭍪	𭍫	𭍬	𭍭	𭍮	𭍯
U+2D37x	𭍰	𭍱	𭍲	𭍳	𭍴	𭍵	𭍶	𭍷	𭍸	𭍹	𭍺	𭍻	𭍼	𭍽	𭍾	𭍿
U+2D38x	𭎀	𭎁	𭎂	𭎃	𭎄	𭎅	𭎆	𭎇	𭎈	𭎉	𭎊	𭎋	𭎌	𭎍	𭎎	𭎏
U+2D39x	𭎐	𭎑	𭎒	𭎓	𭎔	𭎕	𭎖	𭎗	𭎘	𭎙	𭎚	𭎛	𭎜	𭎝	𭎞	𭎟
U+2D3Ax	𭎠	𭎡	𭎢	𭎣	𭎤	𭎥	𭎦	𭎧	𭎨	𭎩	𭎪	𭎫	𭎬	𭎭	𭎮	𭎯
U+2D3Bx	𭎰	𭎱	𭎲	𭎳	𭎴	𭎵	𭎶	𭎷	𭎸	𭎹	𭎺	𭎻	𭎼	𭎽	𭎾	𭎿
U+2D3Cx	𭏀	𭏁	𭏂	𭏃	𭏄	𭏅	𭏆	𭏇	𭏈	𭏉	𭏊	𭏋	𭏌	𭏍	𭏎	𭏏
U+2D3Dx	𭏐	𭏑	𭏒	𭏓	𭏔	𭏕	𭏖	𭏗	𭏘	𭏙	𭏚	𭏛	𭏜	𭏝	𭏞	𭏟
U+2D3Ex	𭏠	𭏡	𭏢	𭏣	𭏤	𭏥	𭏦	𭏧	𭏨	𭏩	𭏪	𭏫	𭏬	𭏭	𭏮	𭏯
U+2D3Fx	𭏰	𭏱	𭏲	𭏳	𭏴	𭏵	𭏶	𭏷	𭏸	𭏹	𭏺	𭏻	𭏼	𭏽	𭏾	𭏿
U+2D40x	𭐀	𭐁	𭐂	𭐃	𭐄	𭐅	𭐆	𭐇	𭐈	𭐉	𭐊	𭐋	𭐌	𭐍	𭐎	𭐏
U+2D41x	𭐐	𭐑	𭐒	𭐓	𭐔	𭐕	𭐖	𭐗	𭐘	𭐙	𭐚	𭐛	𭐜	𭐝	𭐞	𭐟
U+2D42x	𭐠	𭐡	𭐢	𭐣	𭐤	𭐥	𭐦	𭐧	𭐨	𭐩	𭐪	𭐫	𭐬	𭐭	𭐮	𭐯
U+2D43x	𭐰	𭐱	𭐲	𭐳	𭐴	𭐵	𭐶	𭐷	𭐸	𭐹	𭐺	𭐻	𭐼	𭐽	𭐾	𭐿
U+2D44x	𭑀	𭑁	𭑂	𭑃	𭑄	𭑅	𭑆	𭑇	𭑈	𭑉	𭑊	𭑋	𭑌	𭑍	𭑎	𭑏
U+2D45x	𭑐	𭑑	𭑒	𭑓	𭑔	𭑕	𭑖	𭑗	𭑘	𭑙	𭑚	𭑛	𭑜	𭑝	𭑞	𭑟
U+2D46x	𭑠	𭑡	𭑢	𭑣	𭑤	𭑥	𭑦	𭑧	𭑨	𭑩	𭑪	𭑫	𭑬	𭑭	𭑮	𭑯
U+2D47x	𭑰	𭑱	𭑲	𭑳	𭑴	𭑵	𭑶	𭑷	𭑸	𭑹	𭑺	𭑻	𭑼	𭑽	𭑾	𭑿
U+2D48x	𭒀	𭒁	𭒂	𭒃	𭒄	𭒅	𭒆	𭒇	𭒈	𭒉	𭒊	𭒋	𭒌	𭒍	𭒎	𭒏
U+2D49x	𭒐	𭒑	𭒒	𭒓	𭒔	𭒕	𭒖	𭒗	𭒘	𭒙	𭒚	𭒛	𭒜	𭒝	𭒞	𭒟
U+2D4Ax	𭒠	𭒡	𭒢	𭒣	𭒤	𭒥	𭒦	𭒧	𭒨	𭒩	𭒪	𭒫	𭒬	𭒭	𭒮	𭒯
U+2D4Bx	𭒰	𭒱	𭒲	𭒳	𭒴	𭒵	𭒶	𭒷	𭒸	𭒹	𭒺	𭒻	𭒼	𭒽	𭒾	𭒿
U+2D4Cx	𭓀	𭓁	𭓂	𭓃	𭓄	𭓅	𭓆	𭓇	𭓈	𭓉	𭓊	𭓋	𭓌	𭓍	𭓎	𭓏
U+2D4Dx	𭓐	𭓑	𭓒	𭓓	𭓔	𭓕	𭓖	𭓗	𭓘	𭓙	𭓚	𭓛	𭓜	𭓝	𭓞	𭓟
U+2D4Ex	𭓠	𭓡	𭓢	𭓣	𭓤	𭓥	𭓦	𭓧	𭓨	𭓩	𭓪	𭓫	𭓬	𭓭	𭓮	𭓯
U+2D4Fx	𭓰	𭓱	𭓲	𭓳	𭓴	𭓵	𭓶	𭓷	𭓸	𭓹	𭓺	𭓻	𭓼	𭓽	𭓾	𭓿
U+2D50x	𭔀	𭔁	𭔂	𭔃	𭔄	𭔅	𭔆	𭔇	𭔈	𭔉	𭔊	𭔋	𭔌	𭔍	𭔎	𭔏
U+2D51x	𭔐	𭔑	𭔒	𭔓	𭔔	𭔕	𭔖	𭔗	𭔘	𭔙	𭔚	𭔛	𭔜	𭔝	𭔞	𭔟
U+2D52x	𭔠	𭔡	𭔢	𭔣	𭔤	𭔥	𭔦	𭔧	𭔨	𭔩	𭔪	𭔫	𭔬	𭔭	𭔮	𭔯
U+2D53x	𭔰	𭔱	𭔲	𭔳	𭔴	𭔵	𭔶	𭔷	𭔸	𭔹	𭔺	𭔻	𭔼	𭔽	𭔾	𭔿
U+2D54x	𭕀	𭕁	𭕂	𭕃	𭕄	𭕅	𭕆	𭕇	𭕈	𭕉	𭕊	𭕋	𭕌	𭕍	𭕎	𭕏
U+2D55x	𭕐	𭕑	𭕒	𭕓	𭕔	𭕕	𭕖	𭕗	𭕘	𭕙	𭕚	𭕛	𭕜	𭕝	𭕞	𭕟
U+2D56x	𭕠	𭕡	𭕢	𭕣	𭕤	𭕥	𭕦	𭕧	𭕨	𭕩	𭕪	𭕫	𭕬	𭕭	𭕮	𭕯
U+2D57x	𭕰	𭕱	𭕲	𭕳	𭕴	𭕵	𭕶	𭕷	𭕸	𭕹	𭕺	𭕻	𭕼	𭕽	𭕾	𭕿
U+2D58x	𭖀	𭖁	𭖂	𭖃	𭖄	𭖅	𭖆	𭖇	𭖈	𭖉	𭖊	𭖋	𭖌	𭖍	𭖎	𭖏
U+2D59x	𭖐	𭖑	𭖒	𭖓	𭖔	𭖕	𭖖	𭖗	𭖘	𭖙	𭖚	𭖛	𭖜	𭖝	𭖞	𭖟
U+2D5Ax	𭖠	𭖡	𭖢	𭖣	𭖤	𭖥	𭖦	𭖧	𭖨	𭖩	𭖪	𭖫	𭖬	𭖭	𭖮	𭖯
U+2D5Bx	𭖰	𭖱	𭖲	𭖳	𭖴	𭖵	𭖶	𭖷	𭖸	𭖹	𭖺	𭖻	𭖼	𭖽	𭖾	𭖿
U+2D5Cx	𭗀	𭗁	𭗂	𭗃	𭗄	𭗅	𭗆	𭗇	𭗈	𭗉	𭗊	𭗋	𭗌	𭗍	𭗎	𭗏
U+2D5Dx	𭗐	𭗑	𭗒	𭗓	𭗔	𭗕	𭗖	𭗗	𭗘	𭗙	𭗚	𭗛	𭗜	𭗝	𭗞	𭗟
U+2D5Ex	𭗠	𭗡	𭗢	𭗣	𭗤	𭗥	𭗦	𭗧	𭗨	𭗩	𭗪	𭗫	𭗬	𭗭	𭗮	𭗯
U+2D5Fx	𭗰	𭗱	𭗲	𭗳	𭗴	𭗵	𭗶	𭗷	𭗸	𭗹	𭗺	𭗻	𭗼	𭗽	𭗾	𭗿
U+2D60x	𭘀	𭘁	𭘂	𭘃	𭘄	𭘅	𭘆	𭘇	𭘈	𭘉	𭘊	𭘋	𭘌	𭘍	𭘎	𭘏
U+2D61x	𭘐	𭘑	𭘒	𭘓	𭘔	𭘕	𭘖	𭘗	𭘘	𭘙	𭘚	𭘛	𭘜	𭘝	𭘞	𭘟
U+2D62x	𭘠	𭘡	𭘢	𭘣	𭘤	𭘥	𭘦	𭘧	𭘨	𭘩	𭘪	𭘫	𭘬	𭘭	𭘮	𭘯
U+2D63x	𭘰	𭘱	𭘲	𭘳	𭘴	𭘵	𭘶	𭘷	𭘸	𭘹	𭘺	𭘻	𭘼	𭘽	𭘾	𭘿
U+2D64x	𭙀	𭙁	𭙂	𭙃	𭙄	𭙅	𭙆	𭙇	𭙈	𭙉	𭙊	𭙋	𭙌	𭙍	𭙎	𭙏
U+2D65x	𭙐	𭙑	𭙒	𭙓	𭙔	𭙕	𭙖	𭙗	𭙘	𭙙	𭙚	𭙛	𭙜	𭙝	𭙞	𭙟
U+2D66x	𭙠	𭙡	𭙢	𭙣	𭙤	𭙥	𭙦	𭙧	𭙨	𭙩	𭙪	𭙫	𭙬	𭙭	𭙮	𭙯
U+2D67x	𭙰	𭙱	𭙲	𭙳	𭙴	𭙵	𭙶	𭙷	𭙸	𭙹	𭙺	𭙻	𭙼	𭙽	𭙾	𭙿
U+2D68x	𭚀	𭚁	𭚂	𭚃	𭚄	𭚅	𭚆	𭚇	𭚈	𭚉	𭚊	𭚋	𭚌	𭚍	𭚎	𭚏
U+2D69x	𭚐	𭚑	𭚒	𭚓	𭚔	𭚕	𭚖	𭚗	𭚘	𭚙	𭚚	𭚛	𭚜	𭚝	𭚞	𭚟
U+2D6Ax	𭚠	𭚡	𭚢	𭚣	𭚤	𭚥	𭚦	𭚧	𭚨	𭚩	𭚪	𭚫	𭚬	𭚭	𭚮	𭚯
U+2D6Bx	𭚰	𭚱	𭚲	𭚳	𭚴	𭚵	𭚶	𭚷	𭚸	𭚹	𭚺	𭚻	𭚼	𭚽	𭚾	𭚿
U+2D6Cx	𭛀	𭛁	𭛂	𭛃	𭛄	𭛅	𭛆	𭛇	𭛈	𭛉	𭛊	𭛋	𭛌	𭛍	𭛎	𭛏
U+2D6Dx	𭛐	𭛑	𭛒	𭛓	𭛔	𭛕	𭛖	𭛗	𭛘	𭛙	𭛚	𭛛	𭛜	𭛝	𭛞	𭛟
U+2D6Ex	𭛠	𭛡	𭛢	𭛣	𭛤	𭛥	𭛦	𭛧	𭛨	𭛩	𭛪	𭛫	𭛬	𭛭	𭛮	𭛯
U+2D6Fx	𭛰	𭛱	𭛲	𭛳	𭛴	𭛵	𭛶	𭛷	𭛸	𭛹	𭛺	𭛻	𭛼	𭛽	𭛾	𭛿
U+2D70x	𭜀	𭜁	𭜂	𭜃	𭜄	𭜅	𭜆	𭜇	𭜈	𭜉	𭜊	𭜋	𭜌	𭜍	𭜎	𭜏
U+2D71x	𭜐	𭜑	𭜒	𭜓	𭜔	𭜕	𭜖	𭜗	𭜘	𭜙	𭜚	𭜛	𭜜	𭜝	𭜞	𭜟
U+2D72x	𭜠	𭜡	𭜢	𭜣	𭜤	𭜥	𭜦	𭜧	𭜨	𭜩	𭜪	𭜫	𭜬	𭜭	𭜮	𭜯
U+2D73x	𭜰	𭜱	𭜲	𭜳	𭜴	𭜵	𭜶	𭜷	𭜸	𭜹	𭜺	𭜻	𭜼	𭜽	𭜾	𭜿
U+2D74x	𭝀	𭝁	𭝂	𭝃	𭝄	𭝅	𭝆	𭝇	𭝈	𭝉	𭝊	𭝋	𭝌	𭝍	𭝎	𭝏
U+2D75x	𭝐	𭝑	𭝒	𭝓	𭝔	𭝕	𭝖	𭝗	𭝘	𭝙	𭝚	𭝛	𭝜	𭝝	𭝞	𭝟
U+2D76x	𭝠	𭝡	𭝢	𭝣	𭝤	𭝥	𭝦	𭝧	𭝨	𭝩	𭝪	𭝫	𭝬	𭝭	𭝮	𭝯
U+2D77x	𭝰	𭝱	𭝲	𭝳	𭝴	𭝵	𭝶	𭝷	𭝸	𭝹	𭝺	𭝻	𭝼	𭝽	𭝾	𭝿
U+2D78x	𭞀	𭞁	𭞂	𭞃	𭞄	𭞅	𭞆	𭞇	𭞈	𭞉	𭞊	𭞋	𭞌	𭞍	𭞎	𭞏
U+2D79x	𭞐	𭞑	𭞒	𭞓	𭞔	𭞕	𭞖	𭞗	𭞘	𭞙	𭞚	𭞛	𭞜	𭞝	𭞞	𭞟
U+2D7Ax	𭞠	𭞡	𭞢	𭞣	𭞤	𭞥	𭞦	𭞧	𭞨	𭞩	𭞪	𭞫	𭞬	𭞭	𭞮	𭞯
U+2D7Bx	𭞰	𭞱	𭞲	𭞳	𭞴	𭞵	𭞶	𭞷	𭞸	𭞹	𭞺	𭞻	𭞼	𭞽	𭞾	𭞿
U+2D7Cx	𭟀	𭟁	𭟂	𭟃	𭟄	𭟅	𭟆	𭟇	𭟈	𭟉	𭟊	𭟋	𭟌	𭟍	𭟎	𭟏
U+2D7Dx	𭟐	𭟑	𭟒	𭟓	𭟔	𭟕	𭟖	𭟗	𭟘	𭟙	𭟚	𭟛	𭟜	𭟝	𭟞	𭟟
U+2D7Ex	𭟠	𭟡	𭟢	𭟣	𭟤	𭟥	𭟦	𭟧	𭟨	𭟩	𭟪	𭟫	𭟬	𭟭	𭟮	𭟯
U+2D7Fx	𭟰	𭟱	𭟲	𭟳	𭟴	𭟵	𭟶	𭟷	𭟸	𭟹	𭟺	𭟻	𭟼	𭟽	𭟾	𭟿
U+2D80x	𭠀	𭠁	𭠂	𭠃	𭠄	𭠅	𭠆	𭠇	𭠈	𭠉	𭠊	𭠋	𭠌	𭠍	𭠎	𭠏
U+2D81x	𭠐	𭠑	𭠒	𭠓	𭠔	𭠕	𭠖	𭠗	𭠘	𭠙	𭠚	𭠛	𭠜	𭠝	𭠞	𭠟
U+2D82x	𭠠	𭠡	𭠢	𭠣	𭠤	𭠥	𭠦	𭠧	𭠨	𭠩	𭠪	𭠫	𭠬	𭠭	𭠮	𭠯
U+2D83x	𭠰	𭠱	𭠲	𭠳	𭠴	𭠵	𭠶	𭠷	𭠸	𭠹	𭠺	𭠻	𭠼	𭠽	𭠾	𭠿
U+2D84x	𭡀	𭡁	𭡂	𭡃	𭡄	𭡅	𭡆	𭡇	𭡈	𭡉	𭡊	𭡋	𭡌	𭡍	𭡎	𭡏
U+2D85x	𭡐	𭡑	𭡒	𭡓	𭡔	𭡕	𭡖	𭡗	𭡘	𭡙	𭡚	𭡛	𭡜	𭡝	𭡞	𭡟
U+2D86x	𭡠	𭡡	𭡢	𭡣	𭡤	𭡥	𭡦	𭡧	𭡨	𭡩	𭡪	𭡫	𭡬	𭡭	𭡮	𭡯
U+2D87x	𭡰	𭡱	𭡲	𭡳	𭡴	𭡵	𭡶	𭡷	𭡸	𭡹	𭡺	𭡻	𭡼	𭡽	𭡾	𭡿
U+2D88x	𭢀	𭢁	𭢂	𭢃	𭢄	𭢅	𭢆	𭢇	𭢈	𭢉	𭢊	𭢋	𭢌	𭢍	𭢎	𭢏
U+2D89x	𭢐	𭢑	𭢒	𭢓	𭢔	𭢕	𭢖	𭢗	𭢘	𭢙	𭢚	𭢛	𭢜	𭢝	𭢞	𭢟
U+2D8Ax	𭢠	𭢡	𭢢	𭢣	𭢤	𭢥	𭢦	𭢧	𭢨	𭢩	𭢪	𭢫	𭢬	𭢭	𭢮	𭢯
U+2D8Bx	𭢰	𭢱	𭢲	𭢳	𭢴	𭢵	𭢶	𭢷	𭢸	𭢹	𭢺	𭢻	𭢼	𭢽	𭢾	𭢿
U+2D8Cx	𭣀	𭣁	𭣂	𭣃	𭣄	𭣅	𭣆	𭣇	𭣈	𭣉	𭣊	𭣋	𭣌	𭣍	𭣎	𭣏
U+2D8Dx	𭣐	𭣑	𭣒	𭣓	𭣔	𭣕	𭣖	𭣗	𭣘	𭣙	𭣚	𭣛	𭣜	𭣝	𭣞	𭣟
U+2D8Ex	𭣠	𭣡	𭣢	𭣣	𭣤	𭣥	𭣦	𭣧	𭣨	𭣩	𭣪	𭣫	𭣬	𭣭	𭣮	𭣯
U+2D8Fx	𭣰	𭣱	𭣲	𭣳	𭣴	𭣵	𭣶	𭣷	𭣸	𭣹	𭣺	𭣻	𭣼	𭣽	𭣾	𭣿
U+2D90x	𭤀	𭤁	𭤂	𭤃	𭤄	𭤅	𭤆	𭤇	𭤈	𭤉	𭤊	𭤋	𭤌	𭤍	𭤎	𭤏
U+2D91x	𭤐	𭤑	𭤒	𭤓	𭤔	𭤕	𭤖	𭤗	𭤘	𭤙	𭤚	𭤛	𭤜	𭤝	𭤞	𭤟
U+2D92x	𭤠	𭤡	𭤢	𭤣	𭤤	𭤥	𭤦	𭤧	𭤨	𭤩	𭤪	𭤫	𭤬	𭤭	𭤮	𭤯
U+2D93x	𭤰	𭤱	𭤲	𭤳	𭤴	𭤵	𭤶	𭤷	𭤸	𭤹	𭤺	𭤻	𭤼	𭤽	𭤾	𭤿
U+2D94x	𭥀	𭥁	𭥂	𭥃	𭥄	𭥅	𭥆	𭥇	𭥈	𭥉	𭥊	𭥋	𭥌	𭥍	𭥎	𭥏
U+2D95x	𭥐	𭥑	𭥒	𭥓	𭥔	𭥕	𭥖	𭥗	𭥘	𭥙	𭥚	𭥛	𭥜	𭥝	𭥞	𭥟
U+2D96x	𭥠	𭥡	𭥢	𭥣	𭥤	𭥥	𭥦	𭥧	𭥨	𭥩	𭥪	𭥫	𭥬	𭥭	𭥮	𭥯
U+2D97x	𭥰	𭥱	𭥲	𭥳	𭥴	𭥵	𭥶	𭥷	𭥸	𭥹	𭥺	𭥻	𭥼	𭥽	𭥾	𭥿
U+2D98x	𭦀	𭦁	𭦂	𭦃	𭦄	𭦅	𭦆	𭦇	𭦈	𭦉	𭦊	𭦋	𭦌	𭦍	𭦎	𭦏
U+2D99x	𭦐	𭦑	𭦒	𭦓	𭦔	𭦕	𭦖	𭦗	𭦘	𭦙	𭦚	𭦛	𭦜	𭦝	𭦞	𭦟
U+2D9Ax	𭦠	𭦡	𭦢	𭦣	𭦤	𭦥	𭦦	𭦧	𭦨	𭦩	𭦪	𭦫	𭦬	𭦭	𭦮	𭦯
U+2D9Bx	𭦰	𭦱	𭦲	𭦳	𭦴	𭦵	𭦶	𭦷	𭦸	𭦹	𭦺	𭦻	𭦼	𭦽	𭦾	𭦿
U+2D9Cx	𭧀	𭧁	𭧂	𭧃	𭧄	𭧅	𭧆	𭧇	𭧈	𭧉	𭧊	𭧋	𭧌	𭧍	𭧎	𭧏
U+2D9Dx	𭧐	𭧑	𭧒	𭧓	𭧔	𭧕	𭧖	𭧗	𭧘	𭧙	𭧚	𭧛	𭧜	𭧝	𭧞	𭧟
U+2D9Ex	𭧠	𭧡	𭧢	𭧣	𭧤	𭧥	𭧦	𭧧	𭧨	𭧩	𭧪	𭧫	𭧬	𭧭	𭧮	𭧯
U+2D9Fx	𭧰	𭧱	𭧲	𭧳	𭧴	𭧵	𭧶	𭧷	𭧸	𭧹	𭧺	𭧻	𭧼	𭧽	𭧾	𭧿
U+2DA0x	𭨀	𭨁	𭨂	𭨃	𭨄	𭨅	𭨆	𭨇	𭨈	𭨉	𭨊	𭨋	𭨌	𭨍	𭨎	𭨏
U+2DA1x	𭨐	𭨑	𭨒	𭨓	𭨔	𭨕	𭨖	𭨗	𭨘	𭨙	𭨚	𭨛	𭨜	𭨝	𭨞	𭨟
U+2DA2x	𭨠	𭨡	𭨢	𭨣	𭨤	𭨥	𭨦	𭨧	𭨨	𭨩	𭨪	𭨫	𭨬	𭨭	𭨮	𭨯
U+2DA3x	𭨰	𭨱	𭨲	𭨳	𭨴	𭨵	𭨶	𭨷	𭨸	𭨹	𭨺	𭨻	𭨼	𭨽	𭨾	𭨿
U+2DA4x	𭩀	𭩁	𭩂	𭩃	𭩄	𭩅	𭩆	𭩇	𭩈	𭩉	𭩊	𭩋	𭩌	𭩍	𭩎	𭩏
U+2DA5x	𭩐	𭩑	𭩒	𭩓	𭩔	𭩕	𭩖	𭩗	𭩘	𭩙	𭩚	𭩛	𭩜	𭩝	𭩞	𭩟
U+2DA6x	𭩠	𭩡	𭩢	𭩣	𭩤	𭩥	𭩦	𭩧	𭩨	𭩩	𭩪	𭩫	𭩬	𭩭	𭩮	𭩯
U+2DA7x	𭩰	𭩱	𭩲	𭩳	𭩴	𭩵	𭩶	𭩷	𭩸	𭩹	𭩺	𭩻	𭩼	𭩽	𭩾	𭩿
U+2DA8x	𭪀	𭪁	𭪂	𭪃	𭪄	𭪅	𭪆	𭪇	𭪈	𭪉	𭪊	𭪋	𭪌	𭪍	𭪎	𭪏
U+2DA9x	𭪐	𭪑	𭪒	𭪓	𭪔	𭪕	𭪖	𭪗	𭪘	𭪙	𭪚	𭪛	𭪜	𭪝	𭪞	𭪟
U+2DAAx	𭪠	𭪡	𭪢	𭪣	𭪤	𭪥	𭪦	𭪧	𭪨	𭪩	𭪪	𭪫	𭪬	𭪭	𭪮	𭪯
U+2DABx	𭪰	𭪱	𭪲	𭪳	𭪴	𭪵	𭪶	𭪷	𭪸	𭪹	𭪺	𭪻	𭪼	𭪽	𭪾	𭪿
U+2DACx	𭫀	𭫁	𭫂	𭫃	𭫄	𭫅	𭫆	𭫇	𭫈	𭫉	𭫊	𭫋	𭫌	𭫍	𭫎	𭫏
U+2DADx	𭫐	𭫑	𭫒	𭫓	𭫔	𭫕	𭫖	𭫗	𭫘	𭫙	𭫚	𭫛	𭫜	𭫝	𭫞	𭫟
U+2DAEx	𭫠	𭫡	𭫢	𭫣	𭫤	𭫥	𭫦	𭫧	𭫨	𭫩	𭫪	𭫫	𭫬	𭫭	𭫮	𭫯
U+2DAFx	𭫰	𭫱	𭫲	𭫳	𭫴	𭫵	𭫶	𭫷	𭫸	𭫹	𭫺	𭫻	𭫼	𭫽	𭫾	𭫿
U+2DB0x	𭬀	𭬁	𭬂	𭬃	𭬄	𭬅	𭬆	𭬇	𭬈	𭬉	𭬊	𭬋	𭬌	𭬍	𭬎	𭬏
U+2DB1x	𭬐	𭬑	𭬒	𭬓	𭬔	𭬕	𭬖	𭬗	𭬘	𭬙	𭬚	𭬛	𭬜	𭬝	𭬞	𭬟
U+2DB2x	𭬠	𭬡	𭬢	𭬣	𭬤	𭬥	𭬦	𭬧	𭬨	𭬩	𭬪	𭬫	𭬬	𭬭	𭬮	𭬯
U+2DB3x	𭬰	𭬱	𭬲	𭬳	𭬴	𭬵	𭬶	𭬷	𭬸	𭬹	𭬺	𭬻	𭬼	𭬽	𭬾	𭬿
U+2DB4x	𭭀	𭭁	𭭂	𭭃	𭭄	𭭅	𭭆	𭭇	𭭈	𭭉	𭭊	𭭋	𭭌	𭭍	𭭎	𭭏
U+2DB5x	𭭐	𭭑	𭭒	𭭓	𭭔	𭭕	𭭖	𭭗	𭭘	𭭙	𭭚	𭭛	𭭜	𭭝	𭭞	𭭟
U+2DB6x	𭭠	𭭡	𭭢	𭭣	𭭤	𭭥	𭭦	𭭧	𭭨	𭭩	𭭪	𭭫	𭭬	𭭭	𭭮	𭭯
U+2DB7x	𭭰	𭭱	𭭲	𭭳	𭭴	𭭵	𭭶	𭭷	𭭸	𭭹	𭭺	𭭻	𭭼	𭭽	𭭾	𭭿
U+2DB8x	𭮀	𭮁	𭮂	𭮃	𭮄	𭮅	𭮆	𭮇	𭮈	𭮉	𭮊	𭮋	𭮌	𭮍	𭮎	𭮏
U+2DB9x	𭮐	𭮑	𭮒	𭮓	𭮔	𭮕	𭮖	𭮗	𭮘	𭮙	𭮚	𭮛	𭮜	𭮝	𭮞	𭮟
U+2DBAx	𭮠	𭮡	𭮢	𭮣	𭮤	𭮥	𭮦	𭮧	𭮨	𭮩	𭮪	𭮫	𭮬	𭮭	𭮮	𭮯
U+2DBBx	𭮰	𭮱	𭮲	𭮳	𭮴	𭮵	𭮶	𭮷	𭮸	𭮹	𭮺	𭮻	𭮼	𭮽	𭮾	𭮿
U+2DBCx	𭯀	𭯁	𭯂	𭯃	𭯄	𭯅	𭯆	𭯇	𭯈	𭯉	𭯊	𭯋	𭯌	𭯍	𭯎	𭯏
U+2DBDx	𭯐	𭯑	𭯒	𭯓	𭯔	𭯕	𭯖	𭯗	𭯘	𭯙	𭯚	𭯛	𭯜	𭯝	𭯞	𭯟
U+2DBEx	𭯠	𭯡	𭯢	𭯣	𭯤	𭯥	𭯦	𭯧	𭯨	𭯩	𭯪	𭯫	𭯬	𭯭	𭯮	𭯯
U+2DBFx	𭯰	𭯱	𭯲	𭯳	𭯴	𭯵	𭯶	𭯷	𭯸	𭯹	𭯺	𭯻	𭯼	𭯽	𭯾	𭯿
U+2DC0x	𭰀	𭰁	𭰂	𭰃	𭰄	𭰅	𭰆	𭰇	𭰈	𭰉	𭰊	𭰋	𭰌	𭰍	𭰎	𭰏
U+2DC1x	𭰐	𭰑	𭰒	𭰓	𭰔	𭰕	𭰖	𭰗	𭰘	𭰙	𭰚	𭰛	𭰜	𭰝	𭰞	𭰟
U+2DC2x	𭰠	𭰡	𭰢	𭰣	𭰤	𭰥	𭰦	𭰧	𭰨	𭰩	𭰪	𭰫	𭰬	𭰭	𭰮	𭰯
U+2DC3x	𭰰	𭰱	𭰲	𭰳	𭰴	𭰵	𭰶	𭰷	𭰸	𭰹	𭰺	𭰻	𭰼	𭰽	𭰾	𭰿
U+2DC4x	𭱀	𭱁	𭱂	𭱃	𭱄	𭱅	𭱆	𭱇	𭱈	𭱉	𭱊	𭱋	𭱌	𭱍	𭱎	𭱏
U+2DC5x	𭱐	𭱑	𭱒	𭱓	𭱔	𭱕	𭱖	𭱗	𭱘	𭱙	𭱚	𭱛	𭱜	𭱝	𭱞	𭱟
U+2DC6x	𭱠	𭱡	𭱢	𭱣	𭱤	𭱥	𭱦	𭱧	𭱨	𭱩	𭱪	𭱫	𭱬	𭱭	𭱮	𭱯
U+2DC7x	𭱰	𭱱	𭱲	𭱳	𭱴	𭱵	𭱶	𭱷	𭱸	𭱹	𭱺	𭱻	𭱼	𭱽	𭱾	𭱿
U+2DC8x	𭲀	𭲁	𭲂	𭲃	𭲄	𭲅	𭲆	𭲇	𭲈	𭲉	𭲊	𭲋	𭲌	𭲍	𭲎	𭲏
U+2DC9x	𭲐	𭲑	𭲒	𭲓	𭲔	𭲕	𭲖	𭲗	𭲘	𭲙	𭲚	𭲛	𭲜	𭲝	𭲞	𭲟
U+2DCAx	𭲠	𭲡	𭲢	𭲣	𭲤	𭲥	𭲦	𭲧	𭲨	𭲩	𭲪	𭲫	𭲬	𭲭	𭲮	𭲯
U+2DCBx	𭲰	𭲱	𭲲	𭲳	𭲴	𭲵	𭲶	𭲷	𭲸	𭲹	𭲺	𭲻	𭲼	𭲽	𭲾	𭲿
U+2DCCx	𭳀	𭳁	𭳂	𭳃	𭳄	𭳅	𭳆	𭳇	𭳈	𭳉	𭳊	𭳋	𭳌	𭳍	𭳎	𭳏
U+2DCDx	𭳐	𭳑	𭳒	𭳓	𭳔	𭳕	𭳖	𭳗	𭳘	𭳙	𭳚	𭳛	𭳜	𭳝	𭳞	𭳟
U+2DCEx	𭳠	𭳡	𭳢	𭳣	𭳤	𭳥	𭳦	𭳧	𭳨	𭳩	𭳪	𭳫	𭳬	𭳭	𭳮	𭳯
U+2DCFx	𭳰	𭳱	𭳲	𭳳	𭳴	𭳵	𭳶	𭳷	𭳸	𭳹	𭳺	𭳻	𭳼	𭳽	𭳾	𭳿
U+2DD0x	𭴀	𭴁	𭴂	𭴃	𭴄	𭴅	𭴆	𭴇	𭴈	𭴉	𭴊	𭴋	𭴌	𭴍	𭴎	𭴏
U+2DD1x	𭴐	𭴑	𭴒	𭴓	𭴔	𭴕	𭴖	𭴗	𭴘	𭴙	𭴚	𭴛	𭴜	𭴝	𭴞	𭴟
U+2DD2x	𭴠	𭴡	𭴢	𭴣	𭴤	𭴥	𭴦	𭴧	𭴨	𭴩	𭴪	𭴫	𭴬	𭴭	𭴮	𭴯
U+2DD3x	𭴰	𭴱	𭴲	𭴳	𭴴	𭴵	𭴶	𭴷	𭴸	𭴹	𭴺	𭴻	𭴼	𭴽	𭴾	𭴿
U+2DD4x	𭵀	𭵁	𭵂	𭵃	𭵄	𭵅	𭵆	𭵇	𭵈	𭵉	𭵊	𭵋	𭵌	𭵍	𭵎	𭵏
U+2DD5x	𭵐	𭵑	𭵒	𭵓	𭵔	𭵕	𭵖	𭵗	𭵘	𭵙	𭵚	𭵛	𭵜	𭵝	𭵞	𭵟
U+2DD6x	𭵠	𭵡	𭵢	𭵣	𭵤	𭵥	𭵦	𭵧	𭵨	𭵩	𭵪	𭵫	𭵬	𭵭	𭵮	𭵯
U+2DD7x	𭵰	𭵱	𭵲	𭵳	𭵴	𭵵	𭵶	𭵷	𭵸	𭵹	𭵺	𭵻	𭵼	𭵽	𭵾	𭵿
U+2DD8x	𭶀	𭶁	𭶂	𭶃	𭶄	𭶅	𭶆	𭶇	𭶈	𭶉	𭶊	𭶋	𭶌	𭶍	𭶎	𭶏
U+2DD9x	𭶐	𭶑	𭶒	𭶓	𭶔	𭶕	𭶖	𭶗	𭶘	𭶙	𭶚	𭶛	𭶜	𭶝	𭶞	𭶟
U+2DDAx	𭶠	𭶡	𭶢	𭶣	𭶤	𭶥	𭶦	𭶧	𭶨	𭶩	𭶪	𭶫	𭶬	𭶭	𭶮	𭶯
U+2DDBx	𭶰	𭶱	𭶲	𭶳	𭶴	𭶵	𭶶	𭶷	𭶸	𭶹	𭶺	𭶻	𭶼	𭶽	𭶾	𭶿
U+2DDCx	𭷀	𭷁	𭷂	𭷃	𭷄	𭷅	𭷆	𭷇	𭷈	𭷉	𭷊	𭷋	𭷌	𭷍	𭷎	𭷏
U+2DDDx	𭷐	𭷑	𭷒	𭷓	𭷔	𭷕	𭷖	𭷗	𭷘	𭷙	𭷚	𭷛	𭷜	𭷝	𭷞	𭷟
U+2DDEx	𭷠	𭷡	𭷢	𭷣	𭷤	𭷥	𭷦	𭷧	𭷨	𭷩	𭷪	𭷫	𭷬	𭷭	𭷮	𭷯
U+2DDFx	𭷰	𭷱	𭷲	𭷳	𭷴	𭷵	𭷶	𭷷	𭷸	𭷹	𭷺	𭷻	𭷼	𭷽	𭷾	𭷿
U+2DE0x	𭸀	𭸁	𭸂	𭸃	𭸄	𭸅	𭸆	𭸇	𭸈	𭸉	𭸊	𭸋	𭸌	𭸍	𭸎	𭸏
U+2DE1x	𭸐	𭸑	𭸒	𭸓	𭸔	𭸕	𭸖	𭸗	𭸘	𭸙	𭸚	𭸛	𭸜	𭸝	𭸞	𭸟
U+2DE2x	𭸠	𭸡	𭸢	𭸣	𭸤	𭸥	𭸦	𭸧	𭸨	𭸩	𭸪	𭸫	𭸬	𭸭	𭸮	𭸯
U+2DE3x	𭸰	𭸱	𭸲	𭸳	𭸴	𭸵	𭸶	𭸷	𭸸	𭸹	𭸺	𭸻	𭸼	𭸽	𭸾	𭸿
U+2DE4x	𭹀	𭹁	𭹂	𭹃	𭹄	𭹅	𭹆	𭹇	𭹈	𭹉	𭹊	𭹋	𭹌	𭹍	𭹎	𭹏
U+2DE5x	𭹐	𭹑	𭹒	𭹓	𭹔	𭹕	𭹖	𭹗	𭹘	𭹙	𭹚	𭹛	𭹜	𭹝	𭹞	𭹟
U+2DE6x	𭹠	𭹡	𭹢	𭹣	𭹤	𭹥	𭹦	𭹧	𭹨	𭹩	𭹪	𭹫	𭹬	𭹭	𭹮	𭹯
U+2DE7x	𭹰	𭹱	𭹲	𭹳	𭹴	𭹵	𭹶	𭹷	𭹸	𭹹	𭹺	𭹻	𭹼	𭹽	𭹾	𭹿
U+2DE8x	𭺀	𭺁	𭺂	𭺃	𭺄	𭺅	𭺆	𭺇	𭺈	𭺉	𭺊	𭺋	𭺌	𭺍	𭺎	𭺏
U+2DE9x	𭺐	𭺑	𭺒	𭺓	𭺔	𭺕	𭺖	𭺗	𭺘	𭺙	𭺚	𭺛	𭺜	𭺝	𭺞	𭺟
U+2DEAx	𭺠	𭺡	𭺢	𭺣	𭺤	𭺥	𭺦	𭺧	𭺨	𭺩	𭺪	𭺫	𭺬	𭺭	𭺮	𭺯
U+2DEBx	𭺰	𭺱	𭺲	𭺳	𭺴	𭺵	𭺶	𭺷	𭺸	𭺹	𭺺	𭺻	𭺼	𭺽	𭺾	𭺿
U+2DECx	𭻀	𭻁	𭻂	𭻃	𭻄	𭻅	𭻆	𭻇	𭻈	𭻉	𭻊	𭻋	𭻌	𭻍	𭻎	𭻏
U+2DEDx	𭻐	𭻑	𭻒	𭻓	𭻔	𭻕	𭻖	𭻗	𭻘	𭻙	𭻚	𭻛	𭻜	𭻝	𭻞	𭻟
U+2DEEx	𭻠	𭻡	𭻢	𭻣	𭻤	𭻥	𭻦	𭻧	𭻨	𭻩	𭻪	𭻫	𭻬	𭻭	𭻮	𭻯
U+2DEFx	𭻰	𭻱	𭻲	𭻳	𭻴	𭻵	𭻶	𭻷	𭻸	𭻹	𭻺	𭻻	𭻼	𭻽	𭻾	𭻿
U+2DF0x	𭼀	𭼁	𭼂	𭼃	𭼄	𭼅	𭼆	𭼇	𭼈	𭼉	𭼊	𭼋	𭼌	𭼍	𭼎	𭼏
U+2DF1x	𭼐	𭼑	𭼒	𭼓	𭼔	𭼕	𭼖	𭼗	𭼘	𭼙	𭼚	𭼛	𭼜	𭼝	𭼞	𭼟
U+2DF2x	𭼠	𭼡	𭼢	𭼣	𭼤	𭼥	𭼦	𭼧	𭼨	𭼩	𭼪	𭼫	𭼬	𭼭	𭼮	𭼯
U+2DF3x	𭼰	𭼱	𭼲	𭼳	𭼴	𭼵	𭼶	𭼷	𭼸	𭼹	𭼺	𭼻	𭼼	𭼽	𭼾	𭼿
U+2DF4x	𭽀	𭽁	𭽂	𭽃	𭽄	𭽅	𭽆	𭽇	𭽈	𭽉	𭽊	𭽋	𭽌	𭽍	𭽎	𭽏
U+2DF5x	𭽐	𭽑	𭽒	𭽓	𭽔	𭽕	𭽖	𭽗	𭽘	𭽙	𭽚	𭽛	𭽜	𭽝	𭽞	𭽟
U+2DF6x	𭽠	𭽡	𭽢	𭽣	𭽤	𭽥	𭽦	𭽧	𭽨	𭽩	𭽪	𭽫	𭽬	𭽭	𭽮	𭽯
U+2DF7x	𭽰	𭽱	𭽲	𭽳	𭽴	𭽵	𭽶	𭽷	𭽸	𭽹	𭽺	𭽻	𭽼	𭽽	𭽾	𭽿
U+2DF8x	𭾀	𭾁	𭾂	𭾃	𭾄	𭾅	𭾆	𭾇	𭾈	𭾉	𭾊	𭾋	𭾌	𭾍	𭾎	𭾏
U+2DF9x	𭾐	𭾑	𭾒	𭾓	𭾔	𭾕	𭾖	𭾗	𭾘	𭾙	𭾚	𭾛	𭾜	𭾝	𭾞	𭾟
U+2DFAx	𭾠	𭾡	𭾢	𭾣	𭾤	𭾥	𭾦	𭾧	𭾨	𭾩	𭾪	𭾫	𭾬	𭾭	𭾮	𭾯
U+2DFBx	𭾰	𭾱	𭾲	𭾳	𭾴	𭾵	𭾶	𭾷	𭾸	𭾹	𭾺	𭾻	𭾼	𭾽	𭾾	𭾿
U+2DFCx	𭿀	𭿁	𭿂	𭿃	𭿄	𭿅	𭿆	𭿇	𭿈	𭿉	𭿊	𭿋	𭿌	𭿍	𭿎	𭿏
U+2DFDx	𭿐	𭿑	𭿒	𭿓	𭿔	𭿕	𭿖	𭿗	𭿘	𭿙	𭿚	𭿛	𭿜	𭿝	𭿞	𭿟
U+2DFEx	𭿠	𭿡	𭿢	𭿣	𭿤	𭿥	𭿦	𭿧	𭿨	𭿩	𭿪	𭿫	𭿬	𭿭	𭿮	𭿯
U+2DFFx	𭿰	𭿱	𭿲	𭿳	𭿴	𭿵	𭿶	𭿷	𭿸	𭿹	𭿺	𭿻	𭿼	𭿽	𭿾	𭿿
U+2E00x	𮀀	𮀁	𮀂	𮀃	𮀄	𮀅	𮀆	𮀇	𮀈	𮀉	𮀊	𮀋	𮀌	𮀍	𮀎	𮀏
U+2E01x	𮀐	𮀑	𮀒	𮀓	𮀔	𮀕	𮀖	𮀗	𮀘	𮀙	𮀚	𮀛	𮀜	𮀝	𮀞	𮀟
U+2E02x	𮀠	𮀡	𮀢	𮀣	𮀤	𮀥	𮀦	𮀧	𮀨	𮀩	𮀪	𮀫	𮀬	𮀭	𮀮	𮀯
U+2E03x	𮀰	𮀱	𮀲	𮀳	𮀴	𮀵	𮀶	𮀷	𮀸	𮀹	𮀺	𮀻	𮀼	𮀽	𮀾	𮀿
U+2E04x	𮁀	𮁁	𮁂	𮁃	𮁄	𮁅	𮁆	𮁇	𮁈	𮁉	𮁊	𮁋	𮁌	𮁍	𮁎	𮁏
U+2E05x	𮁐	𮁑	𮁒	𮁓	𮁔	𮁕	𮁖	𮁗	𮁘	𮁙	𮁚	𮁛	𮁜	𮁝	𮁞	𮁟
U+2E06x	𮁠	𮁡	𮁢	𮁣	𮁤	𮁥	𮁦	𮁧	𮁨	𮁩	𮁪	𮁫	𮁬	𮁭	𮁮	𮁯
U+2E07x	𮁰	𮁱	𮁲	𮁳	𮁴	𮁵	𮁶	𮁷	𮁸	𮁹	𮁺	𮁻	𮁼	𮁽	𮁾	𮁿
U+2E08x	𮂀	𮂁	𮂂	𮂃	𮂄	𮂅	𮂆	𮂇	𮂈	𮂉	𮂊	𮂋	𮂌	𮂍	𮂎	𮂏
U+2E09x	𮂐	𮂑	𮂒	𮂓	𮂔	𮂕	𮂖	𮂗	𮂘	𮂙	𮂚	𮂛	𮂜	𮂝	𮂞	𮂟
U+2E0Ax	𮂠	𮂡	𮂢	𮂣	𮂤	𮂥	𮂦	𮂧	𮂨	𮂩	𮂪	𮂫	𮂬	𮂭	𮂮	𮂯
U+2E0Bx	𮂰	𮂱	𮂲	𮂳	𮂴	𮂵	𮂶	𮂷	𮂸	𮂹	𮂺	𮂻	𮂼	𮂽	𮂾	𮂿
U+2E0Cx	𮃀	𮃁	𮃂	𮃃	𮃄	𮃅	𮃆	𮃇	𮃈	𮃉	𮃊	𮃋	𮃌	𮃍	𮃎	𮃏
U+2E0Dx	𮃐	𮃑	𮃒	𮃓	𮃔	𮃕	𮃖	𮃗	𮃘	𮃙	𮃚	𮃛	𮃜	𮃝	𮃞	𮃟
U+2E0Ex	𮃠	𮃡	𮃢	𮃣	𮃤	𮃥	𮃦	𮃧	𮃨	𮃩	𮃪	𮃫	𮃬	𮃭	𮃮	𮃯
U+2E0Fx	𮃰	𮃱	𮃲	𮃳	𮃴	𮃵	𮃶	𮃷	𮃸	𮃹	𮃺	𮃻	𮃼	𮃽	𮃾	𮃿
U+2E10x	𮄀	𮄁	𮄂	𮄃	𮄄	𮄅	𮄆	𮄇	𮄈	𮄉	𮄊	𮄋	𮄌	𮄍	𮄎	𮄏
U+2E11x	𮄐	𮄑	𮄒	𮄓	𮄔	𮄕	𮄖	𮄗	𮄘	𮄙	𮄚	𮄛	𮄜	𮄝	𮄞	𮄟
U+2E12x	𮄠	𮄡	𮄢	𮄣	𮄤	𮄥	𮄦	𮄧	𮄨	𮄩	𮄪	𮄫	𮄬	𮄭	𮄮	𮄯
U+2E13x	𮄰	𮄱	𮄲	𮄳	𮄴	𮄵	𮄶	𮄷	𮄸	𮄹	𮄺	𮄻	𮄼	𮄽	𮄾	𮄿
U+2E14x	𮅀	𮅁	𮅂	𮅃	𮅄	𮅅	𮅆	𮅇	𮅈	𮅉	𮅊	𮅋	𮅌	𮅍	𮅎	𮅏
U+2E15x	𮅐	𮅑	𮅒	𮅓	𮅔	𮅕	𮅖	𮅗	𮅘	𮅙	𮅚	𮅛	𮅜	𮅝	𮅞	𮅟
U+2E16x	𮅠	𮅡	𮅢	𮅣	𮅤	𮅥	𮅦	𮅧	𮅨	𮅩	𮅪	𮅫	𮅬	𮅭	𮅮	𮅯
U+2E17x	𮅰	𮅱	𮅲	𮅳	𮅴	𮅵	𮅶	𮅷	𮅸	𮅹	𮅺	𮅻	𮅼	𮅽	𮅾	𮅿
U+2E18x	𮆀	𮆁	𮆂	𮆃	𮆄	𮆅	𮆆	𮆇	𮆈	𮆉	𮆊	𮆋	𮆌	𮆍	𮆎	𮆏
U+2E19x	𮆐	𮆑	𮆒	𮆓	𮆔	𮆕	𮆖	𮆗	𮆘	𮆙	𮆚	𮆛	𮆜	𮆝	𮆞	𮆟
U+2E1Ax	𮆠	𮆡	𮆢	𮆣	𮆤	𮆥	𮆦	𮆧	𮆨	𮆩	𮆪	𮆫	𮆬	𮆭	𮆮	𮆯
U+2E1Bx	𮆰	𮆱	𮆲	𮆳	𮆴	𮆵	𮆶	𮆷	𮆸	𮆹	𮆺	𮆻	𮆼	𮆽	𮆾	𮆿
U+2E1Cx	𮇀	𮇁	𮇂	𮇃	𮇄	𮇅	𮇆	𮇇	𮇈	𮇉	𮇊	𮇋	𮇌	𮇍	𮇎	𮇏
U+2E1Dx	𮇐	𮇑	𮇒	𮇓	𮇔	𮇕	𮇖	𮇗	𮇘	𮇙	𮇚	𮇛	𮇜	𮇝	𮇞	𮇟
U+2E1Ex	𮇠	𮇡	𮇢	𮇣	𮇤	𮇥	𮇦	𮇧	𮇨	𮇩	𮇪	𮇫	𮇬	𮇭	𮇮	𮇯
U+2E1Fx	𮇰	𮇱	𮇲	𮇳	𮇴	𮇵	𮇶	𮇷	𮇸	𮇹	𮇺	𮇻	𮇼	𮇽	𮇾	𮇿
U+2E20x	𮈀	𮈁	𮈂	𮈃	𮈄	𮈅	𮈆	𮈇	𮈈	𮈉	𮈊	𮈋	𮈌	𮈍	𮈎	𮈏
U+2E21x	𮈐	𮈑	𮈒	𮈓	𮈔	𮈕	𮈖	𮈗	𮈘	𮈙	𮈚	𮈛	𮈜	𮈝	𮈞	𮈟
U+2E22x	𮈠	𮈡	𮈢	𮈣	𮈤	𮈥	𮈦	𮈧	𮈨	𮈩	𮈪	𮈫	𮈬	𮈭	𮈮	𮈯
U+2E23x	𮈰	𮈱	𮈲	𮈳	𮈴	𮈵	𮈶	𮈷	𮈸	𮈹	𮈺	𮈻	𮈼	𮈽	𮈾	𮈿
U+2E24x	𮉀	𮉁	𮉂	𮉃	𮉄	𮉅	𮉆	𮉇	𮉈	𮉉	𮉊	𮉋	𮉌	𮉍	𮉎	𮉏
U+2E25x	𮉐	𮉑	𮉒	𮉓	𮉔	𮉕	𮉖	𮉗	𮉘	𮉙	𮉚	𮉛	𮉜	𮉝	𮉞	𮉟
U+2E26x	𮉠	𮉡	𮉢	𮉣	𮉤	𮉥	𮉦	𮉧	𮉨	𮉩	𮉪	𮉫	𮉬	𮉭	𮉮	𮉯
U+2E27x	𮉰	𮉱	𮉲	𮉳	𮉴	𮉵	𮉶	𮉷	𮉸	𮉹	𮉺	𮉻	𮉼	𮉽	𮉾	𮉿
U+2E28x	𮊀	𮊁	𮊂	𮊃	𮊄	𮊅	𮊆	𮊇	𮊈	𮊉	𮊊	𮊋	𮊌	𮊍	𮊎	𮊏
U+2E29x	𮊐	𮊑	𮊒	𮊓	𮊔	𮊕	𮊖	𮊗	𮊘	𮊙	𮊚	𮊛	𮊜	𮊝	𮊞	𮊟
U+2E2Ax	𮊠	𮊡	𮊢	𮊣	𮊤	𮊥	𮊦	𮊧	𮊨	𮊩	𮊪	𮊫	𮊬	𮊭	𮊮	𮊯
U+2E2Bx	𮊰	𮊱	𮊲	𮊳	𮊴	𮊵	𮊶	𮊷	𮊸	𮊹	𮊺	𮊻	𮊼	𮊽	𮊾	𮊿
U+2E2Cx	𮋀	𮋁	𮋂	𮋃	𮋄	𮋅	𮋆	𮋇	𮋈	𮋉	𮋊	𮋋	𮋌	𮋍	𮋎	𮋏
U+2E2Dx	𮋐	𮋑	𮋒	𮋓	𮋔	𮋕	𮋖	𮋗	𮋘	𮋙	𮋚	𮋛	𮋜	𮋝	𮋞	𮋟
U+2E2Ex	𮋠	𮋡	𮋢	𮋣	𮋤	𮋥	𮋦	𮋧	𮋨	𮋩	𮋪	𮋫	𮋬	𮋭	𮋮	𮋯
U+2E2Fx	𮋰	𮋱	𮋲	𮋳	𮋴	𮋵	𮋶	𮋷	𮋸	𮋹	𮋺	𮋻	𮋼	𮋽	𮋾	𮋿
U+2E30x	𮌀	𮌁	𮌂	𮌃	𮌄	𮌅	𮌆	𮌇	𮌈	𮌉	𮌊	𮌋	𮌌	𮌍	𮌎	𮌏
U+2E31x	𮌐	𮌑	𮌒	𮌓	𮌔	𮌕	𮌖	𮌗	𮌘	𮌙	𮌚	𮌛	𮌜	𮌝	𮌞	𮌟
U+2E32x	𮌠	𮌡	𮌢	𮌣	𮌤	𮌥	𮌦	𮌧	𮌨	𮌩	𮌪	𮌫	𮌬	𮌭	𮌮	𮌯
U+2E33x	𮌰	𮌱	𮌲	𮌳	𮌴	𮌵	𮌶	𮌷	𮌸	𮌹	𮌺	𮌻	𮌼	𮌽	𮌾	𮌿
U+2E34x	𮍀	𮍁	𮍂	𮍃	𮍄	𮍅	𮍆	𮍇	𮍈	𮍉	𮍊	𮍋	𮍌	𮍍	𮍎	𮍏
U+2E35x	𮍐	𮍑	𮍒	𮍓	𮍔	𮍕	𮍖	𮍗	𮍘	𮍙	𮍚	𮍛	𮍜	𮍝	𮍞	𮍟
U+2E36x	𮍠	𮍡	𮍢	𮍣	𮍤	𮍥	𮍦	𮍧	𮍨	𮍩	𮍪	𮍫	𮍬	𮍭	𮍮	𮍯
U+2E37x	𮍰	𮍱	𮍲	𮍳	𮍴	𮍵	𮍶	𮍷	𮍸	𮍹	𮍺	𮍻	𮍼	𮍽	𮍾	𮍿
U+2E38x	𮎀	𮎁	𮎂	𮎃	𮎄	𮎅	𮎆	𮎇	𮎈	𮎉	𮎊	𮎋	𮎌	𮎍	𮎎	𮎏
U+2E39x	𮎐	𮎑	𮎒	𮎓	𮎔	𮎕	𮎖	𮎗	𮎘	𮎙	𮎚	𮎛	𮎜	𮎝	𮎞	𮎟
U+2E3Ax	𮎠	𮎡	𮎢	𮎣	𮎤	𮎥	𮎦	𮎧	𮎨	𮎩	𮎪	𮎫	𮎬	𮎭	𮎮	𮎯
U+2E3Bx	𮎰	𮎱	𮎲	𮎳	𮎴	𮎵	𮎶	𮎷	𮎸	𮎹	𮎺	𮎻	𮎼	𮎽	𮎾	𮎿
U+2E3Cx	𮏀	𮏁	𮏂	𮏃	𮏄	𮏅	𮏆	𮏇	𮏈	𮏉	𮏊	𮏋	𮏌	𮏍	𮏎	𮏏
U+2E3Dx	𮏐	𮏑	𮏒	𮏓	𮏔	𮏕	𮏖	𮏗	𮏘	𮏙	𮏚	𮏛	𮏜	𮏝	𮏞	𮏟
U+2E3Ex	𮏠	𮏡	𮏢	𮏣	𮏤	𮏥	𮏦	𮏧	𮏨	𮏩	𮏪	𮏫	𮏬	𮏭	𮏮	𮏯
U+2E3Fx	𮏰	𮏱	𮏲	𮏳	𮏴	𮏵	𮏶	𮏷	𮏸	𮏹	𮏺	𮏻	𮏼	𮏽	𮏾	𮏿
U+2E40x	𮐀	𮐁	𮐂	𮐃	𮐄	𮐅	𮐆	𮐇	𮐈	𮐉	𮐊	𮐋	𮐌	𮐍	𮐎	𮐏
U+2E41x	𮐐	𮐑	𮐒	𮐓	𮐔	𮐕	𮐖	𮐗	𮐘	𮐙	𮐚	𮐛	𮐜	𮐝	𮐞	𮐟
U+2E42x	𮐠	𮐡	𮐢	𮐣	𮐤	𮐥	𮐦	𮐧	𮐨	𮐩	𮐪	𮐫	𮐬	𮐭	𮐮	𮐯
U+2E43x	𮐰	𮐱	𮐲	𮐳	𮐴	𮐵	𮐶	𮐷	𮐸	𮐹	𮐺	𮐻	𮐼	𮐽	𮐾	𮐿
U+2E44x	𮑀	𮑁	𮑂	𮑃	𮑄	𮑅	𮑆	𮑇	𮑈	𮑉	𮑊	𮑋	𮑌	𮑍	𮑎	𮑏
U+2E45x	𮑐	𮑑	𮑒	𮑓	𮑔	𮑕	𮑖	𮑗	𮑘	𮑙	𮑚	𮑛	𮑜	𮑝	𮑞	𮑟
U+2E46x	𮑠	𮑡	𮑢	𮑣	𮑤	𮑥	𮑦	𮑧	𮑨	𮑩	𮑪	𮑫	𮑬	𮑭	𮑮	𮑯
U+2E47x	𮑰	𮑱	𮑲	𮑳	𮑴	𮑵	𮑶	𮑷	𮑸	𮑹	𮑺	𮑻	𮑼	𮑽	𮑾	𮑿
U+2E48x	𮒀	𮒁	𮒂	𮒃	𮒄	𮒅	𮒆	𮒇	𮒈	𮒉	𮒊	𮒋	𮒌	𮒍	𮒎	𮒏
U+2E49x	𮒐	𮒑	𮒒	𮒓	𮒔	𮒕	𮒖	𮒗	𮒘	𮒙	𮒚	𮒛	𮒜	𮒝	𮒞	𮒟
U+2E4Ax	𮒠	𮒡	𮒢	𮒣	𮒤	𮒥	𮒦	𮒧	𮒨	𮒩	𮒪	𮒫	𮒬	𮒭	𮒮	𮒯
U+2E4Bx	𮒰	𮒱	𮒲	𮒳	𮒴	𮒵	𮒶	𮒷	𮒸	𮒹	𮒺	𮒻	𮒼	𮒽	𮒾	𮒿
U+2E4Cx	𮓀	𮓁	𮓂	𮓃	𮓄	𮓅	𮓆	𮓇	𮓈	𮓉	𮓊	𮓋	𮓌	𮓍	𮓎	𮓏
U+2E4Dx	𮓐	𮓑	𮓒	𮓓	𮓔	𮓕	𮓖	𮓗	𮓘	𮓙	𮓚	𮓛	𮓜	𮓝	𮓞	𮓟
U+2E4Ex	𮓠	𮓡	𮓢	𮓣	𮓤	𮓥	𮓦	𮓧	𮓨	𮓩	𮓪	𮓫	𮓬	𮓭	𮓮	𮓯
U+2E4Fx	𮓰	𮓱	𮓲	𮓳	𮓴	𮓵	𮓶	𮓷	𮓸	𮓹	𮓺	𮓻	𮓼	𮓽	𮓾	𮓿
U+2E50x	𮔀	𮔁	𮔂	𮔃	𮔄	𮔅	𮔆	𮔇	𮔈	𮔉	𮔊	𮔋	𮔌	𮔍	𮔎	𮔏
U+2E51x	𮔐	𮔑	𮔒	𮔓	𮔔	𮔕	𮔖	𮔗	𮔘	𮔙	𮔚	𮔛	𮔜	𮔝	𮔞	𮔟
U+2E52x	𮔠	𮔡	𮔢	𮔣	𮔤	𮔥	𮔦	𮔧	𮔨	𮔩	𮔪	𮔫	𮔬	𮔭	𮔮	𮔯
U+2E53x	𮔰	𮔱	𮔲	𮔳	𮔴	𮔵	𮔶	𮔷	𮔸	𮔹	𮔺	𮔻	𮔼	𮔽	𮔾	𮔿
U+2E54x	𮕀	𮕁	𮕂	𮕃	𮕄	𮕅	𮕆	𮕇	𮕈	𮕉	𮕊	𮕋	𮕌	𮕍	𮕎	𮕏
U+2E55x	𮕐	𮕑	𮕒	𮕓	𮕔	𮕕	𮕖	𮕗	𮕘	𮕙	𮕚	𮕛	𮕜	𮕝	𮕞	𮕟
U+2E56x	𮕠	𮕡	𮕢	𮕣	𮕤	𮕥	𮕦	𮕧	𮕨	𮕩	𮕪	𮕫	𮕬	𮕭	𮕮	𮕯
U+2E57x	𮕰	𮕱	𮕲	𮕳	𮕴	𮕵	𮕶	𮕷	𮕸	𮕹	𮕺	𮕻	𮕼	𮕽	𮕾	𮕿
U+2E58x	𮖀	𮖁	𮖂	𮖃	𮖄	𮖅	𮖆	𮖇	𮖈	𮖉	𮖊	𮖋	𮖌	𮖍	𮖎	𮖏
U+2E59x	𮖐	𮖑	𮖒	𮖓	𮖔	𮖕	𮖖	𮖗	𮖘	𮖙	𮖚	𮖛	𮖜	𮖝	𮖞	𮖟
U+2E5Ax	𮖠	𮖡	𮖢	𮖣	𮖤	𮖥	𮖦	𮖧	𮖨	𮖩	𮖪	𮖫	𮖬	𮖭	𮖮	𮖯
U+2E5Bx	𮖰	𮖱	𮖲	𮖳	𮖴	𮖵	𮖶	𮖷	𮖸	𮖹	𮖺	𮖻	𮖼	𮖽	𮖾	𮖿
U+2E5Cx	𮗀	𮗁	𮗂	𮗃	𮗄	𮗅	𮗆	𮗇	𮗈	𮗉	𮗊	𮗋	𮗌	𮗍	𮗎	𮗏
U+2E5Dx	𮗐	𮗑	𮗒	𮗓	𮗔	𮗕	𮗖	𮗗	𮗘	𮗙	𮗚	𮗛	𮗜	𮗝	𮗞	𮗟
U+2E5Ex	𮗠	𮗡	𮗢	𮗣	𮗤	𮗥	𮗦	𮗧	𮗨	𮗩	𮗪	𮗫	𮗬	𮗭	𮗮	𮗯
U+2E5Fx	𮗰	𮗱	𮗲	𮗳	𮗴	𮗵	𮗶	𮗷	𮗸	𮗹	𮗺	𮗻	𮗼	𮗽	𮗾	𮗿
U+2E60x	𮘀	𮘁	𮘂	𮘃	𮘄	𮘅	𮘆	𮘇	𮘈	𮘉	𮘊	𮘋	𮘌	𮘍	𮘎	𮘏
U+2E61x	𮘐	𮘑	𮘒	𮘓	𮘔	𮘕	𮘖	𮘗	𮘘	𮘙	𮘚	𮘛	𮘜	𮘝	𮘞	𮘟
U+2E62x	𮘠	𮘡	𮘢	𮘣	𮘤	𮘥	𮘦	𮘧	𮘨	𮘩	𮘪	𮘫	𮘬	𮘭	𮘮	𮘯
U+2E63x	𮘰	𮘱	𮘲	𮘳	𮘴	𮘵	𮘶	𮘷	𮘸	𮘹	𮘺	𮘻	𮘼	𮘽	𮘾	𮘿
U+2E64x	𮙀	𮙁	𮙂	𮙃	𮙄	𮙅	𮙆	𮙇	𮙈	𮙉	𮙊	𮙋	𮙌	𮙍	𮙎	𮙏
U+2E65x	𮙐	𮙑	𮙒	𮙓	𮙔	𮙕	𮙖	𮙗	𮙘	𮙙	𮙚	𮙛	𮙜	𮙝	𮙞	𮙟
U+2E66x	𮙠	𮙡	𮙢	𮙣	𮙤	𮙥	𮙦	𮙧	𮙨	𮙩	𮙪	𮙫	𮙬	𮙭	𮙮	𮙯
U+2E67x	𮙰	𮙱	𮙲	𮙳	𮙴	𮙵	𮙶	𮙷	𮙸	𮙹	𮙺	𮙻	𮙼	𮙽	𮙾	𮙿
U+2E68x	𮚀	𮚁	𮚂	𮚃	𮚄	𮚅	𮚆	𮚇	𮚈	𮚉	𮚊	𮚋	𮚌	𮚍	𮚎	𮚏
U+2E69x	𮚐	𮚑	𮚒	𮚓	𮚔	𮚕	𮚖	𮚗	𮚘	𮚙	𮚚	𮚛	𮚜	𮚝	𮚞	𮚟
U+2E6Ax	𮚠	𮚡	𮚢	𮚣	𮚤	𮚥	𮚦	𮚧	𮚨	𮚩	𮚪	𮚫	𮚬	𮚭	𮚮	𮚯
U+2E6Bx	𮚰	𮚱	𮚲	𮚳	𮚴	𮚵	𮚶	𮚷	𮚸	𮚹	𮚺	𮚻	𮚼	𮚽	𮚾	𮚿
U+2E6Cx	𮛀	𮛁	𮛂	𮛃	𮛄	𮛅	𮛆	𮛇	𮛈	𮛉	𮛊	𮛋	𮛌	𮛍	𮛎	𮛏
U+2E6Dx	𮛐	𮛑	𮛒	𮛓	𮛔	𮛕	𮛖	𮛗	𮛘	𮛙	𮛚	𮛛	𮛜	𮛝	𮛞	𮛟
U+2E6Ex	𮛠	𮛡	𮛢	𮛣	𮛤	𮛥	𮛦	𮛧	𮛨	𮛩	𮛪	𮛫	𮛬	𮛭	𮛮	𮛯
U+2E6Fx	𮛰	𮛱	𮛲	𮛳	𮛴	𮛵	𮛶	𮛷	𮛸	𮛹	𮛺	𮛻	𮛼	𮛽	𮛾	𮛿
U+2E70x	𮜀	𮜁	𮜂	𮜃	𮜄	𮜅	𮜆	𮜇	𮜈	𮜉	𮜊	𮜋	𮜌	𮜍	𮜎	𮜏
U+2E71x	𮜐	𮜑	𮜒	𮜓	𮜔	𮜕	𮜖	𮜗	𮜘	𮜙	𮜚	𮜛	𮜜	𮜝	𮜞	𮜟
U+2E72x	𮜠	𮜡	𮜢	𮜣	𮜤	𮜥	𮜦	𮜧	𮜨	𮜩	𮜪	𮜫	𮜬	𮜭	𮜮	𮜯
U+2E73x	𮜰	𮜱	𮜲	𮜳	𮜴	𮜵	𮜶	𮜷	𮜸	𮜹	𮜺	𮜻	𮜼	𮜽	𮜾	𮜿
U+2E74x	𮝀	𮝁	𮝂	𮝃	𮝄	𮝅	𮝆	𮝇	𮝈	𮝉	𮝊	𮝋	𮝌	𮝍	𮝎	𮝏
U+2E75x	𮝐	𮝑	𮝒	𮝓	𮝔	𮝕	𮝖	𮝗	𮝘	𮝙	𮝚	𮝛	𮝜	𮝝	𮝞	𮝟
U+2E76x	𮝠	𮝡	𮝢	𮝣	𮝤	𮝥	𮝦	𮝧	𮝨	𮝩	𮝪	𮝫	𮝬	𮝭	𮝮	𮝯
U+2E77x	𮝰	𮝱	𮝲	𮝳	𮝴	𮝵	𮝶	𮝷	𮝸	𮝹	𮝺	𮝻	𮝼	𮝽	𮝾	𮝿
U+2E78x	𮞀	𮞁	𮞂	𮞃	𮞄	𮞅	𮞆	𮞇	𮞈	𮞉	𮞊	𮞋	𮞌	𮞍	𮞎	𮞏
U+2E79x	𮞐	𮞑	𮞒	𮞓	𮞔	𮞕	𮞖	𮞗	𮞘	𮞙	𮞚	𮞛	𮞜	𮞝	𮞞	𮞟
U+2E7Ax	𮞠	𮞡	𮞢	𮞣	𮞤	𮞥	𮞦	𮞧	𮞨	𮞩	𮞪	𮞫	𮞬	𮞭	𮞮	𮞯
U+2E7Bx	𮞰	𮞱	𮞲	𮞳	𮞴	𮞵	𮞶	𮞷	𮞸	𮞹	𮞺	𮞻	𮞼	𮞽	𮞾	𮞿
U+2E7Cx	𮟀	𮟁	𮟂	𮟃	𮟄	𮟅	𮟆	𮟇	𮟈	𮟉	𮟊	𮟋	𮟌	𮟍	𮟎	𮟏
U+2E7Dx	𮟐	𮟑	𮟒	𮟓	𮟔	𮟕	𮟖	𮟗	𮟘	𮟙	𮟚	𮟛	𮟜	𮟝	𮟞	𮟟
U+2E7Ex	𮟠	𮟡	𮟢	𮟣	𮟤	𮟥	𮟦	𮟧	𮟨	𮟩	𮟪	𮟫	𮟬	𮟭	𮟮	𮟯
U+2E7Fx	𮟰	𮟱	𮟲	𮟳	𮟴	𮟵	𮟶	𮟷	𮟸	𮟹	𮟺	𮟻	𮟼	𮟽	𮟾	𮟿
U+2E80x	𮠀	𮠁	𮠂	𮠃	𮠄	𮠅	𮠆	𮠇	𮠈	𮠉	𮠊	𮠋	𮠌	𮠍	𮠎	𮠏
U+2E81x	𮠐	𮠑	𮠒	𮠓	𮠔	𮠕	𮠖	𮠗	𮠘	𮠙	𮠚	𮠛	𮠜	𮠝	𮠞	𮠟
U+2E82x	𮠠	𮠡	𮠢	𮠣	𮠤	𮠥	𮠦	𮠧	𮠨	𮠩	𮠪	𮠫	𮠬	𮠭	𮠮	𮠯
U+2E83x	𮠰	𮠱	𮠲	𮠳	𮠴	𮠵	𮠶	𮠷	𮠸	𮠹	𮠺	𮠻	𮠼	𮠽	𮠾	𮠿
U+2E84x	𮡀	𮡁	𮡂	𮡃	𮡄	𮡅	𮡆	𮡇	𮡈	𮡉	𮡊	𮡋	𮡌	𮡍	𮡎	𮡏
U+2E85x	𮡐	𮡑	𮡒	𮡓	𮡔	𮡕	𮡖	𮡗	𮡘	𮡙	𮡚	𮡛	𮡜	𮡝	𮡞	𮡟
U+2E86x	𮡠	𮡡	𮡢	𮡣	𮡤	𮡥	𮡦	𮡧	𮡨	𮡩	𮡪	𮡫	𮡬	𮡭	𮡮	𮡯
U+2E87x	𮡰	𮡱	𮡲	𮡳	𮡴	𮡵	𮡶	𮡷	𮡸	𮡹	𮡺	𮡻	𮡼	𮡽	𮡾	𮡿
U+2E88x	𮢀	𮢁	𮢂	𮢃	𮢄	𮢅	𮢆	𮢇	𮢈	𮢉	𮢊	𮢋	𮢌	𮢍	𮢎	𮢏
U+2E89x	𮢐	𮢑	𮢒	𮢓	𮢔	𮢕	𮢖	𮢗	𮢘	𮢙	𮢚	𮢛	𮢜	𮢝	𮢞	𮢟
U+2E8Ax	𮢠	𮢡	𮢢	𮢣	𮢤	𮢥	𮢦	𮢧	𮢨	𮢩	𮢪	𮢫	𮢬	𮢭	𮢮	𮢯
U+2E8Bx	𮢰	𮢱	𮢲	𮢳	𮢴	𮢵	𮢶	𮢷	𮢸	𮢹	𮢺	𮢻	𮢼	𮢽	𮢾	𮢿
U+2E8Cx	𮣀	𮣁	𮣂	𮣃	𮣄	𮣅	𮣆	𮣇	𮣈	𮣉	𮣊	𮣋	𮣌	𮣍	𮣎	𮣏
U+2E8Dx	𮣐	𮣑	𮣒	𮣓	𮣔	𮣕	𮣖	𮣗	𮣘	𮣙	𮣚	𮣛	𮣜	𮣝	𮣞	𮣟
U+2E8Ex	𮣠	𮣡	𮣢	𮣣	𮣤	𮣥	𮣦	𮣧	𮣨	𮣩	𮣪	𮣫	𮣬	𮣭	𮣮	𮣯
U+2E8Fx	𮣰	𮣱	𮣲	𮣳	𮣴	𮣵	𮣶	𮣷	𮣸	𮣹	𮣺	𮣻	𮣼	𮣽	𮣾	𮣿
U+2E90x	𮤀	𮤁	𮤂	𮤃	𮤄	𮤅	𮤆	𮤇	𮤈	𮤉	𮤊	𮤋	𮤌	𮤍	𮤎	𮤏
U+2E91x	𮤐	𮤑	𮤒	𮤓	𮤔	𮤕	𮤖	𮤗	𮤘	𮤙	𮤚	𮤛	𮤜	𮤝	𮤞	𮤟
U+2E92x	𮤠	𮤡	𮤢	𮤣	𮤤	𮤥	𮤦	𮤧	𮤨	𮤩	𮤪	𮤫	𮤬	𮤭	𮤮	𮤯
U+2E93x	𮤰	𮤱	𮤲	𮤳	𮤴	𮤵	𮤶	𮤷	𮤸	𮤹	𮤺	𮤻	𮤼	𮤽	𮤾	𮤿
U+2E94x	𮥀	𮥁	𮥂	𮥃	𮥄	𮥅	𮥆	𮥇	𮥈	𮥉	𮥊	𮥋	𮥌	𮥍	𮥎	𮥏
U+2E95x	𮥐	𮥑	𮥒	𮥓	𮥔	𮥕	𮥖	𮥗	𮥘	𮥙	𮥚	𮥛	𮥜	𮥝	𮥞	𮥟
U+2E96x	𮥠	𮥡	𮥢	𮥣	𮥤	𮥥	𮥦	𮥧	𮥨	𮥩	𮥪	𮥫	𮥬	𮥭	𮥮	𮥯
U+2E97x	𮥰	𮥱	𮥲	𮥳	𮥴	𮥵	𮥶	𮥷	𮥸	𮥹	𮥺	𮥻	𮥼	𮥽	𮥾	𮥿
U+2E98x	𮦀	𮦁	𮦂	𮦃	𮦄	𮦅	𮦆	𮦇	𮦈	𮦉	𮦊	𮦋	𮦌	𮦍	𮦎	𮦏
U+2E99x	𮦐	𮦑	𮦒	𮦓	𮦔	𮦕	𮦖	𮦗	𮦘	𮦙	𮦚	𮦛	𮦜	𮦝	𮦞	𮦟
U+2E9Ax	𮦠	𮦡	𮦢	𮦣	𮦤	𮦥	𮦦	𮦧	𮦨	𮦩	𮦪	𮦫	𮦬	𮦭	𮦮	𮦯
U+2E9Bx	𮦰	𮦱	𮦲	𮦳	𮦴	𮦵	𮦶	𮦷	𮦸	𮦹	𮦺	𮦻	𮦼	𮦽	𮦾	𮦿
U+2E9Cx	𮧀	𮧁	𮧂	𮧃	𮧄	𮧅	𮧆	𮧇	𮧈	𮧉	𮧊	𮧋	𮧌	𮧍	𮧎	𮧏
U+2E9Dx	𮧐	𮧑	𮧒	𮧓	𮧔	𮧕	𮧖	𮧗	𮧘	𮧙	𮧚	𮧛	𮧜	𮧝	𮧞	𮧟
U+2E9Ex	𮧠	𮧡	𮧢	𮧣	𮧤	𮧥	𮧦	𮧧	𮧨	𮧩	𮧪	𮧫	𮧬	𮧭	𮧮	𮧯
U+2E9Fx	𮧰	𮧱	𮧲	𮧳	𮧴	𮧵	𮧶	𮧷	𮧸	𮧹	𮧺	𮧻	𮧼	𮧽	𮧾	𮧿
U+2EA0x	𮨀	𮨁	𮨂	𮨃	𮨄	𮨅	𮨆	𮨇	𮨈	𮨉	𮨊	𮨋	𮨌	𮨍	𮨎	𮨏
U+2EA1x	𮨐	𮨑	𮨒	𮨓	𮨔	𮨕	𮨖	𮨗	𮨘	𮨙	𮨚	𮨛	𮨜	𮨝	𮨞	𮨟
U+2EA2x	𮨠	𮨡	𮨢	𮨣	𮨤	𮨥	𮨦	𮨧	𮨨	𮨩	𮨪	𮨫	𮨬	𮨭	𮨮	𮨯
U+2EA3x	𮨰	𮨱	𮨲	𮨳	𮨴	𮨵	𮨶	𮨷	𮨸	𮨹	𮨺	𮨻	𮨼	𮨽	𮨾	𮨿
U+2EA4x	𮩀	𮩁	𮩂	𮩃	𮩄	𮩅	𮩆	𮩇	𮩈	𮩉	𮩊	𮩋	𮩌	𮩍	𮩎	𮩏
U+2EA5x	𮩐	𮩑	𮩒	𮩓	𮩔	𮩕	𮩖	𮩗	𮩘	𮩙	𮩚	𮩛	𮩜	𮩝	𮩞	𮩟
U+2EA6x	𮩠	𮩡	𮩢	𮩣	𮩤	𮩥	𮩦	𮩧	𮩨	𮩩	𮩪	𮩫	𮩬	𮩭	𮩮	𮩯
U+2EA7x	𮩰	𮩱	𮩲	𮩳	𮩴	𮩵	𮩶	𮩷	𮩸	𮩹	𮩺	𮩻	𮩼	𮩽	𮩾	𮩿
U+2EA8x	𮪀	𮪁	𮪂	𮪃	𮪄	𮪅	𮪆	𮪇	𮪈	𮪉	𮪊	𮪋	𮪌	𮪍	𮪎	𮪏
U+2EA9x	𮪐	𮪑	𮪒	𮪓	𮪔	𮪕	𮪖	𮪗	𮪘	𮪙	𮪚	𮪛	𮪜	𮪝	𮪞	𮪟
U+2EAAx	𮪠	𮪡	𮪢	𮪣	𮪤	𮪥	𮪦	𮪧	𮪨	𮪩	𮪪	𮪫	𮪬	𮪭	𮪮	𮪯
U+2EABx	𮪰	𮪱	𮪲	𮪳	𮪴	𮪵	𮪶	𮪷	𮪸	𮪹	𮪺	𮪻	𮪼	𮪽	𮪾	𮪿
U+2EACx	𮫀	𮫁	𮫂	𮫃	𮫄	𮫅	𮫆	𮫇	𮫈	𮫉	𮫊	𮫋	𮫌	𮫍	𮫎	𮫏
U+2EADx	𮫐	𮫑	𮫒	𮫓	𮫔	𮫕	𮫖	𮫗	𮫘	𮫙	𮫚	𮫛	𮫜	𮫝	𮫞	𮫟
U+2EAEx	𮫠	𮫡	𮫢	𮫣	𮫤	𮫥	𮫦	𮫧	𮫨	𮫩	𮫪	𮫫	𮫬	𮫭	𮫮	𮫯
U+2EAFx	𮫰	𮫱	𮫲	𮫳	𮫴	𮫵	𮫶	𮫷	𮫸	𮫹	𮫺	𮫻	𮫼	𮫽	𮫾	𮫿
U+2EB0x	𮬀	𮬁	𮬂	𮬃	𮬄	𮬅	𮬆	𮬇	𮬈	𮬉	𮬊	𮬋	𮬌	𮬍	𮬎	𮬏
U+2EB1x	𮬐	𮬑	𮬒	𮬓	𮬔	𮬕	𮬖	𮬗	𮬘	𮬙	𮬚	𮬛	𮬜	𮬝	𮬞	𮬟
U+2EB2x	𮬠	𮬡	𮬢	𮬣	𮬤	𮬥	𮬦	𮬧	𮬨	𮬩	𮬪	𮬫	𮬬	𮬭	𮬮	𮬯
U+2EB3x	𮬰	𮬱	𮬲	𮬳	𮬴	𮬵	𮬶	𮬷	𮬸	𮬹	𮬺	𮬻	𮬼	𮬽	𮬾	𮬿
U+2EB4x	𮭀	𮭁	𮭂	𮭃	𮭄	𮭅	𮭆	𮭇	𮭈	𮭉	𮭊	𮭋	𮭌	𮭍	𮭎	𮭏
U+2EB5x	𮭐	𮭑	𮭒	𮭓	𮭔	𮭕	𮭖	𮭗	𮭘	𮭙	𮭚	𮭛	𮭜	𮭝	𮭞	𮭟
U+2EB6x	𮭠	𮭡	𮭢	𮭣	𮭤	𮭥	𮭦	𮭧	𮭨	𮭩	𮭪	𮭫	𮭬	𮭭	𮭮	𮭯
U+2EB7x	𮭰	𮭱	𮭲	𮭳	𮭴	𮭵	𮭶	𮭷	𮭸	𮭹	𮭺	𮭻	𮭼	𮭽	𮭾	𮭿
U+2EB8x	𮮀	𮮁	𮮂	𮮃	𮮄	𮮅	𮮆	𮮇	𮮈	𮮉	𮮊	𮮋	𮮌	𮮍	𮮎	𮮏
U+2EB9x	𮮐	𮮑	𮮒	𮮓	𮮔	𮮕	𮮖	𮮗	𮮘	𮮙	𮮚	𮮛	𮮜	𮮝	𮮞	𮮟
U+2EBAx	𮮠	𮮡	𮮢	𮮣	𮮤	𮮥	𮮦	𮮧	𮮨	𮮩	𮮪	𮮫	𮮬	𮮭	𮮮	𮮯
U+2EBBx	𮮰	𮮱	𮮲	𮮳	𮮴	𮮵	𮮶	𮮷	𮮸	𮮹	𮮺	𮮻	𮮼	𮮽	𮮾	𮮿
U+2EBCx	𮯀	𮯁	𮯂	𮯃	𮯄	𮯅	𮯆	𮯇	𮯈	𮯉	𮯊	𮯋	𮯌	𮯍	𮯎	𮯏
U+2EBDx	𮯐	𮯑	𮯒	𮯓	𮯔	𮯕	𮯖	𮯗	𮯘	𮯙	𮯚	𮯛	𮯜	𮯝	𮯞	𮯟
U+2EBEx	𮯠															
Notes 1.As of Unicode version 17.0 2.Grey areas indicate non-assigned code points

== History ==
The following Unicode-related documents record the purpose and process of defining specific characters in the CJK Unified Ideographs Extension F block:

Version	Final code points (Note: Proposed code points and characters names may differ from final code points and names)	Count	L2 ID	WG2 ID	IRG ID	Document
10.0	U+2CEB0..2EBE0	7,473	L2/12-212			Lunde, Ken (2012-06-19), US/Unicode Extension F Submission Plan
10.0	U+2CEB0..2EBE0	7,473	L2/12-333			West, Andrew (2012-10-19), Request to UTC to Propose 226 Characters for Inclusion in CJK Extension F
10.0	U+2CEB0..2EBE0	7,473	L2/13-020			Chung, Jaemin (2013-01-25), US/Unicode Extension F Version 1.0 (IRG N1921) checking results
10.0	U+2CEB0..2EBE0	7,473	L2/14-248 (Summary, P1, P2, P3, P4, P5, Map, Withdrawn)	N4580 (Summary, P1, P2, P3, P4, P5, Map, Withdrawn)		Proposal for CJK Unified Ideograph Extension F, 2014-10-17
10.0	U+2CEB0..2EBE0	7,473	L2/14-268R			Anderson, Deborah; Whistler, Ken; McGowan, Rick; Pournader, Roozbeh; Iancu, Laurențiu; Glass, Andrew; Constable, Peter; Suignard, Michel (2014-10-27), "18. CJK Extension F", Recommendations to UTC #141 October 2014 on Script Proposals
10.0	U+2CEB0..2EBE0	7,473	L2/15-114			Fan, Ming (2015-04-20), Proposal to encode a Chinese Character as UNC [Affects U+2E014]
10.0	U+2CEB0..2EBE0	7,473	L2/15-155			Lunde, Ken (2015-05-20), UTC/US Urgently Needed Characters
10.0	U+2CEB0..2EBE0	7,473	L2/16-052	N4603 (pdf, doc)		Umamaheswaran, V. S. (2015-09-01), "M63.06", Unconfirmed minutes of WG 2 meeting 63
10.0	U+2CEB0..2EBE0	7,473	L2/15-222	N4678	N2090	Lunde, Ken (2015-09-17), UTC/US Urgently Needed Character
10.0	U+2CEB0..2EBE0	7,473	L2/15-262			Disposition of Comments on ISO/IEC CD 10646 (Ed.5), 2015-10-26
10.0	U+2CEB0..2EBE0	7,473	L2/16-203			Moore, Lisa (2016-08-18), "B.11.3.2", UTC #148 Minutes
10.0	U+2CEB0..2EBE0	7,473		N4739		"M64.05c, d, and f", Unconfirmed minutes of WG 2 meeting 64, 2016-08-31
10.0	U+2CEB0..2EBE0	7,473		N4972		Request to remove K1-6B6B from U+8C6C [Affects U+27CEF], 2018-06-05
10.0	U+2CEB0..2EBE0	7,473		N4974	N2301	Request of TCA's Horizontal Extension for Chemical Terminology [Affects U+2D23B and U+2E83A], 2018-06-12
10.0	U+2CEB0..2EBE0	7,473		N5075	N2272R2	Request for TCA's Horizontal Extension and Updating 11 T Glyphs [Affects U+2DC09], 2018-10-05
10.0	U+2CEB0..2EBE0	7,473		N5015		Shin, Sanghyun; Cho, Sungduk; Kim, Kyongsok (2018-12-13), Request to exchange source references for two K chars in Ext F: U+2EB7E and U+2EB89
10.0	U+2CEB0..2EBE0	7,473		N5020 (pdf, doc)		Umamaheswaran, V. S. (2019-01-11), "10.4.6", Unconfirmed minutes of WG 2 meeting 67
10.0	U+2CEB0..2EBE0	7,473	L2/21-159		N2507	Request for Horizontal Extension in the H-column of the ISO/IEC 10646 Standard [Affects U+2D25D], 2021-08-25
10.0	U+2CEB0..2EBE0	7,473	L2/21-173			Lunde, Ken (2021-09-29), CJK & Unihan Group Recommendations for UTC #169 Meeting [Affects U+2D25D]
10.0	U+2CEB0..2EBE0	7,473	L2/21-167			Cummings, Craig (2022-01-27), "Consensus 169-C13 [Affects U+2D25D]", Approved Minutes of UTC Meeting 169
10.0	U+2CEB0..2EBE0	7,473	L2/22-077		N2512R	Shin, SangHyun; Cho, Sungduk; Kim, Kyongsok (2021-11-02), A revised proposal requesting a Horizontal Extension of 51 Hanja chars (previously submitted for ExtF/G/H) [Affects U+2CF4E, 2D3EC, 2D6A7, 2D7BA, 2D979, 2DA74, 2DA97, 2DC13, 2DDC0, 2DF10, 2DF78, 2E05A, 2E0AE, 2E516, 2E640, 2E680, and 2EA63]
10.0	U+2CEB0..2EBE0	7,473	L2/22-067			Lunde, Ken (2022-04-16), "03 [Affects U+2D3EC], 19 [Affects U+2CF4E, 2D3EC, 2D6A7, 2D7BA, 2D979, 2DA74, 2DA97, 2DC13, 2DDC0, 2DF10, 2DF78, 2E05A, 2E0AE, 2E516, 2E640, 2E680, and 2EA63]", CJK & Unihan Group Recommendations for UTC #171 Meeting
10.0	U+2CEB0..2EBE0	7,473	L2/22-061			Constable, Peter (2022-07-27), "E.1 Section 03 [Affects U+2D3EC], E.1 Section 19 [Affects U+2CF4E, 2D3EC, 2D6A7, 2D7BA, 2D979, 2DA74, 2DA97, 2DC13, 2DDC0, 2DF10, 2DF78, 2E05A, 2E0AE, 2E516, 2E640, 2E680, and 2EA63]", Approved Minutes of UTC Meeting 171
10.0	U+2CEB0..2EBE0	7,473	L2/22-258			Shin, SangHyun; Kim, Kyongsok (2022-10-14), Changing glyphs and IDSs of 97 KR Hanja chars containing '叱 (U+53F1)' [Affects U+2D1CC, 2D1CD, 2D1DD, 2D1E4, 2D1F7, 2D203, 2D256, 2D266, 2D2A2, 2D2AC, and 2D2DA]
10.0	U+2CEB0..2EBE0	7,473	L2/22-247			Lunde, Ken (2022-11-01), "25) L2/22-258", CJK & Unihan Group Recommendations for UTC #173 Meeting
10.0	U+2CEB0..2EBE0	7,473	L2/22-241			Constable, Peter (2022-11-09), "E.1 25) L2/22-258", Approved Minutes of UTC Meeting 173
10.0	U+2CEB0..2EBE0	7,473	L2/23-245		N2642	Jiang, Kushim (2023-09-16), Proposal to update the reference glyphs for 3 characters [Affects U+203D8 and 25B9F]
10.0	U+2CEB0..2EBE0	7,473	L2/23-237R			Lunde, Ken (2023-11-02), "22 [Affects U+203D8 and 25B9F]", CJK & Unihan Group Recommendations for UTC #177 Meeting
10.0	U+2CEB0..2EBE0	7,473	L2/23-231			Constable, Peter (2023-12-08), "Section 22 [Affects U+203D8 and 25B9F]", UTC #177 Minutes
