= Sawndip literature =

Literature using Zhuang characters

Sawndip literature consists of folk songs, operas, poems, scriptures, letters, contracts, and court documents written over one thousand years in the Zhuang language in Sawndip script. The Zhuang people produced this literature. The works include both indigenous works and translations from Chinese, fact, fiction, religious, and secular materials. It gives insight into the life of the Zhuang and the people they have had contact with over two millennia. Only a small percentage has been published.

== Characteristics ==
Sawndip literature is traditionally written in verse. Folk songs, or stories, are evolved over time. For example, Fwen Ciengzyeingz, meaning "Song to tell others", gives a philosophy of life, and of which Liáng Tíngwàng (梁庭望) observed (from the proper pronouns used), the song's origin was in the Sui–Tang dynasties and with its final form was set almost a thousand years later in the latter part of the Ming dynasty.

The two main verse types are either five or seven characters per line, and commonly four lines to a stanza. In some texts lines are resung several times in set combinations, although the lines are only written once. Waist rhyming is common. Older manuscripts for antiphonal songs only record the male lyrics, whereas modern versions may include both male and female lyrics.

== Notable works ==
=== The Orphan Girl and the Rich Girl (Cinderella) ===
One fairy tale that has attracted much attention is "The orphan girl and the rich girl", an early version of Cinderella (Zhuang "Dahgyax Dahbengz" Dah - indicates female, gyax means "orphan" and bengz means "rich") found in Zhuang opera scripts. Ye Xian, a 9th-century Chinese translation of the Zhuang story was written in the Miscellaneous Morsels from Youyang and the modern Sawndip versions are quite similar. Analysis suggests these versions took shape no later than the 10th century.

=== Song about Tang Emperors ===
"Song about Tang Emperors" ("𠯘唐皇" Fwen Dangzvuengz), is about 5,000 lines long, and mainly about Li Dan the fifth and ninth emperor of the Tang dynasty born in 662. The content is similar to sections of the 18th-century Chinese historical novel Xue gang fan tang (薛刚反唐); hence, it may be an adaptation. Some manuscript evidence suggests it was already in circulation in the 17th century.

=== The house-building song ===
"The house-building song" has been sung for over a thousand years. It has two parts. The first describes the construction of a traditional stilt house and the second part the customs to ward evil away from the new home.

=== The Origin of the Bronze Drum ===
"The Origin of the Bronze Drum" tells of the origin of bronze drums that are like "stars" (such drums have a star in the middle of them), that they are as many as the stars of the sky and like stars can ward off evil spirits.
