= The Legend of Wenlong =

"The Legend of Wenlong" is an ancient folk story of Han Chinese origin, that was early on adopted by several people groups in Southern China including the Zhuang. It is also known by the name of the associated Chinese opera Liu Wenlong and the Water-chestnut Mirror. It is now a traditional song of the Zhuang people that is sung at the Dragon Boat Festival in some places.

'The lost Nanxi opera version of Liu Wenlong and the Water-chestnut Mirror is the source of the versions found among the Zhuang, Dong, Buyi, Maonan and Mulao peoples of Southern China.' The story has at least an 800-year-old history and remains a form of cultural entertainment to this day both as a traditional Zhuang opera and within a number of Chinese opera adaptations.

== Origin and lost Nanxi version ==
In 16th century Ming dynasty the famous painter, poet, writer and dramatist Xu Wei mentions "The Legend of Wenlong" in a list of 65 12th century Song dynasty Nanxi operas under the title 刘文龙菱花镜 (Liu Wenlong and the Water-chestnut Mirror). However, all copies of this opera have been lost. The earlier 15th century Yongle Encyclopedia, the largest known encyclopedia at the time, mentions the opera-play Liu Wenlong.

== Zhuang version ==
Although the original version has been lost, the general content of Liu Wenlong and the Water-chestnut Mirror is still known to a degree. A comparison of the roles and plot make it clear that the Zhuang version is adapted from this lost opera-play. Since there is no record of when its transition from Chinese took place, it is assumed to have happened from the Song dynasty onwards, most likely during the Ming dynasty. It has been preserved in written form using the traditional Zhuang writing system, Sawndip since the Ming or Qing dynasties. Although their lengths vary, most of the Sawndip manuscripts are about 500 lines long. Some versions have five characters per line and others seven characters per line.

=== Synopsis ===
The story is sometimes set in the Tang dynasty. In his teens, Wenlong marries Lanshi, an arrangement by his parents. Both are intelligent and good looking. The young couple love each other very much. Because Wenlong is so bright, he is ordered by the Emperor to go to the capital to become an official. When they say goodbye, as a reminder to be faithful, the couple split a metal mirror in two, and Lanshi gives Wenlong one of a pair of shoes she has made herself and keeps the other. They are apart for many years but remain faithful to each other. Whilst Wenlong gone, Wenzong tries to court the beautiful Lanshi to become his wife. He even says that Wenlong must be dead, but Lanshi refuses to marry him. Unable to convince Lanshi, Wenzong talks to her parents and eventually convinces them to agree, because Wenlong has been gone for 15 years. A wedding date is fixed for a few days' time. Wenlong has a vivid dream of his home and the next day sets out from the capital to return there. The story ends with the return of Wenlong on the day of Wenzong and Lanshi's wedding. Wenlong, nearing his home town, meets a woman crying by the river, and talking to her discovers she is his wife. Wenlong has the shoe made by his wife many years before and his wife then fetches the other shoe which she has kept safe for many years. They are re-united and happy at last. (In some versions there is a longer ending recounting how Wenlong and Wenzong fight and ending with Wenzong being justly beheaded.)

== Modern Chinese opera versions ==
Whilst sometimes maligned by academia for not being based on Liu Wenlong and the Water-chestnut Mirror, various forms of modern Chinese opera have stories of Wenlong. One such is 刘文龙上京 (Liu Wenlong goes to the Capital), in Huangmei opera. Another is Zheng Chaoyang's 1999 opera 洗马桥 (literally "wash horse bridge"), her own adaptation of the tradition, in which Wenlong comes from Wenzhou.

== Dong version ==
A Dong version 门龙 (Chinese: Menlong) belongs to the same tradition as Liu Wenlong and the Water-chestnut Mirror and the Zhuang versions.

== Debate ==
The relationship between Liu Wenlong and the Water-chestnut Mirror and other operas with extant manuscripts is the subject of ongoing debate. Whilst the Nanxi opera is still considered lost, copies of later Chinese operas which have similar stories have been found. For example, the Ming dynasty work 刘希必金钗记 (lit. "Liu Xibi Golden Hairpin story"), a copy of which was discovered in 1975 in Guangdong, may have a common source with Liu Wenlong and the Water-chestnut Mirror, though some argue it is an adaptation. Other versions include the 100-year-old late Qing dynasty manuscript of 刘文龙赶考 ("Liu Wenlong goes to take the civil service examination"), discovered in 1952 in Anhui. In 1960 in Fuijan, among a discovery of a dozen Nanxi manuscripts there was a partial manuscript simply entitled "Liu Wenlong". These discoveries provide fuel for academic research and progress.

== Published Zhuang versions ==
In 1987, a Chinese translation of the Zhuang song by Lan Hong'en was published under the title 文龙与肖尼 ("Wenlong and Xiaoni"), by which it is sometimes better known.

In 1998, the Guangxi Minorities Ancient Literature Bureau printed a Youjiang Zhuang version called 唱文隆 ("The Song of Wenlong"). It is 488 lines long with seven Sawndip characters on each line and a Chinese translation on the opposite side of the page.

In 2006, a Pingguo version, also in Sawndip, arranged by 潘润环, is also 488 lines long in stanzas of four lines but with only five characters per line. The Chinese title is "唱文隆", the Zhuang title "Fwen Vwnzlungz" and the Sawndip title "𠯘文隆".

== Names of characters ==
The names of characters in the story and the characters used to write them vary in different versions. For readability the same English renderings of names are usually used throughout this article.
