= Sawndip =

Writing system for the Zhuang language

Sawndip Old Zhuang script
- Characters for the Zhuang words saw 'character' and ndip 'uncooked'
- Script type: Logographic
- Period: 7th century – present
- Languages: Zhuang, Bouyei

Related scripts
- Parent systems: Oracle bone script: Han script; Sawndip

Sawndip (Sawndip: 𭨡𮄫; (Note: The character for saw meaning either book or written character, 𭨡, has a 書 'book' radical on the left and a 史 'scholar' radical on the right. Similarly, ndip 'raw', 'uncooked', 'unripe', 𮄫, is composed of the ⽴ 'STAND' and ⽣ 'LIFE' radicals. At present, there are limitations in displaying Zhuang logograms as many have only recently been encoded in Unicode and are only supported by a few fonts. Sawndip characters have not been standardised, and different writers use different characters for the same word; the examples here are from Sawndip Sawdenj.) Zhuang pronunciation: [θaɯ˨˦ɗip˥]) are Chinese characters used to write the Zhuang languages in the Chinese provinces of Guangxi and Yunnan. Sawndip is a Zhuang word that means "immature characters". The Zhuang word for Chinese characters used in the Chinese languages is sawgun (𭨡倱 'Han characters'); gun is the Zhuang term for the Han Chinese. Even now, in traditional and less formal domains, Sawndip is more often used than alphabetical scripts.

== Names ==
Sawndip is also called old Zhuang script, usually used to distinguish it from the Latin-based Standard Zhuang. In Standard Chinese, the old Zhuang script is called Gu Zhuangzi (古壮字; 古壯字; 'old Zhuang characters') or Fangkuai Zhuangzi (方块壮字; 方塊壯字; 'square shaped Zhuang characters').

Sawndip and its synonyms can be used with a spectrum of narrow to broad meanings. The narrowest meaning confines its use just to characters created by Zhuang to write Zhuang and excludes existing Chinese characters. At its broadest, it includes all the "square" characters used to write Zhuang regardless of whether they are of Chinese or Zhuang origin. However, it is not always possible to determine the origin of a character. In this article the inclusive broader meaning is usually used.

In Chinese, while usually old Zhuang script (古壮字; 古壯字) and square Zhuang script (方块壮字; 方塊壯字) are synonymous, when used contrastively, the former is restricted to those characters used before the founding of the Republic of China in 1911.

== Characteristics ==
These three Zhuang logograms (𭒹𮬭鴓) from the Sawndip Sawdenj (the first two of which were added to Unicode 10.0 in June 2017) are formed as follows: the components ⼒ 'POWER', 六 'six' and 必 'must' respectively indicate the sound, and the components ⼦ 'CHILD', ⿃ 'BIRD' and ⿃ 'BIRD' for the term lwg roegbit, literally 'child bird-duck', meaning "wild duckling".

Sawndip is made up of a combination of Chinese characters, Chinese-like characters, and other symbols. Like Chinese it can be written horizontally from left to right, or vertically from top to bottom. The script has never been standardized; some morphosyllables have more than a dozen associated variant glyphs. According to Zhang Yuansheng (张元生), characters not also used in Chinese usually make up about 20% of Sawndip texts, although some texts may be composed almost entirely of characters also used in Chinese.

=== Classification ===
Different scholars categorize Sawndip in slightly different ways. Displayed below is the estimated frequency of different types of characters by Holm:

Character types in Sawndip
Mode of reading	Number	Percentage
Phonetic	2303	71.3%
Semantic	78	2.4%
Phono-semantic	40	1.2%
Chinese loan	708	21.9%
Zhuang	97	3.0%
Dubious	5	0.2%
Total	3231	100%

According to Bauer, Sawndip characters can be categorized using a more complex system than the six traditional classification principles:

- Symbols that do not resemble Chinese characters, and are borrowed from non-Chinese writing systems such as the Latin alphabet and (possibly) Burmese
- Non-standard Chinese-like characters created as ideographic compounds
- Non-standard Chinese-like characters created as phono-semantic compounds
  - Example: bya 'mountain' is often written as⟨岜⟩, containing the ideographic ⼭ 'MOUNTAIN' in conjunction with phonetic 巴 (ba).
  - Example: vunz 'person' is often written as ⟨伝⟩, containing the ideographic radical 亻 'MAN' in conjunction with phonetic 云 (yún).
- Standard Chinese characters borrowed solely for their pronunciations, and do not share the same original meaning in Chinese (in accordance with the phonetic loan principle)
  - Example: miz 'to have' is often written as ⟨眉⟩, a character that is pronounced in Mandarin Chinese as méi, but which means 'eyebrow'.
- Non-standard Chinese-like characters created specifically for Zhuang to indicate the meaning of certain morphosyllables (in accordance with indicative ideograms)
- Standard Chinese characters representing loanwords or etymologically related morphosyllables from Chinese
  - Example: boi 'cup' is written as ⟨盃⟩, a variant character of 杯 (bēi; 'cup' in Chinese).
- Standard Chinese characters borrowed solely for their meanings and do not have a matching reading in Zhuang with Chinese
- New characters made by juxtaposing a pair of Chinese characters that "spell out" the pronunciation of the Zhuang word as in the traditional Chinese fanqie system, with one character representing the initial consonant and the other the rest of the syllable.

== History ==
The script has been used for centuries, mainly by Zhuang singers and shamans, to record poems, scriptures, folktales, myths, songs, play scripts, medical prescriptions, family genealogies and contracts, but exactly when it came into being is not known. It is usually reckoned that Sawndip started to be used over one thousand years ago in the Tang dynasty or earlier. However a study comparing Sawndip with the similar but different neighbouring chữ Nôm script of Vietnam suggested that the script started at latest in the 12th century at about the same time as chữ Nôm.

=== Early vernacular characters ===
Even before the Tang dynasty, Zhuang or closely related languages were written down using characters that were either Chinese or made up of Chinese components. Whether these are viewed as Sawndip, or as some sort of precursor to Sawndip, depends not only the evidence itself, but also differing views of what counts as Sawndip and from what era the term Zhuang can be applied.

Some scholars say Sawndip started in the Han dynasty and note the occurrence on words of Zhuang origin in ancient Chinese dictionaries such as 犩 which is Sawndip for Zhuang vaiz ('water buffalo') and in section 19 of the Erya is given as having similar pronunciation and means 牛 ('cattle').

There are some similarities in the poetical style of "The Song of the Yue boatman" (Chinese: 越人歌; pinyin: Yuèrén Gē) from 528 BC and the Zhuang "Fwen" style. Wei Qingwen (韦庆稳; 韋慶穩) has interpreted the song by reading the characters as Zhuang and some consider the written version and other such songs to be a forerunner though not an example of Sawndip, it has also been interpreted as being Thai, Dong and Cham.

=== Tang dynasty (7th–9th centuries) ===
The fact that Zhuang readings of borrowed Chinese characters often match Early Middle Chinese suggests a Sui–Tang date, however it has been noted these could also be explained as later borrowings from conservative Pinghua varieties. Chinese characters were already in use in the Zhuang area, as illustrated by two Tang dynasty steles entitled 'Eulogy of the six-sided courtyard' (六合坚固大宅颂; 六合堅固大宅頌; Liù hé jiāngùdàzhái sòng) in 682 and 'Monument of Zhi Cheng city' (智城碑; Zhì chéng bēi) in 697. Although these are written in Chinese, the latter contains a number of non-standard characters. One of these is the Sawndip character consisting of 𥹫 'rice' over ⽥ 'FIELD' for naz 'paddy field'.

=== Song dynasty (10th–13th centuries) ===
Several Song dynasty Han Chinese authors give examples of 'vernacular characters' (土俗字; Tǔsúzì) used in Guangxi such as Zhou Qufei in Lingwai Daida and Fan Chengda in the Guihai yuheng zhi (桂海虞衡志) saying that such characters were common in the area and used in legal documents such as indictments, complaints, receipts and contracts.

Table of characters noted in the Song dynasty Guihai yuheng zhi and also in 1986 Sawndip dictionary:

Sawndip	𨱥	䦟	𡘫	仦	𡚻
Zhuang	daemq, gaenq	onj, vaenj	onj, vaenj	neux	dah
English	short	steady	steady	weak	used addressing a lady

=== Ming dynasty (14th–17th centuries) ===
Whilst no manuscripts from the Ming dynasty have been found, dozens of classic Sawndip works that survive to this day were first written during this dynasty or earlier. Some consider this to be the most abundant period of Sawndip literature. Exact dating is difficult in part because some songs were composed and transmitted orally before being written down, such as Fwen Ciengzyeingz ('Song to tell others'), which Liang Tingwang (梁庭望) has stated whilst containing some content comes from centuries before that was written down during the Ming dynasty. Similarly "Songs of March", "Songs of the Daytime", "Songs of the Road", and "Songs of House Building" where first created between the Tang and Song dynasties or earlier and certainly written down at latest during the Ming dynasty.

Some songs were both created and written down during the Ming dynasty. Fwen Caeg "Songs of War" (贼歌; Zéi gē) from Pingguo which is considered to be such despite some lines which are later additions. Fwen nganx 欢𭪤 ('The Dragon Eye Fruit Song'), a love story, is also from the Ming era.

A number of songs written in Sawndip are stories which are originally of Han origin but for hundreds of years have been part of the Zhuang tradition, such as 𠯘唐皇 Fwen Dangzvuengz ('Song about Tang emperors') about Li Dan and 𠯘英台 Fwen Yinghdaiz ('Song about Yingtai') and 𠯘文隆 Fwen Vwnzlungz ('Song about Wenlong') to name but a few are reckoned to have first been written down in Sawndip during the Ming dynasty or earlier. In the case of Fwen Vwnzlungz, the original Han story itself has been lost.

=== Qing dynasty (mid-17th–19th centuries) ===
Thousands of Sawndip manuscripts from the Qing period survive to this day. One well known old surviving text is the Yuefeng (粵風) book of folksongs from Guiping, published in the 18th century. A book entitled Taiping Spring (太平春) that contains a number of songs and is kept in Lingyun is dated as 1682.

Another source is the Huayu yiyu (華夷譯語 'Barbarian vocabulary') compiled by the Bureau of Translators in the mid-18th century on the order of the Qianlong Emperor, and now held in the archives of the Imperial Palace Museum. The survey of western Guangxi (太平府夷语通译; 太平府夷語通譯; Tàipíng fǔ yíyǔ tōngyì) was less thorough than other parts of the empire, consisting of just 71 to 170 items from three locations. Each entry consists of a Zhuang word written in the Zhuang script, with its pronunciation and meaning given in Chinese. It demonstrates both the wide use and lack of standardization of Sawndip.

=== Modern era (20th–21st centuries) ===
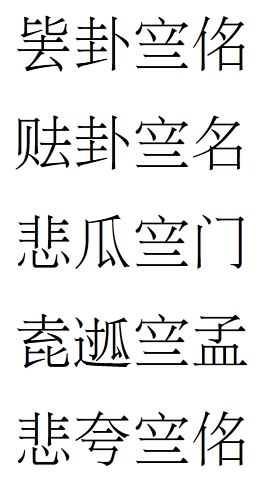
Sawndip is not standardized. Here are the same four Standard Zhuang words—bae 𭆛/[⿰贝去]/悲/[⿱去比] 'go', gvaq 卦/瓜/𮞖 'pass', ranz 𭓨 'house', mwngz 佲/名/门/孟 'you'—as written in five modern Pingguo sources. These agree on the choice of character for only one of the four words, ranz 𭓨 'house'.

While after the introduction of an official alphabet-based script in 1957, Sawndip have seldom been used in some formal domains such as newspapers, laws and official documents, they continue to be used in less formal domains such as writing songs, and personal notes and messages.

After the Chinese Communist Revolution in 1949, communist revolutionary propaganda was written using sawndip. In 1957 an official romanized Zhuang script was introduced. However, there are major phonetic and lexical differences between Zhuang dialects, and the Latin-based system is based on the Wuming dialect. Because of this and other reasons, there still are many Zhuang speakers that prefer to write Zhuang using sawndip. Even though it is not the official script at grassroots level various departments have continued to use Sawndip on occasions to get their message across. Coming into the 21st century, Sawndip understanding and usage of Sawndip remains significant: of those surveyed in two dialect areas, just over one third said that they understood Sawndip, and about one in ten that they use Sawndip in most domains. These rates are approximately twice those for the romanized script: with only one-sixth saying they understood it, and only one in twenty saying they used it in most domains.

After five years in preparation, the Sawndip Sawdenj (古壮字字典; 古壯字字典; Gǔ Zhuàngzì zìdiǎn; 'Dictionary of Ancient Zhuang Characters') was published in 1989 with 4,900 entries and over 10,000 characters, and is the first and only dictionary of Zhuang characters published to date. In 2008 it was announced that work was to begin on a new dictionary called The Large Chinese Dictionary of Ancient Zhuang Characters (中华古壮字大字典; 中華古壯字大字典). In 2012 an enlarged facsimile of the 1989 dictionary was published with a different cover.

== Unicode ==
Unicode versions 1 to 8 included some Sawndip characters that are frequently used in the Chinese names for places in Guangxi, such as 岜 bya (Chinese: bā) meaning 'mountain' or 崬 ndoeng (Chinese: dōng) meaning 'forest', and are therefore included in Chinese dictionaries, and hence also in Chinese character sets and also some that are from other non-Zhuang character sets. Over one thousand Sawndip characters were included in the CJK Unified Ideographs Extension F block that was added to Unicode 10.0 in June 2017, another set of over one thousand in the CJK Unified Ideographs Extension G block added to Unicode 13.0 in 2020, over 400 in the CJK Unified Ideographs Extension H block added to Unicode 15.0 in 2022. More were added in CJK Unified Ideographs Extension J in 2025.

== Literature ==
For over one thousand years the Zhuang have used Sawndip to write a wide variety of literature, including folk songs, operas, poems, scriptures, letters, contract, and court documents. Sawndip literature is often though not always in verse. Only a small percentage of Sawndip literature has been published. Traditional songs, or stories, are often adapted over time, and new works continue to be written to this day.

== Regional differences ==
With regional differences, as with other aspects of Sawndip scholars express a number of differing ideas.

One of the first systematic studies of Sawndip that covered more than one location was Zhang Yuansheng's 1984 examination of 1114 Sawndip, mainly from Wuming but also including some characters from 37 other locations. Zhang found substantial variation between dialect areas, and even within locales.

In 2013, David Holm reported a geographical survey of the script, comparing characters used for 60 words in texts from 45 locations in Guangxi and neighbouring areas. He found that regional variations in the script often did not correlate with dialect groups, which he attributes to importation of characters from other regions, as well as subsequent sound change. However, he claims to have found a clear geographical division in terms of the branch of Chinese that provided the pronunciation of borrowed characters. In Guizhou and northern Guangxi, character readings correspond to Southwest Mandarin, which was brought to the area by the armies of the Ming dynasty. In central and southwest Guangxi, they closely match Pinghua, which is derived from the speech of Han dynasty immigrants. Holm states that while both Pinghua and Zhuang have changed over this period, this has generally been in parallel, making it difficult to date the readings. Scholars studying the script used in Guizhou associate its origins with the introduction of Chinese officials in the early Qing dynasty.

== Example text ==
From Article 1 of the Universal Declaration of Human Rights in Northern Zhuang:

Traditional form:

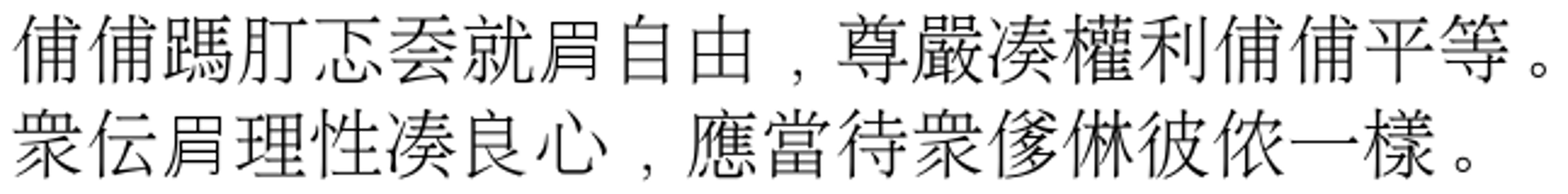

Simplified form:

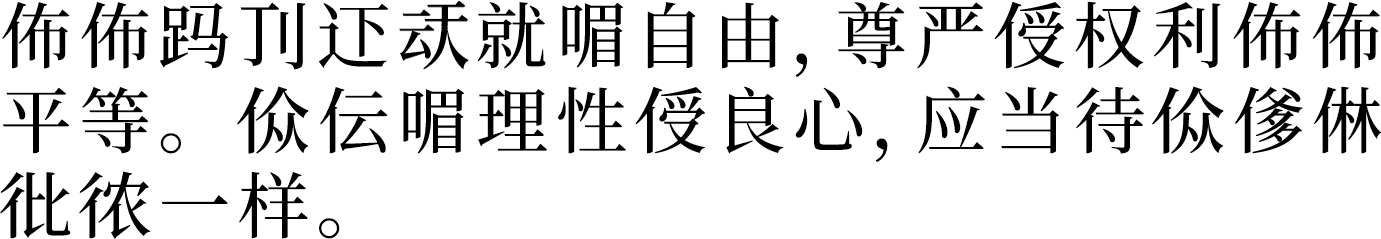

- Latin transcription (1957 orthography): Bouч bouч ma dəŋƨ laзƃɯn couƅ miƨ cɯyouƨ, cinƅyenƨ cəuƽ genƨli bouчbouч biŋƨdəŋз. Gyɵŋƽ vunƨ miƨ liзsiŋ cəuƽ lieŋƨsim, ɯŋdaŋ daiƅ gyɵngƽ de lumз beiчnueŋч ityieŋƅ.
- Latin transcription (1982 orthography): Boux boux ma daengz lajmbwn couh miz cwyouz, cunhyenz caeuq genzli bouxboux bingzdaengj. Gyoengq vunz miz lijsing caeuq liengzsim, wngdang daih gyoengq de lumj beixnuengx ityiengh.
- Traditional Unicode characters: 俌俌𮜃𦘭忑𭑆就𬚳自由，尊嚴凑權利俌俌平等。衆伝𬚳理性凑良心，應當待衆𬿇㑣彼侬一樣。
- Simplified Unicode characters (with currently unencoded characters represented as Ideographic Description Sequences in brackets): 佈佈𲃖[⿰丁刂]𨑜[⿰云天]就𠷯自由，尊严𪝈权利佈佈平等。𬾀伝𠷯理性𪝈良心，应当待𬾀𬿇㑣[⿰彳比][⿰彳农]一样。

== See also ==
- Chinese characters
- Chinese family of scripts
- Chữ Nôm
- Sawgoek
- Standard Zhuang
