= CJK Unified Ideographs Extension I =

- Range: U+2EBF0..U+2EE5F (624 code points)
- Plane: SIP
- Scripts: Han
- Assigned: 622 code points
- Unused: 2 reserved code points

Unicode Version History
- 15.1 (2023): 622 (+622)

Unicode documentation
- Code chart ∣ Web page

CJK Unified Ideographs Extension I is a Unicode block comprising CJK Unified Ideographs included in drafts of an amendment to China's GB 18030 standard circulated in 2022 and 2023, which were fast-tracked into Unicode in 2023.

== Background ==
Unlike most other sets of CJK unified ideographs, Extension I was not prepared and submitted by the Ideographic Research Group (IRG).

GB 18030 is a mandatory national standard of the People's Republic of China (PRC). It defines a Unicode Transformation Format which retains compatibility with existing data in the earlier GBK and EUC-CN character encodings, and specifies particular Unicode characters which devices sold in China must support. Its 2022 edition, GB 18030-2022, changed a number of required characters to map to standard Unicode code points, rather than to private use area code points.

In late 2022, the PRC made a draft of a further amendment to be made to GB 18030 available for public consultation. This draft would have placed 897 new sinographic characters in Plane 10 (hexadecimal: 0A), a yet-untitled astral Unicode plane. This was motivated by a "strong need of citizen real-name certification in China". Since it would impact ISO/IEC 10646 (the Universal Coded Character Set, the ISO standard synchronised with Unicode), the draft was circulated in ISO/IEC JTC 1/SC 2, the ISO subcommittee responsible for ISO 10646. The Chinese national body maintained that "ISO/IEC 10646 do not specify the purpose of the 0A plane", which ISO 10646 denotes as "reserved for future standardization", and that this use was therefore "not inappropriate".

However, since the intent of ISO 10646 was for Plane 10 to be reserved for future allocation by ISO 10646 and Unicode via their usual ballot process, not for it to be allocated unilaterally by national standards bodies, this proposed move was criticised by experts and other national bodies as one which would "destabilize the synchronization" between GB 18030 and ISO/IEC 10646 (and thus Unicode), and which would make it impossible to conform to both with a single implementation, effectively forking Unicode. At its meeting in March 2023, the IRG emphasised the importance of providing any subsequent GB 18030 amendment drafts to IRG experts in a timely manner, and of not "using the ISO/IEC 10646 standard inappropriately".

As an alternative, the repertoire (eventually reduced to 622 characters after expert review) was fast-tracked into Unicode version 15.1 in September 2023, as the CJK Unified Ideographs Extension I block. The characters constitute the "GIDC23" Unihan source, defined as sourced from the "ID system of the Ministry of Public Security of China, 2023". The CJK Unified Ideographs Extension D block was cited as a precedent, since it comprised a repertoire of urgently needed characters (UNCs) from IRG member bodies, whereas the IRG working-set initially slated to become Extension D would instead become Extension E. For compactness, the block was allocated to the available space in the Supplementary Ideographic Plane after CJK Unified Ideographs Extension F, as opposed to on the Tertiary Ideographic Plane after CJK Unified Ideographs Extension H; this means that the CJK extension blocks are no longer in alphabetical order by extension letter. Following this, the draft GB 18030 amendment was modified to use the Extension I code points.

At its next meeting in October 2023, the IRG expressed concerns about bypassing the IRG for large collections of CJK characters, and noted that two of the characters in Extension I had, for the purposes of other regions' character sources, previously been unified with existing characters under IRG unification rules:

- Allowing for interchangeable forms of the grass radical, U+2ED9D 𮶝 CJK UNIFIED IDEOGRAPH-2ED9D corresponds to the pre-existing T-source (Taiwan) glyph for U+8286 芆 CJK UNIFIED IDEOGRAPH-8286 (referenced from CNS 11643), as well as to a proposed J-source (Japan) glyph for the same. A character corresponding to the other (G-source, i.e. Mainland China) glyph of U+8286 does exist elsewhere in more recent editions of CNS 11643, so the addition of U+2ED9D impacts the existing correspondences between CNS 11643 and Unicode although, due to neither character being in planes 1 or 2, there are no implications for the Unicode mapping of Big5.
- U+2EDE0 𮷠 CJK UNIFIED IDEOGRAPH-2EDE0 corresponds to a proposed J-source (Japan) glyph for U+8FF3 迳 CJK UNIFIED IDEOGRAPH-8FF3. It had previously been proposed as a new character twice (once with reference to CNS 11643, and once by Japan), but rejected on the basis that it was unifiable with U+8FF3. The proposed glyph was later moved to the new U+2EDE0 𮷠 CJK UNIFIED IDEOGRAPH-2EDE0 code point, per a request by the Japanese national body.

In response, the IRG recommended that, in future, submitters of proposed CJK characters be required to provide information about the impact on other CJK character sources of any disunifications proposed by the submission, and that the IRG be given time to review all large submissions of CJK characters. The IRG encouraged the Chinese body to propose solutions to the issues caused by the addition of these two characters at the next IRG meeting.

== Block ==
CJK Unified Ideographs Extension I^{[1]}^{[2]} Official Unicode Consortium code chart (PDF)
| | 0 | 1 | 2 | 3 | 4 | 5 | 6 | 7 | 8 | 9 | A | B | C | D | E | F |
| U+2EBFx | 𮯰 | 𮯱 | 𮯲 | 𮯳 | 𮯴 | 𮯵 | 𮯶 | 𮯷 | 𮯸 | 𮯹 | 𮯺 | 𮯻 | 𮯼 | 𮯽 | 𮯾 | 𮯿 |
| U+2EC0x | 𮰀 | 𮰁 | 𮰂 | 𮰃 | 𮰄 | 𮰅 | 𮰆 | 𮰇 | 𮰈 | 𮰉 | 𮰊 | 𮰋 | 𮰌 | 𮰍 | 𮰎 | 𮰏 |
| U+2EC1x | 𮰐 | 𮰑 | 𮰒 | 𮰓 | 𮰔 | 𮰕 | 𮰖 | 𮰗 | 𮰘 | 𮰙 | 𮰚 | 𮰛 | 𮰜 | 𮰝 | 𮰞 | 𮰟 |
| U+2EC2x | 𮰠 | 𮰡 | 𮰢 | 𮰣 | 𮰤 | 𮰥 | 𮰦 | 𮰧 | 𮰨 | 𮰩 | 𮰪 | 𮰫 | 𮰬 | 𮰭 | 𮰮 | 𮰯 |
| U+2EC3x | 𮰰 | 𮰱 | 𮰲 | 𮰳 | 𮰴 | 𮰵 | 𮰶 | 𮰷 | 𮰸 | 𮰹 | 𮰺 | 𮰻 | 𮰼 | 𮰽 | 𮰾 | 𮰿 |
| U+2EC4x | 𮱀 | 𮱁 | 𮱂 | 𮱃 | 𮱄 | 𮱅 | 𮱆 | 𮱇 | 𮱈 | 𮱉 | 𮱊 | 𮱋 | 𮱌 | 𮱍 | 𮱎 | 𮱏 |
| U+2EC5x | 𮱐 | 𮱑 | 𮱒 | 𮱓 | 𮱔 | 𮱕 | 𮱖 | 𮱗 | 𮱘 | 𮱙 | 𮱚 | 𮱛 | 𮱜 | 𮱝 | 𮱞 | 𮱟 |
| U+2EC6x | 𮱠 | 𮱡 | 𮱢 | 𮱣 | 𮱤 | 𮱥 | 𮱦 | 𮱧 | 𮱨 | 𮱩 | 𮱪 | 𮱫 | 𮱬 | 𮱭 | 𮱮 | 𮱯 |
| U+2EC7x | 𮱰 | 𮱱 | 𮱲 | 𮱳 | 𮱴 | 𮱵 | 𮱶 | 𮱷 | 𮱸 | 𮱹 | 𮱺 | 𮱻 | 𮱼 | 𮱽 | 𮱾 | 𮱿 |
| U+2EC8x | 𮲀 | 𮲁 | 𮲂 | 𮲃 | 𮲄 | 𮲅 | 𮲆 | 𮲇 | 𮲈 | 𮲉 | 𮲊 | 𮲋 | 𮲌 | 𮲍 | 𮲎 | 𮲏 |
| U+2EC9x | 𮲐 | 𮲑 | 𮲒 | 𮲓 | 𮲔 | 𮲕 | 𮲖 | 𮲗 | 𮲘 | 𮲙 | 𮲚 | 𮲛 | 𮲜 | 𮲝 | 𮲞 | 𮲟 |
| U+2ECAx | 𮲠 | 𮲡 | 𮲢 | 𮲣 | 𮲤 | 𮲥 | 𮲦 | 𮲧 | 𮲨 | 𮲩 | 𮲪 | 𮲫 | 𮲬 | 𮲭 | 𮲮 | 𮲯 |
| U+2ECBx | 𮲰 | 𮲱 | 𮲲 | 𮲳 | 𮲴 | 𮲵 | 𮲶 | 𮲷 | 𮲸 | 𮲹 | 𮲺 | 𮲻 | 𮲼 | 𮲽 | 𮲾 | 𮲿 |
| U+2ECCx | 𮳀 | 𮳁 | 𮳂 | 𮳃 | 𮳄 | 𮳅 | 𮳆 | 𮳇 | 𮳈 | 𮳉 | 𮳊 | 𮳋 | 𮳌 | 𮳍 | 𮳎 | 𮳏 |
| U+2ECDx | 𮳐 | 𮳑 | 𮳒 | 𮳓 | 𮳔 | 𮳕 | 𮳖 | 𮳗 | 𮳘 | 𮳙 | 𮳚 | 𮳛 | 𮳜 | 𮳝 | 𮳞 | 𮳟 |
| U+2ECEx | 𮳠 | 𮳡 | 𮳢 | 𮳣 | 𮳤 | 𮳥 | 𮳦 | 𮳧 | 𮳨 | 𮳩 | 𮳪 | 𮳫 | 𮳬 | 𮳭 | 𮳮 | 𮳯 |
| U+2ECFx | 𮳰 | 𮳱 | 𮳲 | 𮳳 | 𮳴 | 𮳵 | 𮳶 | 𮳷 | 𮳸 | 𮳹 | 𮳺 | 𮳻 | 𮳼 | 𮳽 | 𮳾 | 𮳿 |
| U+2ED0x | 𮴀 | 𮴁 | 𮴂 | 𮴃 | 𮴄 | 𮴅 | 𮴆 | 𮴇 | 𮴈 | 𮴉 | 𮴊 | 𮴋 | 𮴌 | 𮴍 | 𮴎 | 𮴏 |
| U+2ED1x | 𮴐 | 𮴑 | 𮴒 | 𮴓 | 𮴔 | 𮴕 | 𮴖 | 𮴗 | 𮴘 | 𮴙 | 𮴚 | 𮴛 | 𮴜 | 𮴝 | 𮴞 | 𮴟 |
| U+2ED2x | 𮴠 | 𮴡 | 𮴢 | 𮴣 | 𮴤 | 𮴥 | 𮴦 | 𮴧 | 𮴨 | 𮴩 | 𮴪 | 𮴫 | 𮴬 | 𮴭 | 𮴮 | 𮴯 |
| U+2ED3x | 𮴰 | 𮴱 | 𮴲 | 𮴳 | 𮴴 | 𮴵 | 𮴶 | 𮴷 | 𮴸 | 𮴹 | 𮴺 | 𮴻 | 𮴼 | 𮴽 | 𮴾 | 𮴿 |
| U+2ED4x | 𮵀 | 𮵁 | 𮵂 | 𮵃 | 𮵄 | 𮵅 | 𮵆 | 𮵇 | 𮵈 | 𮵉 | 𮵊 | 𮵋 | 𮵌 | 𮵍 | 𮵎 | 𮵏 |
| U+2ED5x | 𮵐 | 𮵑 | 𮵒 | 𮵓 | 𮵔 | 𮵕 | 𮵖 | 𮵗 | 𮵘 | 𮵙 | 𮵚 | 𮵛 | 𮵜 | 𮵝 | 𮵞 | 𮵟 |
| U+2ED6x | 𮵠 | 𮵡 | 𮵢 | 𮵣 | 𮵤 | 𮵥 | 𮵦 | 𮵧 | 𮵨 | 𮵩 | 𮵪 | 𮵫 | 𮵬 | 𮵭 | 𮵮 | 𮵯 |
| U+2ED7x | 𮵰 | 𮵱 | 𮵲 | 𮵳 | 𮵴 | 𮵵 | 𮵶 | 𮵷 | 𮵸 | 𮵹 | 𮵺 | 𮵻 | 𮵼 | 𮵽 | 𮵾 | 𮵿 |
| U+2ED8x | 𮶀 | 𮶁 | 𮶂 | 𮶃 | 𮶄 | 𮶅 | 𮶆 | 𮶇 | 𮶈 | 𮶉 | 𮶊 | 𮶋 | 𮶌 | 𮶍 | 𮶎 | 𮶏 |
| U+2ED9x | 𮶐 | 𮶑 | 𮶒 | 𮶓 | 𮶔 | 𮶕 | 𮶖 | 𮶗 | 𮶘 | 𮶙 | 𮶚 | 𮶛 | 𮶜 | 𮶝 | 𮶞 | 𮶟 |
| U+2EDAx | 𮶠 | 𮶡 | 𮶢 | 𮶣 | 𮶤 | 𮶥 | 𮶦 | 𮶧 | 𮶨 | 𮶩 | 𮶪 | 𮶫 | 𮶬 | 𮶭 | 𮶮 | 𮶯 |
| U+2EDBx | 𮶰 | 𮶱 | 𮶲 | 𮶳 | 𮶴 | 𮶵 | 𮶶 | 𮶷 | 𮶸 | 𮶹 | 𮶺 | 𮶻 | 𮶼 | 𮶽 | 𮶾 | 𮶿 |
| U+2EDCx | 𮷀 | 𮷁 | 𮷂 | 𮷃 | 𮷄 | 𮷅 | 𮷆 | 𮷇 | 𮷈 | 𮷉 | 𮷊 | 𮷋 | 𮷌 | 𮷍 | 𮷎 | 𮷏 |
| U+2EDDx | 𮷐 | 𮷑 | 𮷒 | 𮷓 | 𮷔 | 𮷕 | 𮷖 | 𮷗 | 𮷘 | 𮷙 | 𮷚 | 𮷛 | 𮷜 | 𮷝 | 𮷞 | 𮷟 |
| U+2EDEx | 𮷠 | 𮷡 | 𮷢 | 𮷣 | 𮷤 | 𮷥 | 𮷦 | 𮷧 | 𮷨 | 𮷩 | 𮷪 | 𮷫 | 𮷬 | 𮷭 | 𮷮 | 𮷯 |
| U+2EDFx | 𮷰 | 𮷱 | 𮷲 | 𮷳 | 𮷴 | 𮷵 | 𮷶 | 𮷷 | 𮷸 | 𮷹 | 𮷺 | 𮷻 | 𮷼 | 𮷽 | 𮷾 | 𮷿 |
| U+2EE0x | 𮸀 | 𮸁 | 𮸂 | 𮸃 | 𮸄 | 𮸅 | 𮸆 | 𮸇 | 𮸈 | 𮸉 | 𮸊 | 𮸋 | 𮸌 | 𮸍 | 𮸎 | 𮸏 |
| U+2EE1x | 𮸐 | 𮸑 | 𮸒 | 𮸓 | 𮸔 | 𮸕 | 𮸖 | 𮸗 | 𮸘 | 𮸙 | 𮸚 | 𮸛 | 𮸜 | 𮸝 | 𮸞 | 𮸟 |
| U+2EE2x | 𮸠 | 𮸡 | 𮸢 | 𮸣 | 𮸤 | 𮸥 | 𮸦 | 𮸧 | 𮸨 | 𮸩 | 𮸪 | 𮸫 | 𮸬 | 𮸭 | 𮸮 | 𮸯 |
| U+2EE3x | 𮸰 | 𮸱 | 𮸲 | 𮸳 | 𮸴 | 𮸵 | 𮸶 | 𮸷 | 𮸸 | 𮸹 | 𮸺 | 𮸻 | 𮸼 | 𮸽 | 𮸾 | 𮸿 |
| U+2EE4x | 𮹀 | 𮹁 | 𮹂 | 𮹃 | 𮹄 | 𮹅 | 𮹆 | 𮹇 | 𮹈 | 𮹉 | 𮹊 | 𮹋 | 𮹌 | 𮹍 | 𮹎 | 𮹏 |
| U+2EE5x | 𮹐 | 𮹑 | 𮹒 | 𮹓 | 𮹔 | 𮹕 | 𮹖 | 𮹗 | 𮹘 | 𮹙 | 𮹚 | 𮹛 | 𮹜 | 𮹝 | | |
Notes 1.As of Unicode version 17.0 2.Grey areas indicate non-assigned code points

The CJK Unified Ideographs Extension I block has two ideographic variation sequences registered in the Unicode Ideographic Variation Database (IVD). These sequences specify the desired glyph variant for a given Unicode character.

== History ==
The following Unicode-related documents record the purpose and process of defining specific characters in the CJK Unified Ideographs Extension I block:

| Version | Final code points (Note: Proposed code points and characters names may differ from final code points and names) | Count | L2 ID | WG2 ID | IRG ID | Document |
|---|---|---|---|---|---|---|
| 15.1 | U+2EBF0..2EE5D | 622 | L2/23-011 | | | Lunde, Ken (2023-01-11), "18) GB 18030-2022 Amendment", CJK & Unihan Group Recommendations for UTC #174 Meeting |
| 15.1 | U+2EBF0..2EE5D | 622 | L2/23-057 | N5201 | N2591 | Draft GB 18030-2022 Amendment Feedback & Recommendations, 2023-02-03 |
| 15.1 | U+2EBF0..2EE5D | 622 | L2/23-100 | | | GB 18030-2022 Amendment, Draft 2 + Disposition of Comments, Draft 1, 2023-04-10 |
| 15.1 | U+2EBF0..2EE5D | 622 | L2/23-082 | | | Lunde, Ken (2023-04-22), "02 and 03", CJK & Unihan Group Recommendations for UTC #175 Meeting |
| 15.1 | U+2EBF0..2EE5D | 622 | L2/23-106 | N5214 | | Lunde, Ken (2023-04-24), "The Alternate Proposal—Unicode Version 15.1", Proposal to provisionally assign or accept 603 urgently-needed ideographs |
| 15.1 | U+2EBF0..2EE5D | 622 | L2/23-076 | | | Constable, Peter (2023-05-01), "E.4.2 Proposal to provisionally assign or accept 603 urgently-needed ideographs", UTC #175 Minutes |
| 15.1 | U+2EBF0..2EE5D | 622 | L2/23-114R | N5214R2 | | Lunde, Ken (2023-07-05), Proposal to encode 622 urgently needed ideographs in UCS |
| 15.1 | U+2EBF0..2EE5D | 622 | L2/23-115 | | | Constable, Peter (2023-05-01), USNB Comments on Draft 2 of GB 18030-2020 Amendment 1 and recommendation for ISO/IEC 10646:2022 Amendment 2 |
| 15.1 | U+2EBF0..2EE5D | 622 | L2/23-154 | N5238 | | Revision of 622 UNCs of China (Feedback on WG2 N5214), 2023-06-30 |
| 15.1 | U+2EBF0..2EE5D | 622 | L2/23-163 | | | Lunde, Ken (2023-07-11), "01", CJK & Unihan Group Recommendations for UTC #176 Meeting |
| 15.1 | U+2EBF0..2EE5D | 622 | L2/23-157 | | | Constable, Peter (2023-07-31), "E.1 Section 1 and E.1 Section 9 [Affects U+2EDE3]", UTC #176 Minutes |
