= Teoma =

Internet search engine

- Website type: Search Engine
- Available in: English
- Launched: April 2001; 25 years ago
- Current status: Defunct

Teoma (from Scottish Gaelic teòma "expert") was an Internet search engine founded in April 2000 by Professor Apostolos Gerasoulis and his colleagues at Rutgers University in New Jersey. Professor Tao Yang from the University of California, Santa Barbara co-led technology R&D. Their research grew out of the 1998 DiscoWeb project. The original research was published in the paper, "DiscoWeb: Applying Link Analysis to Web Search".

== History ==
The Teoma search engine was officially launched in April 2001.

Ask Jeeves, Inc acquired Teoma on September 18, 2001 for over $1.5 million. On January 9, 2002, Ask Jeeves announced that it had integrated Teoma's search technology into Ask Jeeves.

Teoma 2.0 was released on January 21, 2003, which boasted improvements to search result relevancy, additions to search tools and more advanced search functions.

On February 26, 2006, the Teoma search engine was rebranded and redirected to search.ask.com. In mid-April 2010, Teoma relaunched with similar search results to Ask.

As of December 2010, Ask.com referred to the Teoma algorithm as the ExpertRank algorithm.

== Growth ==
In 2002, Nielsen//NetRatings reported that Teoma had grown by 175%, making it the third most popular search engine in the United States. Teoma's year-over-year growth in terms of number of searches from 2002 to 2003 was 51%.

== See also ==
- List of search engines
