= Apostolos Gerasoulis =

American computer scientist

- Born: August 19, 1952 (age 74); Ioannina, Greece
- Education: Stony Brook University
- Occupations: Executive Vice President, Search Technology of Ask.com
- Spouse: Xiaolan Zhang (1994–present)
- Children: 2

Apostolos Gerasoulis is a Greek professor of computer science at Rutgers University, and the co-creator of Teoma, an Internet search engine that powers Ask.com, which Apostolos co-founded along with his colleagues at Rutgers in 2000. Apostolos later went on to serve as the vice president of search technology at Ask.com, before leaving the company in 2010. Gerasoulis has appeared in TV commercials for Ask.com.
