= Tao Yang =

Chinese computer scientist

Tao Yang is a Chinese-American computer scientist. Yang is the Chief Scientist and Senior Vice President of Ask.com for web search. He is also a tenured professor in Computer Science at the University of California, Santa Barbara.

== Biography ==
Yang received his B.S. degree in computer science from Zhejiang University in 1984. In 1987, Yang received his M.E. degree in Artificial Intelligence from Zhejiang University. Yang obtained his M.Sc in 1990 and Ph.D. in 1993 both in computer science from Rutgers University.

Yang joined the Department of Computer Science at University of California, Santa Barbara in 1993.

== Research and business ==
Yang specializes in parallel and distributed systems, Internet search, and parallel scientific computing. He has co-authored over eighty journal and conference papers.

Together with Apostolos Gerasoulis, Yang ran research and development of the Teoma search engine from its startup stage in 2000 and after it was acquired by Ask Jeeves (now Ask.com) in 2001.

Teoma has been the backend search engine for Ask.com since December 2001, competing with other search engines such as Google and Yahoo!.

== Awards ==
- 1994, Research Initiation Award, from United States National Science Foundation (NSF)
- 1997, CAREER Award, from NSF
- 2002, Noble Jeeviant Award, from AskJeeves
