= CJK Unified Ideographs Extension E =

- Range: U+2B820..U+2CEAF (5,776 code points)
- Plane: SIP
- Scripts: Han
- Assigned: 5,774 code points
- Unused: 2 reserved code points

Unicode Version History
- 8.0 (2015): 5,762 (+5,762)
- 17.0 (2025): 5,774 (+12)

Unicode documentation
- Code chart ∣ Web page

CJK Unified Ideographs Extension E is a Unicode block containing rare and historic CJK ideographs for Chinese, Japanese, Korean, and Vietnamese submitted to the Ideographic Research Group between 2006 and 2013, excluding the characters submitted as "urgently needed" between 2006 and 2009, which were included in CJK Unified Ideographs Extension D.

The block has dozens of ideographic variation sequences registered in the Unicode Ideographic Variation Database (IVD). These sequences specify the desired glyph variant for a given Unicode character.

== Block ==
CJK Unified Ideographs Extension E^{[1]}^{[2]} Official Unicode Consortium code chart (PDF)
	0	1	2	3	4	5	6	7	8	9	A	B	C	D	E	F
U+2B82x	𫠠	𫠡	𫠢	𫠣	𫠤	𫠥	𫠦	𫠧	𫠨	𫠩	𫠪	𫠫	𫠬	𫠭	𫠮	𫠯
U+2B83x	𫠰	𫠱	𫠲	𫠳	𫠴	𫠵	𫠶	𫠷	𫠸	𫠹	𫠺	𫠻	𫠼	𫠽	𫠾	𫠿
U+2B84x	𫡀	𫡁	𫡂	𫡃	𫡄	𫡅	𫡆	𫡇	𫡈	𫡉	𫡊	𫡋	𫡌	𫡍	𫡎	𫡏
U+2B85x	𫡐	𫡑	𫡒	𫡓	𫡔	𫡕	𫡖	𫡗	𫡘	𫡙	𫡚	𫡛	𫡜	𫡝	𫡞	𫡟
U+2B86x	𫡠	𫡡	𫡢	𫡣	𫡤	𫡥	𫡦	𫡧	𫡨	𫡩	𫡪	𫡫	𫡬	𫡭	𫡮	𫡯
U+2B87x	𫡰	𫡱	𫡲	𫡳	𫡴	𫡵	𫡶	𫡷	𫡸	𫡹	𫡺	𫡻	𫡼	𫡽	𫡾	𫡿
U+2B88x	𫢀	𫢁	𫢂	𫢃	𫢄	𫢅	𫢆	𫢇	𫢈	𫢉	𫢊	𫢋	𫢌	𫢍	𫢎	𫢏
U+2B89x	𫢐	𫢑	𫢒	𫢓	𫢔	𫢕	𫢖	𫢗	𫢘	𫢙	𫢚	𫢛	𫢜	𫢝	𫢞	𫢟
U+2B8Ax	𫢠	𫢡	𫢢	𫢣	𫢤	𫢥	𫢦	𫢧	𫢨	𫢩	𫢪	𫢫	𫢬	𫢭	𫢮	𫢯
U+2B8Bx	𫢰	𫢱	𫢲	𫢳	𫢴	𫢵	𫢶	𫢷	𫢸	𫢹	𫢺	𫢻	𫢼	𫢽	𫢾	𫢿
U+2B8Cx	𫣀	𫣁	𫣂	𫣃	𫣄	𫣅	𫣆	𫣇	𫣈	𫣉	𫣊	𫣋	𫣌	𫣍	𫣎	𫣏
U+2B8Dx	𫣐	𫣑	𫣒	𫣓	𫣔	𫣕	𫣖	𫣗	𫣘	𫣙	𫣚	𫣛	𫣜	𫣝	𫣞	𫣟
U+2B8Ex	𫣠	𫣡	𫣢	𫣣	𫣤	𫣥	𫣦	𫣧	𫣨	𫣩	𫣪	𫣫	𫣬	𫣭	𫣮	𫣯
U+2B8Fx	𫣰	𫣱	𫣲	𫣳	𫣴	𫣵	𫣶	𫣷	𫣸	𫣹	𫣺	𫣻	𫣼	𫣽	𫣾	𫣿
U+2B90x	𫤀	𫤁	𫤂	𫤃	𫤄	𫤅	𫤆	𫤇	𫤈	𫤉	𫤊	𫤋	𫤌	𫤍	𫤎	𫤏
U+2B91x	𫤐	𫤑	𫤒	𫤓	𫤔	𫤕	𫤖	𫤗	𫤘	𫤙	𫤚	𫤛	𫤜	𫤝	𫤞	𫤟
U+2B92x	𫤠	𫤡	𫤢	𫤣	𫤤	𫤥	𫤦	𫤧	𫤨	𫤩	𫤪	𫤫	𫤬	𫤭	𫤮	𫤯
U+2B93x	𫤰	𫤱	𫤲	𫤳	𫤴	𫤵	𫤶	𫤷	𫤸	𫤹	𫤺	𫤻	𫤼	𫤽	𫤾	𫤿
U+2B94x	𫥀	𫥁	𫥂	𫥃	𫥄	𫥅	𫥆	𫥇	𫥈	𫥉	𫥊	𫥋	𫥌	𫥍	𫥎	𫥏
U+2B95x	𫥐	𫥑	𫥒	𫥓	𫥔	𫥕	𫥖	𫥗	𫥘	𫥙	𫥚	𫥛	𫥜	𫥝	𫥞	𫥟
U+2B96x	𫥠	𫥡	𫥢	𫥣	𫥤	𫥥	𫥦	𫥧	𫥨	𫥩	𫥪	𫥫	𫥬	𫥭	𫥮	𫥯
U+2B97x	𫥰	𫥱	𫥲	𫥳	𫥴	𫥵	𫥶	𫥷	𫥸	𫥹	𫥺	𫥻	𫥼	𫥽	𫥾	𫥿
U+2B98x	𫦀	𫦁	𫦂	𫦃	𫦄	𫦅	𫦆	𫦇	𫦈	𫦉	𫦊	𫦋	𫦌	𫦍	𫦎	𫦏
U+2B99x	𫦐	𫦑	𫦒	𫦓	𫦔	𫦕	𫦖	𫦗	𫦘	𫦙	𫦚	𫦛	𫦜	𫦝	𫦞	𫦟
U+2B9Ax	𫦠	𫦡	𫦢	𫦣	𫦤	𫦥	𫦦	𫦧	𫦨	𫦩	𫦪	𫦫	𫦬	𫦭	𫦮	𫦯
U+2B9Bx	𫦰	𫦱	𫦲	𫦳	𫦴	𫦵	𫦶	𫦷	𫦸	𫦹	𫦺	𫦻	𫦼	𫦽	𫦾	𫦿
U+2B9Cx	𫧀	𫧁	𫧂	𫧃	𫧄	𫧅	𫧆	𫧇	𫧈	𫧉	𫧊	𫧋	𫧌	𫧍	𫧎	𫧏
U+2B9Dx	𫧐	𫧑	𫧒	𫧓	𫧔	𫧕	𫧖	𫧗	𫧘	𫧙	𫧚	𫧛	𫧜	𫧝	𫧞	𫧟
U+2B9Ex	𫧠	𫧡	𫧢	𫧣	𫧤	𫧥	𫧦	𫧧	𫧨	𫧩	𫧪	𫧫	𫧬	𫧭	𫧮	𫧯
U+2B9Fx	𫧰	𫧱	𫧲	𫧳	𫧴	𫧵	𫧶	𫧷	𫧸	𫧹	𫧺	𫧻	𫧼	𫧽	𫧾	𫧿
U+2BA0x	𫨀	𫨁	𫨂	𫨃	𫨄	𫨅	𫨆	𫨇	𫨈	𫨉	𫨊	𫨋	𫨌	𫨍	𫨎	𫨏
U+2BA1x	𫨐	𫨑	𫨒	𫨓	𫨔	𫨕	𫨖	𫨗	𫨘	𫨙	𫨚	𫨛	𫨜	𫨝	𫨞	𫨟
U+2BA2x	𫨠	𫨡	𫨢	𫨣	𫨤	𫨥	𫨦	𫨧	𫨨	𫨩	𫨪	𫨫	𫨬	𫨭	𫨮	𫨯
U+2BA3x	𫨰	𫨱	𫨲	𫨳	𫨴	𫨵	𫨶	𫨷	𫨸	𫨹	𫨺	𫨻	𫨼	𫨽	𫨾	𫨿
U+2BA4x	𫩀	𫩁	𫩂	𫩃	𫩄	𫩅	𫩆	𫩇	𫩈	𫩉	𫩊	𫩋	𫩌	𫩍	𫩎	𫩏
U+2BA5x	𫩐	𫩑	𫩒	𫩓	𫩔	𫩕	𫩖	𫩗	𫩘	𫩙	𫩚	𫩛	𫩜	𫩝	𫩞	𫩟
U+2BA6x	𫩠	𫩡	𫩢	𫩣	𫩤	𫩥	𫩦	𫩧	𫩨	𫩩	𫩪	𫩫	𫩬	𫩭	𫩮	𫩯
U+2BA7x	𫩰	𫩱	𫩲	𫩳	𫩴	𫩵	𫩶	𫩷	𫩸	𫩹	𫩺	𫩻	𫩼	𫩽	𫩾	𫩿
U+2BA8x	𫪀	𫪁	𫪂	𫪃	𫪄	𫪅	𫪆	𫪇	𫪈	𫪉	𫪊	𫪋	𫪌	𫪍	𫪎	𫪏
U+2BA9x	𫪐	𫪑	𫪒	𫪓	𫪔	𫪕	𫪖	𫪗	𫪘	𫪙	𫪚	𫪛	𫪜	𫪝	𫪞	𫪟
U+2BAAx	𫪠	𫪡	𫪢	𫪣	𫪤	𫪥	𫪦	𫪧	𫪨	𫪩	𫪪	𫪫	𫪬	𫪭	𫪮	𫪯
U+2BABx	𫪰	𫪱	𫪲	𫪳	𫪴	𫪵	𫪶	𫪷	𫪸	𫪹	𫪺	𫪻	𫪼	𫪽	𫪾	𫪿
U+2BACx	𫫀	𫫁	𫫂	𫫃	𫫄	𫫅	𫫆	𫫇	𫫈	𫫉	𫫊	𫫋	𫫌	𫫍	𫫎	𫫏
U+2BADx	𫫐	𫫑	𫫒	𫫓	𫫔	𫫕	𫫖	𫫗	𫫘	𫫙	𫫚	𫫛	𫫜	𫫝	𫫞	𫫟
U+2BAEx	𫫠	𫫡	𫫢	𫫣	𫫤	𫫥	𫫦	𫫧	𫫨	𫫩	𫫪	𫫫	𫫬	𫫭	𫫮	𫫯
U+2BAFx	𫫰	𫫱	𫫲	𫫳	𫫴	𫫵	𫫶	𫫷	𫫸	𫫹	𫫺	𫫻	𫫼	𫫽	𫫾	𫫿
U+2BB0x	𫬀	𫬁	𫬂	𫬃	𫬄	𫬅	𫬆	𫬇	𫬈	𫬉	𫬊	𫬋	𫬌	𫬍	𫬎	𫬏
U+2BB1x	𫬐	𫬑	𫬒	𫬓	𫬔	𫬕	𫬖	𫬗	𫬘	𫬙	𫬚	𫬛	𫬜	𫬝	𫬞	𫬟
U+2BB2x	𫬠	𫬡	𫬢	𫬣	𫬤	𫬥	𫬦	𫬧	𫬨	𫬩	𫬪	𫬫	𫬬	𫬭	𫬮	𫬯
U+2BB3x	𫬰	𫬱	𫬲	𫬳	𫬴	𫬵	𫬶	𫬷	𫬸	𫬹	𫬺	𫬻	𫬼	𫬽	𫬾	𫬿
U+2BB4x	𫭀	𫭁	𫭂	𫭃	𫭄	𫭅	𫭆	𫭇	𫭈	𫭉	𫭊	𫭋	𫭌	𫭍	𫭎	𫭏
U+2BB5x	𫭐	𫭑	𫭒	𫭓	𫭔	𫭕	𫭖	𫭗	𫭘	𫭙	𫭚	𫭛	𫭜	𫭝	𫭞	𫭟
U+2BB6x	𫭠	𫭡	𫭢	𫭣	𫭤	𫭥	𫭦	𫭧	𫭨	𫭩	𫭪	𫭫	𫭬	𫭭	𫭮	𫭯
U+2BB7x	𫭰	𫭱	𫭲	𫭳	𫭴	𫭵	𫭶	𫭷	𫭸	𫭹	𫭺	𫭻	𫭼	𫭽	𫭾	𫭿
U+2BB8x	𫮀	𫮁	𫮂	𫮃	𫮄	𫮅	𫮆	𫮇	𫮈	𫮉	𫮊	𫮋	𫮌	𫮍	𫮎	𫮏
U+2BB9x	𫮐	𫮑	𫮒	𫮓	𫮔	𫮕	𫮖	𫮗	𫮘	𫮙	𫮚	𫮛	𫮜	𫮝	𫮞	𫮟
U+2BBAx	𫮠	𫮡	𫮢	𫮣	𫮤	𫮥	𫮦	𫮧	𫮨	𫮩	𫮪	𫮫	𫮬	𫮭	𫮮	𫮯
U+2BBBx	𫮰	𫮱	𫮲	𫮳	𫮴	𫮵	𫮶	𫮷	𫮸	𫮹	𫮺	𫮻	𫮼	𫮽	𫮾	𫮿
U+2BBCx	𫯀	𫯁	𫯂	𫯃	𫯄	𫯅	𫯆	𫯇	𫯈	𫯉	𫯊	𫯋	𫯌	𫯍	𫯎	𫯏
U+2BBDx	𫯐	𫯑	𫯒	𫯓	𫯔	𫯕	𫯖	𫯗	𫯘	𫯙	𫯚	𫯛	𫯜	𫯝	𫯞	𫯟
U+2BBEx	𫯠	𫯡	𫯢	𫯣	𫯤	𫯥	𫯦	𫯧	𫯨	𫯩	𫯪	𫯫	𫯬	𫯭	𫯮	𫯯
U+2BBFx	𫯰	𫯱	𫯲	𫯳	𫯴	𫯵	𫯶	𫯷	𫯸	𫯹	𫯺	𫯻	𫯼	𫯽	𫯾	𫯿
U+2BC0x	𫰀	𫰁	𫰂	𫰃	𫰄	𫰅	𫰆	𫰇	𫰈	𫰉	𫰊	𫰋	𫰌	𫰍	𫰎	𫰏
U+2BC1x	𫰐	𫰑	𫰒	𫰓	𫰔	𫰕	𫰖	𫰗	𫰘	𫰙	𫰚	𫰛	𫰜	𫰝	𫰞	𫰟
U+2BC2x	𫰠	𫰡	𫰢	𫰣	𫰤	𫰥	𫰦	𫰧	𫰨	𫰩	𫰪	𫰫	𫰬	𫰭	𫰮	𫰯
U+2BC3x	𫰰	𫰱	𫰲	𫰳	𫰴	𫰵	𫰶	𫰷	𫰸	𫰹	𫰺	𫰻	𫰼	𫰽	𫰾	𫰿
U+2BC4x	𫱀	𫱁	𫱂	𫱃	𫱄	𫱅	𫱆	𫱇	𫱈	𫱉	𫱊	𫱋	𫱌	𫱍	𫱎	𫱏
U+2BC5x	𫱐	𫱑	𫱒	𫱓	𫱔	𫱕	𫱖	𫱗	𫱘	𫱙	𫱚	𫱛	𫱜	𫱝	𫱞	𫱟
U+2BC6x	𫱠	𫱡	𫱢	𫱣	𫱤	𫱥	𫱦	𫱧	𫱨	𫱩	𫱪	𫱫	𫱬	𫱭	𫱮	𫱯
U+2BC7x	𫱰	𫱱	𫱲	𫱳	𫱴	𫱵	𫱶	𫱷	𫱸	𫱹	𫱺	𫱻	𫱼	𫱽	𫱾	𫱿
U+2BC8x	𫲀	𫲁	𫲂	𫲃	𫲄	𫲅	𫲆	𫲇	𫲈	𫲉	𫲊	𫲋	𫲌	𫲍	𫲎	𫲏
U+2BC9x	𫲐	𫲑	𫲒	𫲓	𫲔	𫲕	𫲖	𫲗	𫲘	𫲙	𫲚	𫲛	𫲜	𫲝	𫲞	𫲟
U+2BCAx	𫲠	𫲡	𫲢	𫲣	𫲤	𫲥	𫲦	𫲧	𫲨	𫲩	𫲪	𫲫	𫲬	𫲭	𫲮	𫲯
U+2BCBx	𫲰	𫲱	𫲲	𫲳	𫲴	𫲵	𫲶	𫲷	𫲸	𫲹	𫲺	𫲻	𫲼	𫲽	𫲾	𫲿
U+2BCCx	𫳀	𫳁	𫳂	𫳃	𫳄	𫳅	𫳆	𫳇	𫳈	𫳉	𫳊	𫳋	𫳌	𫳍	𫳎	𫳏
U+2BCDx	𫳐	𫳑	𫳒	𫳓	𫳔	𫳕	𫳖	𫳗	𫳘	𫳙	𫳚	𫳛	𫳜	𫳝	𫳞	𫳟
U+2BCEx	𫳠	𫳡	𫳢	𫳣	𫳤	𫳥	𫳦	𫳧	𫳨	𫳩	𫳪	𫳫	𫳬	𫳭	𫳮	𫳯
U+2BCFx	𫳰	𫳱	𫳲	𫳳	𫳴	𫳵	𫳶	𫳷	𫳸	𫳹	𫳺	𫳻	𫳼	𫳽	𫳾	𫳿
U+2BD0x	𫴀	𫴁	𫴂	𫴃	𫴄	𫴅	𫴆	𫴇	𫴈	𫴉	𫴊	𫴋	𫴌	𫴍	𫴎	𫴏
U+2BD1x	𫴐	𫴑	𫴒	𫴓	𫴔	𫴕	𫴖	𫴗	𫴘	𫴙	𫴚	𫴛	𫴜	𫴝	𫴞	𫴟
U+2BD2x	𫴠	𫴡	𫴢	𫴣	𫴤	𫴥	𫴦	𫴧	𫴨	𫴩	𫴪	𫴫	𫴬	𫴭	𫴮	𫴯
U+2BD3x	𫴰	𫴱	𫴲	𫴳	𫴴	𫴵	𫴶	𫴷	𫴸	𫴹	𫴺	𫴻	𫴼	𫴽	𫴾	𫴿
U+2BD4x	𫵀	𫵁	𫵂	𫵃	𫵄	𫵅	𫵆	𫵇	𫵈	𫵉	𫵊	𫵋	𫵌	𫵍	𫵎	𫵏
U+2BD5x	𫵐	𫵑	𫵒	𫵓	𫵔	𫵕	𫵖	𫵗	𫵘	𫵙	𫵚	𫵛	𫵜	𫵝	𫵞	𫵟
U+2BD6x	𫵠	𫵡	𫵢	𫵣	𫵤	𫵥	𫵦	𫵧	𫵨	𫵩	𫵪	𫵫	𫵬	𫵭	𫵮	𫵯
U+2BD7x	𫵰	𫵱	𫵲	𫵳	𫵴	𫵵	𫵶	𫵷	𫵸	𫵹	𫵺	𫵻	𫵼	𫵽	𫵾	𫵿
U+2BD8x	𫶀	𫶁	𫶂	𫶃	𫶄	𫶅	𫶆	𫶇	𫶈	𫶉	𫶊	𫶋	𫶌	𫶍	𫶎	𫶏
U+2BD9x	𫶐	𫶑	𫶒	𫶓	𫶔	𫶕	𫶖	𫶗	𫶘	𫶙	𫶚	𫶛	𫶜	𫶝	𫶞	𫶟
U+2BDAx	𫶠	𫶡	𫶢	𫶣	𫶤	𫶥	𫶦	𫶧	𫶨	𫶩	𫶪	𫶫	𫶬	𫶭	𫶮	𫶯
U+2BDBx	𫶰	𫶱	𫶲	𫶳	𫶴	𫶵	𫶶	𫶷	𫶸	𫶹	𫶺	𫶻	𫶼	𫶽	𫶾	𫶿
U+2BDCx	𫷀	𫷁	𫷂	𫷃	𫷄	𫷅	𫷆	𫷇	𫷈	𫷉	𫷊	𫷋	𫷌	𫷍	𫷎	𫷏
U+2BDDx	𫷐	𫷑	𫷒	𫷓	𫷔	𫷕	𫷖	𫷗	𫷘	𫷙	𫷚	𫷛	𫷜	𫷝	𫷞	𫷟
U+2BDEx	𫷠	𫷡	𫷢	𫷣	𫷤	𫷥	𫷦	𫷧	𫷨	𫷩	𫷪	𫷫	𫷬	𫷭	𫷮	𫷯
U+2BDFx	𫷰	𫷱	𫷲	𫷳	𫷴	𫷵	𫷶	𫷷	𫷸	𫷹	𫷺	𫷻	𫷼	𫷽	𫷾	𫷿
U+2BE0x	𫸀	𫸁	𫸂	𫸃	𫸄	𫸅	𫸆	𫸇	𫸈	𫸉	𫸊	𫸋	𫸌	𫸍	𫸎	𫸏
U+2BE1x	𫸐	𫸑	𫸒	𫸓	𫸔	𫸕	𫸖	𫸗	𫸘	𫸙	𫸚	𫸛	𫸜	𫸝	𫸞	𫸟
U+2BE2x	𫸠	𫸡	𫸢	𫸣	𫸤	𫸥	𫸦	𫸧	𫸨	𫸩	𫸪	𫸫	𫸬	𫸭	𫸮	𫸯
U+2BE3x	𫸰	𫸱	𫸲	𫸳	𫸴	𫸵	𫸶	𫸷	𫸸	𫸹	𫸺	𫸻	𫸼	𫸽	𫸾	𫸿
U+2BE4x	𫹀	𫹁	𫹂	𫹃	𫹄	𫹅	𫹆	𫹇	𫹈	𫹉	𫹊	𫹋	𫹌	𫹍	𫹎	𫹏
U+2BE5x	𫹐	𫹑	𫹒	𫹓	𫹔	𫹕	𫹖	𫹗	𫹘	𫹙	𫹚	𫹛	𫹜	𫹝	𫹞	𫹟
U+2BE6x	𫹠	𫹡	𫹢	𫹣	𫹤	𫹥	𫹦	𫹧	𫹨	𫹩	𫹪	𫹫	𫹬	𫹭	𫹮	𫹯
U+2BE7x	𫹰	𫹱	𫹲	𫹳	𫹴	𫹵	𫹶	𫹷	𫹸	𫹹	𫹺	𫹻	𫹼	𫹽	𫹾	𫹿
U+2BE8x	𫺀	𫺁	𫺂	𫺃	𫺄	𫺅	𫺆	𫺇	𫺈	𫺉	𫺊	𫺋	𫺌	𫺍	𫺎	𫺏
U+2BE9x	𫺐	𫺑	𫺒	𫺓	𫺔	𫺕	𫺖	𫺗	𫺘	𫺙	𫺚	𫺛	𫺜	𫺝	𫺞	𫺟
U+2BEAx	𫺠	𫺡	𫺢	𫺣	𫺤	𫺥	𫺦	𫺧	𫺨	𫺩	𫺪	𫺫	𫺬	𫺭	𫺮	𫺯
U+2BEBx	𫺰	𫺱	𫺲	𫺳	𫺴	𫺵	𫺶	𫺷	𫺸	𫺹	𫺺	𫺻	𫺼	𫺽	𫺾	𫺿
U+2BECx	𫻀	𫻁	𫻂	𫻃	𫻄	𫻅	𫻆	𫻇	𫻈	𫻉	𫻊	𫻋	𫻌	𫻍	𫻎	𫻏
U+2BEDx	𫻐	𫻑	𫻒	𫻓	𫻔	𫻕	𫻖	𫻗	𫻘	𫻙	𫻚	𫻛	𫻜	𫻝	𫻞	𫻟
U+2BEEx	𫻠	𫻡	𫻢	𫻣	𫻤	𫻥	𫻦	𫻧	𫻨	𫻩	𫻪	𫻫	𫻬	𫻭	𫻮	𫻯
U+2BEFx	𫻰	𫻱	𫻲	𫻳	𫻴	𫻵	𫻶	𫻷	𫻸	𫻹	𫻺	𫻻	𫻼	𫻽	𫻾	𫻿
U+2BF0x	𫼀	𫼁	𫼂	𫼃	𫼄	𫼅	𫼆	𫼇	𫼈	𫼉	𫼊	𫼋	𫼌	𫼍	𫼎	𫼏
U+2BF1x	𫼐	𫼑	𫼒	𫼓	𫼔	𫼕	𫼖	𫼗	𫼘	𫼙	𫼚	𫼛	𫼜	𫼝	𫼞	𫼟
U+2BF2x	𫼠	𫼡	𫼢	𫼣	𫼤	𫼥	𫼦	𫼧	𫼨	𫼩	𫼪	𫼫	𫼬	𫼭	𫼮	𫼯
U+2BF3x	𫼰	𫼱	𫼲	𫼳	𫼴	𫼵	𫼶	𫼷	𫼸	𫼹	𫼺	𫼻	𫼼	𫼽	𫼾	𫼿
U+2BF4x	𫽀	𫽁	𫽂	𫽃	𫽄	𫽅	𫽆	𫽇	𫽈	𫽉	𫽊	𫽋	𫽌	𫽍	𫽎	𫽏
U+2BF5x	𫽐	𫽑	𫽒	𫽓	𫽔	𫽕	𫽖	𫽗	𫽘	𫽙	𫽚	𫽛	𫽜	𫽝	𫽞	𫽟
U+2BF6x	𫽠	𫽡	𫽢	𫽣	𫽤	𫽥	𫽦	𫽧	𫽨	𫽩	𫽪	𫽫	𫽬	𫽭	𫽮	𫽯
U+2BF7x	𫽰	𫽱	𫽲	𫽳	𫽴	𫽵	𫽶	𫽷	𫽸	𫽹	𫽺	𫽻	𫽼	𫽽	𫽾	𫽿
U+2BF8x	𫾀	𫾁	𫾂	𫾃	𫾄	𫾅	𫾆	𫾇	𫾈	𫾉	𫾊	𫾋	𫾌	𫾍	𫾎	𫾏
U+2BF9x	𫾐	𫾑	𫾒	𫾓	𫾔	𫾕	𫾖	𫾗	𫾘	𫾙	𫾚	𫾛	𫾜	𫾝	𫾞	𫾟
U+2BFAx	𫾠	𫾡	𫾢	𫾣	𫾤	𫾥	𫾦	𫾧	𫾨	𫾩	𫾪	𫾫	𫾬	𫾭	𫾮	𫾯
U+2BFBx	𫾰	𫾱	𫾲	𫾳	𫾴	𫾵	𫾶	𫾷	𫾸	𫾹	𫾺	𫾻	𫾼	𫾽	𫾾	𫾿
U+2BFCx	𫿀	𫿁	𫿂	𫿃	𫿄	𫿅	𫿆	𫿇	𫿈	𫿉	𫿊	𫿋	𫿌	𫿍	𫿎	𫿏
U+2BFDx	𫿐	𫿑	𫿒	𫿓	𫿔	𫿕	𫿖	𫿗	𫿘	𫿙	𫿚	𫿛	𫿜	𫿝	𫿞	𫿟
U+2BFEx	𫿠	𫿡	𫿢	𫿣	𫿤	𫿥	𫿦	𫿧	𫿨	𫿩	𫿪	𫿫	𫿬	𫿭	𫿮	𫿯
U+2BFFx	𫿰	𫿱	𫿲	𫿳	𫿴	𫿵	𫿶	𫿷	𫿸	𫿹	𫿺	𫿻	𫿼	𫿽	𫿾	𫿿
U+2C00x	𬀀	𬀁	𬀂	𬀃	𬀄	𬀅	𬀆	𬀇	𬀈	𬀉	𬀊	𬀋	𬀌	𬀍	𬀎	𬀏
U+2C01x	𬀐	𬀑	𬀒	𬀓	𬀔	𬀕	𬀖	𬀗	𬀘	𬀙	𬀚	𬀛	𬀜	𬀝	𬀞	𬀟
U+2C02x	𬀠	𬀡	𬀢	𬀣	𬀤	𬀥	𬀦	𬀧	𬀨	𬀩	𬀪	𬀫	𬀬	𬀭	𬀮	𬀯
U+2C03x	𬀰	𬀱	𬀲	𬀳	𬀴	𬀵	𬀶	𬀷	𬀸	𬀹	𬀺	𬀻	𬀼	𬀽	𬀾	𬀿
U+2C04x	𬁀	𬁁	𬁂	𬁃	𬁄	𬁅	𬁆	𬁇	𬁈	𬁉	𬁊	𬁋	𬁌	𬁍	𬁎	𬁏
U+2C05x	𬁐	𬁑	𬁒	𬁓	𬁔	𬁕	𬁖	𬁗	𬁘	𬁙	𬁚	𬁛	𬁜	𬁝	𬁞	𬁟
U+2C06x	𬁠	𬁡	𬁢	𬁣	𬁤	𬁥	𬁦	𬁧	𬁨	𬁩	𬁪	𬁫	𬁬	𬁭	𬁮	𬁯
U+2C07x	𬁰	𬁱	𬁲	𬁳	𬁴	𬁵	𬁶	𬁷	𬁸	𬁹	𬁺	𬁻	𬁼	𬁽	𬁾	𬁿
U+2C08x	𬂀	𬂁	𬂂	𬂃	𬂄	𬂅	𬂆	𬂇	𬂈	𬂉	𬂊	𬂋	𬂌	𬂍	𬂎	𬂏
U+2C09x	𬂐	𬂑	𬂒	𬂓	𬂔	𬂕	𬂖	𬂗	𬂘	𬂙	𬂚	𬂛	𬂜	𬂝	𬂞	𬂟
U+2C0Ax	𬂠	𬂡	𬂢	𬂣	𬂤	𬂥	𬂦	𬂧	𬂨	𬂩	𬂪	𬂫	𬂬	𬂭	𬂮	𬂯
U+2C0Bx	𬂰	𬂱	𬂲	𬂳	𬂴	𬂵	𬂶	𬂷	𬂸	𬂹	𬂺	𬂻	𬂼	𬂽	𬂾	𬂿
U+2C0Cx	𬃀	𬃁	𬃂	𬃃	𬃄	𬃅	𬃆	𬃇	𬃈	𬃉	𬃊	𬃋	𬃌	𬃍	𬃎	𬃏
U+2C0Dx	𬃐	𬃑	𬃒	𬃓	𬃔	𬃕	𬃖	𬃗	𬃘	𬃙	𬃚	𬃛	𬃜	𬃝	𬃞	𬃟
U+2C0Ex	𬃠	𬃡	𬃢	𬃣	𬃤	𬃥	𬃦	𬃧	𬃨	𬃩	𬃪	𬃫	𬃬	𬃭	𬃮	𬃯
U+2C0Fx	𬃰	𬃱	𬃲	𬃳	𬃴	𬃵	𬃶	𬃷	𬃸	𬃹	𬃺	𬃻	𬃼	𬃽	𬃾	𬃿
U+2C10x	𬄀	𬄁	𬄂	𬄃	𬄄	𬄅	𬄆	𬄇	𬄈	𬄉	𬄊	𬄋	𬄌	𬄍	𬄎	𬄏
U+2C11x	𬄐	𬄑	𬄒	𬄓	𬄔	𬄕	𬄖	𬄗	𬄘	𬄙	𬄚	𬄛	𬄜	𬄝	𬄞	𬄟
U+2C12x	𬄠	𬄡	𬄢	𬄣	𬄤	𬄥	𬄦	𬄧	𬄨	𬄩	𬄪	𬄫	𬄬	𬄭	𬄮	𬄯
U+2C13x	𬄰	𬄱	𬄲	𬄳	𬄴	𬄵	𬄶	𬄷	𬄸	𬄹	𬄺	𬄻	𬄼	𬄽	𬄾	𬄿
U+2C14x	𬅀	𬅁	𬅂	𬅃	𬅄	𬅅	𬅆	𬅇	𬅈	𬅉	𬅊	𬅋	𬅌	𬅍	𬅎	𬅏
U+2C15x	𬅐	𬅑	𬅒	𬅓	𬅔	𬅕	𬅖	𬅗	𬅘	𬅙	𬅚	𬅛	𬅜	𬅝	𬅞	𬅟
U+2C16x	𬅠	𬅡	𬅢	𬅣	𬅤	𬅥	𬅦	𬅧	𬅨	𬅩	𬅪	𬅫	𬅬	𬅭	𬅮	𬅯
U+2C17x	𬅰	𬅱	𬅲	𬅳	𬅴	𬅵	𬅶	𬅷	𬅸	𬅹	𬅺	𬅻	𬅼	𬅽	𬅾	𬅿
U+2C18x	𬆀	𬆁	𬆂	𬆃	𬆄	𬆅	𬆆	𬆇	𬆈	𬆉	𬆊	𬆋	𬆌	𬆍	𬆎	𬆏
U+2C19x	𬆐	𬆑	𬆒	𬆓	𬆔	𬆕	𬆖	𬆗	𬆘	𬆙	𬆚	𬆛	𬆜	𬆝	𬆞	𬆟
U+2C1Ax	𬆠	𬆡	𬆢	𬆣	𬆤	𬆥	𬆦	𬆧	𬆨	𬆩	𬆪	𬆫	𬆬	𬆭	𬆮	𬆯
U+2C1Bx	𬆰	𬆱	𬆲	𬆳	𬆴	𬆵	𬆶	𬆷	𬆸	𬆹	𬆺	𬆻	𬆼	𬆽	𬆾	𬆿
U+2C1Cx	𬇀	𬇁	𬇂	𬇃	𬇄	𬇅	𬇆	𬇇	𬇈	𬇉	𬇊	𬇋	𬇌	𬇍	𬇎	𬇏
U+2C1Dx	𬇐	𬇑	𬇒	𬇓	𬇔	𬇕	𬇖	𬇗	𬇘	𬇙	𬇚	𬇛	𬇜	𬇝	𬇞	𬇟
U+2C1Ex	𬇠	𬇡	𬇢	𬇣	𬇤	𬇥	𬇦	𬇧	𬇨	𬇩	𬇪	𬇫	𬇬	𬇭	𬇮	𬇯
U+2C1Fx	𬇰	𬇱	𬇲	𬇳	𬇴	𬇵	𬇶	𬇷	𬇸	𬇹	𬇺	𬇻	𬇼	𬇽	𬇾	𬇿
U+2C20x	𬈀	𬈁	𬈂	𬈃	𬈄	𬈅	𬈆	𬈇	𬈈	𬈉	𬈊	𬈋	𬈌	𬈍	𬈎	𬈏
U+2C21x	𬈐	𬈑	𬈒	𬈓	𬈔	𬈕	𬈖	𬈗	𬈘	𬈙	𬈚	𬈛	𬈜	𬈝	𬈞	𬈟
U+2C22x	𬈠	𬈡	𬈢	𬈣	𬈤	𬈥	𬈦	𬈧	𬈨	𬈩	𬈪	𬈫	𬈬	𬈭	𬈮	𬈯
U+2C23x	𬈰	𬈱	𬈲	𬈳	𬈴	𬈵	𬈶	𬈷	𬈸	𬈹	𬈺	𬈻	𬈼	𬈽	𬈾	𬈿
U+2C24x	𬉀	𬉁	𬉂	𬉃	𬉄	𬉅	𬉆	𬉇	𬉈	𬉉	𬉊	𬉋	𬉌	𬉍	𬉎	𬉏
U+2C25x	𬉐	𬉑	𬉒	𬉓	𬉔	𬉕	𬉖	𬉗	𬉘	𬉙	𬉚	𬉛	𬉜	𬉝	𬉞	𬉟
U+2C26x	𬉠	𬉡	𬉢	𬉣	𬉤	𬉥	𬉦	𬉧	𬉨	𬉩	𬉪	𬉫	𬉬	𬉭	𬉮	𬉯
U+2C27x	𬉰	𬉱	𬉲	𬉳	𬉴	𬉵	𬉶	𬉷	𬉸	𬉹	𬉺	𬉻	𬉼	𬉽	𬉾	𬉿
U+2C28x	𬊀	𬊁	𬊂	𬊃	𬊄	𬊅	𬊆	𬊇	𬊈	𬊉	𬊊	𬊋	𬊌	𬊍	𬊎	𬊏
U+2C29x	𬊐	𬊑	𬊒	𬊓	𬊔	𬊕	𬊖	𬊗	𬊘	𬊙	𬊚	𬊛	𬊜	𬊝	𬊞	𬊟
U+2C2Ax	𬊠	𬊡	𬊢	𬊣	𬊤	𬊥	𬊦	𬊧	𬊨	𬊩	𬊪	𬊫	𬊬	𬊭	𬊮	𬊯
U+2C2Bx	𬊰	𬊱	𬊲	𬊳	𬊴	𬊵	𬊶	𬊷	𬊸	𬊹	𬊺	𬊻	𬊼	𬊽	𬊾	𬊿
U+2C2Cx	𬋀	𬋁	𬋂	𬋃	𬋄	𬋅	𬋆	𬋇	𬋈	𬋉	𬋊	𬋋	𬋌	𬋍	𬋎	𬋏
U+2C2Dx	𬋐	𬋑	𬋒	𬋓	𬋔	𬋕	𬋖	𬋗	𬋘	𬋙	𬋚	𬋛	𬋜	𬋝	𬋞	𬋟
U+2C2Ex	𬋠	𬋡	𬋢	𬋣	𬋤	𬋥	𬋦	𬋧	𬋨	𬋩	𬋪	𬋫	𬋬	𬋭	𬋮	𬋯
U+2C2Fx	𬋰	𬋱	𬋲	𬋳	𬋴	𬋵	𬋶	𬋷	𬋸	𬋹	𬋺	𬋻	𬋼	𬋽	𬋾	𬋿
U+2C30x	𬌀	𬌁	𬌂	𬌃	𬌄	𬌅	𬌆	𬌇	𬌈	𬌉	𬌊	𬌋	𬌌	𬌍	𬌎	𬌏
U+2C31x	𬌐	𬌑	𬌒	𬌓	𬌔	𬌕	𬌖	𬌗	𬌘	𬌙	𬌚	𬌛	𬌜	𬌝	𬌞	𬌟
U+2C32x	𬌠	𬌡	𬌢	𬌣	𬌤	𬌥	𬌦	𬌧	𬌨	𬌩	𬌪	𬌫	𬌬	𬌭	𬌮	𬌯
U+2C33x	𬌰	𬌱	𬌲	𬌳	𬌴	𬌵	𬌶	𬌷	𬌸	𬌹	𬌺	𬌻	𬌼	𬌽	𬌾	𬌿
U+2C34x	𬍀	𬍁	𬍂	𬍃	𬍄	𬍅	𬍆	𬍇	𬍈	𬍉	𬍊	𬍋	𬍌	𬍍	𬍎	𬍏
U+2C35x	𬍐	𬍑	𬍒	𬍓	𬍔	𬍕	𬍖	𬍗	𬍘	𬍙	𬍚	𬍛	𬍜	𬍝	𬍞	𬍟
U+2C36x	𬍠	𬍡	𬍢	𬍣	𬍤	𬍥	𬍦	𬍧	𬍨	𬍩	𬍪	𬍫	𬍬	𬍭	𬍮	𬍯
U+2C37x	𬍰	𬍱	𬍲	𬍳	𬍴	𬍵	𬍶	𬍷	𬍸	𬍹	𬍺	𬍻	𬍼	𬍽	𬍾	𬍿
U+2C38x	𬎀	𬎁	𬎂	𬎃	𬎄	𬎅	𬎆	𬎇	𬎈	𬎉	𬎊	𬎋	𬎌	𬎍	𬎎	𬎏
U+2C39x	𬎐	𬎑	𬎒	𬎓	𬎔	𬎕	𬎖	𬎗	𬎘	𬎙	𬎚	𬎛	𬎜	𬎝	𬎞	𬎟
U+2C3Ax	𬎠	𬎡	𬎢	𬎣	𬎤	𬎥	𬎦	𬎧	𬎨	𬎩	𬎪	𬎫	𬎬	𬎭	𬎮	𬎯
U+2C3Bx	𬎰	𬎱	𬎲	𬎳	𬎴	𬎵	𬎶	𬎷	𬎸	𬎹	𬎺	𬎻	𬎼	𬎽	𬎾	𬎿
U+2C3Cx	𬏀	𬏁	𬏂	𬏃	𬏄	𬏅	𬏆	𬏇	𬏈	𬏉	𬏊	𬏋	𬏌	𬏍	𬏎	𬏏
U+2C3Dx	𬏐	𬏑	𬏒	𬏓	𬏔	𬏕	𬏖	𬏗	𬏘	𬏙	𬏚	𬏛	𬏜	𬏝	𬏞	𬏟
U+2C3Ex	𬏠	𬏡	𬏢	𬏣	𬏤	𬏥	𬏦	𬏧	𬏨	𬏩	𬏪	𬏫	𬏬	𬏭	𬏮	𬏯
U+2C3Fx	𬏰	𬏱	𬏲	𬏳	𬏴	𬏵	𬏶	𬏷	𬏸	𬏹	𬏺	𬏻	𬏼	𬏽	𬏾	𬏿
U+2C40x	𬐀	𬐁	𬐂	𬐃	𬐄	𬐅	𬐆	𬐇	𬐈	𬐉	𬐊	𬐋	𬐌	𬐍	𬐎	𬐏
U+2C41x	𬐐	𬐑	𬐒	𬐓	𬐔	𬐕	𬐖	𬐗	𬐘	𬐙	𬐚	𬐛	𬐜	𬐝	𬐞	𬐟
U+2C42x	𬐠	𬐡	𬐢	𬐣	𬐤	𬐥	𬐦	𬐧	𬐨	𬐩	𬐪	𬐫	𬐬	𬐭	𬐮	𬐯
U+2C43x	𬐰	𬐱	𬐲	𬐳	𬐴	𬐵	𬐶	𬐷	𬐸	𬐹	𬐺	𬐻	𬐼	𬐽	𬐾	𬐿
U+2C44x	𬑀	𬑁	𬑂	𬑃	𬑄	𬑅	𬑆	𬑇	𬑈	𬑉	𬑊	𬑋	𬑌	𬑍	𬑎	𬑏
U+2C45x	𬑐	𬑑	𬑒	𬑓	𬑔	𬑕	𬑖	𬑗	𬑘	𬑙	𬑚	𬑛	𬑜	𬑝	𬑞	𬑟
U+2C46x	𬑠	𬑡	𬑢	𬑣	𬑤	𬑥	𬑦	𬑧	𬑨	𬑩	𬑪	𬑫	𬑬	𬑭	𬑮	𬑯
U+2C47x	𬑰	𬑱	𬑲	𬑳	𬑴	𬑵	𬑶	𬑷	𬑸	𬑹	𬑺	𬑻	𬑼	𬑽	𬑾	𬑿
U+2C48x	𬒀	𬒁	𬒂	𬒃	𬒄	𬒅	𬒆	𬒇	𬒈	𬒉	𬒊	𬒋	𬒌	𬒍	𬒎	𬒏
U+2C49x	𬒐	𬒑	𬒒	𬒓	𬒔	𬒕	𬒖	𬒗	𬒘	𬒙	𬒚	𬒛	𬒜	𬒝	𬒞	𬒟
U+2C4Ax	𬒠	𬒡	𬒢	𬒣	𬒤	𬒥	𬒦	𬒧	𬒨	𬒩	𬒪	𬒫	𬒬	𬒭	𬒮	𬒯
U+2C4Bx	𬒰	𬒱	𬒲	𬒳	𬒴	𬒵	𬒶	𬒷	𬒸	𬒹	𬒺	𬒻	𬒼	𬒽	𬒾	𬒿
U+2C4Cx	𬓀	𬓁	𬓂	𬓃	𬓄	𬓅	𬓆	𬓇	𬓈	𬓉	𬓊	𬓋	𬓌	𬓍	𬓎	𬓏
U+2C4Dx	𬓐	𬓑	𬓒	𬓓	𬓔	𬓕	𬓖	𬓗	𬓘	𬓙	𬓚	𬓛	𬓜	𬓝	𬓞	𬓟
U+2C4Ex	𬓠	𬓡	𬓢	𬓣	𬓤	𬓥	𬓦	𬓧	𬓨	𬓩	𬓪	𬓫	𬓬	𬓭	𬓮	𬓯
U+2C4Fx	𬓰	𬓱	𬓲	𬓳	𬓴	𬓵	𬓶	𬓷	𬓸	𬓹	𬓺	𬓻	𬓼	𬓽	𬓾	𬓿
U+2C50x	𬔀	𬔁	𬔂	𬔃	𬔄	𬔅	𬔆	𬔇	𬔈	𬔉	𬔊	𬔋	𬔌	𬔍	𬔎	𬔏
U+2C51x	𬔐	𬔑	𬔒	𬔓	𬔔	𬔕	𬔖	𬔗	𬔘	𬔙	𬔚	𬔛	𬔜	𬔝	𬔞	𬔟
U+2C52x	𬔠	𬔡	𬔢	𬔣	𬔤	𬔥	𬔦	𬔧	𬔨	𬔩	𬔪	𬔫	𬔬	𬔭	𬔮	𬔯
U+2C53x	𬔰	𬔱	𬔲	𬔳	𬔴	𬔵	𬔶	𬔷	𬔸	𬔹	𬔺	𬔻	𬔼	𬔽	𬔾	𬔿
U+2C54x	𬕀	𬕁	𬕂	𬕃	𬕄	𬕅	𬕆	𬕇	𬕈	𬕉	𬕊	𬕋	𬕌	𬕍	𬕎	𬕏
U+2C55x	𬕐	𬕑	𬕒	𬕓	𬕔	𬕕	𬕖	𬕗	𬕘	𬕙	𬕚	𬕛	𬕜	𬕝	𬕞	𬕟
U+2C56x	𬕠	𬕡	𬕢	𬕣	𬕤	𬕥	𬕦	𬕧	𬕨	𬕩	𬕪	𬕫	𬕬	𬕭	𬕮	𬕯
U+2C57x	𬕰	𬕱	𬕲	𬕳	𬕴	𬕵	𬕶	𬕷	𬕸	𬕹	𬕺	𬕻	𬕼	𬕽	𬕾	𬕿
U+2C58x	𬖀	𬖁	𬖂	𬖃	𬖄	𬖅	𬖆	𬖇	𬖈	𬖉	𬖊	𬖋	𬖌	𬖍	𬖎	𬖏
U+2C59x	𬖐	𬖑	𬖒	𬖓	𬖔	𬖕	𬖖	𬖗	𬖘	𬖙	𬖚	𬖛	𬖜	𬖝	𬖞	𬖟
U+2C5Ax	𬖠	𬖡	𬖢	𬖣	𬖤	𬖥	𬖦	𬖧	𬖨	𬖩	𬖪	𬖫	𬖬	𬖭	𬖮	𬖯
U+2C5Bx	𬖰	𬖱	𬖲	𬖳	𬖴	𬖵	𬖶	𬖷	𬖸	𬖹	𬖺	𬖻	𬖼	𬖽	𬖾	𬖿
U+2C5Cx	𬗀	𬗁	𬗂	𬗃	𬗄	𬗅	𬗆	𬗇	𬗈	𬗉	𬗊	𬗋	𬗌	𬗍	𬗎	𬗏
U+2C5Dx	𬗐	𬗑	𬗒	𬗓	𬗔	𬗕	𬗖	𬗗	𬗘	𬗙	𬗚	𬗛	𬗜	𬗝	𬗞	𬗟
U+2C5Ex	𬗠	𬗡	𬗢	𬗣	𬗤	𬗥	𬗦	𬗧	𬗨	𬗩	𬗪	𬗫	𬗬	𬗭	𬗮	𬗯
U+2C5Fx	𬗰	𬗱	𬗲	𬗳	𬗴	𬗵	𬗶	𬗷	𬗸	𬗹	𬗺	𬗻	𬗼	𬗽	𬗾	𬗿
U+2C60x	𬘀	𬘁	𬘂	𬘃	𬘄	𬘅	𬘆	𬘇	𬘈	𬘉	𬘊	𬘋	𬘌	𬘍	𬘎	𬘏
U+2C61x	𬘐	𬘑	𬘒	𬘓	𬘔	𬘕	𬘖	𬘗	𬘘	𬘙	𬘚	𬘛	𬘜	𬘝	𬘞	𬘟
U+2C62x	𬘠	𬘡	𬘢	𬘣	𬘤	𬘥	𬘦	𬘧	𬘨	𬘩	𬘪	𬘫	𬘬	𬘭	𬘮	𬘯
U+2C63x	𬘰	𬘱	𬘲	𬘳	𬘴	𬘵	𬘶	𬘷	𬘸	𬘹	𬘺	𬘻	𬘼	𬘽	𬘾	𬘿
U+2C64x	𬙀	𬙁	𬙂	𬙃	𬙄	𬙅	𬙆	𬙇	𬙈	𬙉	𬙊	𬙋	𬙌	𬙍	𬙎	𬙏
U+2C65x	𬙐	𬙑	𬙒	𬙓	𬙔	𬙕	𬙖	𬙗	𬙘	𬙙	𬙚	𬙛	𬙜	𬙝	𬙞	𬙟
U+2C66x	𬙠	𬙡	𬙢	𬙣	𬙤	𬙥	𬙦	𬙧	𬙨	𬙩	𬙪	𬙫	𬙬	𬙭	𬙮	𬙯
U+2C67x	𬙰	𬙱	𬙲	𬙳	𬙴	𬙵	𬙶	𬙷	𬙸	𬙹	𬙺	𬙻	𬙼	𬙽	𬙾	𬙿
U+2C68x	𬚀	𬚁	𬚂	𬚃	𬚄	𬚅	𬚆	𬚇	𬚈	𬚉	𬚊	𬚋	𬚌	𬚍	𬚎	𬚏
U+2C69x	𬚐	𬚑	𬚒	𬚓	𬚔	𬚕	𬚖	𬚗	𬚘	𬚙	𬚚	𬚛	𬚜	𬚝	𬚞	𬚟
U+2C6Ax	𬚠	𬚡	𬚢	𬚣	𬚤	𬚥	𬚦	𬚧	𬚨	𬚩	𬚪	𬚫	𬚬	𬚭	𬚮	𬚯
U+2C6Bx	𬚰	𬚱	𬚲	𬚳	𬚴	𬚵	𬚶	𬚷	𬚸	𬚹	𬚺	𬚻	𬚼	𬚽	𬚾	𬚿
U+2C6Cx	𬛀	𬛁	𬛂	𬛃	𬛄	𬛅	𬛆	𬛇	𬛈	𬛉	𬛊	𬛋	𬛌	𬛍	𬛎	𬛏
U+2C6Dx	𬛐	𬛑	𬛒	𬛓	𬛔	𬛕	𬛖	𬛗	𬛘	𬛙	𬛚	𬛛	𬛜	𬛝	𬛞	𬛟
U+2C6Ex	𬛠	𬛡	𬛢	𬛣	𬛤	𬛥	𬛦	𬛧	𬛨	𬛩	𬛪	𬛫	𬛬	𬛭	𬛮	𬛯
U+2C6Fx	𬛰	𬛱	𬛲	𬛳	𬛴	𬛵	𬛶	𬛷	𬛸	𬛹	𬛺	𬛻	𬛼	𬛽	𬛾	𬛿
U+2C70x	𬜀	𬜁	𬜂	𬜃	𬜄	𬜅	𬜆	𬜇	𬜈	𬜉	𬜊	𬜋	𬜌	𬜍	𬜎	𬜏
U+2C71x	𬜐	𬜑	𬜒	𬜓	𬜔	𬜕	𬜖	𬜗	𬜘	𬜙	𬜚	𬜛	𬜜	𬜝	𬜞	𬜟
U+2C72x	𬜠	𬜡	𬜢	𬜣	𬜤	𬜥	𬜦	𬜧	𬜨	𬜩	𬜪	𬜫	𬜬	𬜭	𬜮	𬜯
U+2C73x	𬜰	𬜱	𬜲	𬜳	𬜴	𬜵	𬜶	𬜷	𬜸	𬜹	𬜺	𬜻	𬜼	𬜽	𬜾	𬜿
U+2C74x	𬝀	𬝁	𬝂	𬝃	𬝄	𬝅	𬝆	𬝇	𬝈	𬝉	𬝊	𬝋	𬝌	𬝍	𬝎	𬝏
U+2C75x	𬝐	𬝑	𬝒	𬝓	𬝔	𬝕	𬝖	𬝗	𬝘	𬝙	𬝚	𬝛	𬝜	𬝝	𬝞	𬝟
U+2C76x	𬝠	𬝡	𬝢	𬝣	𬝤	𬝥	𬝦	𬝧	𬝨	𬝩	𬝪	𬝫	𬝬	𬝭	𬝮	𬝯
U+2C77x	𬝰	𬝱	𬝲	𬝳	𬝴	𬝵	𬝶	𬝷	𬝸	𬝹	𬝺	𬝻	𬝼	𬝽	𬝾	𬝿
U+2C78x	𬞀	𬞁	𬞂	𬞃	𬞄	𬞅	𬞆	𬞇	𬞈	𬞉	𬞊	𬞋	𬞌	𬞍	𬞎	𬞏
U+2C79x	𬞐	𬞑	𬞒	𬞓	𬞔	𬞕	𬞖	𬞗	𬞘	𬞙	𬞚	𬞛	𬞜	𬞝	𬞞	𬞟
U+2C7Ax	𬞠	𬞡	𬞢	𬞣	𬞤	𬞥	𬞦	𬞧	𬞨	𬞩	𬞪	𬞫	𬞬	𬞭	𬞮	𬞯
U+2C7Bx	𬞰	𬞱	𬞲	𬞳	𬞴	𬞵	𬞶	𬞷	𬞸	𬞹	𬞺	𬞻	𬞼	𬞽	𬞾	𬞿
U+2C7Cx	𬟀	𬟁	𬟂	𬟃	𬟄	𬟅	𬟆	𬟇	𬟈	𬟉	𬟊	𬟋	𬟌	𬟍	𬟎	𬟏
U+2C7Dx	𬟐	𬟑	𬟒	𬟓	𬟔	𬟕	𬟖	𬟗	𬟘	𬟙	𬟚	𬟛	𬟜	𬟝	𬟞	𬟟
U+2C7Ex	𬟠	𬟡	𬟢	𬟣	𬟤	𬟥	𬟦	𬟧	𬟨	𬟩	𬟪	𬟫	𬟬	𬟭	𬟮	𬟯
U+2C7Fx	𬟰	𬟱	𬟲	𬟳	𬟴	𬟵	𬟶	𬟷	𬟸	𬟹	𬟺	𬟻	𬟼	𬟽	𬟾	𬟿
U+2C80x	𬠀	𬠁	𬠂	𬠃	𬠄	𬠅	𬠆	𬠇	𬠈	𬠉	𬠊	𬠋	𬠌	𬠍	𬠎	𬠏
U+2C81x	𬠐	𬠑	𬠒	𬠓	𬠔	𬠕	𬠖	𬠗	𬠘	𬠙	𬠚	𬠛	𬠜	𬠝	𬠞	𬠟
U+2C82x	𬠠	𬠡	𬠢	𬠣	𬠤	𬠥	𬠦	𬠧	𬠨	𬠩	𬠪	𬠫	𬠬	𬠭	𬠮	𬠯
U+2C83x	𬠰	𬠱	𬠲	𬠳	𬠴	𬠵	𬠶	𬠷	𬠸	𬠹	𬠺	𬠻	𬠼	𬠽	𬠾	𬠿
U+2C84x	𬡀	𬡁	𬡂	𬡃	𬡄	𬡅	𬡆	𬡇	𬡈	𬡉	𬡊	𬡋	𬡌	𬡍	𬡎	𬡏
U+2C85x	𬡐	𬡑	𬡒	𬡓	𬡔	𬡕	𬡖	𬡗	𬡘	𬡙	𬡚	𬡛	𬡜	𬡝	𬡞	𬡟
U+2C86x	𬡠	𬡡	𬡢	𬡣	𬡤	𬡥	𬡦	𬡧	𬡨	𬡩	𬡪	𬡫	𬡬	𬡭	𬡮	𬡯
U+2C87x	𬡰	𬡱	𬡲	𬡳	𬡴	𬡵	𬡶	𬡷	𬡸	𬡹	𬡺	𬡻	𬡼	𬡽	𬡾	𬡿
U+2C88x	𬢀	𬢁	𬢂	𬢃	𬢄	𬢅	𬢆	𬢇	𬢈	𬢉	𬢊	𬢋	𬢌	𬢍	𬢎	𬢏
U+2C89x	𬢐	𬢑	𬢒	𬢓	𬢔	𬢕	𬢖	𬢗	𬢘	𬢙	𬢚	𬢛	𬢜	𬢝	𬢞	𬢟
U+2C8Ax	𬢠	𬢡	𬢢	𬢣	𬢤	𬢥	𬢦	𬢧	𬢨	𬢩	𬢪	𬢫	𬢬	𬢭	𬢮	𬢯
U+2C8Bx	𬢰	𬢱	𬢲	𬢳	𬢴	𬢵	𬢶	𬢷	𬢸	𬢹	𬢺	𬢻	𬢼	𬢽	𬢾	𬢿
U+2C8Cx	𬣀	𬣁	𬣂	𬣃	𬣄	𬣅	𬣆	𬣇	𬣈	𬣉	𬣊	𬣋	𬣌	𬣍	𬣎	𬣏
U+2C8Dx	𬣐	𬣑	𬣒	𬣓	𬣔	𬣕	𬣖	𬣗	𬣘	𬣙	𬣚	𬣛	𬣜	𬣝	𬣞	𬣟
U+2C8Ex	𬣠	𬣡	𬣢	𬣣	𬣤	𬣥	𬣦	𬣧	𬣨	𬣩	𬣪	𬣫	𬣬	𬣭	𬣮	𬣯
U+2C8Fx	𬣰	𬣱	𬣲	𬣳	𬣴	𬣵	𬣶	𬣷	𬣸	𬣹	𬣺	𬣻	𬣼	𬣽	𬣾	𬣿
U+2C90x	𬤀	𬤁	𬤂	𬤃	𬤄	𬤅	𬤆	𬤇	𬤈	𬤉	𬤊	𬤋	𬤌	𬤍	𬤎	𬤏
U+2C91x	𬤐	𬤑	𬤒	𬤓	𬤔	𬤕	𬤖	𬤗	𬤘	𬤙	𬤚	𬤛	𬤜	𬤝	𬤞	𬤟
U+2C92x	𬤠	𬤡	𬤢	𬤣	𬤤	𬤥	𬤦	𬤧	𬤨	𬤩	𬤪	𬤫	𬤬	𬤭	𬤮	𬤯
U+2C93x	𬤰	𬤱	𬤲	𬤳	𬤴	𬤵	𬤶	𬤷	𬤸	𬤹	𬤺	𬤻	𬤼	𬤽	𬤾	𬤿
U+2C94x	𬥀	𬥁	𬥂	𬥃	𬥄	𬥅	𬥆	𬥇	𬥈	𬥉	𬥊	𬥋	𬥌	𬥍	𬥎	𬥏
U+2C95x	𬥐	𬥑	𬥒	𬥓	𬥔	𬥕	𬥖	𬥗	𬥘	𬥙	𬥚	𬥛	𬥜	𬥝	𬥞	𬥟
U+2C96x	𬥠	𬥡	𬥢	𬥣	𬥤	𬥥	𬥦	𬥧	𬥨	𬥩	𬥪	𬥫	𬥬	𬥭	𬥮	𬥯
U+2C97x	𬥰	𬥱	𬥲	𬥳	𬥴	𬥵	𬥶	𬥷	𬥸	𬥹	𬥺	𬥻	𬥼	𬥽	𬥾	𬥿
U+2C98x	𬦀	𬦁	𬦂	𬦃	𬦄	𬦅	𬦆	𬦇	𬦈	𬦉	𬦊	𬦋	𬦌	𬦍	𬦎	𬦏
U+2C99x	𬦐	𬦑	𬦒	𬦓	𬦔	𬦕	𬦖	𬦗	𬦘	𬦙	𬦚	𬦛	𬦜	𬦝	𬦞	𬦟
U+2C9Ax	𬦠	𬦡	𬦢	𬦣	𬦤	𬦥	𬦦	𬦧	𬦨	𬦩	𬦪	𬦫	𬦬	𬦭	𬦮	𬦯
U+2C9Bx	𬦰	𬦱	𬦲	𬦳	𬦴	𬦵	𬦶	𬦷	𬦸	𬦹	𬦺	𬦻	𬦼	𬦽	𬦾	𬦿
U+2C9Cx	𬧀	𬧁	𬧂	𬧃	𬧄	𬧅	𬧆	𬧇	𬧈	𬧉	𬧊	𬧋	𬧌	𬧍	𬧎	𬧏
U+2C9Dx	𬧐	𬧑	𬧒	𬧓	𬧔	𬧕	𬧖	𬧗	𬧘	𬧙	𬧚	𬧛	𬧜	𬧝	𬧞	𬧟
U+2C9Ex	𬧠	𬧡	𬧢	𬧣	𬧤	𬧥	𬧦	𬧧	𬧨	𬧩	𬧪	𬧫	𬧬	𬧭	𬧮	𬧯
U+2C9Fx	𬧰	𬧱	𬧲	𬧳	𬧴	𬧵	𬧶	𬧷	𬧸	𬧹	𬧺	𬧻	𬧼	𬧽	𬧾	𬧿
U+2CA0x	𬨀	𬨁	𬨂	𬨃	𬨄	𬨅	𬨆	𬨇	𬨈	𬨉	𬨊	𬨋	𬨌	𬨍	𬨎	𬨏
U+2CA1x	𬨐	𬨑	𬨒	𬨓	𬨔	𬨕	𬨖	𬨗	𬨘	𬨙	𬨚	𬨛	𬨜	𬨝	𬨞	𬨟
U+2CA2x	𬨠	𬨡	𬨢	𬨣	𬨤	𬨥	𬨦	𬨧	𬨨	𬨩	𬨪	𬨫	𬨬	𬨭	𬨮	𬨯
U+2CA3x	𬨰	𬨱	𬨲	𬨳	𬨴	𬨵	𬨶	𬨷	𬨸	𬨹	𬨺	𬨻	𬨼	𬨽	𬨾	𬨿
U+2CA4x	𬩀	𬩁	𬩂	𬩃	𬩄	𬩅	𬩆	𬩇	𬩈	𬩉	𬩊	𬩋	𬩌	𬩍	𬩎	𬩏
U+2CA5x	𬩐	𬩑	𬩒	𬩓	𬩔	𬩕	𬩖	𬩗	𬩘	𬩙	𬩚	𬩛	𬩜	𬩝	𬩞	𬩟
U+2CA6x	𬩠	𬩡	𬩢	𬩣	𬩤	𬩥	𬩦	𬩧	𬩨	𬩩	𬩪	𬩫	𬩬	𬩭	𬩮	𬩯
U+2CA7x	𬩰	𬩱	𬩲	𬩳	𬩴	𬩵	𬩶	𬩷	𬩸	𬩹	𬩺	𬩻	𬩼	𬩽	𬩾	𬩿
U+2CA8x	𬪀	𬪁	𬪂	𬪃	𬪄	𬪅	𬪆	𬪇	𬪈	𬪉	𬪊	𬪋	𬪌	𬪍	𬪎	𬪏
U+2CA9x	𬪐	𬪑	𬪒	𬪓	𬪔	𬪕	𬪖	𬪗	𬪘	𬪙	𬪚	𬪛	𬪜	𬪝	𬪞	𬪟
U+2CAAx	𬪠	𬪡	𬪢	𬪣	𬪤	𬪥	𬪦	𬪧	𬪨	𬪩	𬪪	𬪫	𬪬	𬪭	𬪮	𬪯
U+2CABx	𬪰	𬪱	𬪲	𬪳	𬪴	𬪵	𬪶	𬪷	𬪸	𬪹	𬪺	𬪻	𬪼	𬪽	𬪾	𬪿
U+2CACx	𬫀	𬫁	𬫂	𬫃	𬫄	𬫅	𬫆	𬫇	𬫈	𬫉	𬫊	𬫋	𬫌	𬫍	𬫎	𬫏
U+2CADx	𬫐	𬫑	𬫒	𬫓	𬫔	𬫕	𬫖	𬫗	𬫘	𬫙	𬫚	𬫛	𬫜	𬫝	𬫞	𬫟
U+2CAEx	𬫠	𬫡	𬫢	𬫣	𬫤	𬫥	𬫦	𬫧	𬫨	𬫩	𬫪	𬫫	𬫬	𬫭	𬫮	𬫯
U+2CAFx	𬫰	𬫱	𬫲	𬫳	𬫴	𬫵	𬫶	𬫷	𬫸	𬫹	𬫺	𬫻	𬫼	𬫽	𬫾	𬫿
U+2CB0x	𬬀	𬬁	𬬂	𬬃	𬬄	𬬅	𬬆	𬬇	𬬈	𬬉	𬬊	𬬋	𬬌	𬬍	𬬎	𬬏
U+2CB1x	𬬐	𬬑	𬬒	𬬓	𬬔	𬬕	𬬖	𬬗	𬬘	𬬙	𬬚	𬬛	𬬜	𬬝	𬬞	𬬟
U+2CB2x	𬬠	𬬡	𬬢	𬬣	𬬤	𬬥	𬬦	𬬧	𬬨	𬬩	𬬪	𬬫	𬬬	𬬭	𬬮	𬬯
U+2CB3x	𬬰	𬬱	𬬲	𬬳	𬬴	𬬵	𬬶	𬬷	𬬸	𬬹	𬬺	𬬻	𬬼	𬬽	𬬾	𬬿
U+2CB4x	𬭀	𬭁	𬭂	𬭃	𬭄	𬭅	𬭆	𬭇	𬭈	𬭉	𬭊	𬭋	𬭌	𬭍	𬭎	𬭏
U+2CB5x	𬭐	𬭑	𬭒	𬭓	𬭔	𬭕	𬭖	𬭗	𬭘	𬭙	𬭚	𬭛	𬭜	𬭝	𬭞	𬭟
U+2CB6x	𬭠	𬭡	𬭢	𬭣	𬭤	𬭥	𬭦	𬭧	𬭨	𬭩	𬭪	𬭫	𬭬	𬭭	𬭮	𬭯
U+2CB7x	𬭰	𬭱	𬭲	𬭳	𬭴	𬭵	𬭶	𬭷	𬭸	𬭹	𬭺	𬭻	𬭼	𬭽	𬭾	𬭿
U+2CB8x	𬮀	𬮁	𬮂	𬮃	𬮄	𬮅	𬮆	𬮇	𬮈	𬮉	𬮊	𬮋	𬮌	𬮍	𬮎	𬮏
U+2CB9x	𬮐	𬮑	𬮒	𬮓	𬮔	𬮕	𬮖	𬮗	𬮘	𬮙	𬮚	𬮛	𬮜	𬮝	𬮞	𬮟
U+2CBAx	𬮠	𬮡	𬮢	𬮣	𬮤	𬮥	𬮦	𬮧	𬮨	𬮩	𬮪	𬮫	𬮬	𬮭	𬮮	𬮯
U+2CBBx	𬮰	𬮱	𬮲	𬮳	𬮴	𬮵	𬮶	𬮷	𬮸	𬮹	𬮺	𬮻	𬮼	𬮽	𬮾	𬮿
U+2CBCx	𬯀	𬯁	𬯂	𬯃	𬯄	𬯅	𬯆	𬯇	𬯈	𬯉	𬯊	𬯋	𬯌	𬯍	𬯎	𬯏
U+2CBDx	𬯐	𬯑	𬯒	𬯓	𬯔	𬯕	𬯖	𬯗	𬯘	𬯙	𬯚	𬯛	𬯜	𬯝	𬯞	𬯟
U+2CBEx	𬯠	𬯡	𬯢	𬯣	𬯤	𬯥	𬯦	𬯧	𬯨	𬯩	𬯪	𬯫	𬯬	𬯭	𬯮	𬯯
U+2CBFx	𬯰	𬯱	𬯲	𬯳	𬯴	𬯵	𬯶	𬯷	𬯸	𬯹	𬯺	𬯻	𬯼	𬯽	𬯾	𬯿
U+2CC0x	𬰀	𬰁	𬰂	𬰃	𬰄	𬰅	𬰆	𬰇	𬰈	𬰉	𬰊	𬰋	𬰌	𬰍	𬰎	𬰏
U+2CC1x	𬰐	𬰑	𬰒	𬰓	𬰔	𬰕	𬰖	𬰗	𬰘	𬰙	𬰚	𬰛	𬰜	𬰝	𬰞	𬰟
U+2CC2x	𬰠	𬰡	𬰢	𬰣	𬰤	𬰥	𬰦	𬰧	𬰨	𬰩	𬰪	𬰫	𬰬	𬰭	𬰮	𬰯
U+2CC3x	𬰰	𬰱	𬰲	𬰳	𬰴	𬰵	𬰶	𬰷	𬰸	𬰹	𬰺	𬰻	𬰼	𬰽	𬰾	𬰿
U+2CC4x	𬱀	𬱁	𬱂	𬱃	𬱄	𬱅	𬱆	𬱇	𬱈	𬱉	𬱊	𬱋	𬱌	𬱍	𬱎	𬱏
U+2CC5x	𬱐	𬱑	𬱒	𬱓	𬱔	𬱕	𬱖	𬱗	𬱘	𬱙	𬱚	𬱛	𬱜	𬱝	𬱞	𬱟
U+2CC6x	𬱠	𬱡	𬱢	𬱣	𬱤	𬱥	𬱦	𬱧	𬱨	𬱩	𬱪	𬱫	𬱬	𬱭	𬱮	𬱯
U+2CC7x	𬱰	𬱱	𬱲	𬱳	𬱴	𬱵	𬱶	𬱷	𬱸	𬱹	𬱺	𬱻	𬱼	𬱽	𬱾	𬱿
U+2CC8x	𬲀	𬲁	𬲂	𬲃	𬲄	𬲅	𬲆	𬲇	𬲈	𬲉	𬲊	𬲋	𬲌	𬲍	𬲎	𬲏
U+2CC9x	𬲐	𬲑	𬲒	𬲓	𬲔	𬲕	𬲖	𬲗	𬲘	𬲙	𬲚	𬲛	𬲜	𬲝	𬲞	𬲟
U+2CCAx	𬲠	𬲡	𬲢	𬲣	𬲤	𬲥	𬲦	𬲧	𬲨	𬲩	𬲪	𬲫	𬲬	𬲭	𬲮	𬲯
U+2CCBx	𬲰	𬲱	𬲲	𬲳	𬲴	𬲵	𬲶	𬲷	𬲸	𬲹	𬲺	𬲻	𬲼	𬲽	𬲾	𬲿
U+2CCCx	𬳀	𬳁	𬳂	𬳃	𬳄	𬳅	𬳆	𬳇	𬳈	𬳉	𬳊	𬳋	𬳌	𬳍	𬳎	𬳏
U+2CCDx	𬳐	𬳑	𬳒	𬳓	𬳔	𬳕	𬳖	𬳗	𬳘	𬳙	𬳚	𬳛	𬳜	𬳝	𬳞	𬳟
U+2CCEx	𬳠	𬳡	𬳢	𬳣	𬳤	𬳥	𬳦	𬳧	𬳨	𬳩	𬳪	𬳫	𬳬	𬳭	𬳮	𬳯
U+2CCFx	𬳰	𬳱	𬳲	𬳳	𬳴	𬳵	𬳶	𬳷	𬳸	𬳹	𬳺	𬳻	𬳼	𬳽	𬳾	𬳿
U+2CD0x	𬴀	𬴁	𬴂	𬴃	𬴄	𬴅	𬴆	𬴇	𬴈	𬴉	𬴊	𬴋	𬴌	𬴍	𬴎	𬴏
U+2CD1x	𬴐	𬴑	𬴒	𬴓	𬴔	𬴕	𬴖	𬴗	𬴘	𬴙	𬴚	𬴛	𬴜	𬴝	𬴞	𬴟
U+2CD2x	𬴠	𬴡	𬴢	𬴣	𬴤	𬴥	𬴦	𬴧	𬴨	𬴩	𬴪	𬴫	𬴬	𬴭	𬴮	𬴯
U+2CD3x	𬴰	𬴱	𬴲	𬴳	𬴴	𬴵	𬴶	𬴷	𬴸	𬴹	𬴺	𬴻	𬴼	𬴽	𬴾	𬴿
U+2CD4x	𬵀	𬵁	𬵂	𬵃	𬵄	𬵅	𬵆	𬵇	𬵈	𬵉	𬵊	𬵋	𬵌	𬵍	𬵎	𬵏
U+2CD5x	𬵐	𬵑	𬵒	𬵓	𬵔	𬵕	𬵖	𬵗	𬵘	𬵙	𬵚	𬵛	𬵜	𬵝	𬵞	𬵟
U+2CD6x	𬵠	𬵡	𬵢	𬵣	𬵤	𬵥	𬵦	𬵧	𬵨	𬵩	𬵪	𬵫	𬵬	𬵭	𬵮	𬵯
U+2CD7x	𬵰	𬵱	𬵲	𬵳	𬵴	𬵵	𬵶	𬵷	𬵸	𬵹	𬵺	𬵻	𬵼	𬵽	𬵾	𬵿
U+2CD8x	𬶀	𬶁	𬶂	𬶃	𬶄	𬶅	𬶆	𬶇	𬶈	𬶉	𬶊	𬶋	𬶌	𬶍	𬶎	𬶏
U+2CD9x	𬶐	𬶑	𬶒	𬶓	𬶔	𬶕	𬶖	𬶗	𬶘	𬶙	𬶚	𬶛	𬶜	𬶝	𬶞	𬶟
U+2CDAx	𬶠	𬶡	𬶢	𬶣	𬶤	𬶥	𬶦	𬶧	𬶨	𬶩	𬶪	𬶫	𬶬	𬶭	𬶮	𬶯
U+2CDBx	𬶰	𬶱	𬶲	𬶳	𬶴	𬶵	𬶶	𬶷	𬶸	𬶹	𬶺	𬶻	𬶼	𬶽	𬶾	𬶿
U+2CDCx	𬷀	𬷁	𬷂	𬷃	𬷄	𬷅	𬷆	𬷇	𬷈	𬷉	𬷊	𬷋	𬷌	𬷍	𬷎	𬷏
U+2CDDx	𬷐	𬷑	𬷒	𬷓	𬷔	𬷕	𬷖	𬷗	𬷘	𬷙	𬷚	𬷛	𬷜	𬷝	𬷞	𬷟
U+2CDEx	𬷠	𬷡	𬷢	𬷣	𬷤	𬷥	𬷦	𬷧	𬷨	𬷩	𬷪	𬷫	𬷬	𬷭	𬷮	𬷯
U+2CDFx	𬷰	𬷱	𬷲	𬷳	𬷴	𬷵	𬷶	𬷷	𬷸	𬷹	𬷺	𬷻	𬷼	𬷽	𬷾	𬷿
U+2CE0x	𬸀	𬸁	𬸂	𬸃	𬸄	𬸅	𬸆	𬸇	𬸈	𬸉	𬸊	𬸋	𬸌	𬸍	𬸎	𬸏
U+2CE1x	𬸐	𬸑	𬸒	𬸓	𬸔	𬸕	𬸖	𬸗	𬸘	𬸙	𬸚	𬸛	𬸜	𬸝	𬸞	𬸟
U+2CE2x	𬸠	𬸡	𬸢	𬸣	𬸤	𬸥	𬸦	𬸧	𬸨	𬸩	𬸪	𬸫	𬸬	𬸭	𬸮	𬸯
U+2CE3x	𬸰	𬸱	𬸲	𬸳	𬸴	𬸵	𬸶	𬸷	𬸸	𬸹	𬸺	𬸻	𬸼	𬸽	𬸾	𬸿
U+2CE4x	𬹀	𬹁	𬹂	𬹃	𬹄	𬹅	𬹆	𬹇	𬹈	𬹉	𬹊	𬹋	𬹌	𬹍	𬹎	𬹏
U+2CE5x	𬹐	𬹑	𬹒	𬹓	𬹔	𬹕	𬹖	𬹗	𬹘	𬹙	𬹚	𬹛	𬹜	𬹝	𬹞	𬹟
U+2CE6x	𬹠	𬹡	𬹢	𬹣	𬹤	𬹥	𬹦	𬹧	𬹨	𬹩	𬹪	𬹫	𬹬	𬹭	𬹮	𬹯
U+2CE7x	𬹰	𬹱	𬹲	𬹳	𬹴	𬹵	𬹶	𬹷	𬹸	𬹹	𬹺	𬹻	𬹼	𬹽	𬹾	𬹿
U+2CE8x	𬺀	𬺁	𬺂	𬺃	𬺄	𬺅	𬺆	𬺇	𬺈	𬺉	𬺊	𬺋	𬺌	𬺍	𬺎	𬺏
U+2CE9x	𬺐	𬺑	𬺒	𬺓	𬺔	𬺕	𬺖	𬺗	𬺘	𬺙	𬺚	𬺛	𬺜	𬺝	𬺞	𬺟
U+2CEAx	𬺠	𬺡	𬺢	𬺣	𬺤	𬺥	𬺦	𬺧	𬺨	𬺩	𬺪	𬺫	𬺬	𬺭		
Notes 1.As of Unicode version 17.0 2.Grey areas indicate non-assigned code points

== History ==
The following Unicode-related documents record the purpose and process of defining specific characters in the CJK Unified Ideographs Extension E block:

Version	Final code points (Note: Proposed code points and characters names may differ from final code points and names)	Count	L2 ID	WG2 ID	IRG ID	Document
8.0	U+2B820..2CEA1	5,762	L2/04-185			Jenkins, John (2004-06-07), Propsed [sic] Extension C2 Submission
8.0	U+2B820..2CEA1	5,762	L2/06-364			Jenkins, John (2006-11-01), Proposed UTC C2 Submission
8.0	U+2B820..2CEA1	5,762	L2/06-365			Jenkins, John (2006-11-01), Proposed UTC C2 Non-submission
8.0	U+2B820..2CEA1	5,762	L2/06-366			Jenkins, John (2006-11-08), Status of Characters Submitted to the UTC for Inclusion in the Standard
8.0	U+2B820..2CEA1	5,762	L2/11-243	N4111		Sources for Orphaned CJK Ideographs, 2011-06-14
8.0	U+2B820..2CEA1	5,762	L2/11-254			Constable, Peter (2011-06-20), "Update to UTR #45 U-Source Ideographs requested", UTC Liaison Report from WG2
8.0	U+2B820..2CEA1	5,762		N4103		"Resolution 58.05", Unconfirmed minutes of WG 2 meeting 58, 2012-01-03
8.0	U+2B820..2CEA1	5,762		N4358		Proposal Summary Form - CJK Unified Ideograph Extension E, 2012-10-10
8.0	U+2B820..2CEA1	5,762		N4358-A		Code charts for CJK Unified Ideograph Extension E, 2012-10-10
8.0	U+2B820..2CEA1	5,762		N4358-B		Spread sheet for CJK Unified Ideograph Extension E, 2012-10-10
8.0	U+2B820..2CEA1	5,762		N4439	N1948	CJK_E Correction, 2013-05-22
8.0	U+2B820..2CEA1	5,762		N4353 (pdf, doc)		"M60.07", Unconfirmed minutes of WG 2 meeting 60, 2013-05-23
8.0	U+2B820..2CEA1	5,762	L2/13-132			Moore, Lisa (2013-07-29), "Consensus 136-C29", UTC #136 Minutes, "Accept 5762 CJK characters at U+2B820..U+2CEA1 with block CJK Extension E at U+2B820..U+2CEAF, with code points and glyphs as shown in L2/13-151 for encoding in a future version of the standard."
8.0	U+2B820..2CEA1	5,762	L2/13-177			Chung, Jaemin; Lunde, Ken (2013-08-25), Extension E (WG2 N4459) source glyph error report
8.0	U+2B820..2CEA1	5,762		N4403 (pdf, doc)		Umamaheswaran, V. S. (2014-01-28), "Resolution M61.02 item i", Unconfirmed minutes of WG 2 meeting 61, Holiday Inn, Vilnius, Lithuania; 2013-06-10/14
8.0	U+2B820..2CEA1	5,762	L2/14-094			Chung, Jaemin (2014-04-24), Extension F1 and Extension E unification issue
8.0	U+2B820..2CEA1	5,762	L2/15-216			Lunde, Ken (2015-08-14), Request for kTotalStrokes Data for Extension E & Beyond
8.0	U+2B820..2CEA1	5,762	L2/15-242	N4682		West, Andrew; Fan, Ming (2015-10-16), Error Report for CJK Unified Ideographs Extensions C and E
8.0	U+2B820..2CEA1	5,762		N4739		"M64.06", Unconfirmed minutes of WG 2 meeting 64, 2016-08-31
8.0	U+2B820..2CEA1	5,762	L2/17-180		N2202	Chan, Eiso (2017-06-02), Request for consideration to add kIRG_GSource values to thirteen ideographs and change two G-source glyphs for the Table of General Standard Chinese Characters [Affects U+2BD77, U+2C494, U+2C72F, and U+2CB38]
8.0	U+2B820..2CEA1	5,762		N4974	N2301	Request of TCA's Horizontal Extension for Chemical Terminology [Affects U+2BA52 and U+2C734], 2018-06-12
8.0	U+2B820..2CEA1	5,762		N4987		Proposal on China's Horizontal Extension for 14 CJK Ideographs [Affects U+2BD77, 2C494, 2C72F and 2CB38], 2018-06-13
8.0	U+2B820..2CEA1	5,762		N5020 (pdf, doc)		Umamaheswaran, V. S. (2019-01-11), "10.4.6 and 10.4.8", Unconfirmed minutes of WG 2 meeting 67
8.0	U+2B820..2CEA1	5,762	L2/19-242	N5094	N2370	Chan, Eiso (2019-02-14), 20 questionable V4-Source characters in Ext. C and Ext. E [Affects U+2B83C, U+2B8D9, U+2B8DA, U+2B96F, U+2BBD7, U+2BD61, U+2BE4A, U+2BF9D, U+2C0B8, U+2C142, U+2C316, U+2C3FB, U+2C402, U+2C82C, U+2C83A, U+2C9A1, and U+2CC88]
8.0	U+2B820..2CEA1	5,762		N5086	N2379	Proposal of China's horizontal extension for technical used characters [Affects U+2BF1D and U+2C7AC], 2019-05-10
8.0	U+2B820..2CEA1	5,762	L2/19-237	N5068		Editorial Report on Miscellaneous Issues (meeting IRG#52) [Affects U+2B83C, U+2B8D9, U+2B8DA, U+2B96F, U+2BBD7, U+2BD61, U+2BE4A, U+2BF9D, U+2C0B8, U+2C142, U+2C316, U+2C3FB, U+2C402, U+2C82C, U+2C83A, U+2C9A1, and U+2CC88], 2019-05-17
8.0	U+2B820..2CEA1	5,762	L2/19-244	N5107		TCA's UNC Proposal for WG2 submission [Affects U+2CD68], 2019-05-24
8.0	U+2B820..2CEA1	5,762	L2/21-159		N2507	Request for Horizontal Extension in the H-column of the ISO/IEC 10646 Standard [Affects U+2BB37], 2021-08-25
8.0	U+2B820..2CEA1	5,762	L2/21-173			Lunde, Ken (2021-09-29), CJK & Unihan Group Recommendations for UTC #169 Meeting [Affects U+2BB37]
8.0	U+2B820..2CEA1	5,762	L2/21-167			Cummings, Craig (2022-01-27), "Consensus 169-C13 [Affects U+2BB37]", Approved Minutes of UTC Meeting 169
8.0	U+2B820..2CEA1	5,762	L2/22-077		N2512R	Shin, SangHyun; Cho, Sungduk; Kim, Kyongsok (2021-11-02), A revised proposal requesting a Horizontal Extension of 51 Hanja chars (previously submitted for ExtF/G/H) [Affects U+2BD7D, 2C151, 2C1E0, 2C2D6, 2C5CA, 2C810, and 2CD34]
8.0	U+2B820..2CEA1	5,762	L2/22-067			Lunde, Ken (2022-04-16), "19 [Affects U+2BD7D, 2C151, 2C1E0, 2C2D6, 2C5CA, 2C810, and 2CD34]", CJK & Unihan Group Recommendations for UTC #171 Meeting
8.0	U+2B820..2CEA1	5,762	L2/22-061			Constable, Peter (2022-07-27), "E.1 Section 19 [Affects U+2BD7D, 2C151, 2C1E0, 2C2D6, 2C5CA, 2C810, and 2CD34]", Approved Minutes of UTC Meeting 171
8.0	U+2B820..2CEA1	5,762	L2/22-256		N2580R	T-Source Glyph Correction and Horizontal Extension [Affects U+2C816], 2022-10-18
8.0	U+2B820..2CEA1	5,762	L2/22-259		N2556R2	Chan, Eiso; Collins, Lee; Việt, Ngô Trung (2022-10-20), IRGN2556R2 V-Source Glyph and Codes Updates [Affects U+2BC2E, 2BF45, 2C04C, 2C13A, 2C43C, and 2C43E]
8.0	U+2B820..2CEA1	5,762	L2/22-247			Lunde, Ken (2022-11-01), "24) L2/22-256 and 26) L2/22-259", CJK & Unihan Group Recommendations for UTC #173 Meeting
8.0	U+2B820..2CEA1	5,762	L2/22-241			Constable, Peter (2022-11-09), "E.1 24) L2/22-256 and E.1 26) L2/22-259", Approved Minutes of UTC Meeting 173
8.0	U+2B820..2CEA1	5,762	L2/23-244		N2616	Wang, Xieyang (2023-05-04), Suggestions to correct representative glyphs of 4 CJKUIs [Affects U+2B92C]
8.0	U+2B820..2CEA1	5,762	L2/23-243		N2636	Chan, Eiso (2023-07-05), Request to confirm one unification for U+2C21C [Affects 2C21C]
8.0	U+2B820..2CEA1	5,762	L2/23-238R			Anderson, Deborah; Kučera, Jan; Whistler, Ken; Pournader, Roozbeh; Constable, Peter (2023-11-01), "Section 07 [Affects 2C21C]", Recommendations to UTC #177 November 2023 on Script Proposals
8.0	U+2B820..2CEA1	5,762	L2/23-237R			Lunde, Ken (2023-11-02), "07 [Affects 2C21C] and 21 [Affects U+2B92C]", CJK & Unihan Group Recommendations for UTC #177 Meeting
8.0	U+2B820..2CEA1	5,762	L2/23-231			Constable, Peter (2023-12-08), "Section 21 [Affects U+2B92C]", UTC #177 Minutes
17.0	U+2CEA2..2CEAA	9			N2645	Chan, Eiso; Zou, Richard; Liu, Zhao (2023-10-07), Updated proposal on encoding Jianzi Musical Notation and format controls to UCS and Unicode
17.0	U+2CEA2..2CEAA	9			N2728	Chan, Eiso; Liu, Zhao; Zou, Richard; Yang, Tao (2024-10-11), Supplementary information on encoding Jianzi Musical Notation and format controls (IRG N2645)
17.0	U+2CEA2..2CEAA	9			N2753	Chan, Eiso; Liu, Zhao; Zou, Richard; Yang, Tao (2024-11-02), China's UNC proposal on 9 characters
17.0	U+2CEA2..2CEAA	9		N5297	N2765	Lunde, Ken (2025-03-21), "Recommendation IRG M64.05", IRG Meeting #64 Recommendations and Action Items
17.0	U+2CEA2..2CEAA	9			N2767	"6. Urgently needed character (UNC) proposals", Editorial Report on Miscellaneous Issues, 2025-03-21
17.0	U+2CEA2..2CEAA	9	L2/25-090			Lunde, Ken (2025-04-11), "25", CJK & Unihan Working Group Recommendations for UTC Meeting #183
17.0	U+2CEA2..2CEAA	9	L2/25-085			Leroy, Robin (2025-04-28), "Consensus 183-C55", UTC #183 Minutes, "Accept the 12 urgently-needed G-source ideographs"
17.0	U+2CEAB..2CEAD	3			N2802R2	Meng, Du; Li, Zhen; Yang, Tao (2025-03-12), UNC Proposal from National Library of China and NanJing XiaoZhuang University
17.0	U+2CEAB..2CEAD	3		N5297	N2765	Lunde, Ken (2025-03-21), "Recommendation IRG M64.05", IRG Meeting #64 Recommendations and Action Items
17.0	U+2CEAB..2CEAD	3			N2767	"6. Urgently needed character (UNC) proposals", Editorial Report on Miscellaneous Issues, 2025-03-21
17.0	U+2CEAB..2CEAD	3	L2/25-090			Lunde, Ken (2025-04-11), "25", CJK & Unihan Working Group Recommendations for UTC Meeting #183
17.0	U+2CEAB..2CEAD	3	L2/25-085			Leroy, Robin (2025-04-28), "Consensus 183-C55", UTC #183 Minutes, "Accept the 12 urgently-needed G-source ideographs with code points U+2CEA2 through U+2CEAD"
