= CJK Unified Ideographs Extension D =

- Range: U+2B740..U+2B81F (224 code points)
- Plane: SIP
- Scripts: Han
- Assigned: 223 code points
- Unused: 1 reserved code points

Unicode Version History
- 6.0 (2010): 222 (+222)
- 18.0 (2026): 223 (+1)

Unicode documentation
- Code chart ∣ Web page

CJK Unified Ideographs Extension D is a Unicode block containing uncommon CJK ideographs for Chinese, Japanese, Korean, and Vietnamese, some of which are in current use. Much smaller than most Unicode blocks for CJK unified ideographs, Extension D consists of characters which were submitted to the Ideographic Research Group as "urgently needed characters" between 2006 and 2009. Characters submitted during the same period which were needed less urgently were included in CJK Unified Ideographs Extension E instead.

The block has hundreds of ideographic variation sequences registered in the Unicode Ideographic Variation Database (IVD). These sequences specify the desired glyph variant for a given Unicode character.

== Block ==
CJK Unified Ideographs Extension D^{[1]}^{[2]} Official Unicode Consortium code chart (PDF)
	0	1	2	3	4	5	6	7	8	9	A	B	C	D	E	F
U+2B74x	𫝀	𫝁	𫝂	𫝃	𫝄	𫝅	𫝆	𫝇	𫝈	𫝉	𫝊	𫝋	𫝌	𫝍	𫝎	𫝏
U+2B75x	𫝐	𫝑	𫝒	𫝓	𫝔	𫝕	𫝖	𫝗	𫝘	𫝙	𫝚	𫝛	𫝜	𫝝	𫝞	𫝟
U+2B76x	𫝠	𫝡	𫝢	𫝣	𫝤	𫝥	𫝦	𫝧	𫝨	𫝩	𫝪	𫝫	𫝬	𫝭	𫝮	𫝯
U+2B77x	𫝰	𫝱	𫝲	𫝳	𫝴	𫝵	𫝶	𫝷	𫝸	𫝹	𫝺	𫝻	𫝼	𫝽	𫝾	𫝿
U+2B78x	𫞀	𫞁	𫞂	𫞃	𫞄	𫞅	𫞆	𫞇	𫞈	𫞉	𫞊	𫞋	𫞌	𫞍	𫞎	𫞏
U+2B79x	𫞐	𫞑	𫞒	𫞓	𫞔	𫞕	𫞖	𫞗	𫞘	𫞙	𫞚	𫞛	𫞜	𫞝	𫞞	𫞟
U+2B7Ax	𫞠	𫞡	𫞢	𫞣	𫞤	𫞥	𫞦	𫞧	𫞨	𫞩	𫞪	𫞫	𫞬	𫞭	𫞮	𫞯
U+2B7Bx	𫞰	𫞱	𫞲	𫞳	𫞴	𫞵	𫞶	𫞷	𫞸	𫞹	𫞺	𫞻	𫞼	𫞽	𫞾	𫞿
U+2B7Cx	𫟀	𫟁	𫟂	𫟃	𫟄	𫟅	𫟆	𫟇	𫟈	𫟉	𫟊	𫟋	𫟌	𫟍	𫟎	𫟏
U+2B7Dx	𫟐	𫟑	𫟒	𫟓	𫟔	𫟕	𫟖	𫟗	𫟘	𫟙	𫟚	𫟛	𫟜	𫟝	𫟞	𫟟
U+2B7Ex	𫟠	𫟡	𫟢	𫟣	𫟤	𫟥	𫟦	𫟧	𫟨	𫟩	𫟪	𫟫	𫟬	𫟭	𫟮	𫟯
U+2B7Fx	𫟰	𫟱	𫟲	𫟳	𫟴	𫟵	𫟶	𫟷	𫟸	𫟹	𫟺	𫟻	𫟼	𫟽	𫟾	𫟿
U+2B80x	𫠀	𫠁	𫠂	𫠃	𫠄	𫠅	𫠆	𫠇	𫠈	𫠉	𫠊	𫠋	𫠌	𫠍	𫠎	𫠏
U+2B81x	𫠐	𫠑	𫠒	𫠓	𫠔	𫠕	𫠖	𫠗	𫠘	𫠙	𫠚	𫠛	𫠜	𫠝	𫠞	
Notes 1.As of Unicode version 18.0 2.Grey area indicates non-assigned code points

== History ==
The following Unicode-related documents record the purpose and process of defining specific characters in the CJK Unified Ideographs Extension D block:

Version	Final code points (Note: Proposed code points and characters names may differ from final code points and names)	Count	L2 ID	WG2 ID	IRG ID	Document
6.0	U+2B740..2B81D	222	L2/07-333			Lunde, Ken (2007-10-02), Proposal to add twenty-one CJK Unified Ideographs to the UCS
6.0	U+2B740..2B81D	222	L2/09-214	N3560		IRG URGENT Version4.0(M Set) [Macao set], 2008-12-24
6.0	U+2B740..2B81D	222		N3560_C	N1532R	Evidences of Urgently Needed Characters (China set), 2008-12-31
6.0	U+2B740..2B81D	222		N3560_U		Jenkins, John (2009-04-14), UNC source information for U-source characters
6.0	U+2B740..2B81D	222		N3560_J		Lunde, Ken (2007-11-11), Additional references for IRG N1367
6.0	U+2B740..2B81D	222		N3560_T	N1305	Request to add 24 new characters to CJK D, 2007-05-30
6.0	U+2B740..2B81D	222	L2/09-234	N3603 (pdf, doc)		Umamaheswaran, V. S. (2009-07-08), "M54.08", Unconfirmed minutes of WG 2 meeting 54
6.0	U+2B740..2B81D	222	L2/09-177			Whistler, Ken (2009-05-01), "L", WG2 Consent Docket
6.0	U+2B740..2B81D	222	L2/09-220			Jenkins, John (2009-05-15), Requirement for Additional Source Information in the Extension D Documentation
6.0	U+2B740..2B81D	222	L2/09-104			Moore, Lisa (2009-05-20), "CJK — IRG Urgently Needed Characters", UTC #119 / L2 #216 Minutes
6.0	U+2B740..2B81D	222	L2/09-239			Source information for CJK Extension D on ISO/IEC 10646, 2009-07-10
6.0	U+2B740..2B81D	222		N3703 (pdf, doc)		Umamaheswaran, V. S. (2010-04-13), "M55.9l", Unconfirmed minutes of WG 2 meeting no. 55, Tokyo 2009-10-26/30
6.0	U+2B740..2B81D	222		N3831		Input from China on G sources CJK Extension D, 2010-04-21
6.0	U+2B740..2B81D	222	L2/10-108			Moore, Lisa (2010-05-19), "Consensus 123-C4", UTC #123 / L2 #220 Minutes
18.0	U+2B81E	1			N2730	Sim, CheonHyeong (2024-10-10), "U+6B25", Proposal to Disunify two Kangxi Charaers (Redux)
18.0	U+2B81E	1			N2743	Yang, Tao (2024-10-17), Feedback on IRGN2730
18.0	U+2B81E	1			N2805R2	Yang, Tao (2025-03-03), Feedback on IRG N2743/N2747/N2772R/N2787/N2790
18.0	U+2B81E	1			N2889R2	Yang, Tao; Wang, Xieyang (2025-10-11), "2", Feedback on IRGN2884, IRGN2838 and IRGN2730
18.0	U+2B81E	1			N2876R2	Yang, Tao (2025-10-15), "3", Feedback on IRGN2851/N2853/N2855/N2869/N2730/N2871
18.0	U+2B81E	1			N2826	"Recommendation M65.06", IRG Meeting #65 Recommendations and Action Items, 2025-10-16
18.0	U+2B81E	1	L2/25-231			Lunde, Ken (2025-10-20), "26", CJK & Unihan Working Group Recommendations for UTC Meeting #185
18.0	U+2B81E	1	L2/25-226			"E.1 Section 26", UTC #185 Minutes, 2025-10-29, "Consensus 185-C19: Accept the disunification of U+6B25 ..."
