= Little Ghost =

Little Ghost may refer to:

- "Little Ghost", a song by The White Stripes from Get Behind Me Satan
- Little Ghost (band), a British alternative rock band
  - Little Ghost EP, a 2013 release by the group
- The Little Ghost, a 1966 children's book written by Otfried Preußler
  - Das Kleine Gespenst, translated as "The Little Ghost", 2013 German movie based on the book
