= Variation Selectors (Unicode block) =

- Range: U+FE00..U+FE0F (16 code points)
- Plane: BMP
- Scripts: Inherited
- Assigned: 16 code points
- Unused: 0 reserved code points

Unicode Version History
- 3.2 (2002): 16 (+16)

Unicode documentation
- Code chart ∣ Web page

Variation Selectors is a Unicode block containing 16 variation selectors used to specify a glyph variant for a preceding character. They are currently used to specify standardized variation sequences for mathematical symbols, emoji symbols, 'Phags-pa letters, and CJK unified ideographs corresponding to CJK compatibility ideographs.

These combining characters are variation selector-1 (for U+FE00) through variation selector-16 (U+FE0F), and are abbreviated VS1 – VS16. Each applies to the immediately preceding character.

At present, only standardized variation sequences with VS1–VS4, VS7, VS15 and VS16 have been defined; VS15 and VS16 are reserved to request that a character should be displayed as text or as an emoji respectively.

As of Unicode 17.0:

- CJK compatibility ideograph variation sequences contain VS1–VS3 (U+FE00–U+FE02)
- CJK Unified Ideographs Extension A and B variation sequences contain VS1 (U+FE00) and VS2 (U+FE01)
- Emoji variation sequences contain VS16 (U+FE0F) for emoji-style (with color) or VS15 (U+FE0E) for text style (monochrome). This use is deprecated; newer emoji versions of existing dingbat characters have a separate code point for the emoji form, such as U+1FAAF 🪯 KHANDA whose dingbat form is U+262C ☬ ADI SHAKTI.
- Basic Latin, Halfwidth and Fullwidth Forms, Manichaean, Myanmar, Myanmar Extended-A, Phags-pa, and mathematical variation sequences contain only VS1 (U+FE00)
- Egyptian Hieroglyphs variation sequences VS1–VS7 (U+FE00–FE06) are used to rotate specific signs
- VS8–VS14 (U+FE07–FE0D) are not used for any variation sequences

Variation Selectors^{[1]} Official Unicode Consortium code chart (PDF)
	0	1	2	3	4	5	6	7	8	9	A	B	C	D	E	F
U+FE0x	VS; 1	VS; 2	VS; 3	VS; 4	VS; 5	VS; 6	VS; 7	VS; 8	VS; 9	VS; 10	VS; 11	VS; 12	VS; 13	VS; 14	VS; 15	VS; 16
Notes 1.As of Unicode version 18.0

This list is continued in the Variation Selectors Supplement.

== See also ==
- Miscellaneous Symbols and Pictographs § Emoji modifiers
- Variant form (Unicode)

== History ==
The following Unicode-related documents record the purpose and process of defining specific characters in the Variation Selectors block:

Version	Final code points (Note: Proposed code points and characters names may differ from final code points and names)	Count	L2 ID	WG2 ID	Document
3.2	U+FE00..FE0F	16	L2/97-260		Hiura, Hideki; Kobayashi, Tatsuo (1997-12-01), Plane 14 Variant Tag
3.2	U+FE00..FE0F	16	L2/98-039		Aliprand, Joan; Winkler, Arnold (1998-02-24), "2.D.4 Variant Tag Mechanism", Preliminary Minutes - UTC #74 & L2 #171, Mountain View, CA - December 5, 1997
3.2	U+FE00..FE0F	16	L2/98-277		Hiura, Hideki; Kobayashi, Tatsuo (1998-07-29), Plane 14 Variant tag
3.2	U+FE00..FE0F	16	L2/98-281R (pdf, html)		Aliprand, Joan (1998-07-31), "III.E.3 Variant Tagging (III.E.3)", Unconfirmed Minutes – UTC #77 & NCITS Subgroup L2 # 174 JOINT MEETING, Redmond, WA -- July 29-31, 1998
3.2	U+FE00..FE0F	16	L2/00-187		Moore, Lisa (2000-08-23), "Variation Selector", UTC minutes -- Boston, August 8-11, 2000
3.2	U+FE00..FE0F	16	L2/01-268		Freytag, Asmus (2001-06-27), Variant selector
3.2	U+FE00..FE0F	16	L2/01-309		Jenkins, John (2001-08-08), Variation selectors and Han
3.2	U+FE00..FE0F	16	L2/01-324R		Davis, Mark (2001-08-17), Variation Selectors [document has incorrect L2 ID number]
3.2	U+FE00..FE0F	16	L2/01-295R		Moore, Lisa (2001-11-06), "88-M5", Minutes from the UTC/L2 meeting #88
3.2	U+FE00..FE0F	16	L2/02-154	N2403	Umamaheswaran, V. S. (2002-04-22), "7.12", Draft minutes of WG 2 meeting 41, Hotel Phoenix, Singapore, 2001-10-15/19
3.2	U+FE00..FE0F	16	L2/17-086		Burge, Jeremy; et al. (2017-03-27), Add ZWJ, VS-16, Keycaps & Tags to Emoji_Component
3.2	U+FE00..FE0F	16	L2/17-103		Moore, Lisa (2017-05-18), "E.1.7 Add ZWJ, VS-16, Keycaps & Tags to Emoji_Component", UTC #151 Minutes
