= Verse =

Verse or Verses may refer to:

== Poetry ==
- Verse (poetry), a line or lines in a poetic composition
- Verse, a poetry journal with Henry Hart as founding editor

== Music ==
- Verse (band), a hardcore punk band
- The Verses, an Australian band
- Verse Simmonds, 21st century Virgin Islander singer, rapper, songwriter, record producer and record executive
- Verse (rapper), British singer-songwriter Natalia Sinclair (born 1986)
- Ben Mount (born 1977), also known as The Verse or MC Verse, British rapper, producer and record label owner
- Verse (popular music), roughly corresponding to a poetic stanza
- Verses (album), a 1987 album by jazz trumpeter Wallace Roney
- Verses (Apallut), a 2001 album by the Alaskan group Pamyua
- Verse, a 2002 album by Patricia Barber
- "Verses", a commonly used unofficial title for a studio outtake on Toy World by Cardiacs

== Other uses ==
- Jared Verse (born 2000), American football player
- Verse (film), a 2009 Bolivian film
- Verse (river), North Rhine-Westphalia, Germany
- Verse (coding), a functional logic programming language
- Verse protocol, a networking protocol allowing real-time communication between computer graphics software
- Bible verses, a system of numbering clauses and sentences in the Bible.

== See also ==
- Versed (poetry collection), a 2009 collection of poetry by Rae Armantrout
- Versus (disambiguation)
- Vers (disambiguation)
