= Variation Selectors Supplement =

Unicode block containing additional Variation Selectors

- Range: U+E0100..U+E01EF (240 code points)
- Plane: SSP
- Scripts: Inherited
- Assigned: 240 code points
- Unused: 0 reserved code points

Unicode Version History
- 4.0 (2003): 240 (+240)

Unicode documentation
- Code chart ∣ Web page

Variation Selectors Supplement is a Unicode block containing additional variation selectors beyond those found in the Variation Selectors block.

These combining characters are named variation selector-17 (for U+E0100) through to variation selector-256 (U+E01EF), abbreviated VS17 – VS256.

== Ideographic Variation Sequences ==
As of 3 August 2026, VS17 (U+E0100) to VS48 (U+E011F) are used in ideographic variation sequences in the Unicode Ideographic Variation Database (IVD). These selectors are known as Ideographic Variation Selectors (IVS). They are not listed in the list of standardized variation sequence, instead they are listed in another Ideographic Variation Database.

=== IVD collections ===
The following IVS collections are currently registered in the IVD:

Region	Name	Purpose	First registered	Last updated	Number of sequences	Chart
Japan	Adobe-Japan1	CID-keyed Japanese OpenType fonts. Defines at least one sequence for every Japanese kanji from the Adobe-Japan1 collection present in Unicode, even for those with only one glyph, both as future-proofing and to allow that (Japan-region) glyph to be uniquely referenced.	2007-12-14	2022-09-13	14,684	All Adobe sequences; Contrastive Adobe sequences
Japan	Hanyo-Denshi	Unicode characters corresponding to more than one glyph collected by the Han'yō Denshi program, a union of the character repertoires of the legacy kanji character sets used by multiple administrative systems in Japan (precursor to Moji Jōhō Kiban). Approximately 60% of the initial registration matches Adobe-Japan1 glyphs, but the existing Adobe-Japan1 variation sequences are not used for them.	2010-11-14	2012-03-02	13,045	All Han'yō Denshi sequences
Japan	Moji_Joho	Unicode characters corresponding to more than one entry in the Moji Jōhō Kiban, a database of kanji used for administrative purposes in Japan. Supersedes and deprecates the Hanyo-Denshi collection, from which it retains 9866 of the existing IVSes.	2014-05-16	2026-08-03	11,392	All Moji Jōhō sequences
Macau	MSARG	Macao Supplementary Character Set (MSCS)	2016-08-15	2020-11-06	154	All MSCS sequences
South Korea	KRName	Standard character variants permitted in personal names in South Korea	2017-12-12		36	All Korean name sequences
China	CAAPH	Variant forms required for digitization of intangible cultural heritage in databases and e-books by the Culture and Art Publishing House.	2025-07-14		198	All CAAPH sequences

=== Proposed IVD collections ===
As of 23 October 2025, there are no IVD collection submissions under review.

Similarly to the Moji Jōhō Kiban's role in Japan, the character repertoire of CNS 11643 (including draft revisions) is used for administrative purposes in Taiwan. In some cases, multiple of these correspond to a single Unicode character. Many of these cases are currently handled with mappings to the Supplementary Private Use Area. However, the Taipei Computer Association, which represents the interests of Taiwan in the Ideographic Research Group, has been evaluating the feasibility of registering an additional IVD collection in the future.

== Code chart ==
Variation Selectors Supplement^{[1]} Official Unicode Consortium code chart (PDF)
	0	1	2	3	4	5	6	7	8	9	A	B	C	D	E	F
U+E010x	VS; 17	VS; 18	VS; 19	VS; 20	VS; 21	VS; 22	VS; 23	VS; 24	VS; 25	VS; 26	VS; 27	VS; 28	VS; 29	VS; 30	VS; 31	VS; 32
U+E011x	VS; 33	VS; 34	VS; 35	VS; 36	VS; 37	VS; 38	VS; 39	VS; 40	VS; 41	VS; 42	VS; 43	VS; 44	VS; 45	VS; 46	VS; 47	VS; 48
U+E012x	VS; 49	VS; 50	VS; 51	VS; 52	VS; 53	VS; 54	VS; 55	VS; 56	VS; 57	VS; 58	VS; 59	VS; 60	VS; 61	VS; 62	VS; 63	VS; 64
U+E013x	VS; 65	VS; 66	VS; 67	VS; 68	VS; 69	VS; 70	VS; 71	VS; 72	VS; 73	VS; 74	VS; 75	VS; 76	VS; 77	VS; 78	VS; 79	VS; 80
U+E014x	VS; 81	VS; 82	VS; 83	VS; 84	VS; 85	VS; 86	VS; 87	VS; 88	VS; 89	VS; 90	VS; 91	VS; 92	VS; 93	VS; 94	VS; 95	VS; 96
U+E015x	VS; 97	VS; 98	VS; 99	VS; 100	VS; 101	VS; 102	VS; 103	VS; 104	VS; 105	VS; 106	VS; 107	VS; 108	VS; 109	VS; 110	VS; 111	VS; 112
U+E016x	VS; 113	VS; 114	VS; 115	VS; 116	VS; 117	VS; 118	VS; 119	VS; 120	VS; 121	VS; 122	VS; 123	VS; 124	VS; 125	VS; 126	VS; 127	VS; 128
U+E017x	VS; 129	VS; 130	VS; 131	VS; 132	VS; 133	VS; 134	VS; 135	VS; 136	VS; 137	VS; 138	VS; 139	VS; 140	VS; 141	VS; 142	VS; 143	VS; 144
U+E018x	VS; 145	VS; 146	VS; 147	VS; 148	VS; 149	VS; 150	VS; 151	VS; 152	VS; 153	VS; 154	VS; 155	VS; 156	VS; 157	VS; 158	VS; 159	VS; 160
U+E019x	VS; 161	VS; 162	VS; 163	VS; 164	VS; 165	VS; 166	VS; 167	VS; 168	VS; 169	VS; 170	VS; 171	VS; 172	VS; 173	VS; 174	VS; 175	VS; 176
U+E01Ax	VS; 177	VS; 178	VS; 179	VS; 180	VS; 181	VS; 182	VS; 183	VS; 184	VS; 185	VS; 186	VS; 187	VS; 188	VS; 189	VS; 190	VS; 191	VS; 192
U+E01Bx	VS; 193	VS; 194	VS; 195	VS; 196	VS; 197	VS; 198	VS; 199	VS; 200	VS; 201	VS; 202	VS; 203	VS; 204	VS; 205	VS; 206	VS; 207	VS; 208
U+E01Cx	VS; 209	VS; 210	VS; 211	VS; 212	VS; 213	VS; 214	VS; 215	VS; 216	VS; 217	VS; 218	VS; 219	VS; 220	VS; 221	VS; 222	VS; 223	VS; 224
U+E01Dx	VS; 225	VS; 226	VS; 227	VS; 228	VS; 229	VS; 230	VS; 231	VS; 232	VS; 233	VS; 234	VS; 235	VS; 236	VS; 237	VS; 238	VS; 239	VS; 240
U+E01Ex	VS; 241	VS; 242	VS; 243	VS; 244	VS; 245	VS; 246	VS; 247	VS; 248	VS; 249	VS; 250	VS; 251	VS; 252	VS; 253	VS; 254	VS; 255	VS; 256
Notes 1.As of Unicode version 17.0

== History ==
The following Unicode-related documents record the purpose and process of defining specific characters in the Variation Selectors Supplement block:

Version	Final code points (Note: Proposed code points and characters names may differ from final code points and names)	Count	L2 ID	WG2 ID	Document
4.0	U+E0100..E01EF	240	L2/97-260		Hiura, Hideki; Kobayashi, Tatsuo (1997-12-01), Plane 14 Variant Tag
4.0	U+E0100..E01EF	240	L2/98-039		Aliprand, Joan; Winkler, Arnold (1998-02-24), "2.D.4 Variant Tag Mechanism", Preliminary Minutes - UTC #74 & L2 #171, Mountain View, CA - December 5, 1997
4.0	U+E0100..E01EF	240	L2/98-277		Hiura, Hideki; Kobayashi, Tatsuo (1998-07-29), Plane 14 Variant tag
4.0	U+E0100..E01EF	240	L2/98-281R (pdf, html)		Aliprand, Joan (1998-07-31), "III.E.3 Variant Tagging (III.E.3)", Unconfirmed Minutes – UTC #77 & NCITS Subgroup L2 # 174 JOINT MEETING, Redmond, WA -- July 29-31, 1998
4.0	U+E0100..E01EF	240	L2/01-268		Freytag, Asmus (2001-06-27), Variant selector
4.0	U+E0100..E01EF	240	L2/01-309		Jenkins, John (2001-08-08), Variation selectors and Han
4.0	U+E0100..E01EF	240	L2/01-324R		Davis, Mark (2001-08-17), Variation Selectors [document has incorrect L2 ID number]
4.0	U+E0100..E01EF	240	L2/01-295R		Moore, Lisa (2001-11-06), "88-M5", Minutes from the UTC/L2 meeting #88
4.0	U+E0100..E01EF	240	L2/02-154	N2403	Umamaheswaran, V. S. (2002-04-22), "7.12", Draft minutes of WG 2 meeting 41, Hotel Phoenix, Singapore, 2001-10-15/19
4.0	U+E0100..E01EF	240	L2/02-372	N2453 (pdf, doc)	Umamaheswaran, V. S. (2002-10-30), "M42.21 (Amendment 1 to 10646-2)", Unconfirmed minutes of WG 2 meeting 42
