= VS1 =

VS1 may refer to:

- V_{S_{1}}, a V speed in aviation
- VS_{1}, a grade of Diamond clarity
- OS/VS1, an operating system
- U+FE00 ︀ VARIATION SELECTOR-1
