= VS =

VS, Vs or vs may refer to:

== Arts, media, and religion ==
=== Film ===
- Vs (film), or All Superheroes Must Die, a 2011 horror movie
- Ventana Sur, a Latin American film market

=== Television ===
- Vs. (game show), 1999
- "VS.", a 2009 episode (S4 E18; #75) of Prison Break

=== Music ===
- V.S., short for "volti subito" ("turn quickly"), an Italian musical term indicating a difficult page turn
- VS (group), an English R&B and pop group
- Vs. (Cookin' on 3 Burners album), 2017
- Vs. (Mission of Burma album), 1982
- Vs. (Pearl Jam album), 1993
- VS. (Other People's Heartache Pt. III), a 2014 mixtape in the Other People's Heartache series by Bastille
- "VS" (song), a 2006 single by misono
- "Vs. Lancer" and "Vs. Susie", tracks by Toby Fox, in Deltarune Chapter 1 OST, 2018

=== Gaming ===
- Vs. (video game), 1997
- Vs. System, a collectible card game
- Nintendo VS. System, an arcade system
- Vanu Sovereignty (VS), a faction in the PlanetSide series

=== Literature and Hinduism ===
- Vs. (magazine), a fashion and lifestyle magazine
- VS (manga), by Keiko Yamada
- Vajasaneyi-Samhita, text of the Yajurveda, in Hinduism
- Vikram Samvat, a Hindu calendar

== Computing ==
- Microsoft Visual Studio, an integrated development environment
- Variation Selectors (Unicode block)

== Engineering and transportation ==
- Visual servoing, in robot control
- V_{S}, stall speed or minimum steady flight speed for which an aircraft is still controllable
- Virgin Atlantic, IATA airline designator VS
- Holden Commodore (VS), a car

== Places ==
- Valais, Switzerland
- Vaslui County, Romania
- Villingen-Schwenningen, Germany
- Victoria School, an all-boys secondary school in Singapore

== Politics ==
- V. S. Achuthanandan (1923–2025), Communist Leader of the Opposition of the Indian state of Kerala
- Left Socialists (Venstresocialisterne), a Danish political party

== Other uses ==
- Vegetative state, a wakeful unconscious state
- Very Special, a classification of brandy
- Vertical slice, in project management

== See also ==
- Versus (disambiguation)
- V (disambiguation)
