= Versus =

Versus (Latin, 'against') may refer to:

== Film and television ==
- Versus (2000 film), a Japanese zombie film
- Versus (2016 film), a Russian sports drama film
- Versus (2019 film), a French thriller film
- Versus (TV channel), former name of NBCSN, an American sports channel
- "Versus", an episode of Ninjago
- "Versus", an episode of Super Café

== Music ==
- Versus, a trope in medieval music
- Versus (band), an American rock band

=== Albums ===
- Versus (Carl Craig album), 2017
- Versus (Diaura album), 2017
- Versus (Emarosa album), 2014
- Versus (Kings of Convenience album), 2001
- Versus (Little Ghost album), 2015
- Versus (Mikael Gabriel album), 2015
- Versus (Mr. Children album), 1993
- Versus (9ice album), 2011
- Versus (The Haunted album), 2008
- Versus, a 2017 album by Gloria Trevi & Alejandra Guzmán
- VersuS, a 2019 album by Vitaa with Slimane
- Versus (Usher EP), 2010
- Versus (Viviz EP), 2023

=== Songs ===
- "Versus", a 2015 single by Area 11
- "Versus", a song by Converge from the 2006 album No Heroes
- "Versus", a song by Jay-Z from the 2013 album Magna Carta Holy Grail
- "Versus", a song by Ladytron from the 2008 album Velocifero
- "Versus", a song by Memphis May Fire from the 2025 album Shapeshifter
- "Versus", a song by Moonspell from the 2012 album Alpha Noir/Omega White
- "Versus", a 2000 single by Tomcraft
- "Versus", a song by Within the Ruins from the 2010 album Invade
- "Versus", a song from the soundtrack of Danganronpa Another Episode: Ultra Despair Girls

== Other uses ==
- Versus (journal), an Italian semiotics journal
- Versus programming language
- Versus (Versace), the diffusion line of Italian fashion house Versace
- Legal cases are typically cited as "Smith versus Jones" (and written as Smith v Jones or longer Smith vs. Jones)
- Scientific diagrams can show a plot of something on the x-axis versus something else on the y-axis
- Versus (2022 manga)

== See also ==
- Verses (disambiguation)
- VS (disambiguation)
- V (disambiguation)
- Case citation, used by legal professionals to identify court case decisions
- Mashup (music)
- Comparative advertising
- Verzuz, an American webcast show
