= CJK Unified Ideographs Extension A =

- Range: U+3400..U+4DBF (6,592 code points)
- Plane: BMP
- Scripts: Han
- Assigned: 6,592 code points
- Unused: 0 reserved code points

Unicode Version History
- 3.0 (1999): 6,582 (+6,582)
- 13.0 (2020): 6,592 (+10)

Unicode documentation
- Code chart ∣ Web page
- Note: Range used for Hangul syllables prior to Unicode 2.0 (see Hangul (obsolete Unicode block)).; Historic single-glyph (Unicode 4.0) code chart

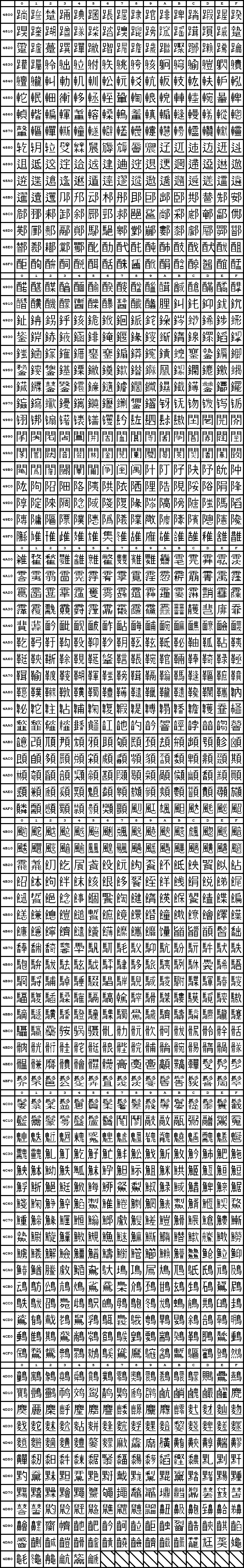
Graphical representation of the CJK Unified Ideographs Extension A Unicode block

CJK Unified Ideographs Extension A is a Unicode block containing rare Han ideographs submitted to the Ideographic Research Group between 1992 and 1998, plus ten ideographs added in Unicode 13.0 which had previously been mistakenly unified with others.

The block has dozens of variation sequences defined for standardized variants.

It also has thousands of ideographic variation sequences registered in the Unicode Ideographic Variation Database (IVD). These sequences specify the desired glyph variant for a given Unicode character.

== Known issues ==
- U+439B 䎛 CJK UNIFIED IDEOGRAPH-439B is an exact duplicate of U+3588 㖈 CJK UNIFIED IDEOGRAPH-3588.
- U+39B3 㦳 CJK UNIFIED IDEOGRAPH-39B3 is an exact duplicate of U+363D 㘽 CJK UNIFIED IDEOGRAPH-363D.

== Block ==
CJK Unified Ideographs Extension A^{[1]} Official Unicode Consortium code chart (PDF)
	0	1	2	3	4	5	6	7	8	9	A	B	C	D	E	F
U+340x	㐀	㐁	㐂	㐃	㐄	㐅	㐆	㐇	㐈	㐉	㐊	㐋	㐌	㐍	㐎	㐏
U+341x	㐐	㐑	㐒	㐓	㐔	㐕	㐖	㐗	㐘	㐙	㐚	㐛	㐜	㐝	㐞	㐟
U+342x	㐠	㐡	㐢	㐣	㐤	㐥	㐦	㐧	㐨	㐩	㐪	㐫	㐬	㐭	㐮	㐯
U+343x	㐰	㐱	㐲	㐳	㐴	㐵	㐶	㐷	㐸	㐹	㐺	㐻	㐼	㐽	㐾	㐿
U+344x	㑀	㑁	㑂	㑃	㑄	㑅	㑆	㑇	㑈	㑉	㑊	㑋	㑌	㑍	㑎	㑏
U+345x	㑐	㑑	㑒	㑓	㑔	㑕	㑖	㑗	㑘	㑙	㑚	㑛	㑜	㑝	㑞	㑟
U+346x	㑠	㑡	㑢	㑣	㑤	㑥	㑦	㑧	㑨	㑩	㑪	㑫	㑬	㑭	㑮	㑯
U+347x	㑰	㑱	㑲	㑳	㑴	㑵	㑶	㑷	㑸	㑹	㑺	㑻	㑼	㑽	㑾	㑿
U+348x	㒀	㒁	㒂	㒃	㒄	㒅	㒆	㒇	㒈	㒉	㒊	㒋	㒌	㒍	㒎	㒏
U+349x	㒐	㒑	㒒	㒓	㒔	㒕	㒖	㒗	㒘	㒙	㒚	㒛	㒜	㒝	㒞	㒟
U+34Ax	㒠	㒡	㒢	㒣	㒤	㒥	㒦	㒧	㒨	㒩	㒪	㒫	㒬	㒭	㒮	㒯
U+34Bx	㒰	㒱	㒲	㒳	㒴	㒵	㒶	㒷	㒸	㒹	㒺	㒻	㒼	㒽	㒾	㒿
U+34Cx	㓀	㓁	㓂	㓃	㓄	㓅	㓆	㓇	㓈	㓉	㓊	㓋	㓌	㓍	㓎	㓏
U+34Dx	㓐	㓑	㓒	㓓	㓔	㓕	㓖	㓗	㓘	㓙	㓚	㓛	㓜	㓝	㓞	㓟
U+34Ex	㓠	㓡	㓢	㓣	㓤	㓥	㓦	㓧	㓨	㓩	㓪	㓫	㓬	㓭	㓮	㓯
U+34Fx	㓰	㓱	㓲	㓳	㓴	㓵	㓶	㓷	㓸	㓹	㓺	㓻	㓼	㓽	㓾	㓿
U+350x	㔀	㔁	㔂	㔃	㔄	㔅	㔆	㔇	㔈	㔉	㔊	㔋	㔌	㔍	㔎	㔏
U+351x	㔐	㔑	㔒	㔓	㔔	㔕	㔖	㔗	㔘	㔙	㔚	㔛	㔜	㔝	㔞	㔟
U+352x	㔠	㔡	㔢	㔣	㔤	㔥	㔦	㔧	㔨	㔩	㔪	㔫	㔬	㔭	㔮	㔯
U+353x	㔰	㔱	㔲	㔳	㔴	㔵	㔶	㔷	㔸	㔹	㔺	㔻	㔼	㔽	㔾	㔿
U+354x	㕀	㕁	㕂	㕃	㕄	㕅	㕆	㕇	㕈	㕉	㕊	㕋	㕌	㕍	㕎	㕏
U+355x	㕐	㕑	㕒	㕓	㕔	㕕	㕖	㕗	㕘	㕙	㕚	㕛	㕜	㕝	㕞	㕟
U+356x	㕠	㕡	㕢	㕣	㕤	㕥	㕦	㕧	㕨	㕩	㕪	㕫	㕬	㕭	㕮	㕯
U+357x	㕰	㕱	㕲	㕳	㕴	㕵	㕶	㕷	㕸	㕹	㕺	㕻	㕼	㕽	㕾	㕿
U+358x	㖀	㖁	㖂	㖃	㖄	㖅	㖆	㖇	㖈	㖉	㖊	㖋	㖌	㖍	㖎	㖏
U+359x	㖐	㖑	㖒	㖓	㖔	㖕	㖖	㖗	㖘	㖙	㖚	㖛	㖜	㖝	㖞	㖟
U+35Ax	㖠	㖡	㖢	㖣	㖤	㖥	㖦	㖧	㖨	㖩	㖪	㖫	㖬	㖭	㖮	㖯
U+35Bx	㖰	㖱	㖲	㖳	㖴	㖵	㖶	㖷	㖸	㖹	㖺	㖻	㖼	㖽	㖾	㖿
U+35Cx	㗀	㗁	㗂	㗃	㗄	㗅	㗆	㗇	㗈	㗉	㗊	㗋	㗌	㗍	㗎	㗏
U+35Dx	㗐	㗑	㗒	㗓	㗔	㗕	㗖	㗗	㗘	㗙	㗚	㗛	㗜	㗝	㗞	㗟
U+35Ex	㗠	㗡	㗢	㗣	㗤	㗥	㗦	㗧	㗨	㗩	㗪	㗫	㗬	㗭	㗮	㗯
U+35Fx	㗰	㗱	㗲	㗳	㗴	㗵	㗶	㗷	㗸	㗹	㗺	㗻	㗼	㗽	㗾	㗿
U+360x	㘀	㘁	㘂	㘃	㘄	㘅	㘆	㘇	㘈	㘉	㘊	㘋	㘌	㘍	㘎	㘏
U+361x	㘐	㘑	㘒	㘓	㘔	㘕	㘖	㘗	㘘	㘙	㘚	㘛	㘜	㘝	㘞	㘟
U+362x	㘠	㘡	㘢	㘣	㘤	㘥	㘦	㘧	㘨	㘩	㘪	㘫	㘬	㘭	㘮	㘯
U+363x	㘰	㘱	㘲	㘳	㘴	㘵	㘶	㘷	㘸	㘹	㘺	㘻	㘼	㘽	㘾	㘿
U+364x	㙀	㙁	㙂	㙃	㙄	㙅	㙆	㙇	㙈	㙉	㙊	㙋	㙌	㙍	㙎	㙏
U+365x	㙐	㙑	㙒	㙓	㙔	㙕	㙖	㙗	㙘	㙙	㙚	㙛	㙜	㙝	㙞	㙟
U+366x	㙠	㙡	㙢	㙣	㙤	㙥	㙦	㙧	㙨	㙩	㙪	㙫	㙬	㙭	㙮	㙯
U+367x	㙰	㙱	㙲	㙳	㙴	㙵	㙶	㙷	㙸	㙹	㙺	㙻	㙼	㙽	㙾	㙿
U+368x	㚀	㚁	㚂	㚃	㚄	㚅	㚆	㚇	㚈	㚉	㚊	㚋	㚌	㚍	㚎	㚏
U+369x	㚐	㚑	㚒	㚓	㚔	㚕	㚖	㚗	㚘	㚙	㚚	㚛	㚜	㚝	㚞	㚟
U+36Ax	㚠	㚡	㚢	㚣	㚤	㚥	㚦	㚧	㚨	㚩	㚪	㚫	㚬	㚭	㚮	㚯
U+36Bx	㚰	㚱	㚲	㚳	㚴	㚵	㚶	㚷	㚸	㚹	㚺	㚻	㚼	㚽	㚾	㚿
U+36Cx	㛀	㛁	㛂	㛃	㛄	㛅	㛆	㛇	㛈	㛉	㛊	㛋	㛌	㛍	㛎	㛏
U+36Dx	㛐	㛑	㛒	㛓	㛔	㛕	㛖	㛗	㛘	㛙	㛚	㛛	㛜	㛝	㛞	㛟
U+36Ex	㛠	㛡	㛢	㛣	㛤	㛥	㛦	㛧	㛨	㛩	㛪	㛫	㛬	㛭	㛮	㛯
U+36Fx	㛰	㛱	㛲	㛳	㛴	㛵	㛶	㛷	㛸	㛹	㛺	㛻	㛼	㛽	㛾	㛿
U+370x	㜀	㜁	㜂	㜃	㜄	㜅	㜆	㜇	㜈	㜉	㜊	㜋	㜌	㜍	㜎	㜏
U+371x	㜐	㜑	㜒	㜓	㜔	㜕	㜖	㜗	㜘	㜙	㜚	㜛	㜜	㜝	㜞	㜟
U+372x	㜠	㜡	㜢	㜣	㜤	㜥	㜦	㜧	㜨	㜩	㜪	㜫	㜬	㜭	㜮	㜯
U+373x	㜰	㜱	㜲	㜳	㜴	㜵	㜶	㜷	㜸	㜹	㜺	㜻	㜼	㜽	㜾	㜿
U+374x	㝀	㝁	㝂	㝃	㝄	㝅	㝆	㝇	㝈	㝉	㝊	㝋	㝌	㝍	㝎	㝏
U+375x	㝐	㝑	㝒	㝓	㝔	㝕	㝖	㝗	㝘	㝙	㝚	㝛	㝜	㝝	㝞	㝟
U+376x	㝠	㝡	㝢	㝣	㝤	㝥	㝦	㝧	㝨	㝩	㝪	㝫	㝬	㝭	㝮	㝯
U+377x	㝰	㝱	㝲	㝳	㝴	㝵	㝶	㝷	㝸	㝹	㝺	㝻	㝼	㝽	㝾	㝿
U+378x	㞀	㞁	㞂	㞃	㞄	㞅	㞆	㞇	㞈	㞉	㞊	㞋	㞌	㞍	㞎	㞏
U+379x	㞐	㞑	㞒	㞓	㞔	㞕	㞖	㞗	㞘	㞙	㞚	㞛	㞜	㞝	㞞	㞟
U+37Ax	㞠	㞡	㞢	㞣	㞤	㞥	㞦	㞧	㞨	㞩	㞪	㞫	㞬	㞭	㞮	㞯
U+37Bx	㞰	㞱	㞲	㞳	㞴	㞵	㞶	㞷	㞸	㞹	㞺	㞻	㞼	㞽	㞾	㞿
U+37Cx	㟀	㟁	㟂	㟃	㟄	㟅	㟆	㟇	㟈	㟉	㟊	㟋	㟌	㟍	㟎	㟏
U+37Dx	㟐	㟑	㟒	㟓	㟔	㟕	㟖	㟗	㟘	㟙	㟚	㟛	㟜	㟝	㟞	㟟
U+37Ex	㟠	㟡	㟢	㟣	㟤	㟥	㟦	㟧	㟨	㟩	㟪	㟫	㟬	㟭	㟮	㟯
U+37Fx	㟰	㟱	㟲	㟳	㟴	㟵	㟶	㟷	㟸	㟹	㟺	㟻	㟼	㟽	㟾	㟿
U+380x	㠀	㠁	㠂	㠃	㠄	㠅	㠆	㠇	㠈	㠉	㠊	㠋	㠌	㠍	㠎	㠏
U+381x	㠐	㠑	㠒	㠓	㠔	㠕	㠖	㠗	㠘	㠙	㠚	㠛	㠜	㠝	㠞	㠟
U+382x	㠠	㠡	㠢	㠣	㠤	㠥	㠦	㠧	㠨	㠩	㠪	㠫	㠬	㠭	㠮	㠯
U+383x	㠰	㠱	㠲	㠳	㠴	㠵	㠶	㠷	㠸	㠹	㠺	㠻	㠼	㠽	㠾	㠿
U+384x	㡀	㡁	㡂	㡃	㡄	㡅	㡆	㡇	㡈	㡉	㡊	㡋	㡌	㡍	㡎	㡏
U+385x	㡐	㡑	㡒	㡓	㡔	㡕	㡖	㡗	㡘	㡙	㡚	㡛	㡜	㡝	㡞	㡟
U+386x	㡠	㡡	㡢	㡣	㡤	㡥	㡦	㡧	㡨	㡩	㡪	㡫	㡬	㡭	㡮	㡯
U+387x	㡰	㡱	㡲	㡳	㡴	㡵	㡶	㡷	㡸	㡹	㡺	㡻	㡼	㡽	㡾	㡿
U+388x	㢀	㢁	㢂	㢃	㢄	㢅	㢆	㢇	㢈	㢉	㢊	㢋	㢌	㢍	㢎	㢏
U+389x	㢐	㢑	㢒	㢓	㢔	㢕	㢖	㢗	㢘	㢙	㢚	㢛	㢜	㢝	㢞	㢟
U+38Ax	㢠	㢡	㢢	㢣	㢤	㢥	㢦	㢧	㢨	㢩	㢪	㢫	㢬	㢭	㢮	㢯
U+38Bx	㢰	㢱	㢲	㢳	㢴	㢵	㢶	㢷	㢸	㢹	㢺	㢻	㢼	㢽	㢾	㢿
U+38Cx	㣀	㣁	㣂	㣃	㣄	㣅	㣆	㣇	㣈	㣉	㣊	㣋	㣌	㣍	㣎	㣏
U+38Dx	㣐	㣑	㣒	㣓	㣔	㣕	㣖	㣗	㣘	㣙	㣚	㣛	㣜	㣝	㣞	㣟
U+38Ex	㣠	㣡	㣢	㣣	㣤	㣥	㣦	㣧	㣨	㣩	㣪	㣫	㣬	㣭	㣮	㣯
U+38Fx	㣰	㣱	㣲	㣳	㣴	㣵	㣶	㣷	㣸	㣹	㣺	㣻	㣼	㣽	㣾	㣿
U+390x	㤀	㤁	㤂	㤃	㤄	㤅	㤆	㤇	㤈	㤉	㤊	㤋	㤌	㤍	㤎	㤏
U+391x	㤐	㤑	㤒	㤓	㤔	㤕	㤖	㤗	㤘	㤙	㤚	㤛	㤜	㤝	㤞	㤟
U+392x	㤠	㤡	㤢	㤣	㤤	㤥	㤦	㤧	㤨	㤩	㤪	㤫	㤬	㤭	㤮	㤯
U+393x	㤰	㤱	㤲	㤳	㤴	㤵	㤶	㤷	㤸	㤹	㤺	㤻	㤼	㤽	㤾	㤿
U+394x	㥀	㥁	㥂	㥃	㥄	㥅	㥆	㥇	㥈	㥉	㥊	㥋	㥌	㥍	㥎	㥏
U+395x	㥐	㥑	㥒	㥓	㥔	㥕	㥖	㥗	㥘	㥙	㥚	㥛	㥜	㥝	㥞	㥟
U+396x	㥠	㥡	㥢	㥣	㥤	㥥	㥦	㥧	㥨	㥩	㥪	㥫	㥬	㥭	㥮	㥯
U+397x	㥰	㥱	㥲	㥳	㥴	㥵	㥶	㥷	㥸	㥹	㥺	㥻	㥼	㥽	㥾	㥿
U+398x	㦀	㦁	㦂	㦃	㦄	㦅	㦆	㦇	㦈	㦉	㦊	㦋	㦌	㦍	㦎	㦏
U+399x	㦐	㦑	㦒	㦓	㦔	㦕	㦖	㦗	㦘	㦙	㦚	㦛	㦜	㦝	㦞	㦟
U+39Ax	㦠	㦡	㦢	㦣	㦤	㦥	㦦	㦧	㦨	㦩	㦪	㦫	㦬	㦭	㦮	㦯
U+39Bx	㦰	㦱	㦲	㦳	㦴	㦵	㦶	㦷	㦸	㦹	㦺	㦻	㦼	㦽	㦾	㦿
U+39Cx	㧀	㧁	㧂	㧃	㧄	㧅	㧆	㧇	㧈	㧉	㧊	㧋	㧌	㧍	㧎	㧏
U+39Dx	㧐	㧑	㧒	㧓	㧔	㧕	㧖	㧗	㧘	㧙	㧚	㧛	㧜	㧝	㧞	㧟
U+39Ex	㧠	㧡	㧢	㧣	㧤	㧥	㧦	㧧	㧨	㧩	㧪	㧫	㧬	㧭	㧮	㧯
U+39Fx	㧰	㧱	㧲	㧳	㧴	㧵	㧶	㧷	㧸	㧹	㧺	㧻	㧼	㧽	㧾	㧿
U+3A0x	㨀	㨁	㨂	㨃	㨄	㨅	㨆	㨇	㨈	㨉	㨊	㨋	㨌	㨍	㨎	㨏
U+3A1x	㨐	㨑	㨒	㨓	㨔	㨕	㨖	㨗	㨘	㨙	㨚	㨛	㨜	㨝	㨞	㨟
U+3A2x	㨠	㨡	㨢	㨣	㨤	㨥	㨦	㨧	㨨	㨩	㨪	㨫	㨬	㨭	㨮	㨯
U+3A3x	㨰	㨱	㨲	㨳	㨴	㨵	㨶	㨷	㨸	㨹	㨺	㨻	㨼	㨽	㨾	㨿
U+3A4x	㩀	㩁	㩂	㩃	㩄	㩅	㩆	㩇	㩈	㩉	㩊	㩋	㩌	㩍	㩎	㩏
U+3A5x	㩐	㩑	㩒	㩓	㩔	㩕	㩖	㩗	㩘	㩙	㩚	㩛	㩜	㩝	㩞	㩟
U+3A6x	㩠	㩡	㩢	㩣	㩤	㩥	㩦	㩧	㩨	㩩	㩪	㩫	㩬	㩭	㩮	㩯
U+3A7x	㩰	㩱	㩲	㩳	㩴	㩵	㩶	㩷	㩸	㩹	㩺	㩻	㩼	㩽	㩾	㩿
U+3A8x	㪀	㪁	㪂	㪃	㪄	㪅	㪆	㪇	㪈	㪉	㪊	㪋	㪌	㪍	㪎	㪏
U+3A9x	㪐	㪑	㪒	㪓	㪔	㪕	㪖	㪗	㪘	㪙	㪚	㪛	㪜	㪝	㪞	㪟
U+3AAx	㪠	㪡	㪢	㪣	㪤	㪥	㪦	㪧	㪨	㪩	㪪	㪫	㪬	㪭	㪮	㪯
U+3ABx	㪰	㪱	㪲	㪳	㪴	㪵	㪶	㪷	㪸	㪹	㪺	㪻	㪼	㪽	㪾	㪿
U+3ACx	㫀	㫁	㫂	㫃	㫄	㫅	㫆	㫇	㫈	㫉	㫊	㫋	㫌	㫍	㫎	㫏
U+3ADx	㫐	㫑	㫒	㫓	㫔	㫕	㫖	㫗	㫘	㫙	㫚	㫛	㫜	㫝	㫞	㫟
U+3AEx	㫠	㫡	㫢	㫣	㫤	㫥	㫦	㫧	㫨	㫩	㫪	㫫	㫬	㫭	㫮	㫯
U+3AFx	㫰	㫱	㫲	㫳	㫴	㫵	㫶	㫷	㫸	㫹	㫺	㫻	㫼	㫽	㫾	㫿
U+3B0x	㬀	㬁	㬂	㬃	㬄	㬅	㬆	㬇	㬈	㬉	㬊	㬋	㬌	㬍	㬎	㬏
U+3B1x	㬐	㬑	㬒	㬓	㬔	㬕	㬖	㬗	㬘	㬙	㬚	㬛	㬜	㬝	㬞	㬟
U+3B2x	㬠	㬡	㬢	㬣	㬤	㬥	㬦	㬧	㬨	㬩	㬪	㬫	㬬	㬭	㬮	㬯
U+3B3x	㬰	㬱	㬲	㬳	㬴	㬵	㬶	㬷	㬸	㬹	㬺	㬻	㬼	㬽	㬾	㬿
U+3B4x	㭀	㭁	㭂	㭃	㭄	㭅	㭆	㭇	㭈	㭉	㭊	㭋	㭌	㭍	㭎	㭏
U+3B5x	㭐	㭑	㭒	㭓	㭔	㭕	㭖	㭗	㭘	㭙	㭚	㭛	㭜	㭝	㭞	㭟
U+3B6x	㭠	㭡	㭢	㭣	㭤	㭥	㭦	㭧	㭨	㭩	㭪	㭫	㭬	㭭	㭮	㭯
U+3B7x	㭰	㭱	㭲	㭳	㭴	㭵	㭶	㭷	㭸	㭹	㭺	㭻	㭼	㭽	㭾	㭿
U+3B8x	㮀	㮁	㮂	㮃	㮄	㮅	㮆	㮇	㮈	㮉	㮊	㮋	㮌	㮍	㮎	㮏
U+3B9x	㮐	㮑	㮒	㮓	㮔	㮕	㮖	㮗	㮘	㮙	㮚	㮛	㮜	㮝	㮞	㮟
U+3BAx	㮠	㮡	㮢	㮣	㮤	㮥	㮦	㮧	㮨	㮩	㮪	㮫	㮬	㮭	㮮	㮯
U+3BBx	㮰	㮱	㮲	㮳	㮴	㮵	㮶	㮷	㮸	㮹	㮺	㮻	㮼	㮽	㮾	㮿
U+3BCx	㯀	㯁	㯂	㯃	㯄	㯅	㯆	㯇	㯈	㯉	㯊	㯋	㯌	㯍	㯎	㯏
U+3BDx	㯐	㯑	㯒	㯓	㯔	㯕	㯖	㯗	㯘	㯙	㯚	㯛	㯜	㯝	㯞	㯟
U+3BEx	㯠	㯡	㯢	㯣	㯤	㯥	㯦	㯧	㯨	㯩	㯪	㯫	㯬	㯭	㯮	㯯
U+3BFx	㯰	㯱	㯲	㯳	㯴	㯵	㯶	㯷	㯸	㯹	㯺	㯻	㯼	㯽	㯾	㯿
U+3C0x	㰀	㰁	㰂	㰃	㰄	㰅	㰆	㰇	㰈	㰉	㰊	㰋	㰌	㰍	㰎	㰏
U+3C1x	㰐	㰑	㰒	㰓	㰔	㰕	㰖	㰗	㰘	㰙	㰚	㰛	㰜	㰝	㰞	㰟
U+3C2x	㰠	㰡	㰢	㰣	㰤	㰥	㰦	㰧	㰨	㰩	㰪	㰫	㰬	㰭	㰮	㰯
U+3C3x	㰰	㰱	㰲	㰳	㰴	㰵	㰶	㰷	㰸	㰹	㰺	㰻	㰼	㰽	㰾	㰿
U+3C4x	㱀	㱁	㱂	㱃	㱄	㱅	㱆	㱇	㱈	㱉	㱊	㱋	㱌	㱍	㱎	㱏
U+3C5x	㱐	㱑	㱒	㱓	㱔	㱕	㱖	㱗	㱘	㱙	㱚	㱛	㱜	㱝	㱞	㱟
U+3C6x	㱠	㱡	㱢	㱣	㱤	㱥	㱦	㱧	㱨	㱩	㱪	㱫	㱬	㱭	㱮	㱯
U+3C7x	㱰	㱱	㱲	㱳	㱴	㱵	㱶	㱷	㱸	㱹	㱺	㱻	㱼	㱽	㱾	㱿
U+3C8x	㲀	㲁	㲂	㲃	㲄	㲅	㲆	㲇	㲈	㲉	㲊	㲋	㲌	㲍	㲎	㲏
U+3C9x	㲐	㲑	㲒	㲓	㲔	㲕	㲖	㲗	㲘	㲙	㲚	㲛	㲜	㲝	㲞	㲟
U+3CAx	㲠	㲡	㲢	㲣	㲤	㲥	㲦	㲧	㲨	㲩	㲪	㲫	㲬	㲭	㲮	㲯
U+3CBx	㲰	㲱	㲲	㲳	㲴	㲵	㲶	㲷	㲸	㲹	㲺	㲻	㲼	㲽	㲾	㲿
U+3CCx	㳀	㳁	㳂	㳃	㳄	㳅	㳆	㳇	㳈	㳉	㳊	㳋	㳌	㳍	㳎	㳏
U+3CDx	㳐	㳑	㳒	㳓	㳔	㳕	㳖	㳗	㳘	㳙	㳚	㳛	㳜	㳝	㳞	㳟
U+3CEx	㳠	㳡	㳢	㳣	㳤	㳥	㳦	㳧	㳨	㳩	㳪	㳫	㳬	㳭	㳮	㳯
U+3CFx	㳰	㳱	㳲	㳳	㳴	㳵	㳶	㳷	㳸	㳹	㳺	㳻	㳼	㳽	㳾	㳿
U+3D0x	㴀	㴁	㴂	㴃	㴄	㴅	㴆	㴇	㴈	㴉	㴊	㴋	㴌	㴍	㴎	㴏
U+3D1x	㴐	㴑	㴒	㴓	㴔	㴕	㴖	㴗	㴘	㴙	㴚	㴛	㴜	㴝	㴞	㴟
U+3D2x	㴠	㴡	㴢	㴣	㴤	㴥	㴦	㴧	㴨	㴩	㴪	㴫	㴬	㴭	㴮	㴯
U+3D3x	㴰	㴱	㴲	㴳	㴴	㴵	㴶	㴷	㴸	㴹	㴺	㴻	㴼	㴽	㴾	㴿
U+3D4x	㵀	㵁	㵂	㵃	㵄	㵅	㵆	㵇	㵈	㵉	㵊	㵋	㵌	㵍	㵎	㵏
U+3D5x	㵐	㵑	㵒	㵓	㵔	㵕	㵖	㵗	㵘	㵙	㵚	㵛	㵜	㵝	㵞	㵟
U+3D6x	㵠	㵡	㵢	㵣	㵤	㵥	㵦	㵧	㵨	㵩	㵪	㵫	㵬	㵭	㵮	㵯
U+3D7x	㵰	㵱	㵲	㵳	㵴	㵵	㵶	㵷	㵸	㵹	㵺	㵻	㵼	㵽	㵾	㵿
U+3D8x	㶀	㶁	㶂	㶃	㶄	㶅	㶆	㶇	㶈	㶉	㶊	㶋	㶌	㶍	㶎	㶏
U+3D9x	㶐	㶑	㶒	㶓	㶔	㶕	㶖	㶗	㶘	㶙	㶚	㶛	㶜	㶝	㶞	㶟
U+3DAx	㶠	㶡	㶢	㶣	㶤	㶥	㶦	㶧	㶨	㶩	㶪	㶫	㶬	㶭	㶮	㶯
U+3DBx	㶰	㶱	㶲	㶳	㶴	㶵	㶶	㶷	㶸	㶹	㶺	㶻	㶼	㶽	㶾	㶿
U+3DCx	㷀	㷁	㷂	㷃	㷄	㷅	㷆	㷇	㷈	㷉	㷊	㷋	㷌	㷍	㷎	㷏
U+3DDx	㷐	㷑	㷒	㷓	㷔	㷕	㷖	㷗	㷘	㷙	㷚	㷛	㷜	㷝	㷞	㷟
U+3DEx	㷠	㷡	㷢	㷣	㷤	㷥	㷦	㷧	㷨	㷩	㷪	㷫	㷬	㷭	㷮	㷯
U+3DFx	㷰	㷱	㷲	㷳	㷴	㷵	㷶	㷷	㷸	㷹	㷺	㷻	㷼	㷽	㷾	㷿
U+3E0x	㸀	㸁	㸂	㸃	㸄	㸅	㸆	㸇	㸈	㸉	㸊	㸋	㸌	㸍	㸎	㸏
U+3E1x	㸐	㸑	㸒	㸓	㸔	㸕	㸖	㸗	㸘	㸙	㸚	㸛	㸜	㸝	㸞	㸟
U+3E2x	㸠	㸡	㸢	㸣	㸤	㸥	㸦	㸧	㸨	㸩	㸪	㸫	㸬	㸭	㸮	㸯
U+3E3x	㸰	㸱	㸲	㸳	㸴	㸵	㸶	㸷	㸸	㸹	㸺	㸻	㸼	㸽	㸾	㸿
U+3E4x	㹀	㹁	㹂	㹃	㹄	㹅	㹆	㹇	㹈	㹉	㹊	㹋	㹌	㹍	㹎	㹏
U+3E5x	㹐	㹑	㹒	㹓	㹔	㹕	㹖	㹗	㹘	㹙	㹚	㹛	㹜	㹝	㹞	㹟
U+3E6x	㹠	㹡	㹢	㹣	㹤	㹥	㹦	㹧	㹨	㹩	㹪	㹫	㹬	㹭	㹮	㹯
U+3E7x	㹰	㹱	㹲	㹳	㹴	㹵	㹶	㹷	㹸	㹹	㹺	㹻	㹼	㹽	㹾	㹿
U+3E8x	㺀	㺁	㺂	㺃	㺄	㺅	㺆	㺇	㺈	㺉	㺊	㺋	㺌	㺍	㺎	㺏
U+3E9x	㺐	㺑	㺒	㺓	㺔	㺕	㺖	㺗	㺘	㺙	㺚	㺛	㺜	㺝	㺞	㺟
U+3EAx	㺠	㺡	㺢	㺣	㺤	㺥	㺦	㺧	㺨	㺩	㺪	㺫	㺬	㺭	㺮	㺯
U+3EBx	㺰	㺱	㺲	㺳	㺴	㺵	㺶	㺷	㺸	㺹	㺺	㺻	㺼	㺽	㺾	㺿
U+3ECx	㻀	㻁	㻂	㻃	㻄	㻅	㻆	㻇	㻈	㻉	㻊	㻋	㻌	㻍	㻎	㻏
U+3EDx	㻐	㻑	㻒	㻓	㻔	㻕	㻖	㻗	㻘	㻙	㻚	㻛	㻜	㻝	㻞	㻟
U+3EEx	㻠	㻡	㻢	㻣	㻤	㻥	㻦	㻧	㻨	㻩	㻪	㻫	㻬	㻭	㻮	㻯
U+3EFx	㻰	㻱	㻲	㻳	㻴	㻵	㻶	㻷	㻸	㻹	㻺	㻻	㻼	㻽	㻾	㻿
U+3F0x	㼀	㼁	㼂	㼃	㼄	㼅	㼆	㼇	㼈	㼉	㼊	㼋	㼌	㼍	㼎	㼏
U+3F1x	㼐	㼑	㼒	㼓	㼔	㼕	㼖	㼗	㼘	㼙	㼚	㼛	㼜	㼝	㼞	㼟
U+3F2x	㼠	㼡	㼢	㼣	㼤	㼥	㼦	㼧	㼨	㼩	㼪	㼫	㼬	㼭	㼮	㼯
U+3F3x	㼰	㼱	㼲	㼳	㼴	㼵	㼶	㼷	㼸	㼹	㼺	㼻	㼼	㼽	㼾	㼿
U+3F4x	㽀	㽁	㽂	㽃	㽄	㽅	㽆	㽇	㽈	㽉	㽊	㽋	㽌	㽍	㽎	㽏
U+3F5x	㽐	㽑	㽒	㽓	㽔	㽕	㽖	㽗	㽘	㽙	㽚	㽛	㽜	㽝	㽞	㽟
U+3F6x	㽠	㽡	㽢	㽣	㽤	㽥	㽦	㽧	㽨	㽩	㽪	㽫	㽬	㽭	㽮	㽯
U+3F7x	㽰	㽱	㽲	㽳	㽴	㽵	㽶	㽷	㽸	㽹	㽺	㽻	㽼	㽽	㽾	㽿
U+3F8x	㾀	㾁	㾂	㾃	㾄	㾅	㾆	㾇	㾈	㾉	㾊	㾋	㾌	㾍	㾎	㾏
U+3F9x	㾐	㾑	㾒	㾓	㾔	㾕	㾖	㾗	㾘	㾙	㾚	㾛	㾜	㾝	㾞	㾟
U+3FAx	㾠	㾡	㾢	㾣	㾤	㾥	㾦	㾧	㾨	㾩	㾪	㾫	㾬	㾭	㾮	㾯
U+3FBx	㾰	㾱	㾲	㾳	㾴	㾵	㾶	㾷	㾸	㾹	㾺	㾻	㾼	㾽	㾾	㾿
U+3FCx	㿀	㿁	㿂	㿃	㿄	㿅	㿆	㿇	㿈	㿉	㿊	㿋	㿌	㿍	㿎	㿏
U+3FDx	㿐	㿑	㿒	㿓	㿔	㿕	㿖	㿗	㿘	㿙	㿚	㿛	㿜	㿝	㿞	㿟
U+3FEx	㿠	㿡	㿢	㿣	㿤	㿥	㿦	㿧	㿨	㿩	㿪	㿫	㿬	㿭	㿮	㿯
U+3FFx	㿰	㿱	㿲	㿳	㿴	㿵	㿶	㿷	㿸	㿹	㿺	㿻	㿼	㿽	㿾	㿿
U+400x	䀀	䀁	䀂	䀃	䀄	䀅	䀆	䀇	䀈	䀉	䀊	䀋	䀌	䀍	䀎	䀏
U+401x	䀐	䀑	䀒	䀓	䀔	䀕	䀖	䀗	䀘	䀙	䀚	䀛	䀜	䀝	䀞	䀟
U+402x	䀠	䀡	䀢	䀣	䀤	䀥	䀦	䀧	䀨	䀩	䀪	䀫	䀬	䀭	䀮	䀯
U+403x	䀰	䀱	䀲	䀳	䀴	䀵	䀶	䀷	䀸	䀹	䀺	䀻	䀼	䀽	䀾	䀿
U+404x	䁀	䁁	䁂	䁃	䁄	䁅	䁆	䁇	䁈	䁉	䁊	䁋	䁌	䁍	䁎	䁏
U+405x	䁐	䁑	䁒	䁓	䁔	䁕	䁖	䁗	䁘	䁙	䁚	䁛	䁜	䁝	䁞	䁟
U+406x	䁠	䁡	䁢	䁣	䁤	䁥	䁦	䁧	䁨	䁩	䁪	䁫	䁬	䁭	䁮	䁯
U+407x	䁰	䁱	䁲	䁳	䁴	䁵	䁶	䁷	䁸	䁹	䁺	䁻	䁼	䁽	䁾	䁿
U+408x	䂀	䂁	䂂	䂃	䂄	䂅	䂆	䂇	䂈	䂉	䂊	䂋	䂌	䂍	䂎	䂏
U+409x	䂐	䂑	䂒	䂓	䂔	䂕	䂖	䂗	䂘	䂙	䂚	䂛	䂜	䂝	䂞	䂟
U+40Ax	䂠	䂡	䂢	䂣	䂤	䂥	䂦	䂧	䂨	䂩	䂪	䂫	䂬	䂭	䂮	䂯
U+40Bx	䂰	䂱	䂲	䂳	䂴	䂵	䂶	䂷	䂸	䂹	䂺	䂻	䂼	䂽	䂾	䂿
U+40Cx	䃀	䃁	䃂	䃃	䃄	䃅	䃆	䃇	䃈	䃉	䃊	䃋	䃌	䃍	䃎	䃏
U+40Dx	䃐	䃑	䃒	䃓	䃔	䃕	䃖	䃗	䃘	䃙	䃚	䃛	䃜	䃝	䃞	䃟
U+40Ex	䃠	䃡	䃢	䃣	䃤	䃥	䃦	䃧	䃨	䃩	䃪	䃫	䃬	䃭	䃮	䃯
U+40Fx	䃰	䃱	䃲	䃳	䃴	䃵	䃶	䃷	䃸	䃹	䃺	䃻	䃼	䃽	䃾	䃿
U+410x	䄀	䄁	䄂	䄃	䄄	䄅	䄆	䄇	䄈	䄉	䄊	䄋	䄌	䄍	䄎	䄏
U+411x	䄐	䄑	䄒	䄓	䄔	䄕	䄖	䄗	䄘	䄙	䄚	䄛	䄜	䄝	䄞	䄟
U+412x	䄠	䄡	䄢	䄣	䄤	䄥	䄦	䄧	䄨	䄩	䄪	䄫	䄬	䄭	䄮	䄯
U+413x	䄰	䄱	䄲	䄳	䄴	䄵	䄶	䄷	䄸	䄹	䄺	䄻	䄼	䄽	䄾	䄿
U+414x	䅀	䅁	䅂	䅃	䅄	䅅	䅆	䅇	䅈	䅉	䅊	䅋	䅌	䅍	䅎	䅏
U+415x	䅐	䅑	䅒	䅓	䅔	䅕	䅖	䅗	䅘	䅙	䅚	䅛	䅜	䅝	䅞	䅟
U+416x	䅠	䅡	䅢	䅣	䅤	䅥	䅦	䅧	䅨	䅩	䅪	䅫	䅬	䅭	䅮	䅯
U+417x	䅰	䅱	䅲	䅳	䅴	䅵	䅶	䅷	䅸	䅹	䅺	䅻	䅼	䅽	䅾	䅿
U+418x	䆀	䆁	䆂	䆃	䆄	䆅	䆆	䆇	䆈	䆉	䆊	䆋	䆌	䆍	䆎	䆏
U+419x	䆐	䆑	䆒	䆓	䆔	䆕	䆖	䆗	䆘	䆙	䆚	䆛	䆜	䆝	䆞	䆟
U+41Ax	䆠	䆡	䆢	䆣	䆤	䆥	䆦	䆧	䆨	䆩	䆪	䆫	䆬	䆭	䆮	䆯
U+41Bx	䆰	䆱	䆲	䆳	䆴	䆵	䆶	䆷	䆸	䆹	䆺	䆻	䆼	䆽	䆾	䆿
U+41Cx	䇀	䇁	䇂	䇃	䇄	䇅	䇆	䇇	䇈	䇉	䇊	䇋	䇌	䇍	䇎	䇏
U+41Dx	䇐	䇑	䇒	䇓	䇔	䇕	䇖	䇗	䇘	䇙	䇚	䇛	䇜	䇝	䇞	䇟
U+41Ex	䇠	䇡	䇢	䇣	䇤	䇥	䇦	䇧	䇨	䇩	䇪	䇫	䇬	䇭	䇮	䇯
U+41Fx	䇰	䇱	䇲	䇳	䇴	䇵	䇶	䇷	䇸	䇹	䇺	䇻	䇼	䇽	䇾	䇿
U+420x	䈀	䈁	䈂	䈃	䈄	䈅	䈆	䈇	䈈	䈉	䈊	䈋	䈌	䈍	䈎	䈏
U+421x	䈐	䈑	䈒	䈓	䈔	䈕	䈖	䈗	䈘	䈙	䈚	䈛	䈜	䈝	䈞	䈟
U+422x	䈠	䈡	䈢	䈣	䈤	䈥	䈦	䈧	䈨	䈩	䈪	䈫	䈬	䈭	䈮	䈯
U+423x	䈰	䈱	䈲	䈳	䈴	䈵	䈶	䈷	䈸	䈹	䈺	䈻	䈼	䈽	䈾	䈿
U+424x	䉀	䉁	䉂	䉃	䉄	䉅	䉆	䉇	䉈	䉉	䉊	䉋	䉌	䉍	䉎	䉏
U+425x	䉐	䉑	䉒	䉓	䉔	䉕	䉖	䉗	䉘	䉙	䉚	䉛	䉜	䉝	䉞	䉟
U+426x	䉠	䉡	䉢	䉣	䉤	䉥	䉦	䉧	䉨	䉩	䉪	䉫	䉬	䉭	䉮	䉯
U+427x	䉰	䉱	䉲	䉳	䉴	䉵	䉶	䉷	䉸	䉹	䉺	䉻	䉼	䉽	䉾	䉿
U+428x	䊀	䊁	䊂	䊃	䊄	䊅	䊆	䊇	䊈	䊉	䊊	䊋	䊌	䊍	䊎	䊏
U+429x	䊐	䊑	䊒	䊓	䊔	䊕	䊖	䊗	䊘	䊙	䊚	䊛	䊜	䊝	䊞	䊟
U+42Ax	䊠	䊡	䊢	䊣	䊤	䊥	䊦	䊧	䊨	䊩	䊪	䊫	䊬	䊭	䊮	䊯
U+42Bx	䊰	䊱	䊲	䊳	䊴	䊵	䊶	䊷	䊸	䊹	䊺	䊻	䊼	䊽	䊾	䊿
U+42Cx	䋀	䋁	䋂	䋃	䋄	䋅	䋆	䋇	䋈	䋉	䋊	䋋	䋌	䋍	䋎	䋏
U+42Dx	䋐	䋑	䋒	䋓	䋔	䋕	䋖	䋗	䋘	䋙	䋚	䋛	䋜	䋝	䋞	䋟
U+42Ex	䋠	䋡	䋢	䋣	䋤	䋥	䋦	䋧	䋨	䋩	䋪	䋫	䋬	䋭	䋮	䋯
U+42Fx	䋰	䋱	䋲	䋳	䋴	䋵	䋶	䋷	䋸	䋹	䋺	䋻	䋼	䋽	䋾	䋿
U+430x	䌀	䌁	䌂	䌃	䌄	䌅	䌆	䌇	䌈	䌉	䌊	䌋	䌌	䌍	䌎	䌏
U+431x	䌐	䌑	䌒	䌓	䌔	䌕	䌖	䌗	䌘	䌙	䌚	䌛	䌜	䌝	䌞	䌟
U+432x	䌠	䌡	䌢	䌣	䌤	䌥	䌦	䌧	䌨	䌩	䌪	䌫	䌬	䌭	䌮	䌯
U+433x	䌰	䌱	䌲	䌳	䌴	䌵	䌶	䌷	䌸	䌹	䌺	䌻	䌼	䌽	䌾	䌿
U+434x	䍀	䍁	䍂	䍃	䍄	䍅	䍆	䍇	䍈	䍉	䍊	䍋	䍌	䍍	䍎	䍏
U+435x	䍐	䍑	䍒	䍓	䍔	䍕	䍖	䍗	䍘	䍙	䍚	䍛	䍜	䍝	䍞	䍟
U+436x	䍠	䍡	䍢	䍣	䍤	䍥	䍦	䍧	䍨	䍩	䍪	䍫	䍬	䍭	䍮	䍯
U+437x	䍰	䍱	䍲	䍳	䍴	䍵	䍶	䍷	䍸	䍹	䍺	䍻	䍼	䍽	䍾	䍿
U+438x	䎀	䎁	䎂	䎃	䎄	䎅	䎆	䎇	䎈	䎉	䎊	䎋	䎌	䎍	䎎	䎏
U+439x	䎐	䎑	䎒	䎓	䎔	䎕	䎖	䎗	䎘	䎙	䎚	䎛	䎜	䎝	䎞	䎟
U+43Ax	䎠	䎡	䎢	䎣	䎤	䎥	䎦	䎧	䎨	䎩	䎪	䎫	䎬	䎭	䎮	䎯
U+43Bx	䎰	䎱	䎲	䎳	䎴	䎵	䎶	䎷	䎸	䎹	䎺	䎻	䎼	䎽	䎾	䎿
U+43Cx	䏀	䏁	䏂	䏃	䏄	䏅	䏆	䏇	䏈	䏉	䏊	䏋	䏌	䏍	䏎	䏏
U+43Dx	䏐	䏑	䏒	䏓	䏔	䏕	䏖	䏗	䏘	䏙	䏚	䏛	䏜	䏝	䏞	䏟
U+43Ex	䏠	䏡	䏢	䏣	䏤	䏥	䏦	䏧	䏨	䏩	䏪	䏫	䏬	䏭	䏮	䏯
U+43Fx	䏰	䏱	䏲	䏳	䏴	䏵	䏶	䏷	䏸	䏹	䏺	䏻	䏼	䏽	䏾	䏿
U+440x	䐀	䐁	䐂	䐃	䐄	䐅	䐆	䐇	䐈	䐉	䐊	䐋	䐌	䐍	䐎	䐏
U+441x	䐐	䐑	䐒	䐓	䐔	䐕	䐖	䐗	䐘	䐙	䐚	䐛	䐜	䐝	䐞	䐟
U+442x	䐠	䐡	䐢	䐣	䐤	䐥	䐦	䐧	䐨	䐩	䐪	䐫	䐬	䐭	䐮	䐯
U+443x	䐰	䐱	䐲	䐳	䐴	䐵	䐶	䐷	䐸	䐹	䐺	䐻	䐼	䐽	䐾	䐿
U+444x	䑀	䑁	䑂	䑃	䑄	䑅	䑆	䑇	䑈	䑉	䑊	䑋	䑌	䑍	䑎	䑏
U+445x	䑐	䑑	䑒	䑓	䑔	䑕	䑖	䑗	䑘	䑙	䑚	䑛	䑜	䑝	䑞	䑟
U+446x	䑠	䑡	䑢	䑣	䑤	䑥	䑦	䑧	䑨	䑩	䑪	䑫	䑬	䑭	䑮	䑯
U+447x	䑰	䑱	䑲	䑳	䑴	䑵	䑶	䑷	䑸	䑹	䑺	䑻	䑼	䑽	䑾	䑿
U+448x	䒀	䒁	䒂	䒃	䒄	䒅	䒆	䒇	䒈	䒉	䒊	䒋	䒌	䒍	䒎	䒏
U+449x	䒐	䒑	䒒	䒓	䒔	䒕	䒖	䒗	䒘	䒙	䒚	䒛	䒜	䒝	䒞	䒟
U+44Ax	䒠	䒡	䒢	䒣	䒤	䒥	䒦	䒧	䒨	䒩	䒪	䒫	䒬	䒭	䒮	䒯
U+44Bx	䒰	䒱	䒲	䒳	䒴	䒵	䒶	䒷	䒸	䒹	䒺	䒻	䒼	䒽	䒾	䒿
U+44Cx	䓀	䓁	䓂	䓃	䓄	䓅	䓆	䓇	䓈	䓉	䓊	䓋	䓌	䓍	䓎	䓏
U+44Dx	䓐	䓑	䓒	䓓	䓔	䓕	䓖	䓗	䓘	䓙	䓚	䓛	䓜	䓝	䓞	䓟
U+44Ex	䓠	䓡	䓢	䓣	䓤	䓥	䓦	䓧	䓨	䓩	䓪	䓫	䓬	䓭	䓮	䓯
U+44Fx	䓰	䓱	䓲	䓳	䓴	䓵	䓶	䓷	䓸	䓹	䓺	䓻	䓼	䓽	䓾	䓿
U+450x	䔀	䔁	䔂	䔃	䔄	䔅	䔆	䔇	䔈	䔉	䔊	䔋	䔌	䔍	䔎	䔏
U+451x	䔐	䔑	䔒	䔓	䔔	䔕	䔖	䔗	䔘	䔙	䔚	䔛	䔜	䔝	䔞	䔟
U+452x	䔠	䔡	䔢	䔣	䔤	䔥	䔦	䔧	䔨	䔩	䔪	䔫	䔬	䔭	䔮	䔯
U+453x	䔰	䔱	䔲	䔳	䔴	䔵	䔶	䔷	䔸	䔹	䔺	䔻	䔼	䔽	䔾	䔿
U+454x	䕀	䕁	䕂	䕃	䕄	䕅	䕆	䕇	䕈	䕉	䕊	䕋	䕌	䕍	䕎	䕏
U+455x	䕐	䕑	䕒	䕓	䕔	䕕	䕖	䕗	䕘	䕙	䕚	䕛	䕜	䕝	䕞	䕟
U+456x	䕠	䕡	䕢	䕣	䕤	䕥	䕦	䕧	䕨	䕩	䕪	䕫	䕬	䕭	䕮	䕯
U+457x	䕰	䕱	䕲	䕳	䕴	䕵	䕶	䕷	䕸	䕹	䕺	䕻	䕼	䕽	䕾	䕿
U+458x	䖀	䖁	䖂	䖃	䖄	䖅	䖆	䖇	䖈	䖉	䖊	䖋	䖌	䖍	䖎	䖏
U+459x	䖐	䖑	䖒	䖓	䖔	䖕	䖖	䖗	䖘	䖙	䖚	䖛	䖜	䖝	䖞	䖟
U+45Ax	䖠	䖡	䖢	䖣	䖤	䖥	䖦	䖧	䖨	䖩	䖪	䖫	䖬	䖭	䖮	䖯
U+45Bx	䖰	䖱	䖲	䖳	䖴	䖵	䖶	䖷	䖸	䖹	䖺	䖻	䖼	䖽	䖾	䖿
U+45Cx	䗀	䗁	䗂	䗃	䗄	䗅	䗆	䗇	䗈	䗉	䗊	䗋	䗌	䗍	䗎	䗏
U+45Dx	䗐	䗑	䗒	䗓	䗔	䗕	䗖	䗗	䗘	䗙	䗚	䗛	䗜	䗝	䗞	䗟
U+45Ex	䗠	䗡	䗢	䗣	䗤	䗥	䗦	䗧	䗨	䗩	䗪	䗫	䗬	䗭	䗮	䗯
U+45Fx	䗰	䗱	䗲	䗳	䗴	䗵	䗶	䗷	䗸	䗹	䗺	䗻	䗼	䗽	䗾	䗿
U+460x	䘀	䘁	䘂	䘃	䘄	䘅	䘆	䘇	䘈	䘉	䘊	䘋	䘌	䘍	䘎	䘏
U+461x	䘐	䘑	䘒	䘓	䘔	䘕	䘖	䘗	䘘	䘙	䘚	䘛	䘜	䘝	䘞	䘟
U+462x	䘠	䘡	䘢	䘣	䘤	䘥	䘦	䘧	䘨	䘩	䘪	䘫	䘬	䘭	䘮	䘯
U+463x	䘰	䘱	䘲	䘳	䘴	䘵	䘶	䘷	䘸	䘹	䘺	䘻	䘼	䘽	䘾	䘿
U+464x	䙀	䙁	䙂	䙃	䙄	䙅	䙆	䙇	䙈	䙉	䙊	䙋	䙌	䙍	䙎	䙏
U+465x	䙐	䙑	䙒	䙓	䙔	䙕	䙖	䙗	䙘	䙙	䙚	䙛	䙜	䙝	䙞	䙟
U+466x	䙠	䙡	䙢	䙣	䙤	䙥	䙦	䙧	䙨	䙩	䙪	䙫	䙬	䙭	䙮	䙯
U+467x	䙰	䙱	䙲	䙳	䙴	䙵	䙶	䙷	䙸	䙹	䙺	䙻	䙼	䙽	䙾	䙿
U+468x	䚀	䚁	䚂	䚃	䚄	䚅	䚆	䚇	䚈	䚉	䚊	䚋	䚌	䚍	䚎	䚏
U+469x	䚐	䚑	䚒	䚓	䚔	䚕	䚖	䚗	䚘	䚙	䚚	䚛	䚜	䚝	䚞	䚟
U+46Ax	䚠	䚡	䚢	䚣	䚤	䚥	䚦	䚧	䚨	䚩	䚪	䚫	䚬	䚭	䚮	䚯
U+46Bx	䚰	䚱	䚲	䚳	䚴	䚵	䚶	䚷	䚸	䚹	䚺	䚻	䚼	䚽	䚾	䚿
U+46Cx	䛀	䛁	䛂	䛃	䛄	䛅	䛆	䛇	䛈	䛉	䛊	䛋	䛌	䛍	䛎	䛏
U+46Dx	䛐	䛑	䛒	䛓	䛔	䛕	䛖	䛗	䛘	䛙	䛚	䛛	䛜	䛝	䛞	䛟
U+46Ex	䛠	䛡	䛢	䛣	䛤	䛥	䛦	䛧	䛨	䛩	䛪	䛫	䛬	䛭	䛮	䛯
U+46Fx	䛰	䛱	䛲	䛳	䛴	䛵	䛶	䛷	䛸	䛹	䛺	䛻	䛼	䛽	䛾	䛿
U+470x	䜀	䜁	䜂	䜃	䜄	䜅	䜆	䜇	䜈	䜉	䜊	䜋	䜌	䜍	䜎	䜏
U+471x	䜐	䜑	䜒	䜓	䜔	䜕	䜖	䜗	䜘	䜙	䜚	䜛	䜜	䜝	䜞	䜟
U+472x	䜠	䜡	䜢	䜣	䜤	䜥	䜦	䜧	䜨	䜩	䜪	䜫	䜬	䜭	䜮	䜯
U+473x	䜰	䜱	䜲	䜳	䜴	䜵	䜶	䜷	䜸	䜹	䜺	䜻	䜼	䜽	䜾	䜿
U+474x	䝀	䝁	䝂	䝃	䝄	䝅	䝆	䝇	䝈	䝉	䝊	䝋	䝌	䝍	䝎	䝏
U+475x	䝐	䝑	䝒	䝓	䝔	䝕	䝖	䝗	䝘	䝙	䝚	䝛	䝜	䝝	䝞	䝟
U+476x	䝠	䝡	䝢	䝣	䝤	䝥	䝦	䝧	䝨	䝩	䝪	䝫	䝬	䝭	䝮	䝯
U+477x	䝰	䝱	䝲	䝳	䝴	䝵	䝶	䝷	䝸	䝹	䝺	䝻	䝼	䝽	䝾	䝿
U+478x	䞀	䞁	䞂	䞃	䞄	䞅	䞆	䞇	䞈	䞉	䞊	䞋	䞌	䞍	䞎	䞏
U+479x	䞐	䞑	䞒	䞓	䞔	䞕	䞖	䞗	䞘	䞙	䞚	䞛	䞜	䞝	䞞	䞟
U+47Ax	䞠	䞡	䞢	䞣	䞤	䞥	䞦	䞧	䞨	䞩	䞪	䞫	䞬	䞭	䞮	䞯
U+47Bx	䞰	䞱	䞲	䞳	䞴	䞵	䞶	䞷	䞸	䞹	䞺	䞻	䞼	䞽	䞾	䞿
U+47Cx	䟀	䟁	䟂	䟃	䟄	䟅	䟆	䟇	䟈	䟉	䟊	䟋	䟌	䟍	䟎	䟏
U+47Dx	䟐	䟑	䟒	䟓	䟔	䟕	䟖	䟗	䟘	䟙	䟚	䟛	䟜	䟝	䟞	䟟
U+47Ex	䟠	䟡	䟢	䟣	䟤	䟥	䟦	䟧	䟨	䟩	䟪	䟫	䟬	䟭	䟮	䟯
U+47Fx	䟰	䟱	䟲	䟳	䟴	䟵	䟶	䟷	䟸	䟹	䟺	䟻	䟼	䟽	䟾	䟿
U+480x	䠀	䠁	䠂	䠃	䠄	䠅	䠆	䠇	䠈	䠉	䠊	䠋	䠌	䠍	䠎	䠏
U+481x	䠐	䠑	䠒	䠓	䠔	䠕	䠖	䠗	䠘	䠙	䠚	䠛	䠜	䠝	䠞	䠟
U+482x	䠠	䠡	䠢	䠣	䠤	䠥	䠦	䠧	䠨	䠩	䠪	䠫	䠬	䠭	䠮	䠯
U+483x	䠰	䠱	䠲	䠳	䠴	䠵	䠶	䠷	䠸	䠹	䠺	䠻	䠼	䠽	䠾	䠿
U+484x	䡀	䡁	䡂	䡃	䡄	䡅	䡆	䡇	䡈	䡉	䡊	䡋	䡌	䡍	䡎	䡏
U+485x	䡐	䡑	䡒	䡓	䡔	䡕	䡖	䡗	䡘	䡙	䡚	䡛	䡜	䡝	䡞	䡟
U+486x	䡠	䡡	䡢	䡣	䡤	䡥	䡦	䡧	䡨	䡩	䡪	䡫	䡬	䡭	䡮	䡯
U+487x	䡰	䡱	䡲	䡳	䡴	䡵	䡶	䡷	䡸	䡹	䡺	䡻	䡼	䡽	䡾	䡿
U+488x	䢀	䢁	䢂	䢃	䢄	䢅	䢆	䢇	䢈	䢉	䢊	䢋	䢌	䢍	䢎	䢏
U+489x	䢐	䢑	䢒	䢓	䢔	䢕	䢖	䢗	䢘	䢙	䢚	䢛	䢜	䢝	䢞	䢟
U+48Ax	䢠	䢡	䢢	䢣	䢤	䢥	䢦	䢧	䢨	䢩	䢪	䢫	䢬	䢭	䢮	䢯
U+48Bx	䢰	䢱	䢲	䢳	䢴	䢵	䢶	䢷	䢸	䢹	䢺	䢻	䢼	䢽	䢾	䢿
U+48Cx	䣀	䣁	䣂	䣃	䣄	䣅	䣆	䣇	䣈	䣉	䣊	䣋	䣌	䣍	䣎	䣏
U+48Dx	䣐	䣑	䣒	䣓	䣔	䣕	䣖	䣗	䣘	䣙	䣚	䣛	䣜	䣝	䣞	䣟
U+48Ex	䣠	䣡	䣢	䣣	䣤	䣥	䣦	䣧	䣨	䣩	䣪	䣫	䣬	䣭	䣮	䣯
U+48Fx	䣰	䣱	䣲	䣳	䣴	䣵	䣶	䣷	䣸	䣹	䣺	䣻	䣼	䣽	䣾	䣿
U+490x	䤀	䤁	䤂	䤃	䤄	䤅	䤆	䤇	䤈	䤉	䤊	䤋	䤌	䤍	䤎	䤏
U+491x	䤐	䤑	䤒	䤓	䤔	䤕	䤖	䤗	䤘	䤙	䤚	䤛	䤜	䤝	䤞	䤟
U+492x	䤠	䤡	䤢	䤣	䤤	䤥	䤦	䤧	䤨	䤩	䤪	䤫	䤬	䤭	䤮	䤯
U+493x	䤰	䤱	䤲	䤳	䤴	䤵	䤶	䤷	䤸	䤹	䤺	䤻	䤼	䤽	䤾	䤿
U+494x	䥀	䥁	䥂	䥃	䥄	䥅	䥆	䥇	䥈	䥉	䥊	䥋	䥌	䥍	䥎	䥏
U+495x	䥐	䥑	䥒	䥓	䥔	䥕	䥖	䥗	䥘	䥙	䥚	䥛	䥜	䥝	䥞	䥟
U+496x	䥠	䥡	䥢	䥣	䥤	䥥	䥦	䥧	䥨	䥩	䥪	䥫	䥬	䥭	䥮	䥯
U+497x	䥰	䥱	䥲	䥳	䥴	䥵	䥶	䥷	䥸	䥹	䥺	䥻	䥼	䥽	䥾	䥿
U+498x	䦀	䦁	䦂	䦃	䦄	䦅	䦆	䦇	䦈	䦉	䦊	䦋	䦌	䦍	䦎	䦏
U+499x	䦐	䦑	䦒	䦓	䦔	䦕	䦖	䦗	䦘	䦙	䦚	䦛	䦜	䦝	䦞	䦟
U+49Ax	䦠	䦡	䦢	䦣	䦤	䦥	䦦	䦧	䦨	䦩	䦪	䦫	䦬	䦭	䦮	䦯
U+49Bx	䦰	䦱	䦲	䦳	䦴	䦵	䦶	䦷	䦸	䦹	䦺	䦻	䦼	䦽	䦾	䦿
U+49Cx	䧀	䧁	䧂	䧃	䧄	䧅	䧆	䧇	䧈	䧉	䧊	䧋	䧌	䧍	䧎	䧏
U+49Dx	䧐	䧑	䧒	䧓	䧔	䧕	䧖	䧗	䧘	䧙	䧚	䧛	䧜	䧝	䧞	䧟
U+49Ex	䧠	䧡	䧢	䧣	䧤	䧥	䧦	䧧	䧨	䧩	䧪	䧫	䧬	䧭	䧮	䧯
U+49Fx	䧰	䧱	䧲	䧳	䧴	䧵	䧶	䧷	䧸	䧹	䧺	䧻	䧼	䧽	䧾	䧿
U+4A0x	䨀	䨁	䨂	䨃	䨄	䨅	䨆	䨇	䨈	䨉	䨊	䨋	䨌	䨍	䨎	䨏
U+4A1x	䨐	䨑	䨒	䨓	䨔	䨕	䨖	䨗	䨘	䨙	䨚	䨛	䨜	䨝	䨞	䨟
U+4A2x	䨠	䨡	䨢	䨣	䨤	䨥	䨦	䨧	䨨	䨩	䨪	䨫	䨬	䨭	䨮	䨯
U+4A3x	䨰	䨱	䨲	䨳	䨴	䨵	䨶	䨷	䨸	䨹	䨺	䨻	䨼	䨽	䨾	䨿
U+4A4x	䩀	䩁	䩂	䩃	䩄	䩅	䩆	䩇	䩈	䩉	䩊	䩋	䩌	䩍	䩎	䩏
U+4A5x	䩐	䩑	䩒	䩓	䩔	䩕	䩖	䩗	䩘	䩙	䩚	䩛	䩜	䩝	䩞	䩟
U+4A6x	䩠	䩡	䩢	䩣	䩤	䩥	䩦	䩧	䩨	䩩	䩪	䩫	䩬	䩭	䩮	䩯
U+4A7x	䩰	䩱	䩲	䩳	䩴	䩵	䩶	䩷	䩸	䩹	䩺	䩻	䩼	䩽	䩾	䩿
U+4A8x	䪀	䪁	䪂	䪃	䪄	䪅	䪆	䪇	䪈	䪉	䪊	䪋	䪌	䪍	䪎	䪏
U+4A9x	䪐	䪑	䪒	䪓	䪔	䪕	䪖	䪗	䪘	䪙	䪚	䪛	䪜	䪝	䪞	䪟
U+4AAx	䪠	䪡	䪢	䪣	䪤	䪥	䪦	䪧	䪨	䪩	䪪	䪫	䪬	䪭	䪮	䪯
U+4ABx	䪰	䪱	䪲	䪳	䪴	䪵	䪶	䪷	䪸	䪹	䪺	䪻	䪼	䪽	䪾	䪿
U+4ACx	䫀	䫁	䫂	䫃	䫄	䫅	䫆	䫇	䫈	䫉	䫊	䫋	䫌	䫍	䫎	䫏
U+4ADx	䫐	䫑	䫒	䫓	䫔	䫕	䫖	䫗	䫘	䫙	䫚	䫛	䫜	䫝	䫞	䫟
U+4AEx	䫠	䫡	䫢	䫣	䫤	䫥	䫦	䫧	䫨	䫩	䫪	䫫	䫬	䫭	䫮	䫯
U+4AFx	䫰	䫱	䫲	䫳	䫴	䫵	䫶	䫷	䫸	䫹	䫺	䫻	䫼	䫽	䫾	䫿
U+4B0x	䬀	䬁	䬂	䬃	䬄	䬅	䬆	䬇	䬈	䬉	䬊	䬋	䬌	䬍	䬎	䬏
U+4B1x	䬐	䬑	䬒	䬓	䬔	䬕	䬖	䬗	䬘	䬙	䬚	䬛	䬜	䬝	䬞	䬟
U+4B2x	䬠	䬡	䬢	䬣	䬤	䬥	䬦	䬧	䬨	䬩	䬪	䬫	䬬	䬭	䬮	䬯
U+4B3x	䬰	䬱	䬲	䬳	䬴	䬵	䬶	䬷	䬸	䬹	䬺	䬻	䬼	䬽	䬾	䬿
U+4B4x	䭀	䭁	䭂	䭃	䭄	䭅	䭆	䭇	䭈	䭉	䭊	䭋	䭌	䭍	䭎	䭏
U+4B5x	䭐	䭑	䭒	䭓	䭔	䭕	䭖	䭗	䭘	䭙	䭚	䭛	䭜	䭝	䭞	䭟
U+4B6x	䭠	䭡	䭢	䭣	䭤	䭥	䭦	䭧	䭨	䭩	䭪	䭫	䭬	䭭	䭮	䭯
U+4B7x	䭰	䭱	䭲	䭳	䭴	䭵	䭶	䭷	䭸	䭹	䭺	䭻	䭼	䭽	䭾	䭿
U+4B8x	䮀	䮁	䮂	䮃	䮄	䮅	䮆	䮇	䮈	䮉	䮊	䮋	䮌	䮍	䮎	䮏
U+4B9x	䮐	䮑	䮒	䮓	䮔	䮕	䮖	䮗	䮘	䮙	䮚	䮛	䮜	䮝	䮞	䮟
U+4BAx	䮠	䮡	䮢	䮣	䮤	䮥	䮦	䮧	䮨	䮩	䮪	䮫	䮬	䮭	䮮	䮯
U+4BBx	䮰	䮱	䮲	䮳	䮴	䮵	䮶	䮷	䮸	䮹	䮺	䮻	䮼	䮽	䮾	䮿
U+4BCx	䯀	䯁	䯂	䯃	䯄	䯅	䯆	䯇	䯈	䯉	䯊	䯋	䯌	䯍	䯎	䯏
U+4BDx	䯐	䯑	䯒	䯓	䯔	䯕	䯖	䯗	䯘	䯙	䯚	䯛	䯜	䯝	䯞	䯟
U+4BEx	䯠	䯡	䯢	䯣	䯤	䯥	䯦	䯧	䯨	䯩	䯪	䯫	䯬	䯭	䯮	䯯
U+4BFx	䯰	䯱	䯲	䯳	䯴	䯵	䯶	䯷	䯸	䯹	䯺	䯻	䯼	䯽	䯾	䯿
U+4C0x	䰀	䰁	䰂	䰃	䰄	䰅	䰆	䰇	䰈	䰉	䰊	䰋	䰌	䰍	䰎	䰏
U+4C1x	䰐	䰑	䰒	䰓	䰔	䰕	䰖	䰗	䰘	䰙	䰚	䰛	䰜	䰝	䰞	䰟
U+4C2x	䰠	䰡	䰢	䰣	䰤	䰥	䰦	䰧	䰨	䰩	䰪	䰫	䰬	䰭	䰮	䰯
U+4C3x	䰰	䰱	䰲	䰳	䰴	䰵	䰶	䰷	䰸	䰹	䰺	䰻	䰼	䰽	䰾	䰿
U+4C4x	䱀	䱁	䱂	䱃	䱄	䱅	䱆	䱇	䱈	䱉	䱊	䱋	䱌	䱍	䱎	䱏
U+4C5x	䱐	䱑	䱒	䱓	䱔	䱕	䱖	䱗	䱘	䱙	䱚	䱛	䱜	䱝	䱞	䱟
U+4C6x	䱠	䱡	䱢	䱣	䱤	䱥	䱦	䱧	䱨	䱩	䱪	䱫	䱬	䱭	䱮	䱯
U+4C7x	䱰	䱱	䱲	䱳	䱴	䱵	䱶	䱷	䱸	䱹	䱺	䱻	䱼	䱽	䱾	䱿
U+4C8x	䲀	䲁	䲂	䲃	䲄	䲅	䲆	䲇	䲈	䲉	䲊	䲋	䲌	䲍	䲎	䲏
U+4C9x	䲐	䲑	䲒	䲓	䲔	䲕	䲖	䲗	䲘	䲙	䲚	䲛	䲜	䲝	䲞	䲟
U+4CAx	䲠	䲡	䲢	䲣	䲤	䲥	䲦	䲧	䲨	䲩	䲪	䲫	䲬	䲭	䲮	䲯
U+4CBx	䲰	䲱	䲲	䲳	䲴	䲵	䲶	䲷	䲸	䲹	䲺	䲻	䲼	䲽	䲾	䲿
U+4CCx	䳀	䳁	䳂	䳃	䳄	䳅	䳆	䳇	䳈	䳉	䳊	䳋	䳌	䳍	䳎	䳏
U+4CDx	䳐	䳑	䳒	䳓	䳔	䳕	䳖	䳗	䳘	䳙	䳚	䳛	䳜	䳝	䳞	䳟
U+4CEx	䳠	䳡	䳢	䳣	䳤	䳥	䳦	䳧	䳨	䳩	䳪	䳫	䳬	䳭	䳮	䳯
U+4CFx	䳰	䳱	䳲	䳳	䳴	䳵	䳶	䳷	䳸	䳹	䳺	䳻	䳼	䳽	䳾	䳿
U+4D0x	䴀	䴁	䴂	䴃	䴄	䴅	䴆	䴇	䴈	䴉	䴊	䴋	䴌	䴍	䴎	䴏
U+4D1x	䴐	䴑	䴒	䴓	䴔	䴕	䴖	䴗	䴘	䴙	䴚	䴛	䴜	䴝	䴞	䴟
U+4D2x	䴠	䴡	䴢	䴣	䴤	䴥	䴦	䴧	䴨	䴩	䴪	䴫	䴬	䴭	䴮	䴯
U+4D3x	䴰	䴱	䴲	䴳	䴴	䴵	䴶	䴷	䴸	䴹	䴺	䴻	䴼	䴽	䴾	䴿
U+4D4x	䵀	䵁	䵂	䵃	䵄	䵅	䵆	䵇	䵈	䵉	䵊	䵋	䵌	䵍	䵎	䵏
U+4D5x	䵐	䵑	䵒	䵓	䵔	䵕	䵖	䵗	䵘	䵙	䵚	䵛	䵜	䵝	䵞	䵟
U+4D6x	䵠	䵡	䵢	䵣	䵤	䵥	䵦	䵧	䵨	䵩	䵪	䵫	䵬	䵭	䵮	䵯
U+4D7x	䵰	䵱	䵲	䵳	䵴	䵵	䵶	䵷	䵸	䵹	䵺	䵻	䵼	䵽	䵾	䵿
U+4D8x	䶀	䶁	䶂	䶃	䶄	䶅	䶆	䶇	䶈	䶉	䶊	䶋	䶌	䶍	䶎	䶏
U+4D9x	䶐	䶑	䶒	䶓	䶔	䶕	䶖	䶗	䶘	䶙	䶚	䶛	䶜	䶝	䶞	䶟
U+4DAx	䶠	䶡	䶢	䶣	䶤	䶥	䶦	䶧	䶨	䶩	䶪	䶫	䶬	䶭	䶮	䶯
U+4DBx	䶰	䶱	䶲	䶳	䶴	䶵	䶶	䶷	䶸	䶹	䶺	䶻	䶼	䶽	䶾	䶿
Notes 1.As of Unicode version 17.0

== History ==
The following Unicode-related documents record the purpose and process of defining specific characters in the CJK Unified Ideographs Extension A block:

Version	Final code points (Note: Proposed code points and characters names may differ from final code points and names)	Count	L2 ID	WG2 ID	IRG ID	Document
3.0	U+3400..4DB5	6,582		N1423	N364	Proposal Summary Form: CJK Unified Ideographs Extension A, 1996-08-01
3.0	U+3400..4DB5	6,582		N1424	N382	CJK Unified Ideograph Extension A Version 1.1, 1996-08-01
3.0	U+3400..4DB5	6,582		N1425	N378	Draft Text of General Description for Extension A, 1996-08-01
3.0	U+3400..4DB5	6,582		N1426	N379	Draft Text of CJK Annex for Extension A, 1996-08-01
3.0	U+3400..4DB5	6,582		N1455		Lu, Chin (1996-08-06), More Evidence on CJK Extension A
3.0	U+3400..4DB5	6,582		N1439		Korea's comments on IRG Proposal, 1996-08-12
3.0	U+3400..4DB5	6,582		N1449		Wang, Xiaoming (1996-08-12), The Great Chinese Word Dictionary with CJK Extensions
3.0	U+3400..4DB5	6,582		N1453		Ksar, Mike; Umamaheswaran, V. S. (1996-12-06), "9. IRG status and reports", WG 2 Minutes - Quebec Meeting 31
3.0	U+3400..4DB5	6,582		N1479		Ksar, Mike (1997-01-10), Results of SC2 questionnaire on allocation of 6585 Han characters in BMP
3.0	U+3400..4DB5	6,582		N1487		IRG position concerning Japanese comments on extension A, 1997-01-15
3.0	U+3400..4DB5	6,582	L2/97-030	N1503 (pdf, doc)		Umamaheswaran, V. S.; Ksar, Mike (1997-04-01), "9.2", Unconfirmed Minutes of WG 2 Meeting #32, Singapore; 1997-01-20--24
3.0	U+3400..4DB5	6,582	L2/97-254R			Orita, Tetsuji (1997-11-20), Comment on CJK Unified Ideograph Extension-A by IRG
3.0	U+3400..4DB5	6,582	L2/97-279			Kobayashi, Tatsuo (1997-12-01), Comment on Contribution by Tet Orita titled "Comment on CJK Unified Ideograph Extension-A by IRG"
3.0	U+3400..4DB5	6,582	L2/98-039			Aliprand, Joan; Winkler, Arnold (1998-02-24), "3.B.1. Existing compatibility characters also in CJK Extension A", Preliminary Minutes - UTC #74 & L2 #171, Mountain View, CA - December 5, 1997
3.0	U+3400..4DB5	6,582	L2/98-096	N1723		CJK Unified Ideographs Extension A, High Quality Printing, Version 2.0, 1998-03-02
3.0	U+3400..4DB5	6,582	L2/98-103	N1733		Text for FPDAM #17 - CJK Unified Ideographs Extension A, 1998-03-20
3.0	U+3400..4DB5	6,582	L2/98-171	N1776		Text for PDAM registration and FPDAM ballot for ISO 10646-1 Amendment 17 - CJK Unified Ideographs Extension A, 1998-05-01
3.0	U+3400..4DB5	6,582	L2/98-170			Winkler, Arnold (1998-05-11), PDAM registration and FPDAM ballot for ISO 10646-1 Amendment 17 - CJK Extension A
3.0	U+3400..4DB5	6,582	L2/98-286	N1703		Umamaheswaran, V. S.; Ksar, Mike (1998-07-02), "9.1.2", Unconfirmed Meeting Minutes, WG 2 Meeting #34, Redmond, WA, USA; 1998-03-16--20
3.0	U+3400..4DB5	6,582	L2/98-334			Revised Text of ISO/IEC 10646-1/FPDAM 17, AMENDMENT 17: CJK Unified Ideograph Extension A, 1998-11-02
3.0	U+3400..4DB5	6,582	L2/98-347			Disposition of comments report on SC2 N3090, ISO 10646 Amd. 17: CJK unified ideograph extension A, 1998-11-02
3.0	U+3400..4DB5	6,582	L2/99-010	N1903 (pdf, html, doc)		Umamaheswaran, V. S. (1998-12-30), "6.7.2", Minutes of WG 2 meeting 35, London, U.K.; 1998-09-21--25
3.0	U+3400..4DB5	6,582	L2/99-023	N1943		Paterson, Bruce; Sato, T. K. (1999-01-08), Revision of 10646-1 Annex T for CJK Unified Ideographs Extension A (Draft)
3.0	U+3400..4DB5	6,582	L2/99-156			Table of replies on ISO/IEC 10646-1/FDAM 17 - CJK Unified Ideographs Extension A, 1999-05-17
3.0	U+3400..4DB5	6,582	L2/99-232	N2003		Umamaheswaran, V. S. (1999-08-03), "7.1.3 Revision of Annex T for CJK Extension A", Minutes of WG 2 meeting 36, Fukuoka, Japan, 1999-03-09--15
3.0	U+3400..4DB5	6,582	L2/99-287			Notice of publication for ISO/IEC 10646-1/Amd. 17, CJK Unified Ideographs Extension A, 1999-08-19
3.0	U+3400..4DB5	6,582	L2/99-335	N2109	N674	Zhang, Zhoucai (1999-09-03), SuperCJK, version 9.0 with Kangxi and HYD data
3.0	U+3400..4DB5	6,582	L2/03-287			Cook, Richard (2003-08-24), 16 UniHan.txt errors
3.0	U+3400..4DB5	6,582	L2/03-301			Cook, Richard (2003-08-27), 24 more UniHan.txt errors
3.0	U+3400..4DB5	6,582	L2/03-311			West, Andrew (2003-09-17), Unicode 4.0.1 Beta Review, comments from Andrew C. West
3.0	U+3400..4DB5	6,582	L2/03-399			Fok, Anthony (2003-10-13), Unihan reported errors / changes re kHKSCS entries
3.0	U+3400..4DB5	6,582	L2/03-367	N2667		Suignard, Michel; Muller, Eric; Jenkins, John (2003-10-22), CJK Ideograph source references corrections
3.0	U+3400..4DB5	6,582	L2/03-398			Nguyen, D. (2003-10-29), Unihan reported errors / changes re kCowles
3.0	U+3400..4DB5	6,582	L2/03-453			Minutes of the Editorial Group Ad Hoc Discussion, 2003-12-17
3.0	U+3400..4DB5	6,582	L2/04-208	N2774R	N1064	Proposal to add 6 KP source references to existing CJK Unified Ideographs, 2004-05-25
3.0	U+3400..4DB5	6,582		N3353 (pdf, doc)		Umamaheswaran, V. S. (2007-10-10), "M51.9", Unconfirmed minutes of WG 2 meeting 51 Hanzhou, China; 2007-04-24/27
3.0	U+3400..4DB5	6,582	L2/07-208	N3285		Proposal to replace 11 KP source references to existing ISO/IEC 10646:2003, 2007-07-18
3.0	U+3400..4DB5	6,582	L2/10-215			Lunde, Ken (2010-06-22), "Hanyo-Denshi" IVD Collection (PRI 167) to Adobe-Japan1-6 Mapping Table
3.0	U+3400..4DB5	6,582	L2/13-016			Suignard, Michel (2013-01-24), CJK Ext-A fix
3.0	U+3400..4DB5	6,582	L2/13-011			Moore, Lisa (2013-02-04), "CJK — Extension-A Fix", UTC #134 Minutes
3.0	U+3400..4DB5	6,582		N4403 (pdf, doc)		Umamaheswaran, V. S. (2014-01-28), "Resolution M61.02 item b", Unconfirmed minutes of WG 2 meeting 61, Holiday Inn, Vilnius, Lithuania; 2013-06-10/14
3.0	U+3400..4DB5	6,582	L2/14-149	N4544		Suignard, Michel (2014-07-18), CJK ideographs glyphs representation and sources references
3.0	U+3400..4DB5	6,582		N4553 (pdf, doc)		Umamaheswaran, V. S. (2014-09-16), "9.1.3", Minutes of WG 2 meeting 62 Adobe, San Jose, CA, USA
3.0	U+3400..4DB5	6,582	L2/14-260	N4621		Suignard, Michel (2014-10-23), CJK chart and source references update
3.0	U+3400..4DB5	6,582	L2/16-052	N4603 (pdf, doc)		Umamaheswaran, V. S. (2015-09-01), "M63.05", Unconfirmed minutes of WG 2 meeting 63
3.0	U+3400..4DB5	6,582	L2/17-180		N2202	Chan, Eiso (2017-06-02), Request for consideration to add kIRG_GSource values to thirteen ideographs and change two G-source glyphs for the Table of General Standard Chinese Characters [Affects U+37C3 and 3FE0]
3.0	U+3400..4DB5	6,582		N4974	N2301	Request of TCA's Horizontal Extension for Chemical Terminology [Affects U+44EC], 2018-06-12
3.0	U+3400..4DB5	6,582		N4987		Proposal on China's Horizontal Extension for 14 CJK Ideographs [Affects U+37C3 and 3FE0], 2018-06-13
3.0	U+3400..4DB5	6,582		N4988		Proposal on Updating 11 G glyphs of CJK Unified Ideographs to ISO/IEC 10646 [Affects U+3B9D, 3CFD and 4A76], 2018-06-13
3.0	U+3400..4DB5	6,582		N5016	N2349	Shin, Sanghyun; Cho, Sungduk; Pyo, Seungju; Kim, Kyongsok (2018-12-13), Request to move character K6-1022 in Horizontal Extension of KS X 1027-5 from U+3EAC to U+248F2
3.0	U+3400..4DB5	6,582		N5020 (pdf, doc)		Umamaheswaran, V. S. (2019-01-11), "10.4.6, 10.4.8 and 10.4.9", Unconfirmed minutes of WG 2 meeting 67
3.0	U+3400..4DB5	6,582	L2/19-242	N5094	N2370	Chan, Eiso (2019-02-14), 20 questionable V4-Source characters in Ext. C and Ext. E [Affects U+440B]
3.0	U+3400..4DB5	6,582		N5086	N2379	Proposal of China's horizontal extension for technical used characters [Affects U+3472, 3DB8 and 3FE0], 2019-05-10
3.0	U+3400..4DB5	6,582	L2/19-237	N5068		Editorial Report on Miscellaneous Issues (meeting IRG#52) [Affects U+3EAC and 440B], 2019-05-17
3.0	U+3400..4DB5	6,582	L2/19-241	N5083	N2391	Errata report for WG2 submission_TCA [Affects U+440B], 2019-05-31
3.0	U+3400..4DB5	6,582	L2/22-077		N2512R	Shin, SangHyun; Cho, Sungduk; Kim, Kyongsok (2021-11-02), A revised proposal requesting a Horizontal Extension of 51 Hanja chars (previously submitted for ExtF/G/H) [Affects U+34DC, 3BF6, and 3C43]
3.0	U+3400..4DB5	6,582	L2/22-054		N2545	Chung, Jaemin (2022-02-28), G glyph for U+48B4
3.0	U+3400..4DB5	6,582	L2/22-067			Lunde, Ken (2022-04-16), "17 [Affects U+48B4], 19 [Affects U+34DC, 3BF6, and 3C43]", CJK & Unihan Group Recommendations for UTC #171 Meeting
3.0	U+3400..4DB5	6,582	L2/22-061			Constable, Peter (2022-07-27), "E.1 Section 17 [Affects U+48B4], E.1 Section 19 [Affects U+34DC, 3BF6, and 3C43]", Approved Minutes of UTC Meeting 171
3.0	U+3400..4DB5	6,582	L2/22-258			Shin, SangHyun; Kim, Kyongsok (2022-10-14), Changing glyphs and IDSs of 97 KR Hanja chars containing '叱 (U+53F1)' [Affects U+357E, 358B–358E, 3599–359D, 35AF, 35B0, 35B2, 35B3, 35DF–35E1, 35EF, 360F, and 3612]
3.0	U+3400..4DB5	6,582	L2/22-247			Lunde, Ken (2022-11-01), "25) L2/22-258", CJK & Unihan Group Recommendations for UTC #173 Meeting
3.0	U+3400..4DB5	6,582	L2/22-241			Constable, Peter (2022-11-09), "E.1 25) L2/22-258", Approved Minutes of UTC Meeting 173
3.0	U+3400..4DB5	6,582	L2/23-011			Lunde, Ken (2023-01-11), "07) 2022-12-27 19:01:03 CST [Affects U+44D5]", CJK & Unihan Group Recommendations for UTC #174 Meeting
3.0	U+3400..4DB5	6,582	L2/23-005			Constable, Peter (2023-02-01), "E.1 Section 07) 2022-12-27 19:01:03 CST [Affects U+44D5]", UTC #174 Minutes
3.0	U+3400..4DB5	6,582	L2/23-143	N5198		Kim, Kyongsok (2023-03-26), Adding a self-referencing source reference "KU-03E02" to U+3E02 [Affects U+3E02]
3.0	U+3400..4DB5	6,582	L2/23-082			Lunde, Ken (2023-04-22), "14 [Affects U+3A9C]", CJK & Unihan Group Recommendations for UTC #175 Meeting
3.0	U+3400..4DB5	6,582	L2/23-076			Constable, Peter (2023-05-01), "E.1 Section 14 [Affects U+3A9C]", UTC #175 Minutes
3.0	U+3400..4DB5	6,582	L2/23-163			Lunde, Ken (2023-07-11), "09 [Affects U+2EDE3] and 16 [Affects U+3E02]", CJK & Unihan Group Recommendations for UTC #176 Meeting
3.0	U+3400..4DB5	6,582	L2/23-157			Constable, Peter (2023-07-31), "E.1 Section 16 [Affects U+3E02]", UTC #176 Minutes
3.0	U+3400..4DB5	6,582	L2/25-009			Lunde, Ken (2025-01-10), "07 [Affects U+48CB]", CJK & Unihan Working Group Recommendations for UTC #182 Meeting
3.0	U+3400..4DB5	6,582	L2/25-003			Leroy, Robin (2025-01-28), "Consensus 182-C24", UTC #182 Minutes, "Accept the proposal to change the G-source representative glyph of U+48CB"
13.0	U+4DB6..4DBF	10	L2/19-242	N5094	N2370	Chan, Eiso (2019-02-14), 20 questionable V4-Source characters in Ext. C and Ext. E [Affects U+4DB6]
13.0	U+4DB6..4DBF	10	L2/19-239	N5080	N2338	TCA's feedback to IRG N2338 [Affects U+4DB7, 4DB9, 4DBE and 4DBF], 2019-05-14
13.0	U+4DB6..4DBF	10	L2/19-240	N5081	N2337	Disunification of U+2F83B/U+5406 [Affects U+4DB8], 2019-05-14
13.0	U+4DB6..4DBF	10	L2/19-241	N5083	N2391	Errata report for WG2 submission_TCA [Affects U+4DBA, 4DBB, 4DBC and 4DBD], 2019-05-31
13.0	U+4DB6..4DBF	10		N5122		"M68.07", Unconfirmed minutes of WG 2 meeting 68, 2019-12-31
13.0	U+4DB6..4DBF	10	L2/19-270			Moore, Lisa (2019-10-07), "Consensus 160-C14", UTC #160 Minutes
13.0	U+4DB6..4DBF	10	L2/21-228		N2520	West, Andrew (2021-11-15), Request to move the source reference for UK-02830 [Affects U+4DBE]
13.0	U+4DB6..4DBF	10	L2/22-022			Lunde, Ken (2022-01-26), "10 [Affects U+4DBE]", CJK & Unihan Group Recommendations for UTC #170 Meeting
13.0	U+4DB6..4DBF	10	L2/22-016			Constable, Peter (2022-04-21), "E.1 10 [Affects U+4DBE]", UTC #170 Minutes
