= Manichaean (Unicode block) =

- Range: U+10AC0..U+10AFF (64 code points)
- Plane: SMP
- Scripts: Manichaean
- Major alphabets: Sogdian, Parthian, Fars
- Assigned: 51 code points
- Unused: 13 reserved code points

Unicode version history
- 7.0 (2014): 51 (+51)

Unicode documentation
- Code chart ∣ Web page

Manichaean is a Unicode block containing characters historically used for writing Sogdian, Parthian, and the dialects of Fars.

== Block ==
Manichaean^{[1]}^{[2]} Official Unicode Consortium code chart (PDF)
| | 0 | 1 | 2 | 3 | 4 | 5 | 6 | 7 | 8 | 9 | A | B | C | D | E | F |
| U+10ACx | 𐫀 | 𐫁 | 𐫂 | 𐫃 | 𐫄 | 𐫅 | 𐫆 | 𐫇 | 𐫈 | 𐫉 | 𐫊 | 𐫋 | 𐫌 | 𐫍 | 𐫎 | 𐫏 |
| U+10ADx | 𐫐 | 𐫑 | 𐫒 | 𐫓 | 𐫔 | 𐫕 | 𐫖 | 𐫗 | 𐫘 | 𐫙 | 𐫚 | 𐫛 | 𐫜 | 𐫝 | 𐫞 | 𐫟 |
| U+10AEx | 𐫠 | 𐫡 | 𐫢 | 𐫣 | 𐫤 | 𐫥 | 𐫦 | | | | | 𐫫 | 𐫬 | 𐫭 | 𐫮 | 𐫯 |
| U+10AFx | 𐫰 | 𐫱 | 𐫲 | 𐫳 | 𐫴 | 𐫵 | 𐫶 | | | | | | | | | |
Notes: 1. As of Unicode version 17.0; 2. Grey areas indicate non-assigned code points

The block has five variation sequences defined for standardized variants. They use U+FE00 VARIATION SELECTOR-1 (VS1) to denote alternate letter forms:

Variation sequences for alternate forms
| U+ | 10AC5 | 10AC6 | 10AD6 | 10AD7 | 10AE1 |
| base code point | 𐫅 | 𐫆 | 𐫖 | 𐫗 | 𐫡 |
| base + VS01 | 𐫅︀ | 𐫆︀ | 𐫖︀ | 𐫗︀ | 𐫡︀ |

== History ==
The following Unicode-related documents record the purpose and process of defining specific characters in the Manichaean block:

| Version | Final code points (Note: Proposed code points and characters names may differ from final code points and names) | Count | L2 ID | WG2 ID | Document |
|---|---|---|---|---|---|
| 7.0 | U+10AC0..10AE6, 10AEB..10AF6 | 51 | L2/00-128 | | Bunz, Carl-Martin (2000-03-01), Scripts from the Past in Future Versions of Unicode |
| 7.0 | U+10AC0..10AE6, 10AEB..10AF6 | 51 | L2/00-153 | | Bunz, Carl-Martin (2000-04-26), Further comments on historic scripts |
| 7.0 | U+10AC0..10AE6, 10AEB..10AF6 | 51 | L2/01-007 | | Bunz, Carl-Martin (2000-12-21), "Manichaean and Christian Sogdian Scripts", Iranianist Meeting Report: Symposium on Encoding Iranian Scripts in Unicode |
| 7.0 | U+10AC0..10AE6, 10AEB..10AF6 | 51 | L2/02-009 | | Bunz, Carl-Martin (2001-11-23), "Manichaean script", 2nd Iranian Meeting Report |
| 7.0 | U+10AC0..10AE6, 10AEB..10AF6 | 51 | L2/03-099 | N2544 | Everson, Michael (2002-12-03), Revised proposal to encode the Manichaean script in the UCS |
| 7.0 | U+10AC0..10AE6, 10AEB..10AF6 | 51 | L2/04-292 | | McGowan, Rick (2004-07-20), Manichaean Joining Types and Shaping Behavior |
| 7.0 | U+10AC0..10AE6, 10AEB..10AF6 | 51 | L2/08-025 | N3378 | Everson, Michael (2008-01-28), Revised proposal to encode the Manichaean script in the UCS |
| 7.0 | U+10AC0..10AE6, 10AEB..10AF6 | 51 | L2/08-271R2 | N3486R2 | Everson, Michael; Durkin-Meisterernst, Desmond (2008-11-01), Proposal for encoding the Manichaean script in the SMP of the UCS |
| 7.0 | U+10AC0..10AE6, 10AEB..10AF6 | 51 | L2/09-284 | | Pournader, Roozbeh; Anderson, Deborah (2009-08-06), Specifying Joining Behavior for Manichaean Aleph |
| 7.0 | U+10AC0..10AE6, 10AEB..10AF6 | 51 | L2/09-186 | N3644 | Everson, Michael; Durkin-Meisterernst, Desmond (2009-09-30), Revised proposal for encoding the Manichaean script in the SMP of the UCS |
| 7.0 | U+10AC0..10AE6, 10AEB..10AF6 | 51 | L2/11-123R | N4029R | Everson, Michael; Durkin-Meisterernst, Desmond; Pournader, Roozbeh; Afshar, Shervin (2011-05-10), Second revised proposal for encoding the Manichaean script in the SMP of the UCS |
| 7.0 | U+10AC0..10AE6, 10AEB..10AF6 | 51 | L2/11-116 | | Moore, Lisa (2011-05-17), "C.10", UTC #127 / L2 #224 Minutes |
| 7.0 | U+10AC0..10AE6, 10AEB..10AF6 | 51 | | N4103 | "11.10 Manichaean script", Unconfirmed minutes of WG 2 meeting 58, 2012-01-03 |
| 7.0 | U+10AC0..10AE6, 10AEB..10AF6 | 51 | L2/14-026 | | Moore, Lisa (2014-02-17), "C.9", UTC #138 Minutes |
| 7.0 | U+10AC0..10AE6, 10AEB..10AF6 | 51 | | N4553 (pdf, doc) | Umamaheswaran, V. S. (2014-09-16), "M62.02d, M62.02h", Minutes of WG 2 meeting 62 Adobe, San Jose, CA, USA |
