= Versus (Little Ghost album) =

Studio album by Little Ghost
- Released: 14 September 2015
- Recorded: November 2014–August 2015, The Stuffett Inn Studios, Shrewsbury, Shropshire
- Genre: Indie Rock, Garage Rock, lo-fi
- Length: 38:47
- Label: Independent
- Producer: Mickey Evans

Little Ghost chronology
| Queen Bee EP (2014) | Versus (2015) |

Singles from Little Ghost
- 1. "Tiny Little Flicker" Released: 15 June 2015; 2. "Carpe Diem (Yourself)" Released: 16 August 2015; 3. "Nightcrawlers" Released: 28 August 2015; 4. "Bloody Murder" Released: 12 October 2015

Versus is the debut studio album by the British rock band Little Ghost. Released on 14 September 2015, the album was self-produced and self-released by the band exclusively via their Bandcamp page and a limited run of compact disks. Despite being their debut album, Versus represents a musical shift in styles from the band's previous release Queen Bee EP with Versus being much more stripped back and relying on typical rock-band instrumentation. The artwork for the album and its respective singles was produced by photographer Matthew Draper and was inspired by the piece "Boy Meets Girl" by the street-artist Banksy.

The album received positive reviews and several of its tracks have become some of the most popular among fans. However, the band has since expressed mixed feelings about the final version of the album.

Versus is the band's only studio album to feature bass guitarist Ryan O'Connor and guitarist Mickey Evans.

== Recording ==
The band decided to try to convey their live sound more with their debut album, as this would leave room for experimentation in future releases and present the band in their "most honest form". Versus was primarily recorded in guitarist Mickey Evans' front room with the exception of Chris Greenhaigh's drum parts, which he recorded himself in his shed. The vocals for 'In Your Bed' were recorded in front-man Louis Cooper-Hughes' bedroom using a laptop microphone. In comparison to their previous releases, Versus has a much heavier sound with many of the songs being influenced by Indie Rock and Punk music.

== Promotion ==
The tracks "Tiny Little Flicker", "Carpe Diem (Yourself)" and "Nightcrawlers" were released as promotional singles with accompanying lyric videos. In promotion of Versus the band embarked on a small UK tour supporting City Of Ashes and A Mouth Full Of Matches shortly after the album's release. On the week beginning 12 October the band released 5 lo-fi music videos recorded on each date of their UK tour, videos were released for the tracks "Bloody Murder" and "Shotgun Wedding" as well as for their previous 3 singles.

== Critical reception ==
Professional ratings
Review scores
| Source | Rating |
|---|---|
| SputnikMusic | 4/5 stars |
| Music Matters | 9/10 stars |

Versus was met with generally positive reviews from independent music critics. The album received a 4-star rating on Sputnikmusic, being their second-highest rated release on the site. Radio KC described the opening track 'Tiny Little Flicker' as containing "a thunderous and absorbing melodic might with edgy vocal perkiness." Altcorner highlighted 'Carpe Diem (Yourself)' in a live review stating that "The guitar play in ‘Carpe Diem Yourself‘ is one that most bands could only dream of. They had me salivating for more of that guitar."

Music Matters stated in their review that, "Through the album, the guitars take a great deal melodically and technically in their music along the distinctive vocals. It seems that you have to dig hard to discover a band like Little Ghost, which is worth doing. And this album should be heard by wider audiences. Little Ghost assure you the quality in their music with “Versus”. I hope you enjoy this album as much as I do."

Despite receiving positive reviews, certain members of the band have expressed mixed feelings regarding the album's quality. Louis Cooper-Hughes has stated that the band rushed production and feels like it impacted the overall sound quality whilst Ryan O'Connor has claimed to have never listened to the final product.

== Track listing ==
| No. | Title | Length |
|---|---|---|
| 1. | "Tiny Little Flicker" | 3:25 |
| 2. | "Shotgun Wedding" | 3:40 |
| 3. | "Red Light" | 3:19 |
| 4. | "India" | 3:01 |
| 5. | "Battlefields" | 1:58 |
| 6. | "In Your Bed" | 3:45 |
| 7. | "Bloody Murder" | 4:20 |
| 8. | "Carpe Diem (Yourself)" | 3:25 |
| 9. | "Nightcrawlers" | 3:42 |
| 10. | "Ladies And Gentlemen" | 4:58 |
| 11. | "The Finishing Touch" | 3:16 |
| Total length: | | 38:47 |

Bonus tracks

Digital download Bonus Tracks
| No. | Title | Length |
|---|---|---|
| 12. | "Vampires (Live At The Star Hotel)" | 3:39 |
| 13. | "Queen Bee (Live At The Star Hotel)" | 5.52 |
| 14. | "Ladies And Gentlemen (Live At The Star Hotel)" | 4:35 |

== Personnel ==
- Louis Cooper-Hughes – lead vocals, guitar, backing vocals
- Mickey Evans – guitar, backing vocals, co-lead vocals on "Battlefields" and "Ladies and Gentlemen"
- Ryan O'Connor – bass, backing vocals
- Chris Greenhaigh - drums, backing vocals
