= Little Ghost EP =

Little Ghost

EP by Little Ghost
- Released: 19 June 2013
- Recorded: 2012 at The Barn, Shropshire
- Genre: Indie pop, Neo-psychedelia, Alternative rock
- Length: 25:18
- Label: Independent
- Producer: Little Ghost

'Little Ghost' is the self-titled second EP by the British rock band Little Ghost. The release represented a shift in style from the band's first EP instead focusing on layered psychedelic pop songs with a lighter production style. The EP was released for free download and helped the band build a small international fan-base due to extensive self-promotion on social media.

The EP was released to lukewarm reviews from independent music journalist's and bloggers. Whilst the songwriting was praised, criticism was aimed at the overall sound quality or the recording with The Sound Of Confusion writing the following:

You can tell that effort has been put into songs like 'I Am A Party' and the rockier 'Tigerlilly'. This is fairy run-of-the-mill stuff, but there's potential here to go much further. The songs are pretty good, but suggest he can do better, and if a producer was brought in to give this EP a kick up the arse it could really come to life. It is slightly held back by being a little flat, but it could become much more with a band and better equipment. 'Planemo' is a sweet song regardless, and so to is 'Aura'. We know little about the project, but are assuming it's all fairly DIY and in its early stages, however, the songs are designed to be more than lo-fi tracks, they want to be bigger, especially the likes of the excellent 'The Fear' which almost does the job on its own, and if Little Ghost can get the ear of a decent producer on board they have the ability to make the step up.

== Track listing ==
All tracks are written by Louis Cooper-Hughes.

No.	Title	Length
1.	"I Am A Party"	3:29
2.	"Tigerlilly"	3:17
3.	"Planemo"	4:05
4.	"Aura"	1:57
5.	"The Fear"	6:36
6.	"Apparently...You're Angry"	3.05
7.	"Pretty / Slurred / Words (Hidden Track)"	1.24
