= Little Ghost (band) =

British alternative rock band

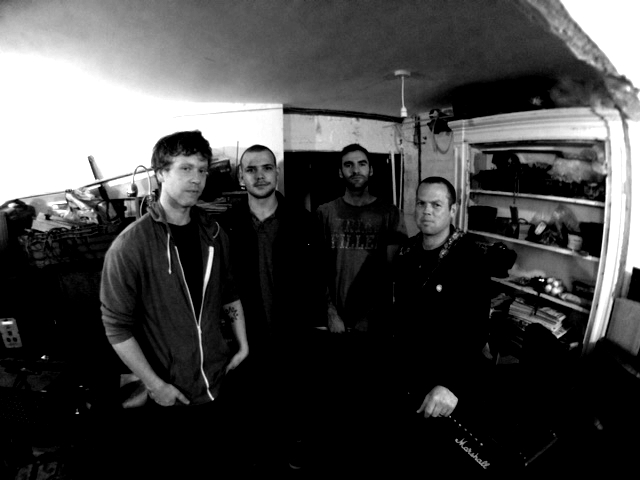
- From left to right: Matthew Foden, Louis James, Chris Greenhalgh, Matthew Davies.

Background information
- Origin: Shropshire, England
- Genres: alternative rock; dance-punk; Indie rock; psychedelic rock
- Years active: 2013–present
- Label: Independent
- Members: Louis James; Matthew Foden; Chris Greenhalgh
- Past members: Mickey Evans; Olly James; Ryan O'Connor; Matthew Davies
- Website: http://littleghostmusic.bandcamp.com

Little Ghost are a British alternative rock band formed in Shropshire in 2012. The band's music has been described as blend of indie rock, dance-punk and indie pop. As of 2017, Little Ghost are unsigned and release all of their music independently.

== History ==
The band initially began with the release of two self-produced EP's in 2013. With the use of social media they were able to build a small underground following.

June 2014 saw the release of Little Ghost's first music video for the track 'Hornets', the video was produced by the independent media outfit Step-One Media and was soon followed by the band's 3rd EP entitled Queen Bee. The 7-track release was released to moderate critical acclaim for its diverse and experimental sound juxtaposed with pop-music sensibilities and has received positive reviews including an 8/10 from U&I Music Magazine and a 4.8 rating on Sputnikmusic. Their song 'Queen Bee' was selected by musician George Barnett to be featured on Huw Stephens' BBC Introducing Show on BBC Radio One in October of that year.

In August 2014 the band announced their intention to begin performing for the first time across the UK with possible new music to emerge in 2015.

Little Ghost released a single on 15 June entitled 'Tiny Little Flicker'. Around this time they introduced three new songs into their live set, 'Tiny Little Flicker', 'Ladies And Gentlemen' and 'Carpe Diem Yourself'. On 14 September they released their debut album Versus. The album's release coincided with small UK tour with co-headliners City Of Ashes and A Mouth Full Of Matches.

On 17 June 2017, the band announced the departure of guitarist Mickey Evans and bass player Ryan O'Connor. They both performed their final gig with the band at The Star Hotel in Whitchurch. In September of that year they announced that Matthew Davies of 10k Runner and Matthew Foden of The World's Hatred had joined Little Ghost as bassist and guitarist respectively. In 2020 the band announced that Davies would be leaving and that they were to continue as a three-piece.

In January 2021, Little Ghost released their first new single in five years, 'Lilo'. The bands description of the song was "a taste of things to come".

== Discography ==
=== Studio albums ===
- Versus (2015)

=== Extended plays ===
- Subculture EP (2013)
- Little Ghost EP (2013)
- Queen Bee EP (2014)

=== Live albums ===
- Lifeboats – Live & Stripped (limited edition EP, 2014)
- Live at BBC Radio Shropshire (only available for streaming on the band's SoundCloud page, 2014)
- Live at The Star Hotel (2016)

=== Singles ===
- "Finish You Off" (December 2012)
- "Apparently...You're Angry" (May 2013)
- "I Am a Party" (June 2013)
- "Hornets / Daydreams" (May 2014)
- "Queen Bee/Blackpool Twice" (May 2014)
- "Tiny Little Flicker" (June 2015)
- "Carpe Diem Yourself" (August 2015)
- "Nightcrawlers" (August 2015)
- "Bloody Murder / Shotgun Wedding" (October 2015)
- "Lilo" (January 2021)

== Band members ==
Current:

- Louis Cooper-Hughes (Lead Vocals, Guitar, Keys) [2012–present]
- Matthew Foden (Bass Guitar, Vocals, Guitar) [2017–present]
- Chris Greenhalgh (Drums, Vocals, Guitar) [2015–present]

Former:

- Mickey Evans (Guitar) [2013-2017]
- Olly James (Drums) [2014-2015]
- Matthew Davies (Bass Guitar) [2017-2020]
- Ryan O'Connor (Bass Guitar) [2013-2017]
