= Phags-pa (Unicode block) =

- Range: U+A840..U+A87F (64 code points)
- Plane: BMP
- Scripts: Phags Pa
- Major alphabets: Mongolian; Chinese
- Assigned: 56 code points
- Unused: 8 reserved code points

Unicode version history
- 5.0 (2006): 56 (+56)

Unicode documentation
- Code chart ∣ Web page

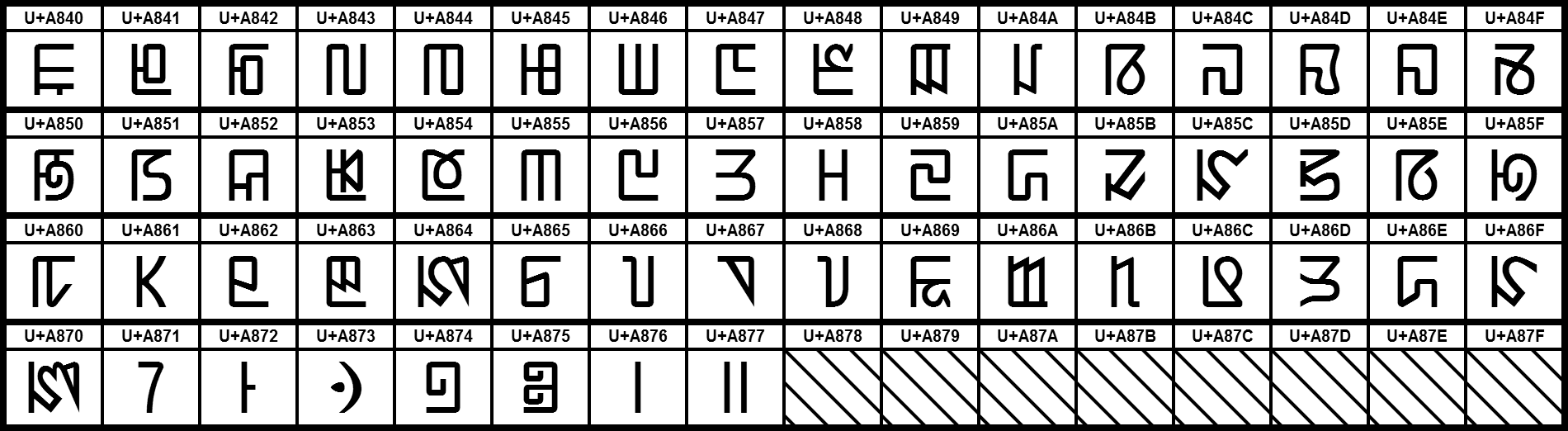
Graphical representation of the Phags-pa Unicode block

Phags-pa is a Unicode block containing characters from the 'Phags-pa script promulgated as a national script by Kublai Khan, the founder of the Yuan dynasty. It was used primarily in writing Mongolian and Chinese, although it was intended for the use of all written languages of the Mongol Empire.

== Block ==
Phags-pa^{[1]}^{[2]} Official Unicode Consortium code chart (PDF)
	0	1	2	3	4	5	6	7	8	9	A	B	C	D	E	F
U+A84x	ꡀ	ꡁ	ꡂ	ꡃ	ꡄ	ꡅ	ꡆ	ꡇ	ꡈ	ꡉ	ꡊ	ꡋ	ꡌ	ꡍ	ꡎ	ꡏ
U+A85x	ꡐ	ꡑ	ꡒ	ꡓ	ꡔ	ꡕ	ꡖ	ꡗ	ꡘ	ꡙ	ꡚ	ꡛ	ꡜ	ꡝ	ꡞ	ꡟ
U+A86x	ꡠ	ꡡ	ꡢ	ꡣ	ꡤ	ꡥ	ꡦ	ꡧ	ꡨ	ꡩ	ꡪ	ꡫ	ꡬ	ꡭ	ꡮ	ꡯ
U+A87x	ꡰ	ꡱ	ꡲ	ꡳ	꡴	꡵	꡶	꡷								
Notes 1.As of Unicode version 17.0 2.Grey areas indicate non-assigned code points

The block has six variation sequences defined for standardized variants. They use U+FE00 VARIATION SELECTOR-1 (VS01):

Variation sequences for reversed shaping
U+	Character	Base code point	Base + VS01
A856	Phags‑Pa Letter Small A	ꡖ	ꡖ︀
A85C	Phags‑Pa Letter Ha	ꡜ	ꡜ︀
A85E	Phags‑Pa Letter I	ꡞ	ꡞ︀
A85F	Phags‑Pa Letter U	ꡟ	ꡟ︀
A860	Phags‑Pa Letter E	ꡠ	ꡠ︀
A868	Phags‑Pa Subjoined Letter Ya	ꡨ	ꡨ︀

Note that four vowel letters have positional variants:

Positional forms of I, U, E, and O
U+	Character	Orientation	Isolate	Initial	Medial	Final
U+A85E	Phags‑Pa Letter I	regular	ꡞ	ꡞ‍	‍ꡞ‍	‍ꡞ
U+A85E	Phags‑Pa Letter I	reversed	ꡞ︀	ꡞ︀‍	‍ꡞ︀‍	‍ꡞ︀
U+A85F	Phags‑Pa Letter U	regular	ꡟ	ꡟ‍	‍ꡟ‍	‍ꡟ
U+A85F	Phags‑Pa Letter U	reversed	ꡟ︀	ꡟ︀‍	‍ꡟ︀‍	‍ꡟ︀
U+A860	Phags‑Pa Letter E	regular	ꡠ	ꡠ‍	‍ꡠ‍	‍ꡠ
U+A860	Phags‑Pa Letter E	reversed	ꡠ︀	ꡠ︀‍	‍ꡠ︀‍	‍ꡠ︀
U+A861	Phags‑Pa Letter O	regular	ꡡ	ꡡ‍	‍ꡡ‍	‍ꡡ

== History ==
The following Unicode-related documents record the purpose and process of defining specific characters in the Phags-pa block:

Version	Final code points (Note: Proposed code points and characters names may differ from final code points and names)	Count	L2 ID	WG2 ID	Document
5.0	U+A840..A877	56	L2/00-055	N2163 (pdf, doc)	Sato, T. K. (2000-01-06), Soyombo and Pagba (old Mongol scripts)
5.0	U+A840..A877	56	L2/03-224		Baxter, William H. (2003-07-10), Email on 'Phags-pa
5.0	U+A840..A877	56	L2/03-246		Quejingzhabu; West, Andrew (2003-08-12), Letter commenting on Phags-pa encoding
5.0	U+A840..A877	56	L2/03-269		West, Andrew; Fynn, Christopher (2003-08-16), E-mail questions and answers on Phags-pa encoding
5.0	U+A840..A877	56	L2/03-229R3	N2622	West, Andrew (2003-09-18), Proposal to encode the Phags-pa script
5.0	U+A840..A877	56	L2/03-366	N2666	Principles on Encoding Phags-pa Script, 2003-10-20
5.0	U+A840..A877	56	L2/03-374		West, Andrew (2003-10-22), Response to N2666 (Principles on Encoding Phags-pa Script)
5.0	U+A840..A877	56		N2912	Constable, Peter (2004-01-22), Open Issues on Phags-pa Encoding
5.0	U+A840..A877	56	L2/04-085	N2706	Summary of Voting on ISO/IEC JTC 1/SC 2 N 3696 : Project Subdivision Proposal for ISO/IEC 10646: 2003/Amendment 1, 2004-02-03
5.0	U+A840..A877	56	L2/04-112	N2719	West, Andrew (2004-03-10), Response to Comments on Phags-pa Proposal in N2706
5.0	U+A840..A877	56	L2/04-134	N2745	HPhags-pa script encoding, 2004-04-02
5.0	U+A840..A877	56	L2/04-174	N2771	West, Andrew (2004-06-01), Comments on Chinese-Mongolian joint proposal to encode the Hphags-pa script (N2475)
5.0	U+A840..A877	56	L2/04-275	N2829	Chen, Zhuang; Jia, La Sen; He, Xi Ge Du Ren; Tumurtogoo, Domi; Everson, Michael; Sekiguchi; Constable, Peter; Whistler, Ken; Freytag, Asmus (2004-06-22), Consensus on the encoding of the Phags-pa script in the PDAM code chart
5.0	U+A840..A877	56	L2/04-414	N2870	Summary of the Revised User's Agreement Related to Phags-pa Script, 2004-10-25
5.0	U+A840..A877	56	L2/04-412	N2869	Proposal to Encode the Phags-Pa Script, 2004-11-17
5.0	U+A840..A877	56	L2/04-413	N2869c	Cover letter to Updated proposal to encode the Phags-pa Script, 2004-11-17
5.0	U+A840..A877	56	L2/04-415	N2871	Some Problems on the Encoding of the Phags-pa Script, 2004-11-17
5.0	U+A840..A877	56	L2/05-036	N2922	Consensus on Encoding Phags-pa Script, 2005-01-25
5.0	U+A840..A877	56	L2/05-059		Whistler, Ken (2005-02-03), "1. Phags-pa", WG2 Consent Docket, Part 2: Unicode 5.0 Issues
5.0	U+A840..A877	56	L2/05-026		Moore, Lisa (2005-05-16), "WG2 - Unicode 5.0 Consent Docket (B.1.16)", UTC #102 Minutes
5.0	U+A840..A877	56	L2/05-219	N2964	A User's Agreement Related to Phags-pa Script, 2005-08-05
5.0	U+A840..A877	56	L2/05-255	N2972	West, Andrew (2005-08-17), Glyph Forms for PHAGS-PA LETTER YA and PHAGS-PA LETTER ALTERNATE YA
5.0	U+A840..A877	56	L2/05-257	N2979	West, Andrew (2005-09-01), Phags-pa Glyphs
5.0	U+A840..A877	56	L2/05-270		Whistler, Ken (2005-09-21), "F. Phags-pa Glyphs", WG2 Consent Docket (Sophia Antipolis)
5.0	U+A840..A877	56	L2/05-279		Moore, Lisa (2005-11-10), "Consensus 105-C29", UTC #105 Minutes
5.0	U+A840..A877	56		N2953 (pdf, doc)	Umamaheswaran, V. S. (2006-02-16), "7.2.1", Unconfirmed minutes of WG 2 meeting 47, Sophia Antipolis, France; 2005-09-12/15
5.0	U+A840..A877	56	L2/12-360		Esfahbod, Behdad; Pournader, Roozbeh (2012-11-05), Mongolian and 'Phags-Pa Shaping
5.0	U+A840..A877	56	L2/12-343R2		Moore, Lisa (2012-12-04), "B.14.5 Mongolian Shaping", UTC #133 Minutes
5.0	U+A840..A877	56	L2/13-146	N4435	Suignard, Michel (2013-05-27), Presentation of vertical scripts
5.0	U+A840..A877	56	L2/13-132		Moore, Lisa (2013-07-29), "B.1.7 Presentation of vertical scripts", UTC #136 Minutes
5.0	U+A840..A877	56		N4403 (pdf, doc)	Umamaheswaran, V. S. (2014-01-28), "11.1.2 Presentation of Vertical scripts (Mongolian and Phags-pa)", Unconfirmed minutes of WG 2 meeting 61, Holiday Inn, Vilnius, Lithuania; 2013-06-10/14
5.0	U+A840..A877	56	L2/18-278		Dyi-Yuaan, Lo (2018-08-30), A Glyph Error of 'Phags-pa Alternate YA (U+A86D)
5.0	U+A840..A877	56	L2/18-280	N5012	West, Andrew (2018-08-30), Discussion of 'Glyph Error of 'Phags-pa Alternate YA'
5.0	U+A840..A877	56	L2/18-272		Moore, Lisa (2018-10-29), "C.5.1 A Glyph Error of 'Phags-pa Alternate YA (U+A86D)", UTC #157 Minutes
