= Vers =

Vers may refer to:

== Places in France ==
- Vers, Haute-Savoie, a commune in the Haute-Savoie département
- Vers, Lot, a commune in the Lot département
- Vers, Saône-et-Loire, a commune in the Saône-et-Loire département
- Vers-en-Montagne, a commune in the Jura département
- Vers-Pont-du-Gard, a commune in the Gard département
- Vers-sous-Sellières, a commune in the Jura département
- Vers-sur-Méouge, a commune in the Drôme département
- Vers-sur-Selles, a commune in the Somme département

== Rivers ==
- Vers (Lahn), a river of Hesse, Germany
- Vers (Lot), a river of southern France, tributary of the Lot

== Other uses ==
- Vers, an abbreviation for the trigonometric function versine
- Vers, an abbreviation for versatile, commonly used in Western gay male culture
- VERS, an acronym for Victorian Electronic Records Strategy, a system for records management
- Vers, an alias for Carol Danvers in the 2019 superhero film Captain Marvel
