= Tatsuo Kobayashi =

Japanese web architect (born 1951)

Tatsuo Kobayashi (小林龍生, Kobayashi Tatsuo; born 1951) is a Japanese web architect who specializes in international standardization.

Born and raised in Tokyo, he studied history and philosophy of science at the University of Tokyo. After graduating from the university, he joined Shogakukan Inc. and started working as an editor. In 1989, he moved to JustSystems Corporation, and got involved in product planning. Setting his goal on the fusion of technology and lingual cultures, he established a supervising committee for promoting ATOK (Advanced Technology Of Kana-kanji Transfer), which is the trademark of JustSystems and is a kana-kanji conversion software.

Representing JustSystems, he has been a regular member at the Unicode Technical Committee to handle issues related to character sets. Also, as a member of the Japan Committee for ISO/IEC JTC1/SC2, and the chair of the Japan Committee for ISO/IEC JTC1/SC2/WG2/IRG, he contributed to formulating ISO.

== Works ==
=== Standardization projects ===
- In 1997, he became Director of the Unicode Consortium.
- In 1999 he founded Scholex and became an Executive Officer in April 2001.
- In March 2001, he made a presentation for the “Language Diversity in Network Society” held by the French Commission for UNESCO in Paris, and in September 2001, for the “Language in Cyberspace” held by the Korean Commission for UNESCO in Seoul.
- Between 2004 through 2010, he took the chairmanship of ISO/IEC JTC1/SC2.
- Since 2006, he has been Chairman of W3C Japanese Text Layout Task Force.
- Since 2010, he has been a member of the board of directors at the IVS(Ideographic Variation Sequence) Technology Promotion Council.
- In 2011, he was appointed Fellow of the Japan Electronic Publishing Association (JEPA)

=== Participating committees ===
- JSC2 Committee of Information Technology Standards Commission of Japan (ITSCJ) of the Information Processing Society of Japan (IPSJ) （ISO/IEC JTC1/SC2 and JTC1/SC2/WG2）

=== Books ===
- Unicode Senki (ユニコード戦記) (Unicode war chronicle) (2011/6/10) ISBN 4-501-54970-X
- Internet jidai no moji code (インターネット時代の文字コード) (Character Code in the Internet era) (author & editor) (2002/01) ISBN 4-320-12038-8
- Tabogurafikkusu (ターボグラフィックス) (Turbo graphics) (coauthor)
- Dennou Bunka to Kanji no Yukue (電脳文化と漢字のゆくえ) (Cyberculture and whereabouts of Kanji) （coauthor）
- Bunka-toshiteno IT Kakumei (文化としてのIT革命) (IT revolution as a culture)（coauthor）

=== Awards ===
- Bulldog Award, September 1999
