= CJK Unified Ideographs Extension H =

- Range: U+31350..U+323AF (4,192 code points)
- Plane: TIP
- Scripts: Han
- Assigned: 4,192 code points
- Unused: 0 reserved code points

Unicode Version History
- 15.0 (2022): 4,192 (+4,192)

Unicode documentation
- Code chart ∣ Web page

CJK Unified Ideographs Extension H is a Unicode block containing rare and historic CJK Unified Ideographs for Chinese, Japanese, Korean, Sawndip, and Vietnamese submitted to the Ideographic Research Group during 2017.

== Block ==
CJK Unified Ideographs Extension H^{[1]} Official Unicode Consortium code chart (PDF)
	0	1	2	3	4	5	6	7	8	9	A	B	C	D	E	F
U+3135x	𱍐	𱍑	𱍒	𱍓	𱍔	𱍕	𱍖	𱍗	𱍘	𱍙	𱍚	𱍛	𱍜	𱍝	𱍞	𱍟
U+3136x	𱍠	𱍡	𱍢	𱍣	𱍤	𱍥	𱍦	𱍧	𱍨	𱍩	𱍪	𱍫	𱍬	𱍭	𱍮	𱍯
U+3137x	𱍰	𱍱	𱍲	𱍳	𱍴	𱍵	𱍶	𱍷	𱍸	𱍹	𱍺	𱍻	𱍼	𱍽	𱍾	𱍿
U+3138x	𱎀	𱎁	𱎂	𱎃	𱎄	𱎅	𱎆	𱎇	𱎈	𱎉	𱎊	𱎋	𱎌	𱎍	𱎎	𱎏
U+3139x	𱎐	𱎑	𱎒	𱎓	𱎔	𱎕	𱎖	𱎗	𱎘	𱎙	𱎚	𱎛	𱎜	𱎝	𱎞	𱎟
U+313Ax	𱎠	𱎡	𱎢	𱎣	𱎤	𱎥	𱎦	𱎧	𱎨	𱎩	𱎪	𱎫	𱎬	𱎭	𱎮	𱎯
U+313Bx	𱎰	𱎱	𱎲	𱎳	𱎴	𱎵	𱎶	𱎷	𱎸	𱎹	𱎺	𱎻	𱎼	𱎽	𱎾	𱎿
U+313Cx	𱏀	𱏁	𱏂	𱏃	𱏄	𱏅	𱏆	𱏇	𱏈	𱏉	𱏊	𱏋	𱏌	𱏍	𱏎	𱏏
U+313Dx	𱏐	𱏑	𱏒	𱏓	𱏔	𱏕	𱏖	𱏗	𱏘	𱏙	𱏚	𱏛	𱏜	𱏝	𱏞	𱏟
U+313Ex	𱏠	𱏡	𱏢	𱏣	𱏤	𱏥	𱏦	𱏧	𱏨	𱏩	𱏪	𱏫	𱏬	𱏭	𱏮	𱏯
U+313Fx	𱏰	𱏱	𱏲	𱏳	𱏴	𱏵	𱏶	𱏷	𱏸	𱏹	𱏺	𱏻	𱏼	𱏽	𱏾	𱏿
U+3140x	𱐀	𱐁	𱐂	𱐃	𱐄	𱐅	𱐆	𱐇	𱐈	𱐉	𱐊	𱐋	𱐌	𱐍	𱐎	𱐏
U+3141x	𱐐	𱐑	𱐒	𱐓	𱐔	𱐕	𱐖	𱐗	𱐘	𱐙	𱐚	𱐛	𱐜	𱐝	𱐞	𱐟
U+3142x	𱐠	𱐡	𱐢	𱐣	𱐤	𱐥	𱐦	𱐧	𱐨	𱐩	𱐪	𱐫	𱐬	𱐭	𱐮	𱐯
U+3143x	𱐰	𱐱	𱐲	𱐳	𱐴	𱐵	𱐶	𱐷	𱐸	𱐹	𱐺	𱐻	𱐼	𱐽	𱐾	𱐿
U+3144x	𱑀	𱑁	𱑂	𱑃	𱑄	𱑅	𱑆	𱑇	𱑈	𱑉	𱑊	𱑋	𱑌	𱑍	𱑎	𱑏
U+3145x	𱑐	𱑑	𱑒	𱑓	𱑔	𱑕	𱑖	𱑗	𱑘	𱑙	𱑚	𱑛	𱑜	𱑝	𱑞	𱑟
U+3146x	𱑠	𱑡	𱑢	𱑣	𱑤	𱑥	𱑦	𱑧	𱑨	𱑩	𱑪	𱑫	𱑬	𱑭	𱑮	𱑯
U+3147x	𱑰	𱑱	𱑲	𱑳	𱑴	𱑵	𱑶	𱑷	𱑸	𱑹	𱑺	𱑻	𱑼	𱑽	𱑾	𱑿
U+3148x	𱒀	𱒁	𱒂	𱒃	𱒄	𱒅	𱒆	𱒇	𱒈	𱒉	𱒊	𱒋	𱒌	𱒍	𱒎	𱒏
U+3149x	𱒐	𱒑	𱒒	𱒓	𱒔	𱒕	𱒖	𱒗	𱒘	𱒙	𱒚	𱒛	𱒜	𱒝	𱒞	𱒟
U+314Ax	𱒠	𱒡	𱒢	𱒣	𱒤	𱒥	𱒦	𱒧	𱒨	𱒩	𱒪	𱒫	𱒬	𱒭	𱒮	𱒯
U+314Bx	𱒰	𱒱	𱒲	𱒳	𱒴	𱒵	𱒶	𱒷	𱒸	𱒹	𱒺	𱒻	𱒼	𱒽	𱒾	𱒿
U+314Cx	𱓀	𱓁	𱓂	𱓃	𱓄	𱓅	𱓆	𱓇	𱓈	𱓉	𱓊	𱓋	𱓌	𱓍	𱓎	𱓏
U+314Dx	𱓐	𱓑	𱓒	𱓓	𱓔	𱓕	𱓖	𱓗	𱓘	𱓙	𱓚	𱓛	𱓜	𱓝	𱓞	𱓟
U+314Ex	𱓠	𱓡	𱓢	𱓣	𱓤	𱓥	𱓦	𱓧	𱓨	𱓩	𱓪	𱓫	𱓬	𱓭	𱓮	𱓯
U+314Fx	𱓰	𱓱	𱓲	𱓳	𱓴	𱓵	𱓶	𱓷	𱓸	𱓹	𱓺	𱓻	𱓼	𱓽	𱓾	𱓿
U+3150x	𱔀	𱔁	𱔂	𱔃	𱔄	𱔅	𱔆	𱔇	𱔈	𱔉	𱔊	𱔋	𱔌	𱔍	𱔎	𱔏
U+3151x	𱔐	𱔑	𱔒	𱔓	𱔔	𱔕	𱔖	𱔗	𱔘	𱔙	𱔚	𱔛	𱔜	𱔝	𱔞	𱔟
U+3152x	𱔠	𱔡	𱔢	𱔣	𱔤	𱔥	𱔦	𱔧	𱔨	𱔩	𱔪	𱔫	𱔬	𱔭	𱔮	𱔯
U+3153x	𱔰	𱔱	𱔲	𱔳	𱔴	𱔵	𱔶	𱔷	𱔸	𱔹	𱔺	𱔻	𱔼	𱔽	𱔾	𱔿
U+3154x	𱕀	𱕁	𱕂	𱕃	𱕄	𱕅	𱕆	𱕇	𱕈	𱕉	𱕊	𱕋	𱕌	𱕍	𱕎	𱕏
U+3155x	𱕐	𱕑	𱕒	𱕓	𱕔	𱕕	𱕖	𱕗	𱕘	𱕙	𱕚	𱕛	𱕜	𱕝	𱕞	𱕟
U+3156x	𱕠	𱕡	𱕢	𱕣	𱕤	𱕥	𱕦	𱕧	𱕨	𱕩	𱕪	𱕫	𱕬	𱕭	𱕮	𱕯
U+3157x	𱕰	𱕱	𱕲	𱕳	𱕴	𱕵	𱕶	𱕷	𱕸	𱕹	𱕺	𱕻	𱕼	𱕽	𱕾	𱕿
U+3158x	𱖀	𱖁	𱖂	𱖃	𱖄	𱖅	𱖆	𱖇	𱖈	𱖉	𱖊	𱖋	𱖌	𱖍	𱖎	𱖏
U+3159x	𱖐	𱖑	𱖒	𱖓	𱖔	𱖕	𱖖	𱖗	𱖘	𱖙	𱖚	𱖛	𱖜	𱖝	𱖞	𱖟
U+315Ax	𱖠	𱖡	𱖢	𱖣	𱖤	𱖥	𱖦	𱖧	𱖨	𱖩	𱖪	𱖫	𱖬	𱖭	𱖮	𱖯
U+315Bx	𱖰	𱖱	𱖲	𱖳	𱖴	𱖵	𱖶	𱖷	𱖸	𱖹	𱖺	𱖻	𱖼	𱖽	𱖾	𱖿
U+315Cx	𱗀	𱗁	𱗂	𱗃	𱗄	𱗅	𱗆	𱗇	𱗈	𱗉	𱗊	𱗋	𱗌	𱗍	𱗎	𱗏
U+315Dx	𱗐	𱗑	𱗒	𱗓	𱗔	𱗕	𱗖	𱗗	𱗘	𱗙	𱗚	𱗛	𱗜	𱗝	𱗞	𱗟
U+315Ex	𱗠	𱗡	𱗢	𱗣	𱗤	𱗥	𱗦	𱗧	𱗨	𱗩	𱗪	𱗫	𱗬	𱗭	𱗮	𱗯
U+315Fx	𱗰	𱗱	𱗲	𱗳	𱗴	𱗵	𱗶	𱗷	𱗸	𱗹	𱗺	𱗻	𱗼	𱗽	𱗾	𱗿
U+3160x	𱘀	𱘁	𱘂	𱘃	𱘄	𱘅	𱘆	𱘇	𱘈	𱘉	𱘊	𱘋	𱘌	𱘍	𱘎	𱘏
U+3161x	𱘐	𱘑	𱘒	𱘓	𱘔	𱘕	𱘖	𱘗	𱘘	𱘙	𱘚	𱘛	𱘜	𱘝	𱘞	𱘟
U+3162x	𱘠	𱘡	𱘢	𱘣	𱘤	𱘥	𱘦	𱘧	𱘨	𱘩	𱘪	𱘫	𱘬	𱘭	𱘮	𱘯
U+3163x	𱘰	𱘱	𱘲	𱘳	𱘴	𱘵	𱘶	𱘷	𱘸	𱘹	𱘺	𱘻	𱘼	𱘽	𱘾	𱘿
U+3164x	𱙀	𱙁	𱙂	𱙃	𱙄	𱙅	𱙆	𱙇	𱙈	𱙉	𱙊	𱙋	𱙌	𱙍	𱙎	𱙏
U+3165x	𱙐	𱙑	𱙒	𱙓	𱙔	𱙕	𱙖	𱙗	𱙘	𱙙	𱙚	𱙛	𱙜	𱙝	𱙞	𱙟
U+3166x	𱙠	𱙡	𱙢	𱙣	𱙤	𱙥	𱙦	𱙧	𱙨	𱙩	𱙪	𱙫	𱙬	𱙭	𱙮	𱙯
U+3167x	𱙰	𱙱	𱙲	𱙳	𱙴	𱙵	𱙶	𱙷	𱙸	𱙹	𱙺	𱙻	𱙼	𱙽	𱙾	𱙿
U+3168x	𱚀	𱚁	𱚂	𱚃	𱚄	𱚅	𱚆	𱚇	𱚈	𱚉	𱚊	𱚋	𱚌	𱚍	𱚎	𱚏
U+3169x	𱚐	𱚑	𱚒	𱚓	𱚔	𱚕	𱚖	𱚗	𱚘	𱚙	𱚚	𱚛	𱚜	𱚝	𱚞	𱚟
U+316Ax	𱚠	𱚡	𱚢	𱚣	𱚤	𱚥	𱚦	𱚧	𱚨	𱚩	𱚪	𱚫	𱚬	𱚭	𱚮	𱚯
U+316Bx	𱚰	𱚱	𱚲	𱚳	𱚴	𱚵	𱚶	𱚷	𱚸	𱚹	𱚺	𱚻	𱚼	𱚽	𱚾	𱚿
U+316Cx	𱛀	𱛁	𱛂	𱛃	𱛄	𱛅	𱛆	𱛇	𱛈	𱛉	𱛊	𱛋	𱛌	𱛍	𱛎	𱛏
U+316Dx	𱛐	𱛑	𱛒	𱛓	𱛔	𱛕	𱛖	𱛗	𱛘	𱛙	𱛚	𱛛	𱛜	𱛝	𱛞	𱛟
U+316Ex	𱛠	𱛡	𱛢	𱛣	𱛤	𱛥	𱛦	𱛧	𱛨	𱛩	𱛪	𱛫	𱛬	𱛭	𱛮	𱛯
U+316Fx	𱛰	𱛱	𱛲	𱛳	𱛴	𱛵	𱛶	𱛷	𱛸	𱛹	𱛺	𱛻	𱛼	𱛽	𱛾	𱛿
U+3170x	𱜀	𱜁	𱜂	𱜃	𱜄	𱜅	𱜆	𱜇	𱜈	𱜉	𱜊	𱜋	𱜌	𱜍	𱜎	𱜏
U+3171x	𱜐	𱜑	𱜒	𱜓	𱜔	𱜕	𱜖	𱜗	𱜘	𱜙	𱜚	𱜛	𱜜	𱜝	𱜞	𱜟
U+3172x	𱜠	𱜡	𱜢	𱜣	𱜤	𱜥	𱜦	𱜧	𱜨	𱜩	𱜪	𱜫	𱜬	𱜭	𱜮	𱜯
U+3173x	𱜰	𱜱	𱜲	𱜳	𱜴	𱜵	𱜶	𱜷	𱜸	𱜹	𱜺	𱜻	𱜼	𱜽	𱜾	𱜿
U+3174x	𱝀	𱝁	𱝂	𱝃	𱝄	𱝅	𱝆	𱝇	𱝈	𱝉	𱝊	𱝋	𱝌	𱝍	𱝎	𱝏
U+3175x	𱝐	𱝑	𱝒	𱝓	𱝔	𱝕	𱝖	𱝗	𱝘	𱝙	𱝚	𱝛	𱝜	𱝝	𱝞	𱝟
U+3176x	𱝠	𱝡	𱝢	𱝣	𱝤	𱝥	𱝦	𱝧	𱝨	𱝩	𱝪	𱝫	𱝬	𱝭	𱝮	𱝯
U+3177x	𱝰	𱝱	𱝲	𱝳	𱝴	𱝵	𱝶	𱝷	𱝸	𱝹	𱝺	𱝻	𱝼	𱝽	𱝾	𱝿
U+3178x	𱞀	𱞁	𱞂	𱞃	𱞄	𱞅	𱞆	𱞇	𱞈	𱞉	𱞊	𱞋	𱞌	𱞍	𱞎	𱞏
U+3179x	𱞐	𱞑	𱞒	𱞓	𱞔	𱞕	𱞖	𱞗	𱞘	𱞙	𱞚	𱞛	𱞜	𱞝	𱞞	𱞟
U+317Ax	𱞠	𱞡	𱞢	𱞣	𱞤	𱞥	𱞦	𱞧	𱞨	𱞩	𱞪	𱞫	𱞬	𱞭	𱞮	𱞯
U+317Bx	𱞰	𱞱	𱞲	𱞳	𱞴	𱞵	𱞶	𱞷	𱞸	𱞹	𱞺	𱞻	𱞼	𱞽	𱞾	𱞿
U+317Cx	𱟀	𱟁	𱟂	𱟃	𱟄	𱟅	𱟆	𱟇	𱟈	𱟉	𱟊	𱟋	𱟌	𱟍	𱟎	𱟏
U+317Dx	𱟐	𱟑	𱟒	𱟓	𱟔	𱟕	𱟖	𱟗	𱟘	𱟙	𱟚	𱟛	𱟜	𱟝	𱟞	𱟟
U+317Ex	𱟠	𱟡	𱟢	𱟣	𱟤	𱟥	𱟦	𱟧	𱟨	𱟩	𱟪	𱟫	𱟬	𱟭	𱟮	𱟯
U+317Fx	𱟰	𱟱	𱟲	𱟳	𱟴	𱟵	𱟶	𱟷	𱟸	𱟹	𱟺	𱟻	𱟼	𱟽	𱟾	𱟿
U+3180x	𱠀	𱠁	𱠂	𱠃	𱠄	𱠅	𱠆	𱠇	𱠈	𱠉	𱠊	𱠋	𱠌	𱠍	𱠎	𱠏
U+3181x	𱠐	𱠑	𱠒	𱠓	𱠔	𱠕	𱠖	𱠗	𱠘	𱠙	𱠚	𱠛	𱠜	𱠝	𱠞	𱠟
U+3182x	𱠠	𱠡	𱠢	𱠣	𱠤	𱠥	𱠦	𱠧	𱠨	𱠩	𱠪	𱠫	𱠬	𱠭	𱠮	𱠯
U+3183x	𱠰	𱠱	𱠲	𱠳	𱠴	𱠵	𱠶	𱠷	𱠸	𱠹	𱠺	𱠻	𱠼	𱠽	𱠾	𱠿
U+3184x	𱡀	𱡁	𱡂	𱡃	𱡄	𱡅	𱡆	𱡇	𱡈	𱡉	𱡊	𱡋	𱡌	𱡍	𱡎	𱡏
U+3185x	𱡐	𱡑	𱡒	𱡓	𱡔	𱡕	𱡖	𱡗	𱡘	𱡙	𱡚	𱡛	𱡜	𱡝	𱡞	𱡟
U+3186x	𱡠	𱡡	𱡢	𱡣	𱡤	𱡥	𱡦	𱡧	𱡨	𱡩	𱡪	𱡫	𱡬	𱡭	𱡮	𱡯
U+3187x	𱡰	𱡱	𱡲	𱡳	𱡴	𱡵	𱡶	𱡷	𱡸	𱡹	𱡺	𱡻	𱡼	𱡽	𱡾	𱡿
U+3188x	𱢀	𱢁	𱢂	𱢃	𱢄	𱢅	𱢆	𱢇	𱢈	𱢉	𱢊	𱢋	𱢌	𱢍	𱢎	𱢏
U+3189x	𱢐	𱢑	𱢒	𱢓	𱢔	𱢕	𱢖	𱢗	𱢘	𱢙	𱢚	𱢛	𱢜	𱢝	𱢞	𱢟
U+318Ax	𱢠	𱢡	𱢢	𱢣	𱢤	𱢥	𱢦	𱢧	𱢨	𱢩	𱢪	𱢫	𱢬	𱢭	𱢮	𱢯
U+318Bx	𱢰	𱢱	𱢲	𱢳	𱢴	𱢵	𱢶	𱢷	𱢸	𱢹	𱢺	𱢻	𱢼	𱢽	𱢾	𱢿
U+318Cx	𱣀	𱣁	𱣂	𱣃	𱣄	𱣅	𱣆	𱣇	𱣈	𱣉	𱣊	𱣋	𱣌	𱣍	𱣎	𱣏
U+318Dx	𱣐	𱣑	𱣒	𱣓	𱣔	𱣕	𱣖	𱣗	𱣘	𱣙	𱣚	𱣛	𱣜	𱣝	𱣞	𱣟
U+318Ex	𱣠	𱣡	𱣢	𱣣	𱣤	𱣥	𱣦	𱣧	𱣨	𱣩	𱣪	𱣫	𱣬	𱣭	𱣮	𱣯
U+318Fx	𱣰	𱣱	𱣲	𱣳	𱣴	𱣵	𱣶	𱣷	𱣸	𱣹	𱣺	𱣻	𱣼	𱣽	𱣾	𱣿
U+3190x	𱤀	𱤁	𱤂	𱤃	𱤄	𱤅	𱤆	𱤇	𱤈	𱤉	𱤊	𱤋	𱤌	𱤍	𱤎	𱤏
U+3191x	𱤐	𱤑	𱤒	𱤓	𱤔	𱤕	𱤖	𱤗	𱤘	𱤙	𱤚	𱤛	𱤜	𱤝	𱤞	𱤟
U+3192x	𱤠	𱤡	𱤢	𱤣	𱤤	𱤥	𱤦	𱤧	𱤨	𱤩	𱤪	𱤫	𱤬	𱤭	𱤮	𱤯
U+3193x	𱤰	𱤱	𱤲	𱤳	𱤴	𱤵	𱤶	𱤷	𱤸	𱤹	𱤺	𱤻	𱤼	𱤽	𱤾	𱤿
U+3194x	𱥀	𱥁	𱥂	𱥃	𱥄	𱥅	𱥆	𱥇	𱥈	𱥉	𱥊	𱥋	𱥌	𱥍	𱥎	𱥏
U+3195x	𱥐	𱥑	𱥒	𱥓	𱥔	𱥕	𱥖	𱥗	𱥘	𱥙	𱥚	𱥛	𱥜	𱥝	𱥞	𱥟
U+3196x	𱥠	𱥡	𱥢	𱥣	𱥤	𱥥	𱥦	𱥧	𱥨	𱥩	𱥪	𱥫	𱥬	𱥭	𱥮	𱥯
U+3197x	𱥰	𱥱	𱥲	𱥳	𱥴	𱥵	𱥶	𱥷	𱥸	𱥹	𱥺	𱥻	𱥼	𱥽	𱥾	𱥿
U+3198x	𱦀	𱦁	𱦂	𱦃	𱦄	𱦅	𱦆	𱦇	𱦈	𱦉	𱦊	𱦋	𱦌	𱦍	𱦎	𱦏
U+3199x	𱦐	𱦑	𱦒	𱦓	𱦔	𱦕	𱦖	𱦗	𱦘	𱦙	𱦚	𱦛	𱦜	𱦝	𱦞	𱦟
U+319Ax	𱦠	𱦡	𱦢	𱦣	𱦤	𱦥	𱦦	𱦧	𱦨	𱦩	𱦪	𱦫	𱦬	𱦭	𱦮	𱦯
U+319Bx	𱦰	𱦱	𱦲	𱦳	𱦴	𱦵	𱦶	𱦷	𱦸	𱦹	𱦺	𱦻	𱦼	𱦽	𱦾	𱦿
U+319Cx	𱧀	𱧁	𱧂	𱧃	𱧄	𱧅	𱧆	𱧇	𱧈	𱧉	𱧊	𱧋	𱧌	𱧍	𱧎	𱧏
U+319Dx	𱧐	𱧑	𱧒	𱧓	𱧔	𱧕	𱧖	𱧗	𱧘	𱧙	𱧚	𱧛	𱧜	𱧝	𱧞	𱧟
U+319Ex	𱧠	𱧡	𱧢	𱧣	𱧤	𱧥	𱧦	𱧧	𱧨	𱧩	𱧪	𱧫	𱧬	𱧭	𱧮	𱧯
U+319Fx	𱧰	𱧱	𱧲	𱧳	𱧴	𱧵	𱧶	𱧷	𱧸	𱧹	𱧺	𱧻	𱧼	𱧽	𱧾	𱧿
U+31A0x	𱨀	𱨁	𱨂	𱨃	𱨄	𱨅	𱨆	𱨇	𱨈	𱨉	𱨊	𱨋	𱨌	𱨍	𱨎	𱨏
U+31A1x	𱨐	𱨑	𱨒	𱨓	𱨔	𱨕	𱨖	𱨗	𱨘	𱨙	𱨚	𱨛	𱨜	𱨝	𱨞	𱨟
U+31A2x	𱨠	𱨡	𱨢	𱨣	𱨤	𱨥	𱨦	𱨧	𱨨	𱨩	𱨪	𱨫	𱨬	𱨭	𱨮	𱨯
U+31A3x	𱨰	𱨱	𱨲	𱨳	𱨴	𱨵	𱨶	𱨷	𱨸	𱨹	𱨺	𱨻	𱨼	𱨽	𱨾	𱨿
U+31A4x	𱩀	𱩁	𱩂	𱩃	𱩄	𱩅	𱩆	𱩇	𱩈	𱩉	𱩊	𱩋	𱩌	𱩍	𱩎	𱩏
U+31A5x	𱩐	𱩑	𱩒	𱩓	𱩔	𱩕	𱩖	𱩗	𱩘	𱩙	𱩚	𱩛	𱩜	𱩝	𱩞	𱩟
U+31A6x	𱩠	𱩡	𱩢	𱩣	𱩤	𱩥	𱩦	𱩧	𱩨	𱩩	𱩪	𱩫	𱩬	𱩭	𱩮	𱩯
U+31A7x	𱩰	𱩱	𱩲	𱩳	𱩴	𱩵	𱩶	𱩷	𱩸	𱩹	𱩺	𱩻	𱩼	𱩽	𱩾	𱩿
U+31A8x	𱪀	𱪁	𱪂	𱪃	𱪄	𱪅	𱪆	𱪇	𱪈	𱪉	𱪊	𱪋	𱪌	𱪍	𱪎	𱪏
U+31A9x	𱪐	𱪑	𱪒	𱪓	𱪔	𱪕	𱪖	𱪗	𱪘	𱪙	𱪚	𱪛	𱪜	𱪝	𱪞	𱪟
U+31AAx	𱪠	𱪡	𱪢	𱪣	𱪤	𱪥	𱪦	𱪧	𱪨	𱪩	𱪪	𱪫	𱪬	𱪭	𱪮	𱪯
U+31ABx	𱪰	𱪱	𱪲	𱪳	𱪴	𱪵	𱪶	𱪷	𱪸	𱪹	𱪺	𱪻	𱪼	𱪽	𱪾	𱪿
U+31ACx	𱫀	𱫁	𱫂	𱫃	𱫄	𱫅	𱫆	𱫇	𱫈	𱫉	𱫊	𱫋	𱫌	𱫍	𱫎	𱫏
U+31ADx	𱫐	𱫑	𱫒	𱫓	𱫔	𱫕	𱫖	𱫗	𱫘	𱫙	𱫚	𱫛	𱫜	𱫝	𱫞	𱫟
U+31AEx	𱫠	𱫡	𱫢	𱫣	𱫤	𱫥	𱫦	𱫧	𱫨	𱫩	𱫪	𱫫	𱫬	𱫭	𱫮	𱫯
U+31AFx	𱫰	𱫱	𱫲	𱫳	𱫴	𱫵	𱫶	𱫷	𱫸	𱫹	𱫺	𱫻	𱫼	𱫽	𱫾	𱫿
U+31B0x	𱬀	𱬁	𱬂	𱬃	𱬄	𱬅	𱬆	𱬇	𱬈	𱬉	𱬊	𱬋	𱬌	𱬍	𱬎	𱬏
U+31B1x	𱬐	𱬑	𱬒	𱬓	𱬔	𱬕	𱬖	𱬗	𱬘	𱬙	𱬚	𱬛	𱬜	𱬝	𱬞	𱬟
U+31B2x	𱬠	𱬡	𱬢	𱬣	𱬤	𱬥	𱬦	𱬧	𱬨	𱬩	𱬪	𱬫	𱬬	𱬭	𱬮	𱬯
U+31B3x	𱬰	𱬱	𱬲	𱬳	𱬴	𱬵	𱬶	𱬷	𱬸	𱬹	𱬺	𱬻	𱬼	𱬽	𱬾	𱬿
U+31B4x	𱭀	𱭁	𱭂	𱭃	𱭄	𱭅	𱭆	𱭇	𱭈	𱭉	𱭊	𱭋	𱭌	𱭍	𱭎	𱭏
U+31B5x	𱭐	𱭑	𱭒	𱭓	𱭔	𱭕	𱭖	𱭗	𱭘	𱭙	𱭚	𱭛	𱭜	𱭝	𱭞	𱭟
U+31B6x	𱭠	𱭡	𱭢	𱭣	𱭤	𱭥	𱭦	𱭧	𱭨	𱭩	𱭪	𱭫	𱭬	𱭭	𱭮	𱭯
U+31B7x	𱭰	𱭱	𱭲	𱭳	𱭴	𱭵	𱭶	𱭷	𱭸	𱭹	𱭺	𱭻	𱭼	𱭽	𱭾	𱭿
U+31B8x	𱮀	𱮁	𱮂	𱮃	𱮄	𱮅	𱮆	𱮇	𱮈	𱮉	𱮊	𱮋	𱮌	𱮍	𱮎	𱮏
U+31B9x	𱮐	𱮑	𱮒	𱮓	𱮔	𱮕	𱮖	𱮗	𱮘	𱮙	𱮚	𱮛	𱮜	𱮝	𱮞	𱮟
U+31BAx	𱮠	𱮡	𱮢	𱮣	𱮤	𱮥	𱮦	𱮧	𱮨	𱮩	𱮪	𱮫	𱮬	𱮭	𱮮	𱮯
U+31BBx	𱮰	𱮱	𱮲	𱮳	𱮴	𱮵	𱮶	𱮷	𱮸	𱮹	𱮺	𱮻	𱮼	𱮽	𱮾	𱮿
U+31BCx	𱯀	𱯁	𱯂	𱯃	𱯄	𱯅	𱯆	𱯇	𱯈	𱯉	𱯊	𱯋	𱯌	𱯍	𱯎	𱯏
U+31BDx	𱯐	𱯑	𱯒	𱯓	𱯔	𱯕	𱯖	𱯗	𱯘	𱯙	𱯚	𱯛	𱯜	𱯝	𱯞	𱯟
U+31BEx	𱯠	𱯡	𱯢	𱯣	𱯤	𱯥	𱯦	𱯧	𱯨	𱯩	𱯪	𱯫	𱯬	𱯭	𱯮	𱯯
U+31BFx	𱯰	𱯱	𱯲	𱯳	𱯴	𱯵	𱯶	𱯷	𱯸	𱯹	𱯺	𱯻	𱯼	𱯽	𱯾	𱯿
U+31C0x	𱰀	𱰁	𱰂	𱰃	𱰄	𱰅	𱰆	𱰇	𱰈	𱰉	𱰊	𱰋	𱰌	𱰍	𱰎	𱰏
U+31C1x	𱰐	𱰑	𱰒	𱰓	𱰔	𱰕	𱰖	𱰗	𱰘	𱰙	𱰚	𱰛	𱰜	𱰝	𱰞	𱰟
U+31C2x	𱰠	𱰡	𱰢	𱰣	𱰤	𱰥	𱰦	𱰧	𱰨	𱰩	𱰪	𱰫	𱰬	𱰭	𱰮	𱰯
U+31C3x	𱰰	𱰱	𱰲	𱰳	𱰴	𱰵	𱰶	𱰷	𱰸	𱰹	𱰺	𱰻	𱰼	𱰽	𱰾	𱰿
U+31C4x	𱱀	𱱁	𱱂	𱱃	𱱄	𱱅	𱱆	𱱇	𱱈	𱱉	𱱊	𱱋	𱱌	𱱍	𱱎	𱱏
U+31C5x	𱱐	𱱑	𱱒	𱱓	𱱔	𱱕	𱱖	𱱗	𱱘	𱱙	𱱚	𱱛	𱱜	𱱝	𱱞	𱱟
U+31C6x	𱱠	𱱡	𱱢	𱱣	𱱤	𱱥	𱱦	𱱧	𱱨	𱱩	𱱪	𱱫	𱱬	𱱭	𱱮	𱱯
U+31C7x	𱱰	𱱱	𱱲	𱱳	𱱴	𱱵	𱱶	𱱷	𱱸	𱱹	𱱺	𱱻	𱱼	𱱽	𱱾	𱱿
U+31C8x	𱲀	𱲁	𱲂	𱲃	𱲄	𱲅	𱲆	𱲇	𱲈	𱲉	𱲊	𱲋	𱲌	𱲍	𱲎	𱲏
U+31C9x	𱲐	𱲑	𱲒	𱲓	𱲔	𱲕	𱲖	𱲗	𱲘	𱲙	𱲚	𱲛	𱲜	𱲝	𱲞	𱲟
U+31CAx	𱲠	𱲡	𱲢	𱲣	𱲤	𱲥	𱲦	𱲧	𱲨	𱲩	𱲪	𱲫	𱲬	𱲭	𱲮	𱲯
U+31CBx	𱲰	𱲱	𱲲	𱲳	𱲴	𱲵	𱲶	𱲷	𱲸	𱲹	𱲺	𱲻	𱲼	𱲽	𱲾	𱲿
U+31CCx	𱳀	𱳁	𱳂	𱳃	𱳄	𱳅	𱳆	𱳇	𱳈	𱳉	𱳊	𱳋	𱳌	𱳍	𱳎	𱳏
U+31CDx	𱳐	𱳑	𱳒	𱳓	𱳔	𱳕	𱳖	𱳗	𱳘	𱳙	𱳚	𱳛	𱳜	𱳝	𱳞	𱳟
U+31CEx	𱳠	𱳡	𱳢	𱳣	𱳤	𱳥	𱳦	𱳧	𱳨	𱳩	𱳪	𱳫	𱳬	𱳭	𱳮	𱳯
U+31CFx	𱳰	𱳱	𱳲	𱳳	𱳴	𱳵	𱳶	𱳷	𱳸	𱳹	𱳺	𱳻	𱳼	𱳽	𱳾	𱳿
U+31D0x	𱴀	𱴁	𱴂	𱴃	𱴄	𱴅	𱴆	𱴇	𱴈	𱴉	𱴊	𱴋	𱴌	𱴍	𱴎	𱴏
U+31D1x	𱴐	𱴑	𱴒	𱴓	𱴔	𱴕	𱴖	𱴗	𱴘	𱴙	𱴚	𱴛	𱴜	𱴝	𱴞	𱴟
U+31D2x	𱴠	𱴡	𱴢	𱴣	𱴤	𱴥	𱴦	𱴧	𱴨	𱴩	𱴪	𱴫	𱴬	𱴭	𱴮	𱴯
U+31D3x	𱴰	𱴱	𱴲	𱴳	𱴴	𱴵	𱴶	𱴷	𱴸	𱴹	𱴺	𱴻	𱴼	𱴽	𱴾	𱴿
U+31D4x	𱵀	𱵁	𱵂	𱵃	𱵄	𱵅	𱵆	𱵇	𱵈	𱵉	𱵊	𱵋	𱵌	𱵍	𱵎	𱵏
U+31D5x	𱵐	𱵑	𱵒	𱵓	𱵔	𱵕	𱵖	𱵗	𱵘	𱵙	𱵚	𱵛	𱵜	𱵝	𱵞	𱵟
U+31D6x	𱵠	𱵡	𱵢	𱵣	𱵤	𱵥	𱵦	𱵧	𱵨	𱵩	𱵪	𱵫	𱵬	𱵭	𱵮	𱵯
U+31D7x	𱵰	𱵱	𱵲	𱵳	𱵴	𱵵	𱵶	𱵷	𱵸	𱵹	𱵺	𱵻	𱵼	𱵽	𱵾	𱵿
U+31D8x	𱶀	𱶁	𱶂	𱶃	𱶄	𱶅	𱶆	𱶇	𱶈	𱶉	𱶊	𱶋	𱶌	𱶍	𱶎	𱶏
U+31D9x	𱶐	𱶑	𱶒	𱶓	𱶔	𱶕	𱶖	𱶗	𱶘	𱶙	𱶚	𱶛	𱶜	𱶝	𱶞	𱶟
U+31DAx	𱶠	𱶡	𱶢	𱶣	𱶤	𱶥	𱶦	𱶧	𱶨	𱶩	𱶪	𱶫	𱶬	𱶭	𱶮	𱶯
U+31DBx	𱶰	𱶱	𱶲	𱶳	𱶴	𱶵	𱶶	𱶷	𱶸	𱶹	𱶺	𱶻	𱶼	𱶽	𱶾	𱶿
U+31DCx	𱷀	𱷁	𱷂	𱷃	𱷄	𱷅	𱷆	𱷇	𱷈	𱷉	𱷊	𱷋	𱷌	𱷍	𱷎	𱷏
U+31DDx	𱷐	𱷑	𱷒	𱷓	𱷔	𱷕	𱷖	𱷗	𱷘	𱷙	𱷚	𱷛	𱷜	𱷝	𱷞	𱷟
U+31DEx	𱷠	𱷡	𱷢	𱷣	𱷤	𱷥	𱷦	𱷧	𱷨	𱷩	𱷪	𱷫	𱷬	𱷭	𱷮	𱷯
U+31DFx	𱷰	𱷱	𱷲	𱷳	𱷴	𱷵	𱷶	𱷷	𱷸	𱷹	𱷺	𱷻	𱷼	𱷽	𱷾	𱷿
U+31E0x	𱸀	𱸁	𱸂	𱸃	𱸄	𱸅	𱸆	𱸇	𱸈	𱸉	𱸊	𱸋	𱸌	𱸍	𱸎	𱸏
U+31E1x	𱸐	𱸑	𱸒	𱸓	𱸔	𱸕	𱸖	𱸗	𱸘	𱸙	𱸚	𱸛	𱸜	𱸝	𱸞	𱸟
U+31E2x	𱸠	𱸡	𱸢	𱸣	𱸤	𱸥	𱸦	𱸧	𱸨	𱸩	𱸪	𱸫	𱸬	𱸭	𱸮	𱸯
U+31E3x	𱸰	𱸱	𱸲	𱸳	𱸴	𱸵	𱸶	𱸷	𱸸	𱸹	𱸺	𱸻	𱸼	𱸽	𱸾	𱸿
U+31E4x	𱹀	𱹁	𱹂	𱹃	𱹄	𱹅	𱹆	𱹇	𱹈	𱹉	𱹊	𱹋	𱹌	𱹍	𱹎	𱹏
U+31E5x	𱹐	𱹑	𱹒	𱹓	𱹔	𱹕	𱹖	𱹗	𱹘	𱹙	𱹚	𱹛	𱹜	𱹝	𱹞	𱹟
U+31E6x	𱹠	𱹡	𱹢	𱹣	𱹤	𱹥	𱹦	𱹧	𱹨	𱹩	𱹪	𱹫	𱹬	𱹭	𱹮	𱹯
U+31E7x	𱹰	𱹱	𱹲	𱹳	𱹴	𱹵	𱹶	𱹷	𱹸	𱹹	𱹺	𱹻	𱹼	𱹽	𱹾	𱹿
U+31E8x	𱺀	𱺁	𱺂	𱺃	𱺄	𱺅	𱺆	𱺇	𱺈	𱺉	𱺊	𱺋	𱺌	𱺍	𱺎	𱺏
U+31E9x	𱺐	𱺑	𱺒	𱺓	𱺔	𱺕	𱺖	𱺗	𱺘	𱺙	𱺚	𱺛	𱺜	𱺝	𱺞	𱺟
U+31EAx	𱺠	𱺡	𱺢	𱺣	𱺤	𱺥	𱺦	𱺧	𱺨	𱺩	𱺪	𱺫	𱺬	𱺭	𱺮	𱺯
U+31EBx	𱺰	𱺱	𱺲	𱺳	𱺴	𱺵	𱺶	𱺷	𱺸	𱺹	𱺺	𱺻	𱺼	𱺽	𱺾	𱺿
U+31ECx	𱻀	𱻁	𱻂	𱻃	𱻄	𱻅	𱻆	𱻇	𱻈	𱻉	𱻊	𱻋	𱻌	𱻍	𱻎	𱻏
U+31EDx	𱻐	𱻑	𱻒	𱻓	𱻔	𱻕	𱻖	𱻗	𱻘	𱻙	𱻚	𱻛	𱻜	𱻝	𱻞	𱻟
U+31EEx	𱻠	𱻡	𱻢	𱻣	𱻤	𱻥	𱻦	𱻧	𱻨	𱻩	𱻪	𱻫	𱻬	𱻭	𱻮	𱻯
U+31EFx	𱻰	𱻱	𱻲	𱻳	𱻴	𱻵	𱻶	𱻷	𱻸	𱻹	𱻺	𱻻	𱻼	𱻽	𱻾	𱻿
U+31F0x	𱼀	𱼁	𱼂	𱼃	𱼄	𱼅	𱼆	𱼇	𱼈	𱼉	𱼊	𱼋	𱼌	𱼍	𱼎	𱼏
U+31F1x	𱼐	𱼑	𱼒	𱼓	𱼔	𱼕	𱼖	𱼗	𱼘	𱼙	𱼚	𱼛	𱼜	𱼝	𱼞	𱼟
U+31F2x	𱼠	𱼡	𱼢	𱼣	𱼤	𱼥	𱼦	𱼧	𱼨	𱼩	𱼪	𱼫	𱼬	𱼭	𱼮	𱼯
U+31F3x	𱼰	𱼱	𱼲	𱼳	𱼴	𱼵	𱼶	𱼷	𱼸	𱼹	𱼺	𱼻	𱼼	𱼽	𱼾	𱼿
U+31F4x	𱽀	𱽁	𱽂	𱽃	𱽄	𱽅	𱽆	𱽇	𱽈	𱽉	𱽊	𱽋	𱽌	𱽍	𱽎	𱽏
U+31F5x	𱽐	𱽑	𱽒	𱽓	𱽔	𱽕	𱽖	𱽗	𱽘	𱽙	𱽚	𱽛	𱽜	𱽝	𱽞	𱽟
U+31F6x	𱽠	𱽡	𱽢	𱽣	𱽤	𱽥	𱽦	𱽧	𱽨	𱽩	𱽪	𱽫	𱽬	𱽭	𱽮	𱽯
U+31F7x	𱽰	𱽱	𱽲	𱽳	𱽴	𱽵	𱽶	𱽷	𱽸	𱽹	𱽺	𱽻	𱽼	𱽽	𱽾	𱽿
U+31F8x	𱾀	𱾁	𱾂	𱾃	𱾄	𱾅	𱾆	𱾇	𱾈	𱾉	𱾊	𱾋	𱾌	𱾍	𱾎	𱾏
U+31F9x	𱾐	𱾑	𱾒	𱾓	𱾔	𱾕	𱾖	𱾗	𱾘	𱾙	𱾚	𱾛	𱾜	𱾝	𱾞	𱾟
U+31FAx	𱾠	𱾡	𱾢	𱾣	𱾤	𱾥	𱾦	𱾧	𱾨	𱾩	𱾪	𱾫	𱾬	𱾭	𱾮	𱾯
U+31FBx	𱾰	𱾱	𱾲	𱾳	𱾴	𱾵	𱾶	𱾷	𱾸	𱾹	𱾺	𱾻	𱾼	𱾽	𱾾	𱾿
U+31FCx	𱿀	𱿁	𱿂	𱿃	𱿄	𱿅	𱿆	𱿇	𱿈	𱿉	𱿊	𱿋	𱿌	𱿍	𱿎	𱿏
U+31FDx	𱿐	𱿑	𱿒	𱿓	𱿔	𱿕	𱿖	𱿗	𱿘	𱿙	𱿚	𱿛	𱿜	𱿝	𱿞	𱿟
U+31FEx	𱿠	𱿡	𱿢	𱿣	𱿤	𱿥	𱿦	𱿧	𱿨	𱿩	𱿪	𱿫	𱿬	𱿭	𱿮	𱿯
U+31FFx	𱿰	𱿱	𱿲	𱿳	𱿴	𱿵	𱿶	𱿷	𱿸	𱿹	𱿺	𱿻	𱿼	𱿽	𱿾	𱿿
U+3200x	𲀀	𲀁	𲀂	𲀃	𲀄	𲀅	𲀆	𲀇	𲀈	𲀉	𲀊	𲀋	𲀌	𲀍	𲀎	𲀏
U+3201x	𲀐	𲀑	𲀒	𲀓	𲀔	𲀕	𲀖	𲀗	𲀘	𲀙	𲀚	𲀛	𲀜	𲀝	𲀞	𲀟
U+3202x	𲀠	𲀡	𲀢	𲀣	𲀤	𲀥	𲀦	𲀧	𲀨	𲀩	𲀪	𲀫	𲀬	𲀭	𲀮	𲀯
U+3203x	𲀰	𲀱	𲀲	𲀳	𲀴	𲀵	𲀶	𲀷	𲀸	𲀹	𲀺	𲀻	𲀼	𲀽	𲀾	𲀿
U+3204x	𲁀	𲁁	𲁂	𲁃	𲁄	𲁅	𲁆	𲁇	𲁈	𲁉	𲁊	𲁋	𲁌	𲁍	𲁎	𲁏
U+3205x	𲁐	𲁑	𲁒	𲁓	𲁔	𲁕	𲁖	𲁗	𲁘	𲁙	𲁚	𲁛	𲁜	𲁝	𲁞	𲁟
U+3206x	𲁠	𲁡	𲁢	𲁣	𲁤	𲁥	𲁦	𲁧	𲁨	𲁩	𲁪	𲁫	𲁬	𲁭	𲁮	𲁯
U+3207x	𲁰	𲁱	𲁲	𲁳	𲁴	𲁵	𲁶	𲁷	𲁸	𲁹	𲁺	𲁻	𲁼	𲁽	𲁾	𲁿
U+3208x	𲂀	𲂁	𲂂	𲂃	𲂄	𲂅	𲂆	𲂇	𲂈	𲂉	𲂊	𲂋	𲂌	𲂍	𲂎	𲂏
U+3209x	𲂐	𲂑	𲂒	𲂓	𲂔	𲂕	𲂖	𲂗	𲂘	𲂙	𲂚	𲂛	𲂜	𲂝	𲂞	𲂟
U+320Ax	𲂠	𲂡	𲂢	𲂣	𲂤	𲂥	𲂦	𲂧	𲂨	𲂩	𲂪	𲂫	𲂬	𲂭	𲂮	𲂯
U+320Bx	𲂰	𲂱	𲂲	𲂳	𲂴	𲂵	𲂶	𲂷	𲂸	𲂹	𲂺	𲂻	𲂼	𲂽	𲂾	𲂿
U+320Cx	𲃀	𲃁	𲃂	𲃃	𲃄	𲃅	𲃆	𲃇	𲃈	𲃉	𲃊	𲃋	𲃌	𲃍	𲃎	𲃏
U+320Dx	𲃐	𲃑	𲃒	𲃓	𲃔	𲃕	𲃖	𲃗	𲃘	𲃙	𲃚	𲃛	𲃜	𲃝	𲃞	𲃟
U+320Ex	𲃠	𲃡	𲃢	𲃣	𲃤	𲃥	𲃦	𲃧	𲃨	𲃩	𲃪	𲃫	𲃬	𲃭	𲃮	𲃯
U+320Fx	𲃰	𲃱	𲃲	𲃳	𲃴	𲃵	𲃶	𲃷	𲃸	𲃹	𲃺	𲃻	𲃼	𲃽	𲃾	𲃿
U+3210x	𲄀	𲄁	𲄂	𲄃	𲄄	𲄅	𲄆	𲄇	𲄈	𲄉	𲄊	𲄋	𲄌	𲄍	𲄎	𲄏
U+3211x	𲄐	𲄑	𲄒	𲄓	𲄔	𲄕	𲄖	𲄗	𲄘	𲄙	𲄚	𲄛	𲄜	𲄝	𲄞	𲄟
U+3212x	𲄠	𲄡	𲄢	𲄣	𲄤	𲄥	𲄦	𲄧	𲄨	𲄩	𲄪	𲄫	𲄬	𲄭	𲄮	𲄯
U+3213x	𲄰	𲄱	𲄲	𲄳	𲄴	𲄵	𲄶	𲄷	𲄸	𲄹	𲄺	𲄻	𲄼	𲄽	𲄾	𲄿
U+3214x	𲅀	𲅁	𲅂	𲅃	𲅄	𲅅	𲅆	𲅇	𲅈	𲅉	𲅊	𲅋	𲅌	𲅍	𲅎	𲅏
U+3215x	𲅐	𲅑	𲅒	𲅓	𲅔	𲅕	𲅖	𲅗	𲅘	𲅙	𲅚	𲅛	𲅜	𲅝	𲅞	𲅟
U+3216x	𲅠	𲅡	𲅢	𲅣	𲅤	𲅥	𲅦	𲅧	𲅨	𲅩	𲅪	𲅫	𲅬	𲅭	𲅮	𲅯
U+3217x	𲅰	𲅱	𲅲	𲅳	𲅴	𲅵	𲅶	𲅷	𲅸	𲅹	𲅺	𲅻	𲅼	𲅽	𲅾	𲅿
U+3218x	𲆀	𲆁	𲆂	𲆃	𲆄	𲆅	𲆆	𲆇	𲆈	𲆉	𲆊	𲆋	𲆌	𲆍	𲆎	𲆏
U+3219x	𲆐	𲆑	𲆒	𲆓	𲆔	𲆕	𲆖	𲆗	𲆘	𲆙	𲆚	𲆛	𲆜	𲆝	𲆞	𲆟
U+321Ax	𲆠	𲆡	𲆢	𲆣	𲆤	𲆥	𲆦	𲆧	𲆨	𲆩	𲆪	𲆫	𲆬	𲆭	𲆮	𲆯
U+321Bx	𲆰	𲆱	𲆲	𲆳	𲆴	𲆵	𲆶	𲆷	𲆸	𲆹	𲆺	𲆻	𲆼	𲆽	𲆾	𲆿
U+321Cx	𲇀	𲇁	𲇂	𲇃	𲇄	𲇅	𲇆	𲇇	𲇈	𲇉	𲇊	𲇋	𲇌	𲇍	𲇎	𲇏
U+321Dx	𲇐	𲇑	𲇒	𲇓	𲇔	𲇕	𲇖	𲇗	𲇘	𲇙	𲇚	𲇛	𲇜	𲇝	𲇞	𲇟
U+321Ex	𲇠	𲇡	𲇢	𲇣	𲇤	𲇥	𲇦	𲇧	𲇨	𲇩	𲇪	𲇫	𲇬	𲇭	𲇮	𲇯
U+321Fx	𲇰	𲇱	𲇲	𲇳	𲇴	𲇵	𲇶	𲇷	𲇸	𲇹	𲇺	𲇻	𲇼	𲇽	𲇾	𲇿
U+3220x	𲈀	𲈁	𲈂	𲈃	𲈄	𲈅	𲈆	𲈇	𲈈	𲈉	𲈊	𲈋	𲈌	𲈍	𲈎	𲈏
U+3221x	𲈐	𲈑	𲈒	𲈓	𲈔	𲈕	𲈖	𲈗	𲈘	𲈙	𲈚	𲈛	𲈜	𲈝	𲈞	𲈟
U+3222x	𲈠	𲈡	𲈢	𲈣	𲈤	𲈥	𲈦	𲈧	𲈨	𲈩	𲈪	𲈫	𲈬	𲈭	𲈮	𲈯
U+3223x	𲈰	𲈱	𲈲	𲈳	𲈴	𲈵	𲈶	𲈷	𲈸	𲈹	𲈺	𲈻	𲈼	𲈽	𲈾	𲈿
U+3224x	𲉀	𲉁	𲉂	𲉃	𲉄	𲉅	𲉆	𲉇	𲉈	𲉉	𲉊	𲉋	𲉌	𲉍	𲉎	𲉏
U+3225x	𲉐	𲉑	𲉒	𲉓	𲉔	𲉕	𲉖	𲉗	𲉘	𲉙	𲉚	𲉛	𲉜	𲉝	𲉞	𲉟
U+3226x	𲉠	𲉡	𲉢	𲉣	𲉤	𲉥	𲉦	𲉧	𲉨	𲉩	𲉪	𲉫	𲉬	𲉭	𲉮	𲉯
U+3227x	𲉰	𲉱	𲉲	𲉳	𲉴	𲉵	𲉶	𲉷	𲉸	𲉹	𲉺	𲉻	𲉼	𲉽	𲉾	𲉿
U+3228x	𲊀	𲊁	𲊂	𲊃	𲊄	𲊅	𲊆	𲊇	𲊈	𲊉	𲊊	𲊋	𲊌	𲊍	𲊎	𲊏
U+3229x	𲊐	𲊑	𲊒	𲊓	𲊔	𲊕	𲊖	𲊗	𲊘	𲊙	𲊚	𲊛	𲊜	𲊝	𲊞	𲊟
U+322Ax	𲊠	𲊡	𲊢	𲊣	𲊤	𲊥	𲊦	𲊧	𲊨	𲊩	𲊪	𲊫	𲊬	𲊭	𲊮	𲊯
U+322Bx	𲊰	𲊱	𲊲	𲊳	𲊴	𲊵	𲊶	𲊷	𲊸	𲊹	𲊺	𲊻	𲊼	𲊽	𲊾	𲊿
U+322Cx	𲋀	𲋁	𲋂	𲋃	𲋄	𲋅	𲋆	𲋇	𲋈	𲋉	𲋊	𲋋	𲋌	𲋍	𲋎	𲋏
U+322Dx	𲋐	𲋑	𲋒	𲋓	𲋔	𲋕	𲋖	𲋗	𲋘	𲋙	𲋚	𲋛	𲋜	𲋝	𲋞	𲋟
U+322Ex	𲋠	𲋡	𲋢	𲋣	𲋤	𲋥	𲋦	𲋧	𲋨	𲋩	𲋪	𲋫	𲋬	𲋭	𲋮	𲋯
U+322Fx	𲋰	𲋱	𲋲	𲋳	𲋴	𲋵	𲋶	𲋷	𲋸	𲋹	𲋺	𲋻	𲋼	𲋽	𲋾	𲋿
U+3230x	𲌀	𲌁	𲌂	𲌃	𲌄	𲌅	𲌆	𲌇	𲌈	𲌉	𲌊	𲌋	𲌌	𲌍	𲌎	𲌏
U+3231x	𲌐	𲌑	𲌒	𲌓	𲌔	𲌕	𲌖	𲌗	𲌘	𲌙	𲌚	𲌛	𲌜	𲌝	𲌞	𲌟
U+3232x	𲌠	𲌡	𲌢	𲌣	𲌤	𲌥	𲌦	𲌧	𲌨	𲌩	𲌪	𲌫	𲌬	𲌭	𲌮	𲌯
U+3233x	𲌰	𲌱	𲌲	𲌳	𲌴	𲌵	𲌶	𲌷	𲌸	𲌹	𲌺	𲌻	𲌼	𲌽	𲌾	𲌿
U+3234x	𲍀	𲍁	𲍂	𲍃	𲍄	𲍅	𲍆	𲍇	𲍈	𲍉	𲍊	𲍋	𲍌	𲍍	𲍎	𲍏
U+3235x	𲍐	𲍑	𲍒	𲍓	𲍔	𲍕	𲍖	𲍗	𲍘	𲍙	𲍚	𲍛	𲍜	𲍝	𲍞	𲍟
U+3236x	𲍠	𲍡	𲍢	𲍣	𲍤	𲍥	𲍦	𲍧	𲍨	𲍩	𲍪	𲍫	𲍬	𲍭	𲍮	𲍯
U+3237x	𲍰	𲍱	𲍲	𲍳	𲍴	𲍵	𲍶	𲍷	𲍸	𲍹	𲍺	𲍻	𲍼	𲍽	𲍾	𲍿
U+3238x	𲎀	𲎁	𲎂	𲎃	𲎄	𲎅	𲎆	𲎇	𲎈	𲎉	𲎊	𲎋	𲎌	𲎍	𲎎	𲎏
U+3239x	𲎐	𲎑	𲎒	𲎓	𲎔	𲎕	𲎖	𲎗	𲎘	𲎙	𲎚	𲎛	𲎜	𲎝	𲎞	𲎟
U+323Ax	𲎠	𲎡	𲎢	𲎣	𲎤	𲎥	𲎦	𲎧	𲎨	𲎩	𲎪	𲎫	𲎬	𲎭	𲎮	𲎯
Notes 1.As of Unicode version 17.0

== History ==
The following Unicode-related documents record the purpose and process of defining specific characters in the CJK Unified Ideographs Extension H block:

Version	Final code points (Note: Proposed code points and characters names may differ from final code points and names)	Count	L2 ID	WG2 ID	IRG ID	Document
15.0	U+31350..323AF	4,192	L2/06-364			Jenkins, John (2006-11-01), Proposed UTC C2 Submission [Affects U+3184B]
15.0	U+31350..323AF	4,192	L2/06-324R2			Moore, Lisa (2006-11-29), "Action Item 109-A39", UTC #109 Minutes, "Submit the characters in L2/06-364 (including Lee's) to the IRG."
15.0	U+31350..323AF	4,192	L2/12-333			West, Andrew (2012-10-19), Request to UTC to Propose 226 Characters for Inclusion in CJK Extension F [Affects U+31C2D, 31E7C]
15.0	U+31350..323AF	4,192	L2/15-177R			Fan, Ming (2015-08-30), Proposal to add 109 ideographs to UAX #45 [Affects U+31AA3, 321E0, 32344]
15.0	U+31350..323AF	4,192	L2/15-223			Lunde, Ken; et al. (2015-11-02), UTC Character Submission for 2015
15.0	U+31350..323AF	4,192	L2/15-254			Moore, Lisa (2015-11-16), "Consensus 145-C4", UTC #145 Minutes, "Accept the proposal to submit 313 characters documented in L2/15-223 and send to the IRG."
15.0	U+31350..323AF	4,192	L2/16-066			Yuan, Xu (2016-03-14), Proposal on creating 2 Chinese Ancient Characters [Affects U+32100]
15.0	U+31350..323AF	4,192	L2/16-239R			Fan, Ming (2016-08-29), Proposal of Urgently Needed Characters [Affects U+313BC, 31DC8]
15.0	U+31350..323AF	4,192	L2/16-269			Jenkins, John H. (2016-09-27), Report on 〇 and Two Ideographs [Affects U+317AB]
15.0	U+31350..323AF	4,192	L2/16-325			Moore, Lisa (2016-11-18), "Action Item 149-A74", UTC #149 Minutes, "Add character Hanyu Dazidian 42326.100 to proposed update of UAX #45, and include in our submission for Extension H. See L2/16-269."
15.0	U+31350..323AF	4,192	L2/16-385R			Chan, Eiso (2017-01-16), Proposal to add an ideograph to UAX #45 [Affects U+32003]
15.0	U+31350..323AF	4,192	L2/17-062 (pdf, zip)			Wang, Xieyang (2017-03-01), Proposal to add 100 place names used ideographs to UAX #45 [Affects U+31379, 313CB, 313E4, 31408, 3145E, 314F0, 31580, 31587, 3158E-3158F, 31596, 31598, 3159E, 315A2, 315A7, 315AB-315AD, 315B2-315B3, 315B4, 315BE, 315C4-315C5, 315CD, 315DA, 315E5, 315E8, 315EE-315F0, 31604, 31606, 31609, 3162E, 31632, 316B1, 316B2, 316C2, 316C6-316C7, 316CF-316D0, 316E4, 316E6, 316E8, 316EE, 3170E, 31712, 3187F, 31884, 318D5, 318E4, 31970, 31977, 31994-31995, 31A49, 31A4A, 31BDE, 31C24-31C25, 31C27, 31C2E, 31C33, 31C50, 31CED, 31CFE, 31D07, 31D10, 31D29, 31D2A, 31E11, 31E16, 31E1B, 31E25, 31E27-31E28, 31E99, 31EB2-31EB3, 31ECB, 31F6A, 3200A, 3201D, 320BA, 32117, 3214C, 32152, 32199, 3223C, 3224D, 322B9, 32353, 3237C]
15.0	U+31350..323AF	4,192	L2/17-079			Chan, Eiso (2017-03-28), Proposal to add two ideographs for Gongche Notation to UAX #45 [Affects U+3176B-3176C]
15.0	U+31350..323AF	4,192	L2/17-083			Wang, Xieyang (2017-04-03), Proposal to add one ideograph used in Teochew Dialects to UAX #45 [Affects U+317DB]
15.0	U+31350..323AF	4,192	L2/17-099			Wang, Xieyang (2017-04-17), Proposal to add an ideograph for Haifeng County to UAX #45 as a urgently needed character [Affects U+31E4D]
15.0	U+31350..323AF	4,192	L2/17-111			Li, Eddie (2017-04-26), Proposal to add an ideograph for Chemistry to UAX #45 [Affects U+31F66]
15.0	U+31350..323AF	4,192	L2/17-103			Moore, Lisa (2017-05-18), "B.3.2 Comments on IRG P&P Version 9", UTC #151 Minutes
15.0	U+31350..323AF	4,192			N2210R	Chan, Eiso; Chau, Gienwen; Wang, Xieyang (2017-06-08), Comments on U+5CC0 & U+2F936
15.0	U+31350..323AF	4,192			N2227	Working Set 2017 Version 0.0, 2017-10-12
15.0	U+31350..323AF	4,192	L2/17-204			Fan, Ming (2017-07-23), Proposal to add 78 ideographs to UAX #45 [Affects U+31350, 313CA, 313D5, 313E2, 31426, 31583, 31602, 3175F, 31761, 317CA, 317D3, 317FA, 31816, 31839, 31903, 3195C, 31A1A, 31AA6, 31ACB, 31B16, 31B7F, 31CBD, 31CD2, 31D3C, 31D54, 31DDC, 31E2D, 31F7A, 31F9F, 31FA0, 31FF4, 32043, 32048, 320CD, 320FD, 320FF, 32109, 32111, 32149, 321AB, 322B5, 322FC, 32302-32303, 3230F, 32322, 3238E, 323A0]
15.0	U+31350..323AF	4,192	L2/17-286			Lunde, Ken (2017-08-02), Preliminary IRG Working Set 2017 Submission
15.0	U+31350..323AF	4,192	L2/17-222			Moore, Lisa (2017-08-11), "Consensus 152-C25", UTC #152 Minutes, "Prepare a submission to IRG based on documents L2/17-286 and L2/17-204 with possible refinements."
15.0	U+31350..323AF	4,192			N2444	West, Andrew (2017-08-11), UK Request to Rename UK Source References for IRG Working Set 2015
15.0	U+31350..323AF	4,192	L2/17-308		N2232	Lunde, Ken (2017-09-15), IRG Working Set 2017 Submission from UK
15.0	U+31350..323AF	4,192			N2232R	UK Submission for IRG Working Set 2017, 2019-10-13
15.0	U+31350..323AF	4,192			N2229R	Proposal for IRG Working Set 2017 from ROK, 2017-09-15
15.0	U+31350..323AF	4,192			N2230R	Proposal for IRG Working Set 2017 from SAT, 2018-03-19
15.0	U+31350..323AF	4,192			N2231R	Proposal for IRG Working Set 2017 from TCA, 2018-03-16
15.0	U+31350..323AF	4,192			N2241R	Proposal for IRG Working Set 2017 from Vietnam, 2017-09-15
15.0	U+31350..323AF	4,192			N2228R	Proposal for IRG Working Set 2017 from China, 2018-03-15
15.0	U+31350..323AF	4,192			N2270	IRG Working Set 2017 Version 1.1, 2018-05-20
15.0	U+31350..323AF	4,192			N2292	Editorial Report on WS2017, 2018-05-24
15.0	U+31350..323AF	4,192	L2/18-269		N2309R	IRG Working Set 2017 Version 2.0, 2018-10-20
15.0	U+31350..323AF	4,192	L2/18-270			Lunde, Ken (2018-08-23), IRG N2309 IRG Working Set 2017 Version 2.0 UTC Comments
15.0	U+31350..323AF	4,192	L2/18-315			Lunde, Ken (2018-10-14), UTC Response to IRG Working Set 2017 Version 2.0 (IRG N2309) Consolidated Comments [Affects U+317E1]
15.0	U+31350..323AF	4,192			N2328	Editorial Report on IRG WS 2017, 2018-10-25
15.0	U+31350..323AF	4,192			N2347	WS 2017 V3.0, 2019-05-11
15.0	U+31350..323AF	4,192			N2364	Editorial Report on IRG Working Set 2017 v3.0, 2019-05-17
15.0	U+31350..323AF	4,192			N2385	IRG Working Set 2017 Version 4.0, 2019-06-14
15.0	U+31350..323AF	4,192			N2406	Editorial Report on IRG Working Set 2017 v4.0, 2019-10-24
15.0	U+31350..323AF	4,192			N2423	IRG Working Set 2017 Version 5.0, 2020-01-09
15.0	U+31350..323AF	4,192			N2429R	V0 Source Corrections, 2020-03-11
15.0	U+31350..323AF	4,192			N2432	Chan, Eiso; Collins, Lee; Nhàn, Ngô Thanh (2020-06-17), Request to change V-source codes for some WS2017 characters
15.0	U+31350..323AF	4,192			N2435	WS2017v5.1 Working Set, 2020-08-04
15.0	U+31350..323AF	4,192	L2/21-023			IRG Working Set 2017 Version 5.2, 2021-01-07
15.0	U+31350..323AF	4,192	L2/21-053	N5156	N2469	Suignard, Michel (2021-03-04), Additional repertoire for a future version of Unicode (post Unicode 14.0)
15.0	U+31350..323AF	4,192	L2/21-062R		N2463R	IRG #56 Editorial Report, 2021-04-07
15.0	U+31350..323AF	4,192			N2475	IRG Working Set 2017 Version 6.0 (Draft Code Chart of Ext. H), 2021-07-12
15.0	U+31350..323AF	4,192			N2480	IRG Working Set 2017 Version 6.1, 2021-08-18
15.0	U+31350..323AF	4,192	L2/21-158	N5165	N2500	"Recommendation IRG M57.2", IRG Meeting #57 Recommendations and Action Items, 2021-09-17
15.0	U+31350..323AF	4,192			N2506	IRG#57 Editorial Report, 2021-09-17
15.0	U+31350..323AF	4,192			N2513	IRG WS 2017 V7.0, 2021-09-22
15.0	U+31350..323AF	4,192	L2/22-022			Lunde, Ken (2022-01-26), CJK & Unihan Group Recommendations for UTC #170 Meeting
15.0	U+31350..323AF	4,192	L2/22-016			Constable, Peter (2022-04-21), "E.1 05 and E.1 15", UTC #170 Minutes
15.0	U+31350..323AF	4,192			N2544	IRG WS 2017 V7.1 with code range change to U+31350 - U+323AF, 2022-02-25
15.0	U+31350..323AF	4,192			N2555	Errata of IRG WS2017 v7.0 (CJK Unified Ideographs Extension H) [Affects U+31F4C, 31F68], 2022-05-08
15.0	U+31350..323AF	4,192		N5194		"TE.2. Clause 34. Code charts ... – CJK Unified Ideographs Ext H – 31F4C [Affects U+31F4C, 31F68]", Disposition of comments on CDAM1.2 to ISO/IEC 10646 6th edition, 2022-06-23
15.0	U+31350..323AF	4,192	L2/22-127			Lunde, Ken (2022-07-21), "PRI #442 Feedback [Affects U+31F4C, 31F68]", CJK & Unihan Group Recommendations for UTC #172 Meeting
15.0	U+31350..323AF	4,192	L2/22-121			Constable, Peter (2022-08-01), Draft Minutes of UTC Meeting 172 [Affects U+31F4C, 31F68]
15.0	U+31350..323AF	4,192	L2/23-085		N2577	Chan, Henry; Woo, Chi Chung (2022-10-02), Request to Update Glyph for U+31D5A
15.0	U+31350..323AF	4,192	L2/22-258			Shin, SangHyun; Kim, Kyongsok (2022-10-14), Changing glyphs and IDSs of 97 KR Hanja chars containing '叱 (U+53F1)' [Affects U+314B7, 31542, and 31569]
15.0	U+31350..323AF	4,192	L2/22-256		N2580R	T-Source Glyph Correction and Horizontal Extension [Affects U+31C7F], 2022-10-18
15.0	U+31350..323AF	4,192	L2/22-247			Lunde, Ken (2022-11-01), "24) L2/22-256 and 25) L2/22-258", CJK & Unihan Group Recommendations for UTC #173 Meeting
15.0	U+31350..323AF	4,192	L2/22-241			Constable, Peter (2022-11-09), "E.1 24) L2/22-256 and E.1 25) L2/22-258", Approved Minutes of UTC Meeting 173
15.0	U+31350..323AF	4,192	L2/23-082			Lunde, Ken (2023-04-22), "13 [Affects U+3136B]", CJK & Unihan Group Recommendations for UTC #175 Meeting
15.0	U+31350..323AF	4,192	L2/23-076			Constable, Peter (2023-05-01), "E.1 Section 13 [Affects U+3136B] and E.1 Section 26 [Affects U+31D5A]", UTC #175 Minutes
15.0	U+31350..323AF	4,192	L2/23-244		N2616	Wang, Xieyang (2023-05-04), Suggestions to correct representative glyphs of 4 CJKUIs [Affects U+32268]
15.0	U+31350..323AF	4,192	L2/23-237R			Lunde, Ken (2023-11-02), "21 [Affects U+32268]", CJK & Unihan Group Recommendations for UTC #177 Meeting
15.0	U+31350..323AF	4,192	L2/23-231			Constable, Peter (2023-12-08), "Section 21 [Affects U+32268]", UTC #177 Minutes
15.0	U+31350..323AF	4,192	L2/24-012			Lunde, Ken (2024-01-11), "06 [Affects U+3150D] and 07 [Affects U+317EA]", CJK & Unihan Group Recommendations for UTC #178 Meeting
15.0	U+31350..323AF	4,192	L2/24-006			Constable, Peter (2024-01-31), "Section 06 [Affects U+3150D] and Section 07 [Affects U+317EA]", UTC #178 Minutes
