= CJK Unified Ideographs Extension J =

- Range: U+323B0..U+3347F (4,304 code points)
- Plane: TIP
- Scripts: Han
- Assigned: 4,298 code points
- Unused: 6 reserved code points

Unicode version history
- 17.0 (2025): 4,298 (+4,298)

Unicode documentation
- Code chart ∣ Web page

CJK Unified Ideographs Extension J is a Unicode block containing rare and historic CJK Unified Ideographs for Chinese, Japanese, Korean, and Vietnamese which were submitted to the Ideographic Research Group in 2021.

== Block ==
CJK Unified Ideographs Extension J^{[1]}^{[2]} Official Unicode Consortium code chart (PDF)
	0	1	2	3	4	5	6	7	8	9	A	B	C	D	E	F
U+323Bx	𲎰	𲎱	𲎲	𲎳	𲎴	𲎵	𲎶	𲎷	𲎸	𲎹	𲎺	𲎻	𲎼	𲎽	𲎾	𲎿
U+323Cx	𲏀	𲏁	𲏂	𲏃	𲏄	𲏅	𲏆	𲏇	𲏈	𲏉	𲏊	𲏋	𲏌	𲏍	𲏎	𲏏
U+323Dx	𲏐	𲏑	𲏒	𲏓	𲏔	𲏕	𲏖	𲏗	𲏘	𲏙	𲏚	𲏛	𲏜	𲏝	𲏞	𲏟
U+323Ex	𲏠	𲏡	𲏢	𲏣	𲏤	𲏥	𲏦	𲏧	𲏨	𲏩	𲏪	𲏫	𲏬	𲏭	𲏮	𲏯
U+323Fx	𲏰	𲏱	𲏲	𲏳	𲏴	𲏵	𲏶	𲏷	𲏸	𲏹	𲏺	𲏻	𲏼	𲏽	𲏾	𲏿
U+3240x	𲐀	𲐁	𲐂	𲐃	𲐄	𲐅	𲐆	𲐇	𲐈	𲐉	𲐊	𲐋	𲐌	𲐍	𲐎	𲐏
U+3241x	𲐐	𲐑	𲐒	𲐓	𲐔	𲐕	𲐖	𲐗	𲐘	𲐙	𲐚	𲐛	𲐜	𲐝	𲐞	𲐟
U+3242x	𲐠	𲐡	𲐢	𲐣	𲐤	𲐥	𲐦	𲐧	𲐨	𲐩	𲐪	𲐫	𲐬	𲐭	𲐮	𲐯
U+3243x	𲐰	𲐱	𲐲	𲐳	𲐴	𲐵	𲐶	𲐷	𲐸	𲐹	𲐺	𲐻	𲐼	𲐽	𲐾	𲐿
U+3244x	𲑀	𲑁	𲑂	𲑃	𲑄	𲑅	𲑆	𲑇	𲑈	𲑉	𲑊	𲑋	𲑌	𲑍	𲑎	𲑏
U+3245x	𲑐	𲑑	𲑒	𲑓	𲑔	𲑕	𲑖	𲑗	𲑘	𲑙	𲑚	𲑛	𲑜	𲑝	𲑞	𲑟
U+3246x	𲑠	𲑡	𲑢	𲑣	𲑤	𲑥	𲑦	𲑧	𲑨	𲑩	𲑪	𲑫	𲑬	𲑭	𲑮	𲑯
U+3247x	𲑰	𲑱	𲑲	𲑳	𲑴	𲑵	𲑶	𲑷	𲑸	𲑹	𲑺	𲑻	𲑼	𲑽	𲑾	𲑿
U+3248x	𲒀	𲒁	𲒂	𲒃	𲒄	𲒅	𲒆	𲒇	𲒈	𲒉	𲒊	𲒋	𲒌	𲒍	𲒎	𲒏
U+3249x	𲒐	𲒑	𲒒	𲒓	𲒔	𲒕	𲒖	𲒗	𲒘	𲒙	𲒚	𲒛	𲒜	𲒝	𲒞	𲒟
U+324Ax	𲒠	𲒡	𲒢	𲒣	𲒤	𲒥	𲒦	𲒧	𲒨	𲒩	𲒪	𲒫	𲒬	𲒭	𲒮	𲒯
U+324Bx	𲒰	𲒱	𲒲	𲒳	𲒴	𲒵	𲒶	𲒷	𲒸	𲒹	𲒺	𲒻	𲒼	𲒽	𲒾	𲒿
U+324Cx	𲓀	𲓁	𲓂	𲓃	𲓄	𲓅	𲓆	𲓇	𲓈	𲓉	𲓊	𲓋	𲓌	𲓍	𲓎	𲓏
U+324Dx	𲓐	𲓑	𲓒	𲓓	𲓔	𲓕	𲓖	𲓗	𲓘	𲓙	𲓚	𲓛	𲓜	𲓝	𲓞	𲓟
U+324Ex	𲓠	𲓡	𲓢	𲓣	𲓤	𲓥	𲓦	𲓧	𲓨	𲓩	𲓪	𲓫	𲓬	𲓭	𲓮	𲓯
U+324Fx	𲓰	𲓱	𲓲	𲓳	𲓴	𲓵	𲓶	𲓷	𲓸	𲓹	𲓺	𲓻	𲓼	𲓽	𲓾	𲓿
U+3250x	𲔀	𲔁	𲔂	𲔃	𲔄	𲔅	𲔆	𲔇	𲔈	𲔉	𲔊	𲔋	𲔌	𲔍	𲔎	𲔏
U+3251x	𲔐	𲔑	𲔒	𲔓	𲔔	𲔕	𲔖	𲔗	𲔘	𲔙	𲔚	𲔛	𲔜	𲔝	𲔞	𲔟
U+3252x	𲔠	𲔡	𲔢	𲔣	𲔤	𲔥	𲔦	𲔧	𲔨	𲔩	𲔪	𲔫	𲔬	𲔭	𲔮	𲔯
U+3253x	𲔰	𲔱	𲔲	𲔳	𲔴	𲔵	𲔶	𲔷	𲔸	𲔹	𲔺	𲔻	𲔼	𲔽	𲔾	𲔿
U+3254x	𲕀	𲕁	𲕂	𲕃	𲕄	𲕅	𲕆	𲕇	𲕈	𲕉	𲕊	𲕋	𲕌	𲕍	𲕎	𲕏
U+3255x	𲕐	𲕑	𲕒	𲕓	𲕔	𲕕	𲕖	𲕗	𲕘	𲕙	𲕚	𲕛	𲕜	𲕝	𲕞	𲕟
U+3256x	𲕠	𲕡	𲕢	𲕣	𲕤	𲕥	𲕦	𲕧	𲕨	𲕩	𲕪	𲕫	𲕬	𲕭	𲕮	𲕯
U+3257x	𲕰	𲕱	𲕲	𲕳	𲕴	𲕵	𲕶	𲕷	𲕸	𲕹	𲕺	𲕻	𲕼	𲕽	𲕾	𲕿
U+3258x	𲖀	𲖁	𲖂	𲖃	𲖄	𲖅	𲖆	𲖇	𲖈	𲖉	𲖊	𲖋	𲖌	𲖍	𲖎	𲖏
U+3259x	𲖐	𲖑	𲖒	𲖓	𲖔	𲖕	𲖖	𲖗	𲖘	𲖙	𲖚	𲖛	𲖜	𲖝	𲖞	𲖟
U+325Ax	𲖠	𲖡	𲖢	𲖣	𲖤	𲖥	𲖦	𲖧	𲖨	𲖩	𲖪	𲖫	𲖬	𲖭	𲖮	𲖯
U+325Bx	𲖰	𲖱	𲖲	𲖳	𲖴	𲖵	𲖶	𲖷	𲖸	𲖹	𲖺	𲖻	𲖼	𲖽	𲖾	𲖿
U+325Cx	𲗀	𲗁	𲗂	𲗃	𲗄	𲗅	𲗆	𲗇	𲗈	𲗉	𲗊	𲗋	𲗌	𲗍	𲗎	𲗏
U+325Dx	𲗐	𲗑	𲗒	𲗓	𲗔	𲗕	𲗖	𲗗	𲗘	𲗙	𲗚	𲗛	𲗜	𲗝	𲗞	𲗟
U+325Ex	𲗠	𲗡	𲗢	𲗣	𲗤	𲗥	𲗦	𲗧	𲗨	𲗩	𲗪	𲗫	𲗬	𲗭	𲗮	𲗯
U+325Fx	𲗰	𲗱	𲗲	𲗳	𲗴	𲗵	𲗶	𲗷	𲗸	𲗹	𲗺	𲗻	𲗼	𲗽	𲗾	𲗿
U+3260x	𲘀	𲘁	𲘂	𲘃	𲘄	𲘅	𲘆	𲘇	𲘈	𲘉	𲘊	𲘋	𲘌	𲘍	𲘎	𲘏
U+3261x	𲘐	𲘑	𲘒	𲘓	𲘔	𲘕	𲘖	𲘗	𲘘	𲘙	𲘚	𲘛	𲘜	𲘝	𲘞	𲘟
U+3262x	𲘠	𲘡	𲘢	𲘣	𲘤	𲘥	𲘦	𲘧	𲘨	𲘩	𲘪	𲘫	𲘬	𲘭	𲘮	𲘯
U+3263x	𲘰	𲘱	𲘲	𲘳	𲘴	𲘵	𲘶	𲘷	𲘸	𲘹	𲘺	𲘻	𲘼	𲘽	𲘾	𲘿
U+3264x	𲙀	𲙁	𲙂	𲙃	𲙄	𲙅	𲙆	𲙇	𲙈	𲙉	𲙊	𲙋	𲙌	𲙍	𲙎	𲙏
U+3265x	𲙐	𲙑	𲙒	𲙓	𲙔	𲙕	𲙖	𲙗	𲙘	𲙙	𲙚	𲙛	𲙜	𲙝	𲙞	𲙟
U+3266x	𲙠	𲙡	𲙢	𲙣	𲙤	𲙥	𲙦	𲙧	𲙨	𲙩	𲙪	𲙫	𲙬	𲙭	𲙮	𲙯
U+3267x	𲙰	𲙱	𲙲	𲙳	𲙴	𲙵	𲙶	𲙷	𲙸	𲙹	𲙺	𲙻	𲙼	𲙽	𲙾	𲙿
U+3268x	𲚀	𲚁	𲚂	𲚃	𲚄	𲚅	𲚆	𲚇	𲚈	𲚉	𲚊	𲚋	𲚌	𲚍	𲚎	𲚏
U+3269x	𲚐	𲚑	𲚒	𲚓	𲚔	𲚕	𲚖	𲚗	𲚘	𲚙	𲚚	𲚛	𲚜	𲚝	𲚞	𲚟
U+326Ax	𲚠	𲚡	𲚢	𲚣	𲚤	𲚥	𲚦	𲚧	𲚨	𲚩	𲚪	𲚫	𲚬	𲚭	𲚮	𲚯
U+326Bx	𲚰	𲚱	𲚲	𲚳	𲚴	𲚵	𲚶	𲚷	𲚸	𲚹	𲚺	𲚻	𲚼	𲚽	𲚾	𲚿
U+326Cx	𲛀	𲛁	𲛂	𲛃	𲛄	𲛅	𲛆	𲛇	𲛈	𲛉	𲛊	𲛋	𲛌	𲛍	𲛎	𲛏
U+326Dx	𲛐	𲛑	𲛒	𲛓	𲛔	𲛕	𲛖	𲛗	𲛘	𲛙	𲛚	𲛛	𲛜	𲛝	𲛞	𲛟
U+326Ex	𲛠	𲛡	𲛢	𲛣	𲛤	𲛥	𲛦	𲛧	𲛨	𲛩	𲛪	𲛫	𲛬	𲛭	𲛮	𲛯
U+326Fx	𲛰	𲛱	𲛲	𲛳	𲛴	𲛵	𲛶	𲛷	𲛸	𲛹	𲛺	𲛻	𲛼	𲛽	𲛾	𲛿
U+3270x	𲜀	𲜁	𲜂	𲜃	𲜄	𲜅	𲜆	𲜇	𲜈	𲜉	𲜊	𲜋	𲜌	𲜍	𲜎	𲜏
U+3271x	𲜐	𲜑	𲜒	𲜓	𲜔	𲜕	𲜖	𲜗	𲜘	𲜙	𲜚	𲜛	𲜜	𲜝	𲜞	𲜟
U+3272x	𲜠	𲜡	𲜢	𲜣	𲜤	𲜥	𲜦	𲜧	𲜨	𲜩	𲜪	𲜫	𲜬	𲜭	𲜮	𲜯
U+3273x	𲜰	𲜱	𲜲	𲜳	𲜴	𲜵	𲜶	𲜷	𲜸	𲜹	𲜺	𲜻	𲜼	𲜽	𲜾	𲜿
U+3274x	𲝀	𲝁	𲝂	𲝃	𲝄	𲝅	𲝆	𲝇	𲝈	𲝉	𲝊	𲝋	𲝌	𲝍	𲝎	𲝏
U+3275x	𲝐	𲝑	𲝒	𲝓	𲝔	𲝕	𲝖	𲝗	𲝘	𲝙	𲝚	𲝛	𲝜	𲝝	𲝞	𲝟
U+3276x	𲝠	𲝡	𲝢	𲝣	𲝤	𲝥	𲝦	𲝧	𲝨	𲝩	𲝪	𲝫	𲝬	𲝭	𲝮	𲝯
U+3277x	𲝰	𲝱	𲝲	𲝳	𲝴	𲝵	𲝶	𲝷	𲝸	𲝹	𲝺	𲝻	𲝼	𲝽	𲝾	𲝿
U+3278x	𲞀	𲞁	𲞂	𲞃	𲞄	𲞅	𲞆	𲞇	𲞈	𲞉	𲞊	𲞋	𲞌	𲞍	𲞎	𲞏
U+3279x	𲞐	𲞑	𲞒	𲞓	𲞔	𲞕	𲞖	𲞗	𲞘	𲞙	𲞚	𲞛	𲞜	𲞝	𲞞	𲞟
U+327Ax	𲞠	𲞡	𲞢	𲞣	𲞤	𲞥	𲞦	𲞧	𲞨	𲞩	𲞪	𲞫	𲞬	𲞭	𲞮	𲞯
U+327Bx	𲞰	𲞱	𲞲	𲞳	𲞴	𲞵	𲞶	𲞷	𲞸	𲞹	𲞺	𲞻	𲞼	𲞽	𲞾	𲞿
U+327Cx	𲟀	𲟁	𲟂	𲟃	𲟄	𲟅	𲟆	𲟇	𲟈	𲟉	𲟊	𲟋	𲟌	𲟍	𲟎	𲟏
U+327Dx	𲟐	𲟑	𲟒	𲟓	𲟔	𲟕	𲟖	𲟗	𲟘	𲟙	𲟚	𲟛	𲟜	𲟝	𲟞	𲟟
U+327Ex	𲟠	𲟡	𲟢	𲟣	𲟤	𲟥	𲟦	𲟧	𲟨	𲟩	𲟪	𲟫	𲟬	𲟭	𲟮	𲟯
U+327Fx	𲟰	𲟱	𲟲	𲟳	𲟴	𲟵	𲟶	𲟷	𲟸	𲟹	𲟺	𲟻	𲟼	𲟽	𲟾	𲟿
U+3280x	𲠀	𲠁	𲠂	𲠃	𲠄	𲠅	𲠆	𲠇	𲠈	𲠉	𲠊	𲠋	𲠌	𲠍	𲠎	𲠏
U+3281x	𲠐	𲠑	𲠒	𲠓	𲠔	𲠕	𲠖	𲠗	𲠘	𲠙	𲠚	𲠛	𲠜	𲠝	𲠞	𲠟
U+3282x	𲠠	𲠡	𲠢	𲠣	𲠤	𲠥	𲠦	𲠧	𲠨	𲠩	𲠪	𲠫	𲠬	𲠭	𲠮	𲠯
U+3283x	𲠰	𲠱	𲠲	𲠳	𲠴	𲠵	𲠶	𲠷	𲠸	𲠹	𲠺	𲠻	𲠼	𲠽	𲠾	𲠿
U+3284x	𲡀	𲡁	𲡂	𲡃	𲡄	𲡅	𲡆	𲡇	𲡈	𲡉	𲡊	𲡋	𲡌	𲡍	𲡎	𲡏
U+3285x	𲡐	𲡑	𲡒	𲡓	𲡔	𲡕	𲡖	𲡗	𲡘	𲡙	𲡚	𲡛	𲡜	𲡝	𲡞	𲡟
U+3286x	𲡠	𲡡	𲡢	𲡣	𲡤	𲡥	𲡦	𲡧	𲡨	𲡩	𲡪	𲡫	𲡬	𲡭	𲡮	𲡯
U+3287x	𲡰	𲡱	𲡲	𲡳	𲡴	𲡵	𲡶	𲡷	𲡸	𲡹	𲡺	𲡻	𲡼	𲡽	𲡾	𲡿
U+3288x	𲢀	𲢁	𲢂	𲢃	𲢄	𲢅	𲢆	𲢇	𲢈	𲢉	𲢊	𲢋	𲢌	𲢍	𲢎	𲢏
U+3289x	𲢐	𲢑	𲢒	𲢓	𲢔	𲢕	𲢖	𲢗	𲢘	𲢙	𲢚	𲢛	𲢜	𲢝	𲢞	𲢟
U+328Ax	𲢠	𲢡	𲢢	𲢣	𲢤	𲢥	𲢦	𲢧	𲢨	𲢩	𲢪	𲢫	𲢬	𲢭	𲢮	𲢯
U+328Bx	𲢰	𲢱	𲢲	𲢳	𲢴	𲢵	𲢶	𲢷	𲢸	𲢹	𲢺	𲢻	𲢼	𲢽	𲢾	𲢿
U+328Cx	𲣀	𲣁	𲣂	𲣃	𲣄	𲣅	𲣆	𲣇	𲣈	𲣉	𲣊	𲣋	𲣌	𲣍	𲣎	𲣏
U+328Dx	𲣐	𲣑	𲣒	𲣓	𲣔	𲣕	𲣖	𲣗	𲣘	𲣙	𲣚	𲣛	𲣜	𲣝	𲣞	𲣟
U+328Ex	𲣠	𲣡	𲣢	𲣣	𲣤	𲣥	𲣦	𲣧	𲣨	𲣩	𲣪	𲣫	𲣬	𲣭	𲣮	𲣯
U+328Fx	𲣰	𲣱	𲣲	𲣳	𲣴	𲣵	𲣶	𲣷	𲣸	𲣹	𲣺	𲣻	𲣼	𲣽	𲣾	𲣿
U+3290x	𲤀	𲤁	𲤂	𲤃	𲤄	𲤅	𲤆	𲤇	𲤈	𲤉	𲤊	𲤋	𲤌	𲤍	𲤎	𲤏
U+3291x	𲤐	𲤑	𲤒	𲤓	𲤔	𲤕	𲤖	𲤗	𲤘	𲤙	𲤚	𲤛	𲤜	𲤝	𲤞	𲤟
U+3292x	𲤠	𲤡	𲤢	𲤣	𲤤	𲤥	𲤦	𲤧	𲤨	𲤩	𲤪	𲤫	𲤬	𲤭	𲤮	𲤯
U+3293x	𲤰	𲤱	𲤲	𲤳	𲤴	𲤵	𲤶	𲤷	𲤸	𲤹	𲤺	𲤻	𲤼	𲤽	𲤾	𲤿
U+3294x	𲥀	𲥁	𲥂	𲥃	𲥄	𲥅	𲥆	𲥇	𲥈	𲥉	𲥊	𲥋	𲥌	𲥍	𲥎	𲥏
U+3295x	𲥐	𲥑	𲥒	𲥓	𲥔	𲥕	𲥖	𲥗	𲥘	𲥙	𲥚	𲥛	𲥜	𲥝	𲥞	𲥟
U+3296x	𲥠	𲥡	𲥢	𲥣	𲥤	𲥥	𲥦	𲥧	𲥨	𲥩	𲥪	𲥫	𲥬	𲥭	𲥮	𲥯
U+3297x	𲥰	𲥱	𲥲	𲥳	𲥴	𲥵	𲥶	𲥷	𲥸	𲥹	𲥺	𲥻	𲥼	𲥽	𲥾	𲥿
U+3298x	𲦀	𲦁	𲦂	𲦃	𲦄	𲦅	𲦆	𲦇	𲦈	𲦉	𲦊	𲦋	𲦌	𲦍	𲦎	𲦏
U+3299x	𲦐	𲦑	𲦒	𲦓	𲦔	𲦕	𲦖	𲦗	𲦘	𲦙	𲦚	𲦛	𲦜	𲦝	𲦞	𲦟
U+329Ax	𲦠	𲦡	𲦢	𲦣	𲦤	𲦥	𲦦	𲦧	𲦨	𲦩	𲦪	𲦫	𲦬	𲦭	𲦮	𲦯
U+329Bx	𲦰	𲦱	𲦲	𲦳	𲦴	𲦵	𲦶	𲦷	𲦸	𲦹	𲦺	𲦻	𲦼	𲦽	𲦾	𲦿
U+329Cx	𲧀	𲧁	𲧂	𲧃	𲧄	𲧅	𲧆	𲧇	𲧈	𲧉	𲧊	𲧋	𲧌	𲧍	𲧎	𲧏
U+329Dx	𲧐	𲧑	𲧒	𲧓	𲧔	𲧕	𲧖	𲧗	𲧘	𲧙	𲧚	𲧛	𲧜	𲧝	𲧞	𲧟
U+329Ex	𲧠	𲧡	𲧢	𲧣	𲧤	𲧥	𲧦	𲧧	𲧨	𲧩	𲧪	𲧫	𲧬	𲧭	𲧮	𲧯
U+329Fx	𲧰	𲧱	𲧲	𲧳	𲧴	𲧵	𲧶	𲧷	𲧸	𲧹	𲧺	𲧻	𲧼	𲧽	𲧾	𲧿
U+32A0x	𲨀	𲨁	𲨂	𲨃	𲨄	𲨅	𲨆	𲨇	𲨈	𲨉	𲨊	𲨋	𲨌	𲨍	𲨎	𲨏
U+32A1x	𲨐	𲨑	𲨒	𲨓	𲨔	𲨕	𲨖	𲨗	𲨘	𲨙	𲨚	𲨛	𲨜	𲨝	𲨞	𲨟
U+32A2x	𲨠	𲨡	𲨢	𲨣	𲨤	𲨥	𲨦	𲨧	𲨨	𲨩	𲨪	𲨫	𲨬	𲨭	𲨮	𲨯
U+32A3x	𲨰	𲨱	𲨲	𲨳	𲨴	𲨵	𲨶	𲨷	𲨸	𲨹	𲨺	𲨻	𲨼	𲨽	𲨾	𲨿
U+32A4x	𲩀	𲩁	𲩂	𲩃	𲩄	𲩅	𲩆	𲩇	𲩈	𲩉	𲩊	𲩋	𲩌	𲩍	𲩎	𲩏
U+32A5x	𲩐	𲩑	𲩒	𲩓	𲩔	𲩕	𲩖	𲩗	𲩘	𲩙	𲩚	𲩛	𲩜	𲩝	𲩞	𲩟
U+32A6x	𲩠	𲩡	𲩢	𲩣	𲩤	𲩥	𲩦	𲩧	𲩨	𲩩	𲩪	𲩫	𲩬	𲩭	𲩮	𲩯
U+32A7x	𲩰	𲩱	𲩲	𲩳	𲩴	𲩵	𲩶	𲩷	𲩸	𲩹	𲩺	𲩻	𲩼	𲩽	𲩾	𲩿
U+32A8x	𲪀	𲪁	𲪂	𲪃	𲪄	𲪅	𲪆	𲪇	𲪈	𲪉	𲪊	𲪋	𲪌	𲪍	𲪎	𲪏
U+32A9x	𲪐	𲪑	𲪒	𲪓	𲪔	𲪕	𲪖	𲪗	𲪘	𲪙	𲪚	𲪛	𲪜	𲪝	𲪞	𲪟
U+32AAx	𲪠	𲪡	𲪢	𲪣	𲪤	𲪥	𲪦	𲪧	𲪨	𲪩	𲪪	𲪫	𲪬	𲪭	𲪮	𲪯
U+32ABx	𲪰	𲪱	𲪲	𲪳	𲪴	𲪵	𲪶	𲪷	𲪸	𲪹	𲪺	𲪻	𲪼	𲪽	𲪾	𲪿
U+32ACx	𲫀	𲫁	𲫂	𲫃	𲫄	𲫅	𲫆	𲫇	𲫈	𲫉	𲫊	𲫋	𲫌	𲫍	𲫎	𲫏
U+32ADx	𲫐	𲫑	𲫒	𲫓	𲫔	𲫕	𲫖	𲫗	𲫘	𲫙	𲫚	𲫛	𲫜	𲫝	𲫞	𲫟
U+32AEx	𲫠	𲫡	𲫢	𲫣	𲫤	𲫥	𲫦	𲫧	𲫨	𲫩	𲫪	𲫫	𲫬	𲫭	𲫮	𲫯
U+32AFx	𲫰	𲫱	𲫲	𲫳	𲫴	𲫵	𲫶	𲫷	𲫸	𲫹	𲫺	𲫻	𲫼	𲫽	𲫾	𲫿
U+32B0x	𲬀	𲬁	𲬂	𲬃	𲬄	𲬅	𲬆	𲬇	𲬈	𲬉	𲬊	𲬋	𲬌	𲬍	𲬎	𲬏
U+32B1x	𲬐	𲬑	𲬒	𲬓	𲬔	𲬕	𲬖	𲬗	𲬘	𲬙	𲬚	𲬛	𲬜	𲬝	𲬞	𲬟
U+32B2x	𲬠	𲬡	𲬢	𲬣	𲬤	𲬥	𲬦	𲬧	𲬨	𲬩	𲬪	𲬫	𲬬	𲬭	𲬮	𲬯
U+32B3x	𲬰	𲬱	𲬲	𲬳	𲬴	𲬵	𲬶	𲬷	𲬸	𲬹	𲬺	𲬻	𲬼	𲬽	𲬾	𲬿
U+32B4x	𲭀	𲭁	𲭂	𲭃	𲭄	𲭅	𲭆	𲭇	𲭈	𲭉	𲭊	𲭋	𲭌	𲭍	𲭎	𲭏
U+32B5x	𲭐	𲭑	𲭒	𲭓	𲭔	𲭕	𲭖	𲭗	𲭘	𲭙	𲭚	𲭛	𲭜	𲭝	𲭞	𲭟
U+32B6x	𲭠	𲭡	𲭢	𲭣	𲭤	𲭥	𲭦	𲭧	𲭨	𲭩	𲭪	𲭫	𲭬	𲭭	𲭮	𲭯
U+32B7x	𲭰	𲭱	𲭲	𲭳	𲭴	𲭵	𲭶	𲭷	𲭸	𲭹	𲭺	𲭻	𲭼	𲭽	𲭾	𲭿
U+32B8x	𲮀	𲮁	𲮂	𲮃	𲮄	𲮅	𲮆	𲮇	𲮈	𲮉	𲮊	𲮋	𲮌	𲮍	𲮎	𲮏
U+32B9x	𲮐	𲮑	𲮒	𲮓	𲮔	𲮕	𲮖	𲮗	𲮘	𲮙	𲮚	𲮛	𲮜	𲮝	𲮞	𲮟
U+32BAx	𲮠	𲮡	𲮢	𲮣	𲮤	𲮥	𲮦	𲮧	𲮨	𲮩	𲮪	𲮫	𲮬	𲮭	𲮮	𲮯
U+32BBx	𲮰	𲮱	𲮲	𲮳	𲮴	𲮵	𲮶	𲮷	𲮸	𲮹	𲮺	𲮻	𲮼	𲮽	𲮾	𲮿
U+32BCx	𲯀	𲯁	𲯂	𲯃	𲯄	𲯅	𲯆	𲯇	𲯈	𲯉	𲯊	𲯋	𲯌	𲯍	𲯎	𲯏
U+32BDx	𲯐	𲯑	𲯒	𲯓	𲯔	𲯕	𲯖	𲯗	𲯘	𲯙	𲯚	𲯛	𲯜	𲯝	𲯞	𲯟
U+32BEx	𲯠	𲯡	𲯢	𲯣	𲯤	𲯥	𲯦	𲯧	𲯨	𲯩	𲯪	𲯫	𲯬	𲯭	𲯮	𲯯
U+32BFx	𲯰	𲯱	𲯲	𲯳	𲯴	𲯵	𲯶	𲯷	𲯸	𲯹	𲯺	𲯻	𲯼	𲯽	𲯾	𲯿
U+32C0x	𲰀	𲰁	𲰂	𲰃	𲰄	𲰅	𲰆	𲰇	𲰈	𲰉	𲰊	𲰋	𲰌	𲰍	𲰎	𲰏
U+32C1x	𲰐	𲰑	𲰒	𲰓	𲰔	𲰕	𲰖	𲰗	𲰘	𲰙	𲰚	𲰛	𲰜	𲰝	𲰞	𲰟
U+32C2x	𲰠	𲰡	𲰢	𲰣	𲰤	𲰥	𲰦	𲰧	𲰨	𲰩	𲰪	𲰫	𲰬	𲰭	𲰮	𲰯
U+32C3x	𲰰	𲰱	𲰲	𲰳	𲰴	𲰵	𲰶	𲰷	𲰸	𲰹	𲰺	𲰻	𲰼	𲰽	𲰾	𲰿
U+32C4x	𲱀	𲱁	𲱂	𲱃	𲱄	𲱅	𲱆	𲱇	𲱈	𲱉	𲱊	𲱋	𲱌	𲱍	𲱎	𲱏
U+32C5x	𲱐	𲱑	𲱒	𲱓	𲱔	𲱕	𲱖	𲱗	𲱘	𲱙	𲱚	𲱛	𲱜	𲱝	𲱞	𲱟
U+32C6x	𲱠	𲱡	𲱢	𲱣	𲱤	𲱥	𲱦	𲱧	𲱨	𲱩	𲱪	𲱫	𲱬	𲱭	𲱮	𲱯
U+32C7x	𲱰	𲱱	𲱲	𲱳	𲱴	𲱵	𲱶	𲱷	𲱸	𲱹	𲱺	𲱻	𲱼	𲱽	𲱾	𲱿
U+32C8x	𲲀	𲲁	𲲂	𲲃	𲲄	𲲅	𲲆	𲲇	𲲈	𲲉	𲲊	𲲋	𲲌	𲲍	𲲎	𲲏
U+32C9x	𲲐	𲲑	𲲒	𲲓	𲲔	𲲕	𲲖	𲲗	𲲘	𲲙	𲲚	𲲛	𲲜	𲲝	𲲞	𲲟
U+32CAx	𲲠	𲲡	𲲢	𲲣	𲲤	𲲥	𲲦	𲲧	𲲨	𲲩	𲲪	𲲫	𲲬	𲲭	𲲮	𲲯
U+32CBx	𲲰	𲲱	𲲲	𲲳	𲲴	𲲵	𲲶	𲲷	𲲸	𲲹	𲲺	𲲻	𲲼	𲲽	𲲾	𲲿
U+32CCx	𲳀	𲳁	𲳂	𲳃	𲳄	𲳅	𲳆	𲳇	𲳈	𲳉	𲳊	𲳋	𲳌	𲳍	𲳎	𲳏
U+32CDx	𲳐	𲳑	𲳒	𲳓	𲳔	𲳕	𲳖	𲳗	𲳘	𲳙	𲳚	𲳛	𲳜	𲳝	𲳞	𲳟
U+32CEx	𲳠	𲳡	𲳢	𲳣	𲳤	𲳥	𲳦	𲳧	𲳨	𲳩	𲳪	𲳫	𲳬	𲳭	𲳮	𲳯
U+32CFx	𲳰	𲳱	𲳲	𲳳	𲳴	𲳵	𲳶	𲳷	𲳸	𲳹	𲳺	𲳻	𲳼	𲳽	𲳾	𲳿
U+32D0x	𲴀	𲴁	𲴂	𲴃	𲴄	𲴅	𲴆	𲴇	𲴈	𲴉	𲴊	𲴋	𲴌	𲴍	𲴎	𲴏
U+32D1x	𲴐	𲴑	𲴒	𲴓	𲴔	𲴕	𲴖	𲴗	𲴘	𲴙	𲴚	𲴛	𲴜	𲴝	𲴞	𲴟
U+32D2x	𲴠	𲴡	𲴢	𲴣	𲴤	𲴥	𲴦	𲴧	𲴨	𲴩	𲴪	𲴫	𲴬	𲴭	𲴮	𲴯
U+32D3x	𲴰	𲴱	𲴲	𲴳	𲴴	𲴵	𲴶	𲴷	𲴸	𲴹	𲴺	𲴻	𲴼	𲴽	𲴾	𲴿
U+32D4x	𲵀	𲵁	𲵂	𲵃	𲵄	𲵅	𲵆	𲵇	𲵈	𲵉	𲵊	𲵋	𲵌	𲵍	𲵎	𲵏
U+32D5x	𲵐	𲵑	𲵒	𲵓	𲵔	𲵕	𲵖	𲵗	𲵘	𲵙	𲵚	𲵛	𲵜	𲵝	𲵞	𲵟
U+32D6x	𲵠	𲵡	𲵢	𲵣	𲵤	𲵥	𲵦	𲵧	𲵨	𲵩	𲵪	𲵫	𲵬	𲵭	𲵮	𲵯
U+32D7x	𲵰	𲵱	𲵲	𲵳	𲵴	𲵵	𲵶	𲵷	𲵸	𲵹	𲵺	𲵻	𲵼	𲵽	𲵾	𲵿
U+32D8x	𲶀	𲶁	𲶂	𲶃	𲶄	𲶅	𲶆	𲶇	𲶈	𲶉	𲶊	𲶋	𲶌	𲶍	𲶎	𲶏
U+32D9x	𲶐	𲶑	𲶒	𲶓	𲶔	𲶕	𲶖	𲶗	𲶘	𲶙	𲶚	𲶛	𲶜	𲶝	𲶞	𲶟
U+32DAx	𲶠	𲶡	𲶢	𲶣	𲶤	𲶥	𲶦	𲶧	𲶨	𲶩	𲶪	𲶫	𲶬	𲶭	𲶮	𲶯
U+32DBx	𲶰	𲶱	𲶲	𲶳	𲶴	𲶵	𲶶	𲶷	𲶸	𲶹	𲶺	𲶻	𲶼	𲶽	𲶾	𲶿
U+32DCx	𲷀	𲷁	𲷂	𲷃	𲷄	𲷅	𲷆	𲷇	𲷈	𲷉	𲷊	𲷋	𲷌	𲷍	𲷎	𲷏
U+32DDx	𲷐	𲷑	𲷒	𲷓	𲷔	𲷕	𲷖	𲷗	𲷘	𲷙	𲷚	𲷛	𲷜	𲷝	𲷞	𲷟
U+32DEx	𲷠	𲷡	𲷢	𲷣	𲷤	𲷥	𲷦	𲷧	𲷨	𲷩	𲷪	𲷫	𲷬	𲷭	𲷮	𲷯
U+32DFx	𲷰	𲷱	𲷲	𲷳	𲷴	𲷵	𲷶	𲷷	𲷸	𲷹	𲷺	𲷻	𲷼	𲷽	𲷾	𲷿
U+32E0x	𲸀	𲸁	𲸂	𲸃	𲸄	𲸅	𲸆	𲸇	𲸈	𲸉	𲸊	𲸋	𲸌	𲸍	𲸎	𲸏
U+32E1x	𲸐	𲸑	𲸒	𲸓	𲸔	𲸕	𲸖	𲸗	𲸘	𲸙	𲸚	𲸛	𲸜	𲸝	𲸞	𲸟
U+32E2x	𲸠	𲸡	𲸢	𲸣	𲸤	𲸥	𲸦	𲸧	𲸨	𲸩	𲸪	𲸫	𲸬	𲸭	𲸮	𲸯
U+32E3x	𲸰	𲸱	𲸲	𲸳	𲸴	𲸵	𲸶	𲸷	𲸸	𲸹	𲸺	𲸻	𲸼	𲸽	𲸾	𲸿
U+32E4x	𲹀	𲹁	𲹂	𲹃	𲹄	𲹅	𲹆	𲹇	𲹈	𲹉	𲹊	𲹋	𲹌	𲹍	𲹎	𲹏
U+32E5x	𲹐	𲹑	𲹒	𲹓	𲹔	𲹕	𲹖	𲹗	𲹘	𲹙	𲹚	𲹛	𲹜	𲹝	𲹞	𲹟
U+32E6x	𲹠	𲹡	𲹢	𲹣	𲹤	𲹥	𲹦	𲹧	𲹨	𲹩	𲹪	𲹫	𲹬	𲹭	𲹮	𲹯
U+32E7x	𲹰	𲹱	𲹲	𲹳	𲹴	𲹵	𲹶	𲹷	𲹸	𲹹	𲹺	𲹻	𲹼	𲹽	𲹾	𲹿
U+32E8x	𲺀	𲺁	𲺂	𲺃	𲺄	𲺅	𲺆	𲺇	𲺈	𲺉	𲺊	𲺋	𲺌	𲺍	𲺎	𲺏
U+32E9x	𲺐	𲺑	𲺒	𲺓	𲺔	𲺕	𲺖	𲺗	𲺘	𲺙	𲺚	𲺛	𲺜	𲺝	𲺞	𲺟
U+32EAx	𲺠	𲺡	𲺢	𲺣	𲺤	𲺥	𲺦	𲺧	𲺨	𲺩	𲺪	𲺫	𲺬	𲺭	𲺮	𲺯
U+32EBx	𲺰	𲺱	𲺲	𲺳	𲺴	𲺵	𲺶	𲺷	𲺸	𲺹	𲺺	𲺻	𲺼	𲺽	𲺾	𲺿
U+32ECx	𲻀	𲻁	𲻂	𲻃	𲻄	𲻅	𲻆	𲻇	𲻈	𲻉	𲻊	𲻋	𲻌	𲻍	𲻎	𲻏
U+32EDx	𲻐	𲻑	𲻒	𲻓	𲻔	𲻕	𲻖	𲻗	𲻘	𲻙	𲻚	𲻛	𲻜	𲻝	𲻞	𲻟
U+32EEx	𲻠	𲻡	𲻢	𲻣	𲻤	𲻥	𲻦	𲻧	𲻨	𲻩	𲻪	𲻫	𲻬	𲻭	𲻮	𲻯
U+32EFx	𲻰	𲻱	𲻲	𲻳	𲻴	𲻵	𲻶	𲻷	𲻸	𲻹	𲻺	𲻻	𲻼	𲻽	𲻾	𲻿
U+32F0x	𲼀	𲼁	𲼂	𲼃	𲼄	𲼅	𲼆	𲼇	𲼈	𲼉	𲼊	𲼋	𲼌	𲼍	𲼎	𲼏
U+32F1x	𲼐	𲼑	𲼒	𲼓	𲼔	𲼕	𲼖	𲼗	𲼘	𲼙	𲼚	𲼛	𲼜	𲼝	𲼞	𲼟
U+32F2x	𲼠	𲼡	𲼢	𲼣	𲼤	𲼥	𲼦	𲼧	𲼨	𲼩	𲼪	𲼫	𲼬	𲼭	𲼮	𲼯
U+32F3x	𲼰	𲼱	𲼲	𲼳	𲼴	𲼵	𲼶	𲼷	𲼸	𲼹	𲼺	𲼻	𲼼	𲼽	𲼾	𲼿
U+32F4x	𲽀	𲽁	𲽂	𲽃	𲽄	𲽅	𲽆	𲽇	𲽈	𲽉	𲽊	𲽋	𲽌	𲽍	𲽎	𲽏
U+32F5x	𲽐	𲽑	𲽒	𲽓	𲽔	𲽕	𲽖	𲽗	𲽘	𲽙	𲽚	𲽛	𲽜	𲽝	𲽞	𲽟
U+32F6x	𲽠	𲽡	𲽢	𲽣	𲽤	𲽥	𲽦	𲽧	𲽨	𲽩	𲽪	𲽫	𲽬	𲽭	𲽮	𲽯
U+32F7x	𲽰	𲽱	𲽲	𲽳	𲽴	𲽵	𲽶	𲽷	𲽸	𲽹	𲽺	𲽻	𲽼	𲽽	𲽾	𲽿
U+32F8x	𲾀	𲾁	𲾂	𲾃	𲾄	𲾅	𲾆	𲾇	𲾈	𲾉	𲾊	𲾋	𲾌	𲾍	𲾎	𲾏
U+32F9x	𲾐	𲾑	𲾒	𲾓	𲾔	𲾕	𲾖	𲾗	𲾘	𲾙	𲾚	𲾛	𲾜	𲾝	𲾞	𲾟
U+32FAx	𲾠	𲾡	𲾢	𲾣	𲾤	𲾥	𲾦	𲾧	𲾨	𲾩	𲾪	𲾫	𲾬	𲾭	𲾮	𲾯
U+32FBx	𲾰	𲾱	𲾲	𲾳	𲾴	𲾵	𲾶	𲾷	𲾸	𲾹	𲾺	𲾻	𲾼	𲾽	𲾾	𲾿
U+32FCx	𲿀	𲿁	𲿂	𲿃	𲿄	𲿅	𲿆	𲿇	𲿈	𲿉	𲿊	𲿋	𲿌	𲿍	𲿎	𲿏
U+32FDx	𲿐	𲿑	𲿒	𲿓	𲿔	𲿕	𲿖	𲿗	𲿘	𲿙	𲿚	𲿛	𲿜	𲿝	𲿞	𲿟
U+32FEx	𲿠	𲿡	𲿢	𲿣	𲿤	𲿥	𲿦	𲿧	𲿨	𲿩	𲿪	𲿫	𲿬	𲿭	𲿮	𲿯
U+32FFx	𲿰	𲿱	𲿲	𲿳	𲿴	𲿵	𲿶	𲿷	𲿸	𲿹	𲿺	𲿻	𲿼	𲿽	𲿾	𲿿
U+3300x	𳀀	𳀁	𳀂	𳀃	𳀄	𳀅	𳀆	𳀇	𳀈	𳀉	𳀊	𳀋	𳀌	𳀍	𳀎	𳀏
U+3301x	𳀐	𳀑	𳀒	𳀓	𳀔	𳀕	𳀖	𳀗	𳀘	𳀙	𳀚	𳀛	𳀜	𳀝	𳀞	𳀟
U+3302x	𳀠	𳀡	𳀢	𳀣	𳀤	𳀥	𳀦	𳀧	𳀨	𳀩	𳀪	𳀫	𳀬	𳀭	𳀮	𳀯
U+3303x	𳀰	𳀱	𳀲	𳀳	𳀴	𳀵	𳀶	𳀷	𳀸	𳀹	𳀺	𳀻	𳀼	𳀽	𳀾	𳀿
U+3304x	𳁀	𳁁	𳁂	𳁃	𳁄	𳁅	𳁆	𳁇	𳁈	𳁉	𳁊	𳁋	𳁌	𳁍	𳁎	𳁏
U+3305x	𳁐	𳁑	𳁒	𳁓	𳁔	𳁕	𳁖	𳁗	𳁘	𳁙	𳁚	𳁛	𳁜	𳁝	𳁞	𳁟
U+3306x	𳁠	𳁡	𳁢	𳁣	𳁤	𳁥	𳁦	𳁧	𳁨	𳁩	𳁪	𳁫	𳁬	𳁭	𳁮	𳁯
U+3307x	𳁰	𳁱	𳁲	𳁳	𳁴	𳁵	𳁶	𳁷	𳁸	𳁹	𳁺	𳁻	𳁼	𳁽	𳁾	𳁿
U+3308x	𳂀	𳂁	𳂂	𳂃	𳂄	𳂅	𳂆	𳂇	𳂈	𳂉	𳂊	𳂋	𳂌	𳂍	𳂎	𳂏
U+3309x	𳂐	𳂑	𳂒	𳂓	𳂔	𳂕	𳂖	𳂗	𳂘	𳂙	𳂚	𳂛	𳂜	𳂝	𳂞	𳂟
U+330Ax	𳂠	𳂡	𳂢	𳂣	𳂤	𳂥	𳂦	𳂧	𳂨	𳂩	𳂪	𳂫	𳂬	𳂭	𳂮	𳂯
U+330Bx	𳂰	𳂱	𳂲	𳂳	𳂴	𳂵	𳂶	𳂷	𳂸	𳂹	𳂺	𳂻	𳂼	𳂽	𳂾	𳂿
U+330Cx	𳃀	𳃁	𳃂	𳃃	𳃄	𳃅	𳃆	𳃇	𳃈	𳃉	𳃊	𳃋	𳃌	𳃍	𳃎	𳃏
U+330Dx	𳃐	𳃑	𳃒	𳃓	𳃔	𳃕	𳃖	𳃗	𳃘	𳃙	𳃚	𳃛	𳃜	𳃝	𳃞	𳃟
U+330Ex	𳃠	𳃡	𳃢	𳃣	𳃤	𳃥	𳃦	𳃧	𳃨	𳃩	𳃪	𳃫	𳃬	𳃭	𳃮	𳃯
U+330Fx	𳃰	𳃱	𳃲	𳃳	𳃴	𳃵	𳃶	𳃷	𳃸	𳃹	𳃺	𳃻	𳃼	𳃽	𳃾	𳃿
U+3310x	𳄀	𳄁	𳄂	𳄃	𳄄	𳄅	𳄆	𳄇	𳄈	𳄉	𳄊	𳄋	𳄌	𳄍	𳄎	𳄏
U+3311x	𳄐	𳄑	𳄒	𳄓	𳄔	𳄕	𳄖	𳄗	𳄘	𳄙	𳄚	𳄛	𳄜	𳄝	𳄞	𳄟
U+3312x	𳄠	𳄡	𳄢	𳄣	𳄤	𳄥	𳄦	𳄧	𳄨	𳄩	𳄪	𳄫	𳄬	𳄭	𳄮	𳄯
U+3313x	𳄰	𳄱	𳄲	𳄳	𳄴	𳄵	𳄶	𳄷	𳄸	𳄹	𳄺	𳄻	𳄼	𳄽	𳄾	𳄿
U+3314x	𳅀	𳅁	𳅂	𳅃	𳅄	𳅅	𳅆	𳅇	𳅈	𳅉	𳅊	𳅋	𳅌	𳅍	𳅎	𳅏
U+3315x	𳅐	𳅑	𳅒	𳅓	𳅔	𳅕	𳅖	𳅗	𳅘	𳅙	𳅚	𳅛	𳅜	𳅝	𳅞	𳅟
U+3316x	𳅠	𳅡	𳅢	𳅣	𳅤	𳅥	𳅦	𳅧	𳅨	𳅩	𳅪	𳅫	𳅬	𳅭	𳅮	𳅯
U+3317x	𳅰	𳅱	𳅲	𳅳	𳅴	𳅵	𳅶	𳅷	𳅸	𳅹	𳅺	𳅻	𳅼	𳅽	𳅾	𳅿
U+3318x	𳆀	𳆁	𳆂	𳆃	𳆄	𳆅	𳆆	𳆇	𳆈	𳆉	𳆊	𳆋	𳆌	𳆍	𳆎	𳆏
U+3319x	𳆐	𳆑	𳆒	𳆓	𳆔	𳆕	𳆖	𳆗	𳆘	𳆙	𳆚	𳆛	𳆜	𳆝	𳆞	𳆟
U+331Ax	𳆠	𳆡	𳆢	𳆣	𳆤	𳆥	𳆦	𳆧	𳆨	𳆩	𳆪	𳆫	𳆬	𳆭	𳆮	𳆯
U+331Bx	𳆰	𳆱	𳆲	𳆳	𳆴	𳆵	𳆶	𳆷	𳆸	𳆹	𳆺	𳆻	𳆼	𳆽	𳆾	𳆿
U+331Cx	𳇀	𳇁	𳇂	𳇃	𳇄	𳇅	𳇆	𳇇	𳇈	𳇉	𳇊	𳇋	𳇌	𳇍	𳇎	𳇏
U+331Dx	𳇐	𳇑	𳇒	𳇓	𳇔	𳇕	𳇖	𳇗	𳇘	𳇙	𳇚	𳇛	𳇜	𳇝	𳇞	𳇟
U+331Ex	𳇠	𳇡	𳇢	𳇣	𳇤	𳇥	𳇦	𳇧	𳇨	𳇩	𳇪	𳇫	𳇬	𳇭	𳇮	𳇯
U+331Fx	𳇰	𳇱	𳇲	𳇳	𳇴	𳇵	𳇶	𳇷	𳇸	𳇹	𳇺	𳇻	𳇼	𳇽	𳇾	𳇿
U+3320x	𳈀	𳈁	𳈂	𳈃	𳈄	𳈅	𳈆	𳈇	𳈈	𳈉	𳈊	𳈋	𳈌	𳈍	𳈎	𳈏
U+3321x	𳈐	𳈑	𳈒	𳈓	𳈔	𳈕	𳈖	𳈗	𳈘	𳈙	𳈚	𳈛	𳈜	𳈝	𳈞	𳈟
U+3322x	𳈠	𳈡	𳈢	𳈣	𳈤	𳈥	𳈦	𳈧	𳈨	𳈩	𳈪	𳈫	𳈬	𳈭	𳈮	𳈯
U+3323x	𳈰	𳈱	𳈲	𳈳	𳈴	𳈵	𳈶	𳈷	𳈸	𳈹	𳈺	𳈻	𳈼	𳈽	𳈾	𳈿
U+3324x	𳉀	𳉁	𳉂	𳉃	𳉄	𳉅	𳉆	𳉇	𳉈	𳉉	𳉊	𳉋	𳉌	𳉍	𳉎	𳉏
U+3325x	𳉐	𳉑	𳉒	𳉓	𳉔	𳉕	𳉖	𳉗	𳉘	𳉙	𳉚	𳉛	𳉜	𳉝	𳉞	𳉟
U+3326x	𳉠	𳉡	𳉢	𳉣	𳉤	𳉥	𳉦	𳉧	𳉨	𳉩	𳉪	𳉫	𳉬	𳉭	𳉮	𳉯
U+3327x	𳉰	𳉱	𳉲	𳉳	𳉴	𳉵	𳉶	𳉷	𳉸	𳉹	𳉺	𳉻	𳉼	𳉽	𳉾	𳉿
U+3328x	𳊀	𳊁	𳊂	𳊃	𳊄	𳊅	𳊆	𳊇	𳊈	𳊉	𳊊	𳊋	𳊌	𳊍	𳊎	𳊏
U+3329x	𳊐	𳊑	𳊒	𳊓	𳊔	𳊕	𳊖	𳊗	𳊘	𳊙	𳊚	𳊛	𳊜	𳊝	𳊞	𳊟
U+332Ax	𳊠	𳊡	𳊢	𳊣	𳊤	𳊥	𳊦	𳊧	𳊨	𳊩	𳊪	𳊫	𳊬	𳊭	𳊮	𳊯
U+332Bx	𳊰	𳊱	𳊲	𳊳	𳊴	𳊵	𳊶	𳊷	𳊸	𳊹	𳊺	𳊻	𳊼	𳊽	𳊾	𳊿
U+332Cx	𳋀	𳋁	𳋂	𳋃	𳋄	𳋅	𳋆	𳋇	𳋈	𳋉	𳋊	𳋋	𳋌	𳋍	𳋎	𳋏
U+332Dx	𳋐	𳋑	𳋒	𳋓	𳋔	𳋕	𳋖	𳋗	𳋘	𳋙	𳋚	𳋛	𳋜	𳋝	𳋞	𳋟
U+332Ex	𳋠	𳋡	𳋢	𳋣	𳋤	𳋥	𳋦	𳋧	𳋨	𳋩	𳋪	𳋫	𳋬	𳋭	𳋮	𳋯
U+332Fx	𳋰	𳋱	𳋲	𳋳	𳋴	𳋵	𳋶	𳋷	𳋸	𳋹	𳋺	𳋻	𳋼	𳋽	𳋾	𳋿
U+3330x	𳌀	𳌁	𳌂	𳌃	𳌄	𳌅	𳌆	𳌇	𳌈	𳌉	𳌊	𳌋	𳌌	𳌍	𳌎	𳌏
U+3331x	𳌐	𳌑	𳌒	𳌓	𳌔	𳌕	𳌖	𳌗	𳌘	𳌙	𳌚	𳌛	𳌜	𳌝	𳌞	𳌟
U+3332x	𳌠	𳌡	𳌢	𳌣	𳌤	𳌥	𳌦	𳌧	𳌨	𳌩	𳌪	𳌫	𳌬	𳌭	𳌮	𳌯
U+3333x	𳌰	𳌱	𳌲	𳌳	𳌴	𳌵	𳌶	𳌷	𳌸	𳌹	𳌺	𳌻	𳌼	𳌽	𳌾	𳌿
U+3334x	𳍀	𳍁	𳍂	𳍃	𳍄	𳍅	𳍆	𳍇	𳍈	𳍉	𳍊	𳍋	𳍌	𳍍	𳍎	𳍏
U+3335x	𳍐	𳍑	𳍒	𳍓	𳍔	𳍕	𳍖	𳍗	𳍘	𳍙	𳍚	𳍛	𳍜	𳍝	𳍞	𳍟
U+3336x	𳍠	𳍡	𳍢	𳍣	𳍤	𳍥	𳍦	𳍧	𳍨	𳍩	𳍪	𳍫	𳍬	𳍭	𳍮	𳍯
U+3337x	𳍰	𳍱	𳍲	𳍳	𳍴	𳍵	𳍶	𳍷	𳍸	𳍹	𳍺	𳍻	𳍼	𳍽	𳍾	𳍿
U+3338x	𳎀	𳎁	𳎂	𳎃	𳎄	𳎅	𳎆	𳎇	𳎈	𳎉	𳎊	𳎋	𳎌	𳎍	𳎎	𳎏
U+3339x	𳎐	𳎑	𳎒	𳎓	𳎔	𳎕	𳎖	𳎗	𳎘	𳎙	𳎚	𳎛	𳎜	𳎝	𳎞	𳎟
U+333Ax	𳎠	𳎡	𳎢	𳎣	𳎤	𳎥	𳎦	𳎧	𳎨	𳎩	𳎪	𳎫	𳎬	𳎭	𳎮	𳎯
U+333Bx	𳎰	𳎱	𳎲	𳎳	𳎴	𳎵	𳎶	𳎷	𳎸	𳎹	𳎺	𳎻	𳎼	𳎽	𳎾	𳎿
U+333Cx	𳏀	𳏁	𳏂	𳏃	𳏄	𳏅	𳏆	𳏇	𳏈	𳏉	𳏊	𳏋	𳏌	𳏍	𳏎	𳏏
U+333Dx	𳏐	𳏑	𳏒	𳏓	𳏔	𳏕	𳏖	𳏗	𳏘	𳏙	𳏚	𳏛	𳏜	𳏝	𳏞	𳏟
U+333Ex	𳏠	𳏡	𳏢	𳏣	𳏤	𳏥	𳏦	𳏧	𳏨	𳏩	𳏪	𳏫	𳏬	𳏭	𳏮	𳏯
U+333Fx	𳏰	𳏱	𳏲	𳏳	𳏴	𳏵	𳏶	𳏷	𳏸	𳏹	𳏺	𳏻	𳏼	𳏽	𳏾	𳏿
U+3340x	𳐀	𳐁	𳐂	𳐃	𳐄	𳐅	𳐆	𳐇	𳐈	𳐉	𳐊	𳐋	𳐌	𳐍	𳐎	𳐏
U+3341x	𳐐	𳐑	𳐒	𳐓	𳐔	𳐕	𳐖	𳐗	𳐘	𳐙	𳐚	𳐛	𳐜	𳐝	𳐞	𳐟
U+3342x	𳐠	𳐡	𳐢	𳐣	𳐤	𳐥	𳐦	𳐧	𳐨	𳐩	𳐪	𳐫	𳐬	𳐭	𳐮	𳐯
U+3343x	𳐰	𳐱	𳐲	𳐳	𳐴	𳐵	𳐶	𳐷	𳐸	𳐹	𳐺	𳐻	𳐼	𳐽	𳐾	𳐿
U+3344x	𳑀	𳑁	𳑂	𳑃	𳑄	𳑅	𳑆	𳑇	𳑈	𳑉	𳑊	𳑋	𳑌	𳑍	𳑎	𳑏
U+3345x	𳑐	𳑑	𳑒	𳑓	𳑔	𳑕	𳑖	𳑗	𳑘	𳑙	𳑚	𳑛	𳑜	𳑝	𳑞	𳑟
U+3346x	𳑠	𳑡	𳑢	𳑣	𳑤	𳑥	𳑦	𳑧	𳑨	𳑩	𳑪	𳑫	𳑬	𳑭	𳑮	𳑯
U+3347x	𳑰	𳑱	𳑲	𳑳	𳑴	𳑵	𳑶	𳑷	𳑸	𳑹						
Notes: 1. As of Unicode version 17.0; 2. Grey areas indicate non-assigned code points

== History ==
The following Unicode-related documents record the purpose and process of defining specific characters in the CJK Unified Ideographs Extension J block:

Version	Final code points (Note: Proposed code points and characters names may differ from final code points and names)	Count	L2 ID	WG2 ID	IRG ID	Document
17.0	U+323B0..33479	4,298		N5257R	N2678R2	Proposal on new CJK Unified Ideographs Extension for IRG WS2021, 2024-06-26
17.0	U+323B0..33479	4,298	L2/24-138	N5254		"Recommendation M71.14", Recommendations from WG 2 meeting 71, 2024-06-14
17.0	U+323B0..33479	4,298	L2/24-165			Lunde, Ken (2024-07-11), "07", CJK & Unihan Working Group Recommendations for UTC #180 Meeting
17.0	U+323B0..33479	4,298			N2707	CJK Unified Ideographs Extension J code chart (DRAFT; 4,300 ideographs: 323B0..3347B), 2024-07-14
17.0	U+323B0..33479	4,298	L2/24-159			Constable, Peter (2024-07-29), "Consensus 180-C1", UTC #180 Minutes, "Accept 4,300 CJK Unified Ideographs"
17.0	U+323B0..33479	4,298			N2723	Bai, Yi (2024-09-23), Issues about one unification case in Working Set 2021
17.0	U+323B0..33479	4,298			N2724	TCA's Response to IRGN2723, 2024-10-01
17.0	U+323B0..33479	4,298			N2702	Lunde, Ken (2024-10-24), "Recommendation IRG M63.11", IRG Meeting #63 Recommendations and Action Items
17.0	U+323B0..33479	4,298			N2704	"1. Disunifications and unifications", Editorial Report on Miscellaneous Issues, 2024-10-24
17.0	U+323B0..33479	4,298		N5289		Yang, Tao (2024-11-04), Proposal to remove 2 characters from Extension J
17.0	U+323B0..33479	4,298	L2/25-090			Lunde, Ken (2025-04-11), "32 [Affects U+32EBE]", CJK & Unihan Working Group Recommendations for UTC Meeting #183
