= Ken Lunde =

American specialist in East Asian ideographs (born 1965)

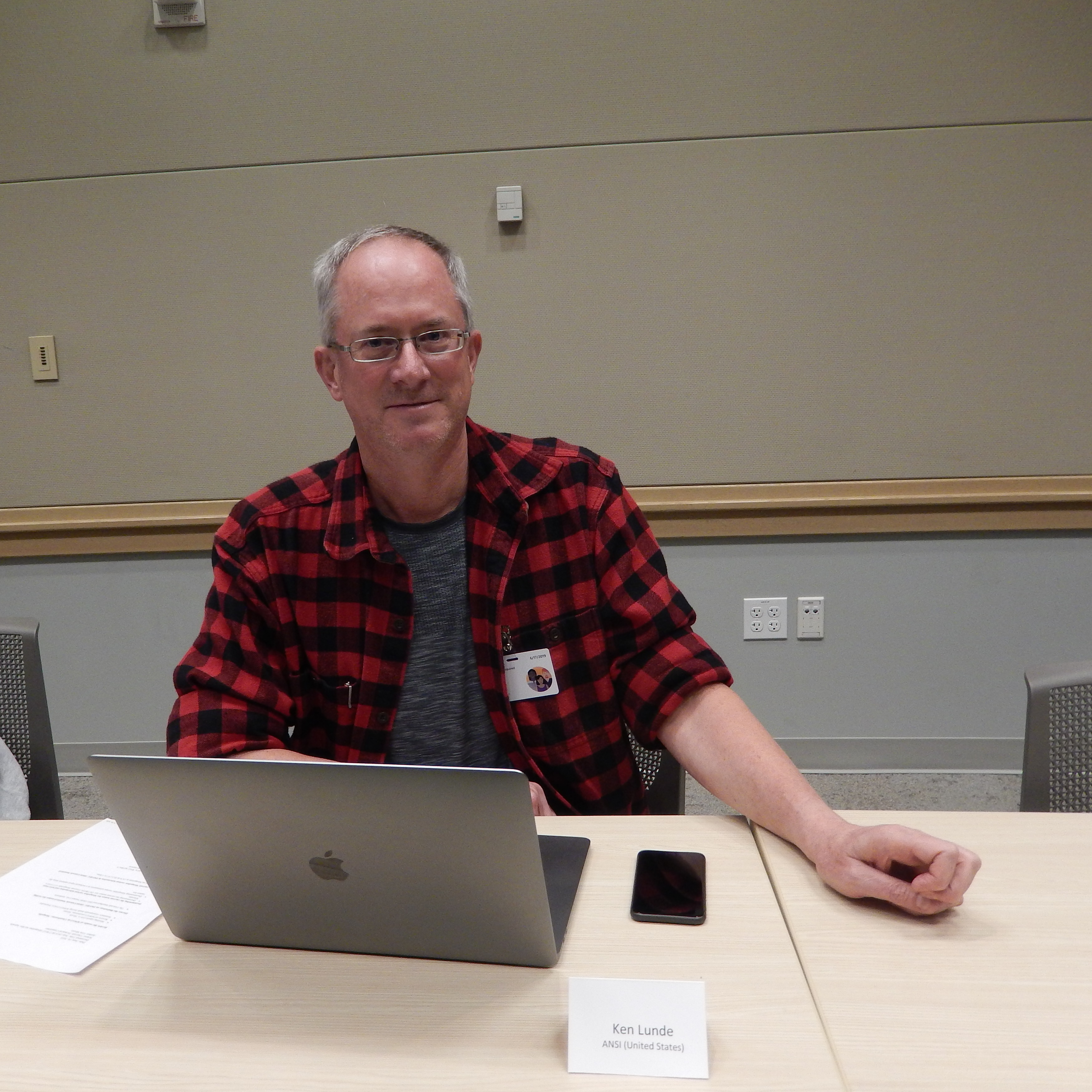
- Ken Lunde at ISO/IEC JTC1/SC2/WG2 Meeting 68 in Redmond, Washington, USA in June 2019
- Born: 12 August 1965 (age 61); Madison, Wisconsin, United States
- Education: University of Wisconsin–Madison (Ph.D., M.A., B.A.)

Ken Roger Lunde (/ˈlʌndi/, born 12 August 1965 in Madison, Wisconsin) is an American specialist in information processing for East Asian languages.

== Academic Background ==
Lunde majored in linguistics at University of Wisconsin–Madison in 1985, where he obtained his Bachelor of Arts degree in 1987, Master of Arts degree in 1988, and graduated with a doctoral thesis on the simplification of Japanese characters in 1994, titled "Prescriptive Kanji Simplification", which was written under the supervision of Professor Andrew Sihler.

== Career ==
Prior to graduation, he joined Adobe Systems on July 1, 1991, where he worked on font development and programming for information processing in CJKV languages; as of 2008, he worked there as a Senior Computer Scientist. He wrote two books on these topics, listed below under Bibliography. A second edition of CJKV Information Processing was published at the end of 2008. His 28-year-long career with Adobe ended on October 18, 2019.

He is a contributor to the Unicode Consortium –formerly as a representative of Adobe (a voting member there)–, specializing in CJK Unified Ideographs; he is the editor (or co-editor) of the Unicode Standard’s Standard Annex #11 “East Asian Width”, Technical Standard #37 “Unicode Ideographic Variation Database”, Standard Annex #38 “Unicode Han Database (Unihan)”, and Standard Annex #50 “Unicode Vertical Text Layout”.

He is also a Unicode representative (as a United States liaison body) at the Ideographic Rapporteur Group, a subgroup of the ISO/IEC JTC 1/SC 2 working group WG2 specializing in Han unification efforts.

In September 2018, Lunde was awarded the Bulldog Award at Internationalization & Unicode Conference 42.

Since 2018 Lunde has been a technical director of the Unicode Consortium and a vice-chair of the Unicode Emoji Subcommittee. He is also chair of the CJK & Unihan Working Group under the Unicode Technical Committee.

Since June 2024, Lunde has been convenor of the Ideographic Research Group, the body responsible for preparing and reviewing submissions of CJK unified ideographs for inclusion in the ISO/IEC 10646 and Unicode standards.

== Penname ==
Ken Lunde chose the penname “Ken Kobayashi” (Japanese: 小林剣; rōmaji: kobayashi ken) in 1985, a combination of gikun (義訓, reading of a kanji by meaning) and ateji (当て字, kanji used as phonetic symbol regardless of meaning) concepts. The surname Lunde, of Viking origin, shares the same meaning (“small woods” or “grove”) conveyed by the Japanese surname 小林; the given name 剣 (and its variant forms like 劍 in Japan's national standard JIS X 0208:1997), chosen both for its phonemic value and for its meaning (“sword”), conveys his fondness for sharp-edged tools like knives.

The traditional form 小林劍󠄁, where 劍󠄁 is actually an ideographic variant coined by his wife Hitomi Kudo (Japanese: 工藤仁美) and accessed with variation selector VS18 as <U+528D,U+E0101> (Adobe-Japan1-4 CID+14106), is penned in UAX #11, UTS #37, UAX #38, and UAX #50; the form 小林劍 (without the variation selector, matching Traditional Chinese form) was previously used in UAX #38 for Unicode versions 11.0 and earlier. The Japanese simplified form 小林剣 is currently used in his Adobe business card; he suggested in his 2008 book about using the Simplified Chinese form 小林剑 when visiting China.

== Bibliography ==
- Lunde, Ken Roger (December 2008). CJKV Information Processing (2 ed.). O'Reilly. ISBN 978-0-596-51447-1.
- Lunde, Ken Roger (December 1998). CJKV Information Processing (1 ed.). O'Reilly. ISBN 978-1-56592-224-2. (NB. Translated into Japanese and Chinese in 2002.)
- Lunde, Ken Roger (September 1993). Understanding Japanese Information Processing. O'Reilly. ISBN 978-1-56592-043-9. (translated into Japanese in 1995)
