= St. Paul's College, Macau =

Former university

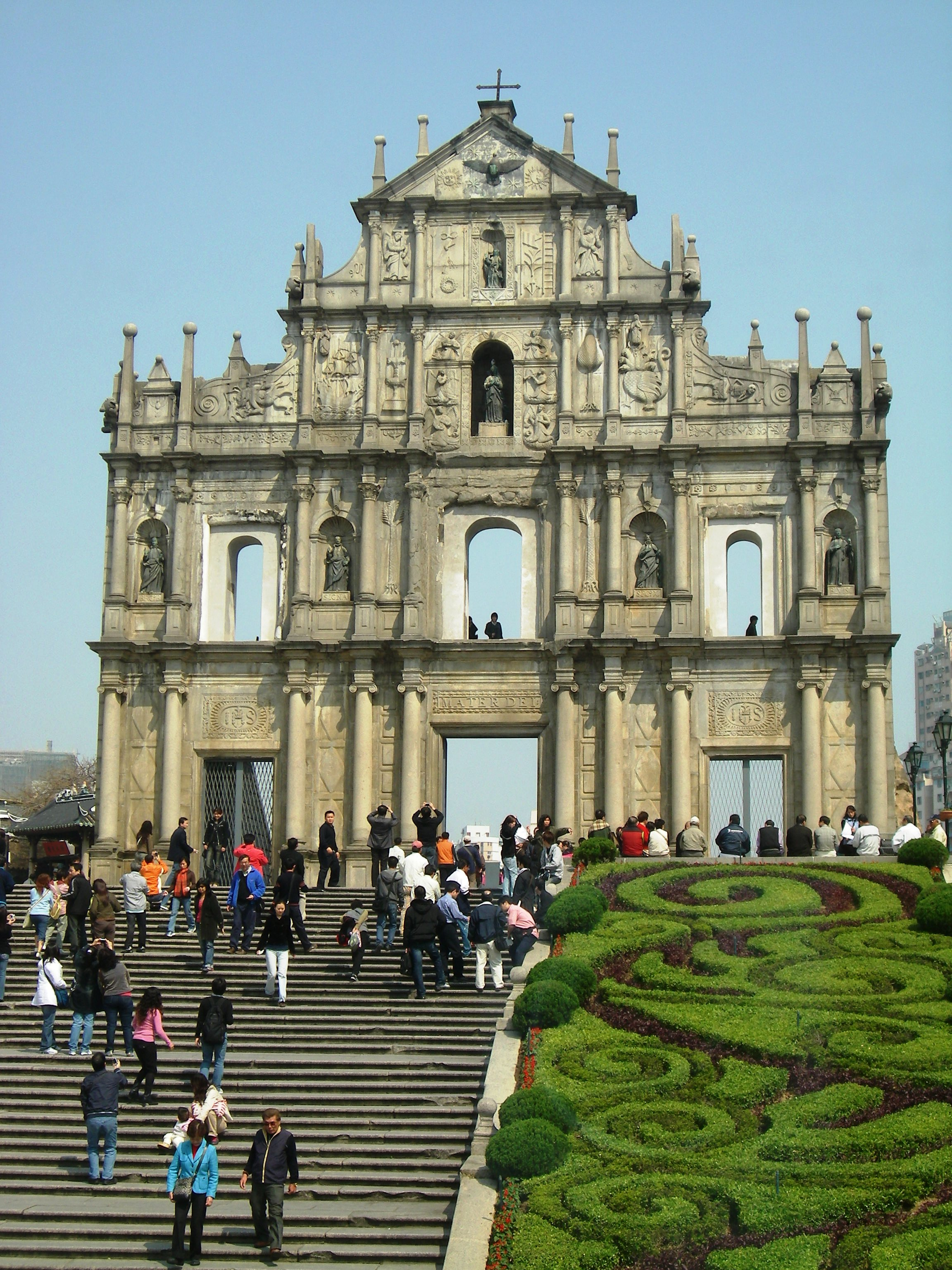
- Ruins of St. Paul's, showing the remaining facade of the Madre de Deus church
- Former names: Madre de Deus School
- Type: Private Roman Catholic research non-profit all-male Higher education institution
- Active: 1594–1762
- Founders: Fr. Alessandro Valignano, SJ
- Religious affiliation: Roman Catholic (Jesuit)
- Location: Santo António, Macau, China

St. Paul's College, Macau

Chinese name
- Traditional Chinese: 聖保祿學院
- Simplified Chinese: 圣保禄学院
Transcriptions
Standard Mandarin
- Hanyu Pinyin: Shèng Bǎolù Xuéyuàn

Portuguese name
- Portuguese: Colégio de São Paulo

St. Paul's College of Macau (Portuguese: Colégio de São Paulo; Chinese: 聖保祿學院), also known as College of Madre de Deus (Mater Dei in Latin), was a university founded in 1594 in Macau by Jesuits at the service of the Portuguese under the Padroado treaty. It claimed the title of the first Western university in East Asia.

St. Paul's College was founded by Alessandro Valignano in 1594 by upgrading the previous Madre de Deus School, as a stopover to prepare Jesuit missionaries traveling east. Its academic program came to include core disciplines such as theology, philosophy, and mathematics, geography, astronomy, and Latin, Portuguese and Chinese, including also a school of music and arts. It had immense influence on the learning of Eastern languages and culture, housing the first western sinologists Matteo Ricci, Johann Adam Schall von Bell and Ferdinand Verbiest, among many famous scholars of the time.

The College was the base for Jesuit missionaries travelling to China, Japan and East Asia, and its activity coincided with a thrifty Macau-Nagasaki trade until 1645. After a revolt blamed on religious influence, Japan expelled the Portuguese and banned Catholicism, and the college became then a shelter for fleeing Christian priests. Part of its teaching was transferred to the Seminário de São Jose in 1728 where the teaching of theology, philosophy and religious studies continues to this day (after a 28-year break between 1968 & 1996) as part on University of Saint Joseph's Faculty of Religious Studies and Philosophy. In 1996 the formation of IIUM (renamed the University of Saint Joseph in 2006) marked the formal resumption of a 400-year tradition.

Jesuits abandoned the site in 1762 when they were expelled by the Portuguese authorities, during the suppression of the Society of Jesus. The buildings were destroyed in a fire in 1835. In 2005, the ruins of St. Paul's – notably the facade of the Madre de Deus Church – were officially enlisted as part of the UNESCO World Heritage Site – Historic Centre of Macau.

== History ==
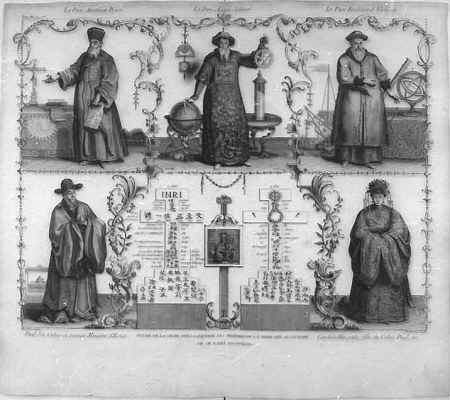
Represented (top): Matteo Ricci, Adam Schall von Bell, Ferdinand Verbiest Bottom: Paul Siu, colao or Prime Minister of State; Candide Hiu, granddaughter of Colao Paul Siu.

Since 1557, Portuguese Macau had been the single center for exchange between China and Japan, and from there to Europe via Goa. In 1571 Nagasaki was opened for Portuguese ships, after an agreement with daimyō Ōmura Sumitada who converted to Catholicism, and a flourishing trade established between the two cities, that would become known as "Nanban trade period".

Missionary activities in Japan had begun in 1549, when Jesuit co-founder Francis Xavier was received in a friendly manner and permitted to preach. Jesuits established congregations in Hirado, Yamaguchi and Bungo (by 1579 there were about 130,000 converts) and many daimyōs converted to Christianity, some to gain access to trade and arms. An attempt to reach China was made in 1552 by Francis Xavier, after being sought to talk to the Chinese Emperor in the favor of Portuguese being held prisoners in Guangzhou, but he died off mainland China, at Shangchuan Island: although Macau had been granted to Portuguese, contacts with continental China were always cautious and, starting in 1517, several Portuguese embassies were stalled while trying.

In 1572, the school which later developed into St. Paul's college was founded. This school offered local children instruction in Portuguese, Latin, arithmetic, and singing.

In 1576 Pope Gregory XIII included Japan in the Portuguese diocese of Macau. In September 1578 Alessandro Valignano arrived at Macau as a visitor of Jesuit Missions in the Indies, to examine and when necessary reorganize, answering to the Jesuit Superior in Rome. No missions had succeeded in establishing in mainland China, while in Japan they multiplied. Language study had always been one of the core problems: in his view, it was necessary first to learn to speak, read, and write the Chinese language. To this end, he wrote to the Superior in India, who sent to Macau Jesuit scholar Michele Ruggieri (羅明堅) who called the help of Matteo Ricci (利瑪竇), to share the work. Ricci joined him in Macau in 1582. and together, they become the first European scholars of China and the Chinese language.

In 1579 Valignano made his first visit to Japan. Before the Visitor arrived, seventeen of Valignano's personally appointed missionaries wrote to him complaining that language training was totally nonexistent. Lacking fluency in the Japanese language, Francis Xavier had limited to reading aloud a Japanese translation of a catechism, however Jesuits established several congregations. In 1563 Oda Nobunaga favored Jesuit missionary Luís Fróis, and generally tolerated Christianity. It was Valignano's first official act upon arriving in Japan that all new missionaries in the province spend two years in a language course, separating these newcomers by leaps and bounds from the first enthusiastic but stilted efforts of Francis Xavier.

On 9 June 1580, Ōmura Sumitada ceded jurisdiction over Nagasaki and Mogi to the Society of Jesus. On August 25, the armies of Philip II of Spain won the Battle of Alcântara, claiming the throne of Portugal and accomplishing the union of the empires so feared in Macau and Nagasaki, as it threatened the Chinese permission to stay in Macau, and challenged their carefully built trade monopoly as it opened to the Spanish based in the Philippines. In 1582, from Japan, Valignano sent an embassy to the Pope and the kings of Europe sponsored by Kirishitan daimyos Sumitada, Ōtomo Sōrin and Arima Harunobu, whom he accompanied via Macau to Goa. In 1583, the Portuguese in Macau were permitted to form a Senate and kept sovereignty. Macau prospered, and Jesuits engaged in the trade. This breach of ecclesiastical practice did not go unnoticed by other European missions in the area, or by those living via inter-Asiatic trade. Eventually, the Pope was forced to intervene, and, in 1585, ordered an immediate cessation of all mercantile activities by the Society. Valignano made an impassioned appeal to the Pope, as Jesuits needed the funds for their many enterprises.

Valignano sought to establish a program in Macau for the training of Japanese Jesuits (i.e., a place where they would be safe from the Japanese persecutions of Catholics). He first proposed this plan in 1592 at a General Consultation of Missionaries in Nagasaki.

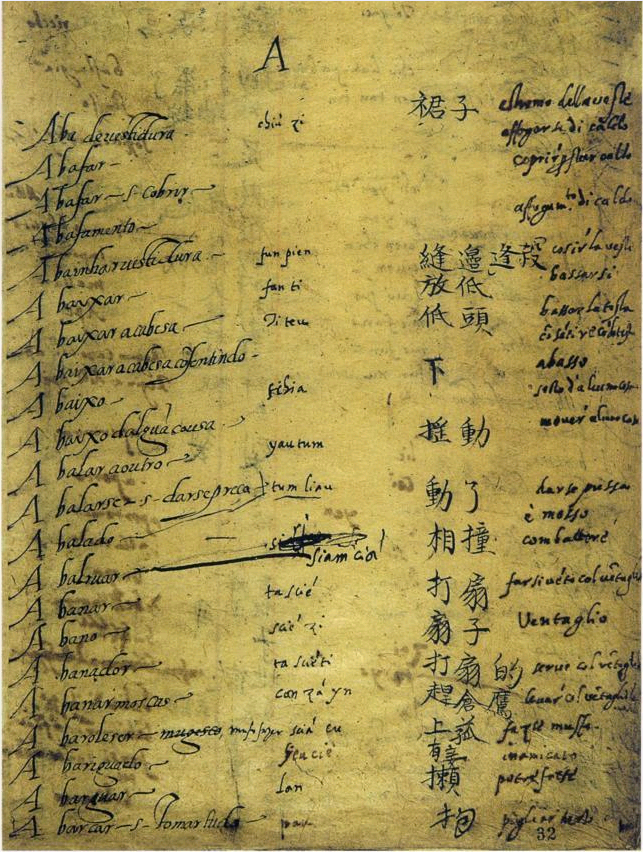
A page from the manuscript Portuguese-Chinese dictionary created by Ruggieri, Ricci, and Fernandez (between 1583–88)

In 1594 St. Paul's College of Macau was authorized by the Jesuit superior in Rome, by upgrading the previous Madre de Deus school. At first, the college included two seminaries for lay brothers, a university with faculties of arts, philosophy and theology, a primary school and a school of music and arts. By 1595 Valignano could boast in a letter that not only had the Jesuits printed a Japanese grammar (see Arte da Lingoa de Iapam) and dictionary (see Vocabvlario da Lingoa de Iapam (Nippo Jisho)), published in a printing press established in Nagasaki, but also several books (mostly the lives of saints and martyrs) entirely in Japanese. The main body of the grammar and dictionary was compiled from 1590–1603; when finished, it was a truly comprehensive volume with the dictionary alone containing some 32,798 entries.

Between 1597 and 1762 it had immense influence on the learning of Eastern languages and culture by missionary Jesuits, making Macau a base for the spreading of Christianity in China and in Japan. Its academic program soon became comprehensive and equivalent to that of a university: it included core disciplines such as theology, philosophy, and mathematics, geography, astronomy, and Latin, Portuguese and Chinese. Many famous scholars taught and learned at this college, which became home to the first western sinologists such as Matteo Ricci, Johann Adam Schall von Bell and Ferdinand Verbiest.

Macau was thus the training ground for missions in Asia. From 1597 until 1762, Jesuit priests entering into China would always come first to Macau where, at St. Paul’s College, they would learn to speak Chinese together with other areas of Chinese knowledge, including philosophy and comparative religion, gathering a body of knowledge that would lead to the Jesuit position in defense of the adoption of local practices in the Chinese Rites controversy. It was the largest seminary in East Asia at the time and the first Western-style university in the region.

In 1721, the Chinese emperor banned the activities of the Jesuits in China and his successor more generally prohibited Christian practice in 1724. Jesuits leaving China gathered in Macau and at St. Paul's. Beginning in 1759, Portugal began suppressing the Jesuits under the direction of the kingdom's chief minister, Sebastião José de Carvalho e Melo, and in 1762 the Jesuits were also expelled from Macau.

St. Paul's was destroyed in a fire in 1835.

== Notable scholars ==
- Alessandro Valignano (1578) 1594 founder of the college, promoter of Japanese language and Chinese language studies.
- Michele Ruggieri (1579) co-author of the Portuguese-Chinese dictionary – the first ever European-Chinese dictionary
- Matteo Ricci (1582) co-author of the Portuguese-Chinese dictionary – the first ever European-Chinese dictionary
- João Rodrigues (c. 1574–77 and c. 1610–33) organizer of the first ever European(Portuguese)-Japanese dictionary, the Nippo Jisho.
- Johann Adam Schall von Bell (1619) counsellor of the Shunzhi Emperor, Director of the Imperial Observatory and the Tribunal of Mathematics.
- Alexander de Rhodes (1630–1640) author of the first Vietnamese-Portuguese-Latin dictionary, published in Rome in 1651.
- Michał Boym (1643) Teacher at the College, author of numerous works on Asian fauna, flora and geography
- Ferdinand Verbiest (1659) mathematician and astronomer, corrected the Chinese calendar, was Head of the Mathematical Board and Director of the Observatory.
- Thomas Pereira (c. 1665–73) considered the introducer of Western music in China, emissary of Kangxi Emperor managed to secure the Treaty of Nerchinsk
- Wenceslas Pantaleon Kirwitzer
- Manuel Dias (Yang MaNuo)
- Martino Martini
- Giulio Alenio
- Xu Guangqi
- Wu Li
- Petro Kasui Kibe

== See also ==
- Jesuit China missions
- Padroado
- Saint Paul's College, Goa
- List of Jesuit sites
