= João Rodrigues Tçuzu =

Portuguese missionary (1561 or 1562 – 1633 or 1634)

João Rodrigues
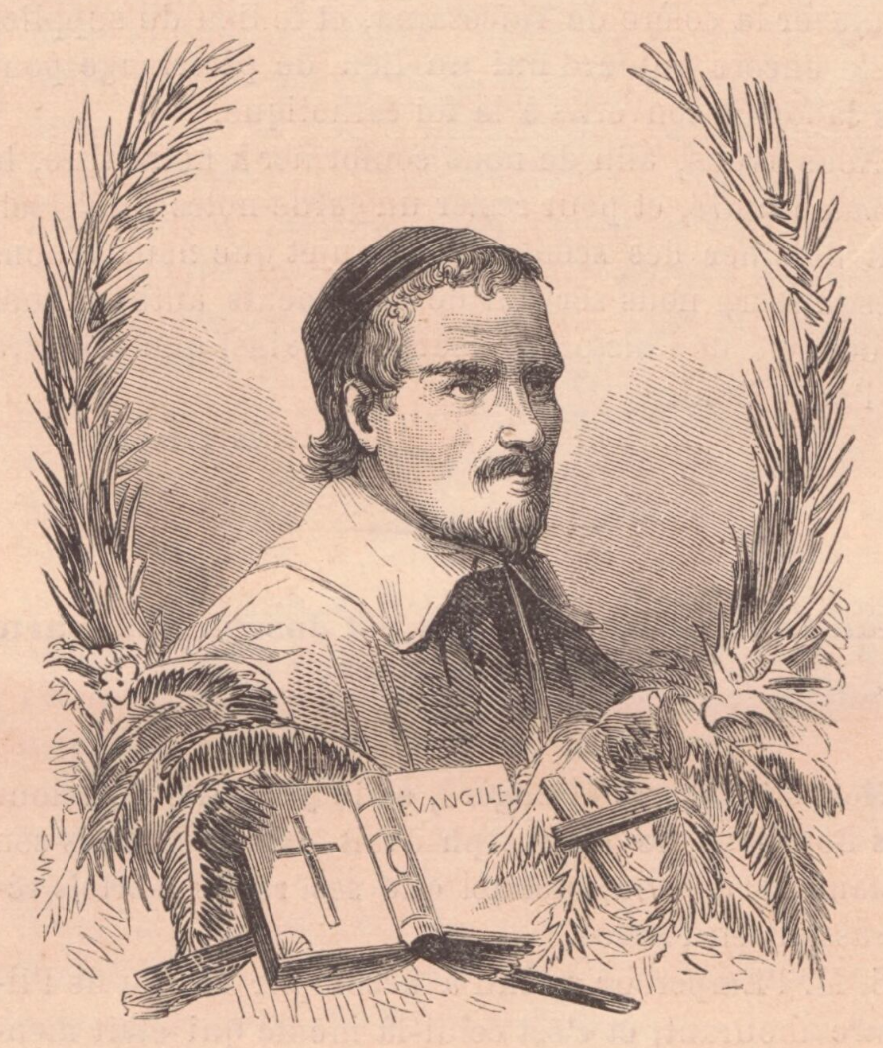
- Father J. Rodriguez, Jesuit martyr (Le Monde Illustré, 1862)
- Born: 1561 or 1562; Sernancelhe, Portugal
- Died: 1633 or 1634; Macao, Portuguese Empire (China)
- Occupations: Linguist, interpreter and missionary
- Known for: early linguistic works on Japanese; introducing Western science and culture to Korea

João Rodrigues

Chinese name
- Traditional Chinese: 陸若漢
- Simplified Chinese: 陆若汉
Transcriptions
Standard Mandarin
- Hanyu Pinyin: Lù Ruòhàn; Lù Rěhàn
- Wade–Giles: Lu Jo-han; Lu Jê-han
Yue: Cantonese
- Jyutping: Luk⁶ Joek⁶-hon³; Luk⁶ Je⁵-hon³

Korean name
- Hangul: 육약한
Transcriptions
- Revised Romanization: Yuk Yakhan
- McCune–Reischauer: Yuk Yakhan

João Rodrigues (1561 or 1562 – 1633 or 1634), distinguished as Tçuzu and also known by other names in China and Korea, was a Portuguese sailor, warrior, and Jesuit interpreter, missionary, priest, and scholar in Japan and China.

He is now best known for his linguistic works on the Japanese language, including The Art of the Japanese Language. He collaborated with the Society of Jesus in Japan to compile the work, and he is widely regarded as the principal compiler of the Nippo Jisho, the first Japanese–Portuguese dictionary, published in 1603.

== Name ==
João Rodrigues's epithet "Tçuzu" was an early Portuguese transcription of his Japanese descriptor Tsūji (Japanese: 通事, "the Interpreter"). It distinguished him from a contemporary João Rodrigues in the Jesuits' China mission. João's surname sometimes appears in its Spanish form Rodriguez, the form he himself used in his Portuguese works; his epithet is sometimes mistakenly written as Tçuzzu.

In Japan and China, Rodrigues used the Chinese name Lu Ruohan (陸若漢), abbreviating his family name to a single character Lu in the Chinese style and transcribing his given name's Latin form Iohannes to Ruohan. In modern Korean sources, Rodrigues's name is written with the pronunciation Yuk Yakhan (육약한), although at the time his Chinese surname would have been pronounced Ryuk (륙). In 19th- and early 20th-century sources, his name appears as "Jean Niouk", a blend of the French form of his given name and Dallet's French transcription of the Korean pronunciation of the Chinese form of his surname.

== Life ==
=== In Japan ===
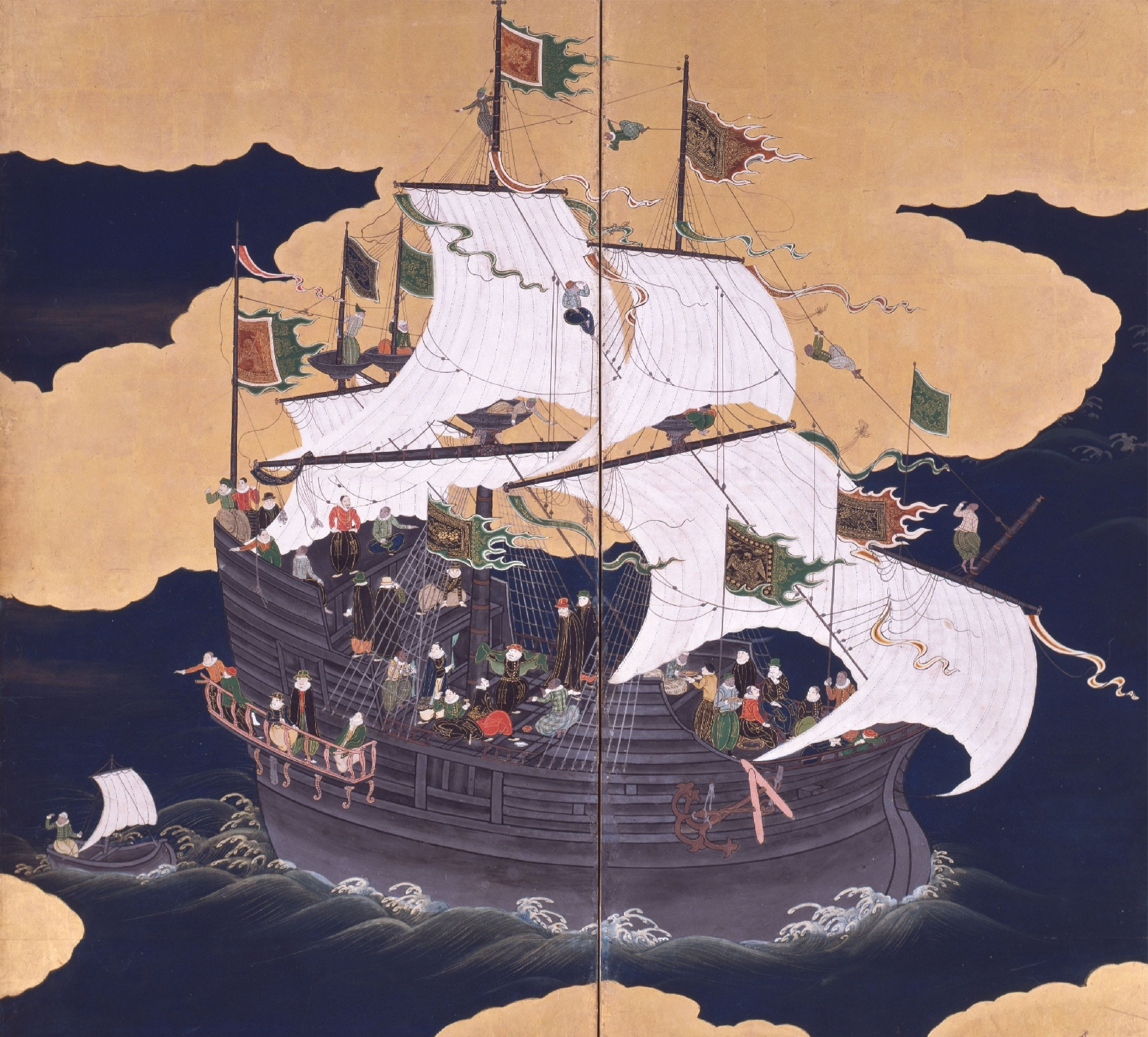
A 16th- or 17th-century Japanese screen print of a Portuguese Black Ship engaged in the Nanban Trade.

Rodrigues was born at Sernancelhe in Viseu, Portugal, in 1561 or 1562. (Note: Sources that place his birth in Alcochete have confused him with his contemporary missionary João Rodrigues Girão.) He sailed to Asia in his early teens and reached Japan by 1577. (Note: A 1619 report by Francisco Vieira states that Rodrigues came to Japan in 1577 as "a child"; other sources place him in Ōtomo's service by 1576.) Ōtomo Yoshishige, daimyō of Funai ("Bungo"), had long maintained a friendly relationship with the Portuguese and Spanish against the strong resistance of his wife and counselors; at some point, Rodrigues joined his campaigns against other clans competing for control of Kyushu.

Ōtomo divorced his Shinto-priestess wife and converted to Catholicism in 1578. In December 1580, around age 19, Rodrigues joined the Jesuit novitiate at Ōita ("Funai"). At the time, the Society of Jesus reckoned a Christian community in Japan of about 100,000 converts.

Despite having an admittedly unpolished style in Portuguese, he knew Spanish and taught grammar while he studied Latin and theology under the Jesuits and Japanese literature and philosophy with others. He was soon recognized for his fluent Japanese, and his knowledge of Han script also allowed him to translate documents written in Chinese. (From examples and comparisons in his works, he also seems to have had some knowledge of Italian and one of the Indian languages around Goa, possibly a dialect of Konkani or Tamil.) He served as interpreter for Alessandro Valignano during his visit and for Vice-Provincial Gaspar Coelho (1581–1590). He began to preach in Japanese in 1588, despite still being unordained. During Valignano's visit to Toyotomi Hideyoshi in July 1590, Rodrigues so impressed Toyotomi that the regent hired him for a time as his personal interpreter. He was procurator of the Jesuits' Japan mission from 1591 to 1626.

Rodrigues finished his theological studies at Nagasaki in 1593 and was ordained as a priest at Macao the next year, returning to Japan in 1596. On 16 September 1598, Rodrigues visited the dying Hideyoshi and tried unsuccessfully to convert him to Christianity. He remained well-liked and influential under the new shōgun Tokugawa Ieyasu, protecting Jesuit missions and Japanese converts at Nagasaki, Osaka, and Kyoto. Native courtiers tried to remove him on several occasions and even Tokugawa tested his honesty on a few occasions before admitting his suspicions were ill-founded. Following a violent suppression of marauding Japanese sailors in Macao in 1608 and court intrigues the next year, however, Tokugawa resolved to replace Portuguese traders with red seal ships, the Dutch, and the Spanish in early 1610. After a successful assault on a Portuguese ship then in Nagasaki Bay, he permitted most of the missionaries to remain but replaced Rodrigues with the Englishman William Adams. In 1614, he was finally compelled to leave Japan altogether, having lived there for over thirty years.

=== In China ===
Rodrigues returned to Macao and then began work with the China mission. He first worked at Zhenjiang near Nanjing and then traveled the interior of the country looking for antiquities related to the medieval Church of the East. He participated in the Chinese Rites Controversy, where he opposed Matteo Ricci's attempts to permit most traditional Chinese rituals within a Christian context.

During the Manchu invasion of Ming China, Rodrigues came to Beijing in 1623 as the interpreter for the Portuguese company charged with demonstrating European firearms. During one demonstration, the cannon exploded, killing a Portuguese artillerist and three Chinese, prompting Rodrigues and the rest to return to Macao. There he worked as the Japan procurador, the priest in charge of the Macao–Japan trade, until 1627.

Following memorials by the converts Paul Xu and Leo Li in 1629, Rodrigues—now 68—served as the interpreter for a second expedition under Gonçalo Teixeira-Correa intended for Beijing. The group was permitted to bring ten artillery pieces and four "excellent bombards" through China to the capital. They reached Zhuozhou on 5 January 1630, but were first delayed from reaching the capital and then quickly sent from it to Dengzhou (now Penglai) in Shandong, where they trained troops under its Christian governor Ignatius Sun in the use of modern cannon. While there in early 1631, Sun and Rodrigues were visited by Jeong Duwon, a Korean mandarin traveling with a diplomatic mission from Seoul to Beijing. (Note: This meeting is sometimes erroneously reported as having occurred in Beijing or Nanjing.) Rodrigues introduced him to the Jesuits' work on astronomy and other sciences and made a personal gift of his telescope, which Jeong highly praised for its use in warfare. He also provided Jeong with a small fieldgun, a treatise on cannon and their use, and a book on European customs and manners. Jeong also had Rodrigues speak with his assistants Yi Yeonghu (이영후, 李栄後) and Colonel Jeong Hyogil (정효길, 鄭孝吉) in greater detail, Yi about geography and Col. Jeong about Western firearms and cannon. A record survives of his conversation with Yi, who was most curious about whether or not China—whose native name Zhōngguó (中國) literally means "The Central Realm"—did in fact occupy the middle of the earth. Rodrigues replied that, since the earth was a sphere, every country could truthfully claim their land as its center.

On 19 January 1632, Governor Sun's subordinates Kong Youde and Geng Zhongming mutinied in Wuqiao. Rather than immediately attacking them, Sun attempted to negotiate a peaceful resolution of their differences. This proved futile and, on 11 February, their forces besieged Dengzhou. When the city fell a little over a week later, Sun was spared by Kong and Geng for his leniency but, for the same reason, he was then arrested, court-martialed, and executed by the Ming government. Captain Teixeira and 11 other Portuguese were killed in battle, 15 escaped only with serious injury, and Rodrigues himself survived by jumping from the high city wall into the sea. He then made his way back to Beijing, where he received an imperial decree praising his services.

Rodrigues returned to Macao in 1633 and died there at some point before a letter to Rome mentioning his death, dated 20 March 1634. Francesco Sambiasi's 1639 memorial to the throne responsible for the first Catholic graveyard at Macao's São Paulo church mentions Rodrigues's remains prominently, although after the plot was approved for the church's use Rodrigues's body was instead interred within the church itself in front of its St Michael altar.

== Works ==
=== The Art of the Japanese Language ===
The Art of the Japanese Language

The Art of the Japanese Language (Portuguese: Arte da Lingoa de Iapam) was published at Nagasaki in three volumes from 1604 to 1608. In addition to vocabulary and grammar, it includes details on the country's dynasties, currency, measures, and other commercial information. Although it was preceded by some manuscript glossaries and grammars, such as those given to the Philippine Jesuits who settled at Kyoto in 1593, it was apparently the first printed Japanese grammar. A manuscript edition is in the Vatican Library; the two surviving copies of the printed version are in Oxford's Bodleian Library and the private collection of the Earl of Crawford. It was translated into Japanese by Tadao Doi (土井忠生) in 1955.

==== The Short Art of the Japanese Language ====
The Short Art of the Japanese Language (Arte Breve da Lingoa Iapoa), distinguishing the earlier grammar as the Great Art (Arte Grande), was published on Macao in 1620. It does not merely abridge the earlier work but reformulates its treatment of grammar, establishing clear and concise rules regarding the principal features of the Japanese language. There is a manuscript edition in the French National Library; the two surviving printed editions are in the Ajuda Library in Lisbon and the library of the School of Oriental and African Studies in London. It was translated into French by M.C. Landresse as Elements of Japanese Grammar (Elémens de la Grammaire Japonaise) in 1825, with a supplement added the next year.

=== History of the Japanese Church ===
His History of the Japanese Church (Historia da Igreja do Japão) was a monumental attempt to complete the earlier unfinished works of Valignano and Luís Fróis but was itself incomplete. Despite the book's name, the details of the Jesuit efforts in Japan are largely relegated to an appendix entitled "Bishops of the Japanese Church" (Bispos da Igreja do Japao). The main text describes Japanese history and culture, including discussions of the Japanese language, Chinese characters, and writing styles. In Japan, Rodrigues witnessed the expansion of the Portuguese presence, the arrival of the first Englishman William Adams, and the consolidation of the Tokugawa Shogunate. During this period, he also wrote observations on Japanese life, including political events of the emergence of the shogunate and a detailed description of the tea ceremony. His writings reveal an open mind about the culture of his host country, including praise of the holiness of the Buddhist monks. The autograph manuscript is lost but a 1740 copy was discovered by the Jesuit J.M. Cros in the Ajuda Library around 1900. The first 181 pages of the manuscript were published in two volumes as Vol. XIII of the series Notices from Macao (Colecção: Noticias de Macau; 1953 & 1955) in Tokyo. It was translated into English by Michael Cooper in 2001.

He worked on two treatises—one concerning the Chinese Buddhist sects and their relation to those in Japan and another on the geography of China after the style of Ortelius's Theater of the World—that have only survived in manuscript fragments. His letter to Jeong Duwon on Western astronomy is also preserved; it was translated into Italian by d'Elia and English by Suter & al. In China, he also wrote a description of the 8th-century Xi'an Stele discovered at Xi'an in 1625 and a treatise opposing Matteo Ricci's translation of Christian concepts into Chinese. His Record of Gonçalo the Dutiful (公沙効忠紀, Gōngshā Xiàozhōng Jǐ) is a Chinese paean to the bravery of Capt. Teixeira at Dengzhou.

=== On the Japanese-Portuguese dictionary ===
He was also long supposed to have been the main compiler of the first Japanese–Portuguese dictionary, published in 1603, but this attribution was mistaken and Rodrigues's involvement with any aspect of its compilation has been debated. (Note: For a recent discussion concerning the compiler of the dictionary, see Zwartjes.)

== Legacy ==
The character of Martin Alvito in the James Clavell book Shōgun is loosely based on Rodrigues, while the protagonist is based on William Adams. In the 1980 miniseries adaptation he is portrayed by Damien Thomas and by Tommy Bastow in the 2024 adaptation. Clavell appears to have named the character Vasco Rodrigues to acknowledge João Rodrigues in a similar way as he gave Vasco Rodrigues's Japanese wife the name "Gracia" to honor Hosokawa Gracia. (In the book, the character "Mariko" is based on Hosokawa.)
