= Catholic missions =

Missionary work of the Catholic Church

Missionary work of the Catholic Church has often been undertaken outside the geographically defined parishes and dioceses by religious orders who have people and material resources to spare, and some of which specialized in missions. Eventually, parishes and dioceses would be organized worldwide, often after an intermediate phase as an apostolic prefecture or apostolic vicariate. Catholic mission has predominantly been carried out by the Latin Church in practice.

In the Roman Curia, missionary work is organised by the Dicastery for Evangelisation.

== Historical overview ==
=== Middle Ages ===
During the Middle Ages, Christian monasteries and missionaries (such as Saint Patrick and Adalbert of Prague) fostered formal education and learning of religion, beyond the boundaries of the old Roman Empire. In the seventh century, Gregory the Great sent missionaries, including Augustine of Canterbury, into England. The Hiberno-Scottish mission began in 563 CE.

In the late thirteenth and early fourteenth centuries, Franciscans (such as William of Rubruck, John of Montecorvino, and Giovanni ed' Magnolia) were sent as missionaries to the Near and Far East. Their travels took them as far as China, in an attempt to convert the advancing Mongols to Christianity, especially the Great Khans of the Mongol Empire. (See also Catholic Church in China.)

=== Age of Discovery ===
Beginning in the 1450s, Catholic missions were administered through patronage rights (jus patronatus).

During the Age of Discovery, the Catholic Church established a number of missions in the Americas and other colonies through the Augustinians, Franciscans, and Dominicans in order to spread Catholicism in the New World and to convert the indigenous peoples of the Americas and other indigenous people. At the same time, missionaries such as Francis Xavier as well as other Jesuits, Augustinians, Franciscans, and Dominicans were moving into Asia and the Far East. The Portuguese sent missions into Africa. These are some of the most well-known missions in history.

In the empires ruled by both Portugal and Spain, religion was an integral part of the state and evangelization was seen as having both secular and spiritual benefits. Wherever these powers attempted to expand their territories or influence, missionaries would soon follow. By the Treaty of Tordesillas, the two powers divided the world between them into exclusive spheres of influence, trade, and colonization. The Catholic world order was challenged by the Netherlands and England. Theoretically, it was repudiated by Grotius's Mare Liberum. Portugal's and Spain's colonial policies were also challenged by the Catholic Church itself. The Vatican founded the Congregatio de Propaganda Fide in 1622 and attempted to separate the churches from the influence of the Iberian kingdoms.

While missions in areas ruled by Spanish and Portuguese, and to a lesser extent, the French, are associated with cultural imperialism and oppression, and often operated under the sponsorship and consent of colonial governments, those in other portions of the world (notably Matteo Ricci's Jesuit mission to China, and the work of other Jesuit missionaries in the Nagasaki region in Japan) were focused on the conversion of individuals within existing social and political structures, and often operated without the consent of local government.

== History by region ==
=== India ===
==== Early missionaries ====
John of Monte Corvino was a Franciscan sent to China to become prelate of Peking in around 1307. He traveled from Persia and moved down by sea to India in 1291, to the Madras region or "Country of St. Thomas". There he preached for thirteen months and baptized about one hundred people. From there Monte Corvino wrote home, in December 1291 (or 1292), giving one of the earliest noteworthy accounts of the Coromandel coast furnished by any Western European. Traveling by sea from Mailapur, he reached China in 1294, appearing in the capital "Cambaliech" (now Beijing).

Friar Odoric of Pordenone arrived in India in 1321. He visited Malabar, touching at Pandarani (20 m. north of Calicut) at Cranganore and at Kulam or Quilon, proceeding thence, apparently, to Ceylon and to the shrine of St Thomas at Maylapur near Madras. He writes that he had found the place where Thomas was buried.

The French Dominican missionary Father Jordanus Catalani followed in 1321–22. He reported to Rome, apparently from somewhere on the west coast of India, that he had given Christian burial to four martyred monks. Jordanus is known for his 1329 Mirabilia describing the marvels of the East: he furnished the best account of Indian regions and the Christians, the products, climate, manners, customs, fauna and flori given by any European in the Middle Ages – superior even to Marco Polo's.

In 1347, Giovanni de Marignolli visited the shrine of St Thomas near the modern Madras, and then proceeded to what he calls the kingdom of Saba and identifies with the Sheba of Scripture, but which seems from various particulars to have been Java. Taking ship again for Malabar on his way to Europe, he encountered great storms.

Another prominent Indian traveler was Joseph, priest over Cranganore. He journeyed to Babylon in 1490 and then sailed to Europe and visited Portugal, Rome, and Venice before returning to India. He helped to write a book about his travels entitled The Travels of Joseph the Indian which was widely disseminated across Europe.

==== Arrival of the Portuguese ====
The introduction of Catholicism in India begins from the first decade of 1500, with the arrival of the Portuguese missionaries there. In the 16th century, the proselytization of Asia was linked to the Portuguese colonial policy. With the Papal bull Romanus Pontifex written on 8 January 1455 by Pope Nicholas V to King Afonso V of Portugal, the patronage for the propagation of the Christian faith (see "Padroado") in Asia was given to the Portuguese, who were rewarded with the right of conquest. The missionaries of the different orders (Franciscans, Dominicans, Jesuits, Augustinians, etc.) flocked out with the conquerors, and began at once to build churches along the coastal districts wherever the Portuguese power made itself felt.

The history of Portuguese missionaries in India starts with the neo-apostles who reached Kappad near Kozhikode on 20 May 1498 along with Vasco da Gama, which represented less than 2% of the total population and was the largest Christian church within India. He was seeking to form anti-Islamic alliances with pre-existing Christian nations. The lucrative spice trade attracted the Portuguese crown.

During the second expedition under Captain Pedro Álvares Cabral, the Portuguese fleet consisted of 13 ships and 18 priests anchored at Cochin on 26 November 1500. Cabral soon won the goodwill of the Raja of Cochin who allowed four priests to do apostolic work among the early Christian communities scattered in and around Cochin. Thus missionaries established a Portuguese mission in 1500. Dom Francisco de Almeida, the first Portuguese Viceroy, got permission from the Kochi Raja to build two church edifices – Santa Cruz Basilica (1505) and St. Francis Church (1506) using stones and mortar which were unheard of at that time, as local prejudices were against such a structure except for a royal palace or a temple.

In the beginning of the 16th century, the whole of the East was under the jurisdiction of the Archdiocese of Lisbon. On 12 June 1514, Cochin and Goa became two prominent mission stations under the newly created Diocese of Funchal in Madeira, in the Atlantic. In 1534 Pope Paul III by the Bull Quequem Reputamus raised Funchal to an archdiocese with Goa as its suffragan, placing the whole of India under the diocese of Goa. This created an episcopal see – suffragan to Funchal, with a jurisdiction extending potentially over all past and future conquests from the Cape of Good Hope to China.

The first converts to Christianity in Goa were native Goan women who married Portuguese men that arrived with Afonso de Albuquerque during the Portuguese conquest of Goa in 1510.

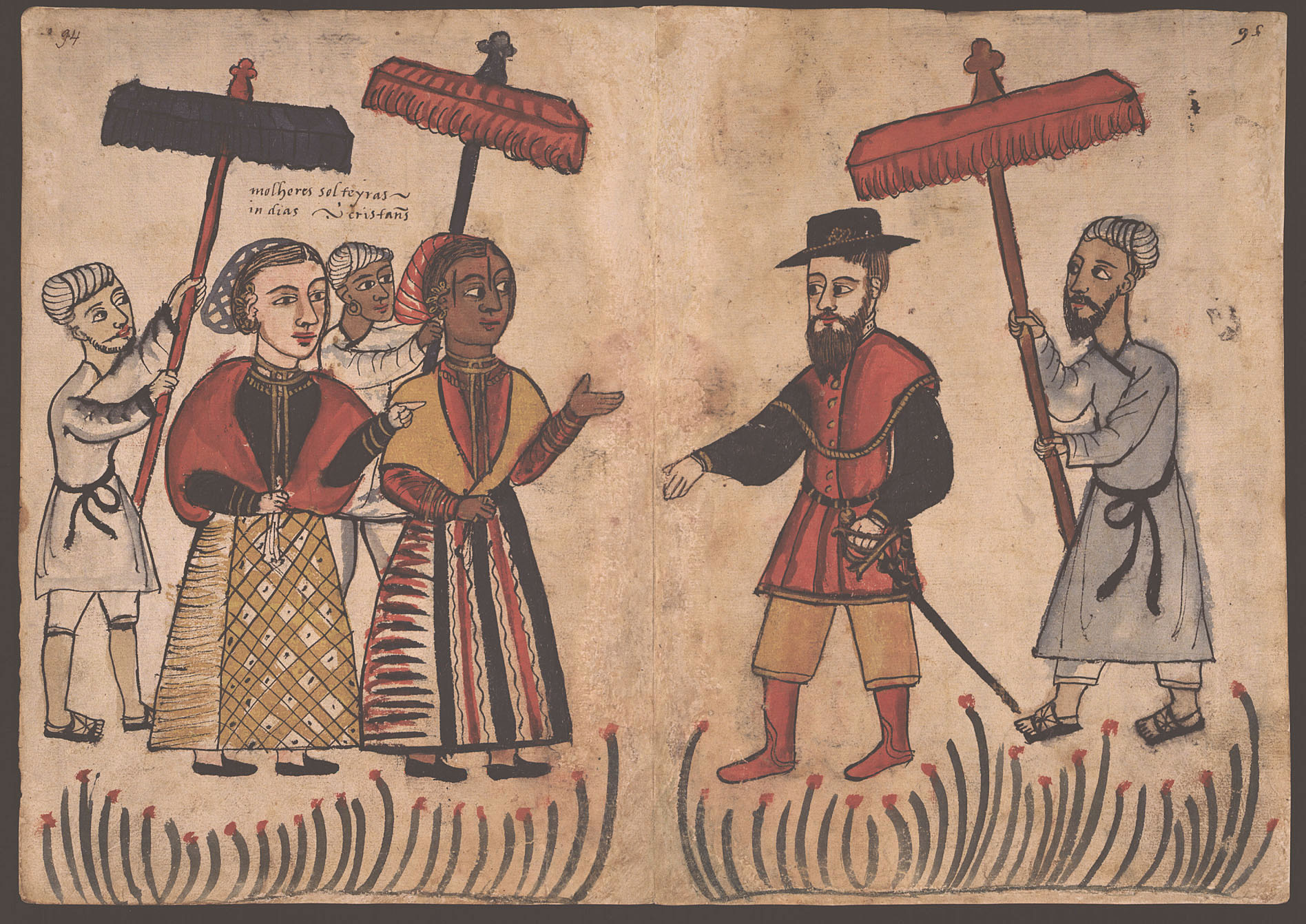
Christian maidens of Goa meeting a Portuguese nobleman seeking a wife, from the Códice Casanatense (c. 1540)

During the mid-16th century, the city of Goa, was the center of Christianization in the East. The Portuguese rulers implemented state policies encouraging and even rewarding conversions among Hindu subjects, it would be false to ascribe the large number of conversions to force. The rapid rise of converts in Goa was mostly the result of Portuguese economic and political control over the Hindus, who were vassals of the Portuguese crown. At the same time many New Christians from Portugal migrated to India as a result of the inquisition in Portugal. Many of them were suspected of being Crypto-Jews, converted Jews who were secretly practicing their old religion, and were considered a threat to the solidarity of Christian belief. Saint Francis Xavier, in a 1545 letter to John III of Portugal, requested the Goan Inquisition, but it was not set up until 1560.

In 1557 Goa was made an independent archbishopric, with suffragan sees at Cochin and Malacca. The whole of the East was under the jurisdiction of Goa and its boundaries extended to almost half of the world: from the Cape of Good Hope in South Africa, to Burma, China, and Japan in East Asia. In 1576 the suffragan See of Macao (China) was added, and in 1588 that of Funai in Japan.

In 1597 the death of the last metropolitan bishop, Archdeacon Abraham of the Saint Thomas Christians, an ancient body formerly part of the Church of the East gave the then Archbishop of Goa Menezes an opportunity to bring the native church under the authority of the Catholic Church. He was able to secure the submission of Archdeacon George, the highest remaining representative of the native church hierarchy. Menezes convened the Synod of Diamper between 20 and 26 June 1599, which introduced a number of reforms to the church and brought it fully into the Latin Church of the Catholic Church. Following the Synod, Menezes consecrated Jesuit Francis Ros as Archbishop of the Archdiocese of Angamalé for the Saint Thomas Christians – another suffragan see to Archdiocese of Goa – and Latinisation of St Thomas Christians started. Most eventually accepted the Catholic faith but some switched to West Syrian rite. The Saint Thomas Christians were pressured to acknowledge the authority of the Pope. Resentment of these measures led to some part of the community to join the Archdeacon Thomas in swearing never to submit to the Portuguese or to accept Communion with Rome, in the Coonan Cross Oath in 1653.

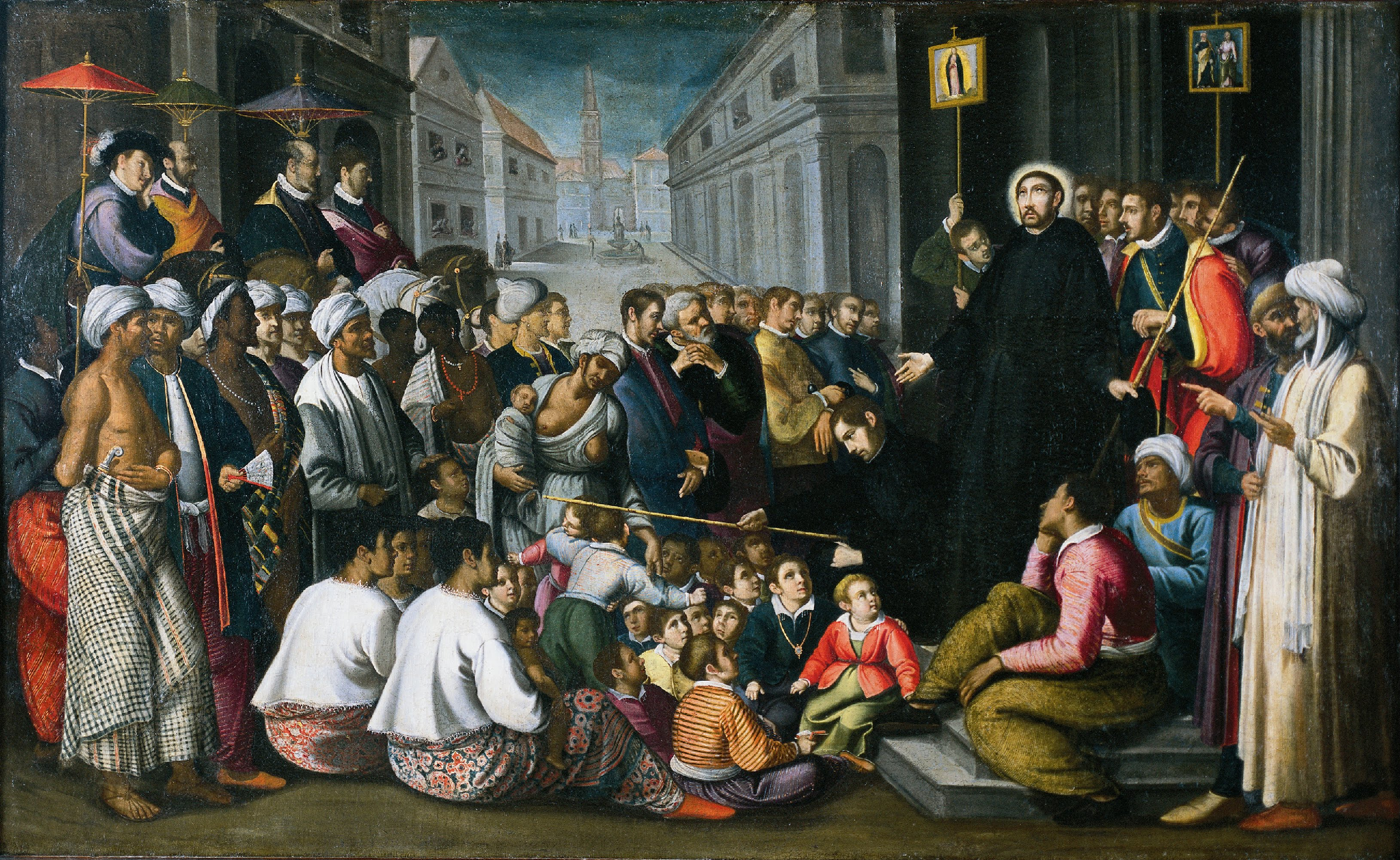
Saint Francis Xavier preaching in Goa (1610), by André Reinoso

The Diocese of Angamaly was transferred to Diocese of Craganore in 1605, and in 1606 a sixth suffragan see to Goa was established at San Thome, Mylapore, near the modern Madras. The suffragan sees added later to Goa were the prelacy of Mozambique in 1612 and Peking and Nanking in China in 1690.

Missionary work progressed on a large scale and with great success along the western coasts, chiefly at Chaul, Bombay, Salsette, Bassein, Damao, and Diu, as well as on the eastern coasts at San Thome of Mylapore as far as Bengal. In the southern districts the Jesuit mission in Madura was the most famous. It extended to the Krishna River, with a number of outlying stations beyond it. The mission of Cochin on the Malabar Coast was also one of the most fruitful. Several missions were also established in the interior northwards, e.g., that of Agra and Lahore in 1570 and that of Tibet in 1624. Still, even with these efforts, the greater part even of the coast line was by no means fully worked, and many vast tracts of the interior northwards were practically untouched.

With the decline of Portuguese power other colonial powers – the Dutch and British and Christian organisations – gained influence.

=== Japan ===
Portuguese shipping arrived in Japan in 1543. Catholic missionary activities in Japan began in earnest around 1549, performed in the main by Portuguese-sponsored Jesuits until Spanish-sponsored mendicant orders such as the Franciscans and Dominicans gained access to Japan. Of the 95 Jesuits who worked in Japan up to 1600, 57 were Portuguese, 20 were Spaniards and 18 Italian. Jesuit Fathers Francisco Xavier, Cosme de Torres, and Juan Fernández were the first to arrive at Kagoshima with hopes of bringing Catholic Christianity to Japan.

Spain and Portugal disputed the attribution of Japan. Since neither could colonize it, the exclusive right to propagate Christianity in Japan meant the exclusive right to trade with Japan. Portuguese-sponsored Jesuits under Alessandro Valignano took the lead in proselytizing in Japan over the objection of the Spaniards. This fait accompli was approved in Pope Gregory XIII's papal bull of 1575, which decided that Japan belonged to the Portuguese diocese of Macau. In 1588 the diocese of Funai (Nagasaki) was founded under Portuguese protection.

In rivalry with the Jesuits, Spanish-sponsored mendicant orders entered Japan via Manila. While criticizing Jesuit activities, they actively lobbied the Pope. Their campaigns resulted in Pope Clement VIII's decree of 1600 which allowed Spanish friars to enter Japan via the Portuguese Indies, and Pope Paul V's decree of 1608 which abolished the restrictions on the route. The Portuguese accused Spanish Jesuits of working for their homeland instead of their patron.

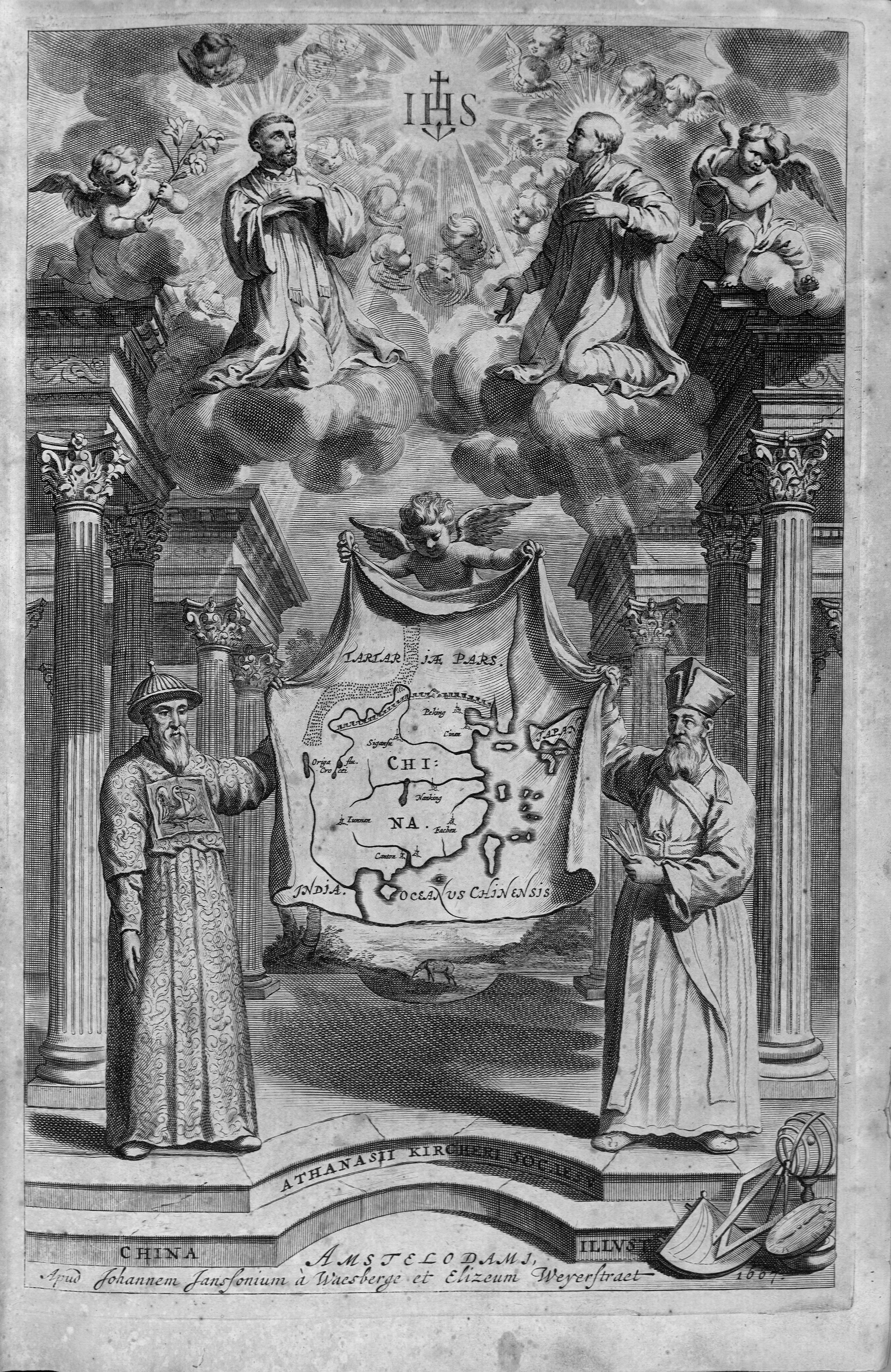
The frontispiece of Athanasius Kircher's 1667 China Illustrata, depicting Francis Xavier and Ignatius of Loyola adoring the monogram of Christ in Heaven while Johann Adam Schall von Bell and Matteo Ricci labor on the Jesuit China missions below.

=== China ===
The history of the missions of the Society of Jesus or Jesuits in Ming and Qing China stands as one of the notable events in the early history of relations between China and the Western world, as well as a prominent example of relations between two cultures and belief systems in the pre-modern age. The missionary efforts and other work of the Jesuits in 16th, 17th, and 18th century played a significant role in introducing European science and culture to China. Their work laid much of the foundation for much of Christian culture in Chinese society today. Members of the Jesuit delegation to China were perhaps the most influential Christian missionaries in that country between the earliest period of the religion up until the 19th century, when significant numbers of Catholic and Protestant missions developed.

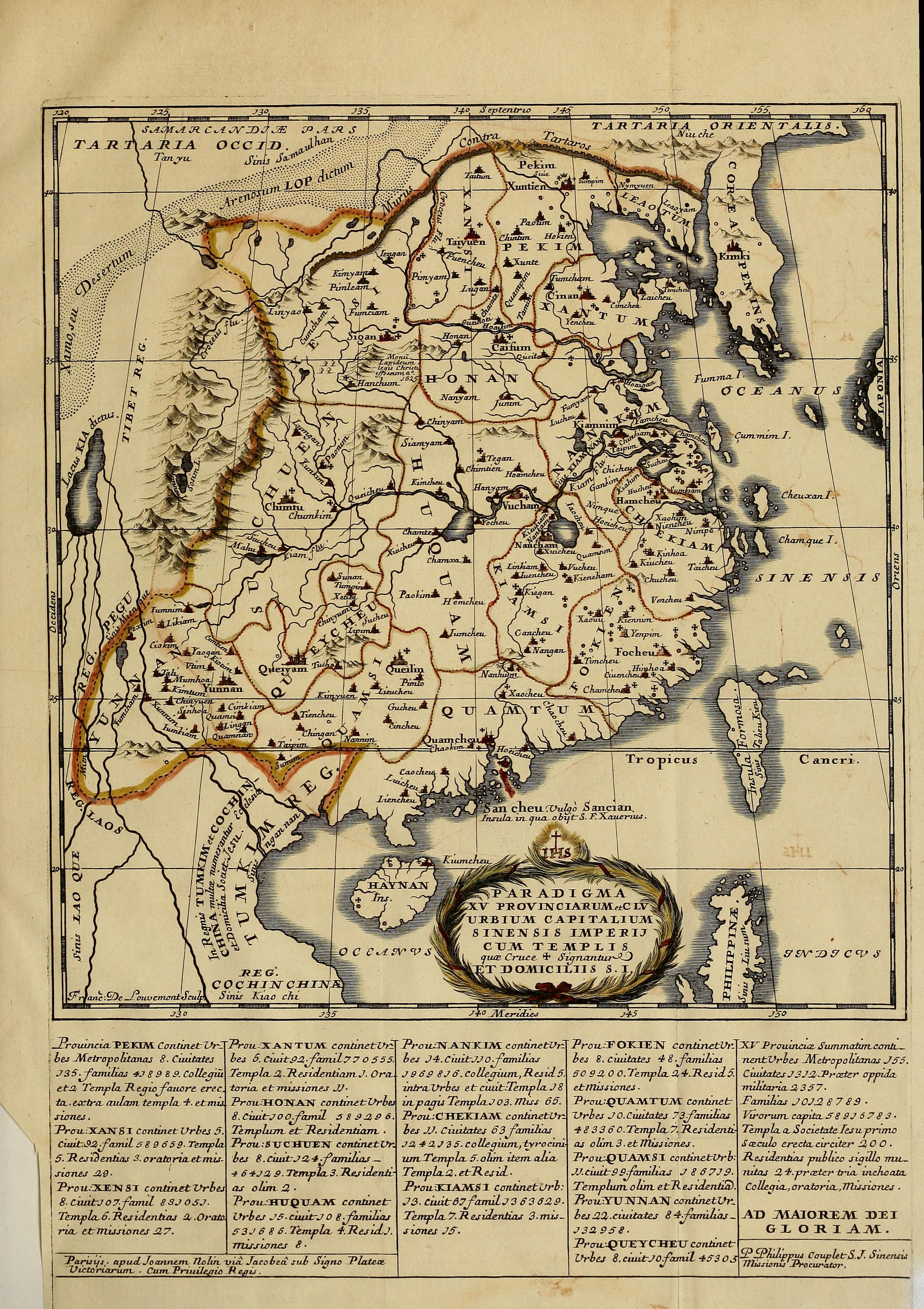
A map of the 200-odd Jesuit churches and missions established across China c. 1687.

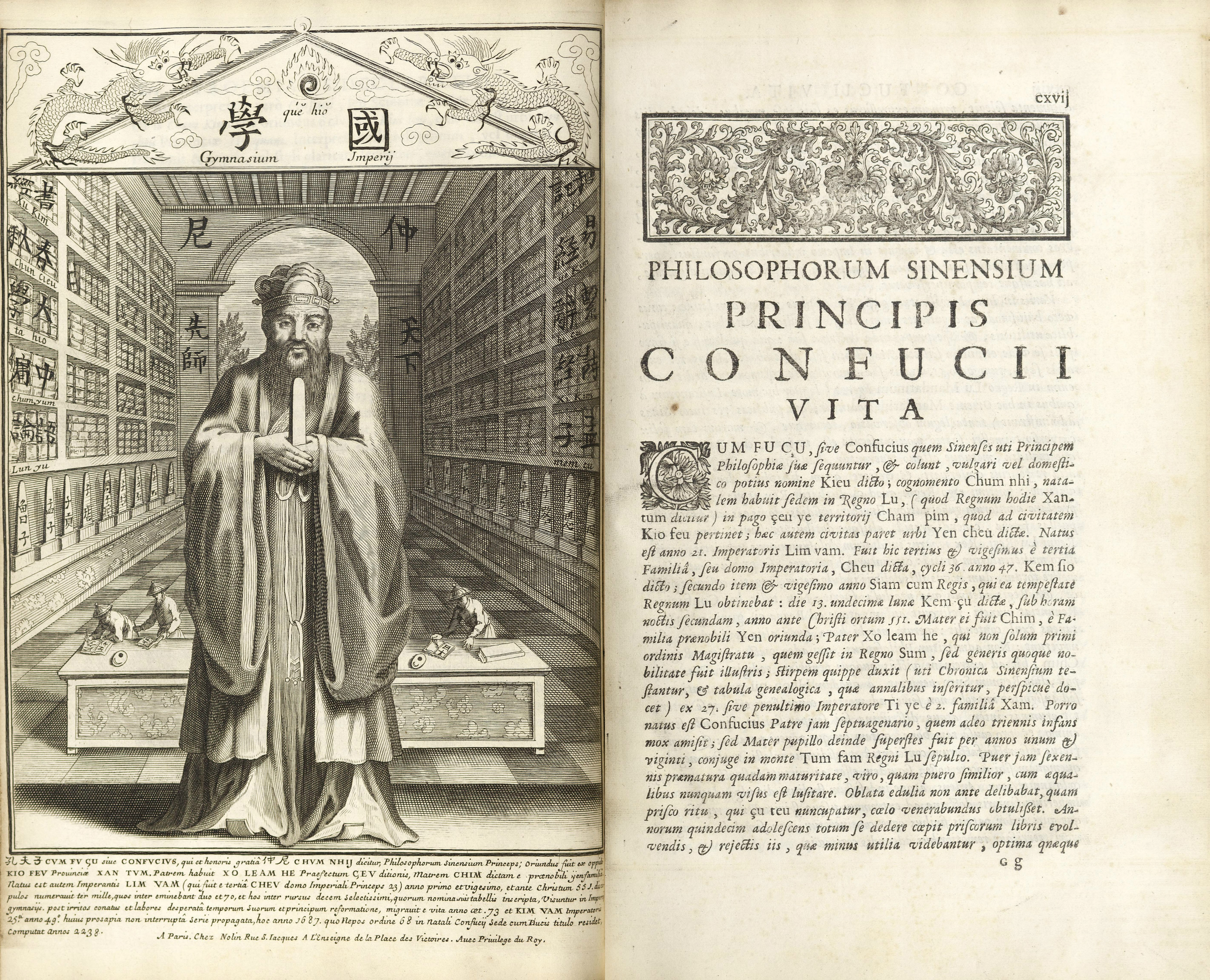
Confucius, Philosopher of the Chinese, or, Chinese Knowledge Explained in Latin, an introduction to Chinese history and philosophy published at Paris in 1687 by a team of Jesuits working under Philippe Couplet.

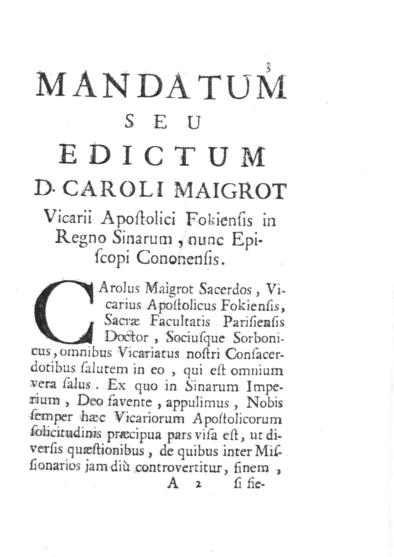
Charles Maigrot's 1693 Mandate, which reopened the Chinese Rites controversy

Despite earlier evangelization under the Tang and Yuan, by the 16th century there is no reliable evidence for any practicing Christians remaining in China. The Portuguese explorer Jorge Álvares reached Guangdong in 1513, establishing direct maritime connection between China and Europe; within six years of the Jesuit's 1540 founding, two Chinese boys were enrolled in their college in Goa, India. One of them, known by his baptismal name Antonio, travelled with the Jesuit founder St Francis Xavier when he tried to begin missionary work in China in the early 1550s. Unable to receive permission to enter the country, however, Xavier died on Shangchuan Island off the coast of Guangdong in 1552.

With the Portuguese establishing an enclave on Zhongshan Island's Macau Peninsula, Jesuits established a base nearby on Green Island (now the SAR's "Ilha Verde" neighborhood). Alessandro Valignano, the new regional manager ("visitor") of the order, came to Macau in 1578–1579 and established St. Paul's College to begin training future missionaries in the language and culture of the Chinese. He requested assistance from the orders' members in Goa in bringing over suitably talented linguists to staff the college and begin the mission in earnest.

In 1582, Jesuits once again initiated mission work inside China, introducing Western science, mathematics, astronomy, and cartography. Missionaries such as Matteo Ricci and Johann Adam Schall von Bell wrote Chinese catechisms and made influential converts like Xu Guangqi, establishing Christian settlements throughout the country and becoming close to the imperial court, particularly its Ministry of Rites, which oversaw official astronomy and astrology. "Jesuits were accepted in late Ming court circles as foreign literati, regarded as impressive especially for their knowledge of astronomy, calendar-making, mathematics, hydraulics, and geography." By 1610, more than two thousand Chinese from all levels of society had converted. Clark has summarized as follows:

"When all is said and done, one must recognize gladly that the Jesuits made a shining contribution to mission outreach and policy in China. They made no fatal compromises, and where they skirted this in their guarded accommodation to the Chinese reverence for ancestors, their major thrust was both Christian and wise. They succeeded in rendering Christianity at least respectable and even credible to the sophisticated Chinese, no mean accomplishment."

This influence worked in both directions:

[The Jesuits] made efforts to translate western mathematical and astronomical works into Chinese and aroused the interest of Chinese scholars in these sciences. They made very extensive astronomical observation and carried out the first modern cartographic work in China. They also learned to appreciate the scientific achievements of this ancient culture and made them known in Europe. Through their correspondence European scientists first learned about the Chinese science and culture.

Ricci and others including Michele Ruggieri, Philippe Couplet, and François Noël undertook a century-long effort in translating the Chinese classics into Latin and spreading knowledge of Chinese culture and history in Europe, influencing its developing Enlightenment.

The introduction of the Franciscans and other orders of missionaries, however, led to a long-running controversy over Chinese customs and names for God. The Jesuits, the secularized mandarins, and eventually the Kangxi Emperor himself maintained that Chinese veneration of ancestors and Confucius were respectful and secular rituals compatible with Christian doctrine; other orders pointed to the beliefs of the common people of China to show that it was impermissible idolatry and that the common Chinese names for God confused the Creator with His creation. Acting on the complaint of the Bishop of Fujian, Pope Clement XI finally ended the dispute with a decisive ban in 1704; his legate Charles-Thomas Maillard De Tournon issued summary and automatic excommunication of any Christian permitting Confucian rituals as soon as word reached him in 1707. By that time, however, Tournon and Bishop Maigrot had displayed such extreme ignorance in questioning before the throne that the Kangxi Emperor mandated the expulsion of Christian missionaries unable to abide by the terms of Ricci's Chinese catechism. Tournon's policies, confirmed by Clement's 1715 bull Ex Illa Die..., led to the swift collapse of all of the missions across China, with the last Jesuits—obliged to maintain allegiance to the papal rulings—finally being expelled after 1721.

Catholic mission work began again following the opening up of the country after the Treaty of Nanking in the 1830s. The Treaty of Huangpu institutionalised benefits for French Catholics, including the ability to operate and establish religious institutions in the treaty ports, decriminalisation of Catholicism throughout China, and providing that any missionaries discovered by Chinese authorities outside the treaty ports should be escorted to a French consulate.

France asserted its religious protectorate in China beginning in the 1840s. The French religious protectorate in China operated through two key functions: (1) it gave foreign missionaries access to China's interior, and (2) it defended Catholics in Chinese court proceedings. The protectorate provided a mechanism for France to expand its influence in China and gain prestige relative to the other European powers. France also obtained intelligence benefits, as missionaries were expected to relay useful information to French authorities. France obtained further privileges through the Sino-French Beijing Convention of 1860, which followed the Qing government's loss in the Second Opium War. Christian missionaries had the ability to travel anywhere in China's interior and buy property in China's interior.

In 1907, the publication of Canon Léon Joly's Le Christianisme et l'Extrême-Orient resulted in major reactions from Catholic missionaries in China. Léon Joly's's study of missionary histories in Asia concluded that Church missions had been a failure to date, achieving little despite major financial investments and personnel investment across centuries. In Léon Joly's view, Catholic missions in China had failed because of the Church's reliance on foreign political power and European clergy keeping Chinese in subordinate positions, creating European spiritual colonies rather than local churches.

Within months of his election, Pope Pius XII issued a further change in policies. On 8 December 1939, the Sacred Congregation for the Propagation of the Faith issued—at the request of Pope Pius—a new instruction, by which Chinese customs were no longer considered superstitious, but instead an honourable way of esteeming one's relatives and therefore permitted by the Catholic Church.

Pope Pius XII's initial move towards greater leniency was subsequently confirmed and expanded by Vatican II.

=== Middle East ===
Bishop Nicholas Samra notes that the Latin Church sent missionaries to the Middle East from the 1600's, ostensibly to convert Muslims, but unsuccessfully, "because Islam prohibited conversions to Christianity". Instead, their energies were devoted to "converting" Eastern Catholic and Orthodox Christians to Latin church practices.

=== Río de la Plata ===
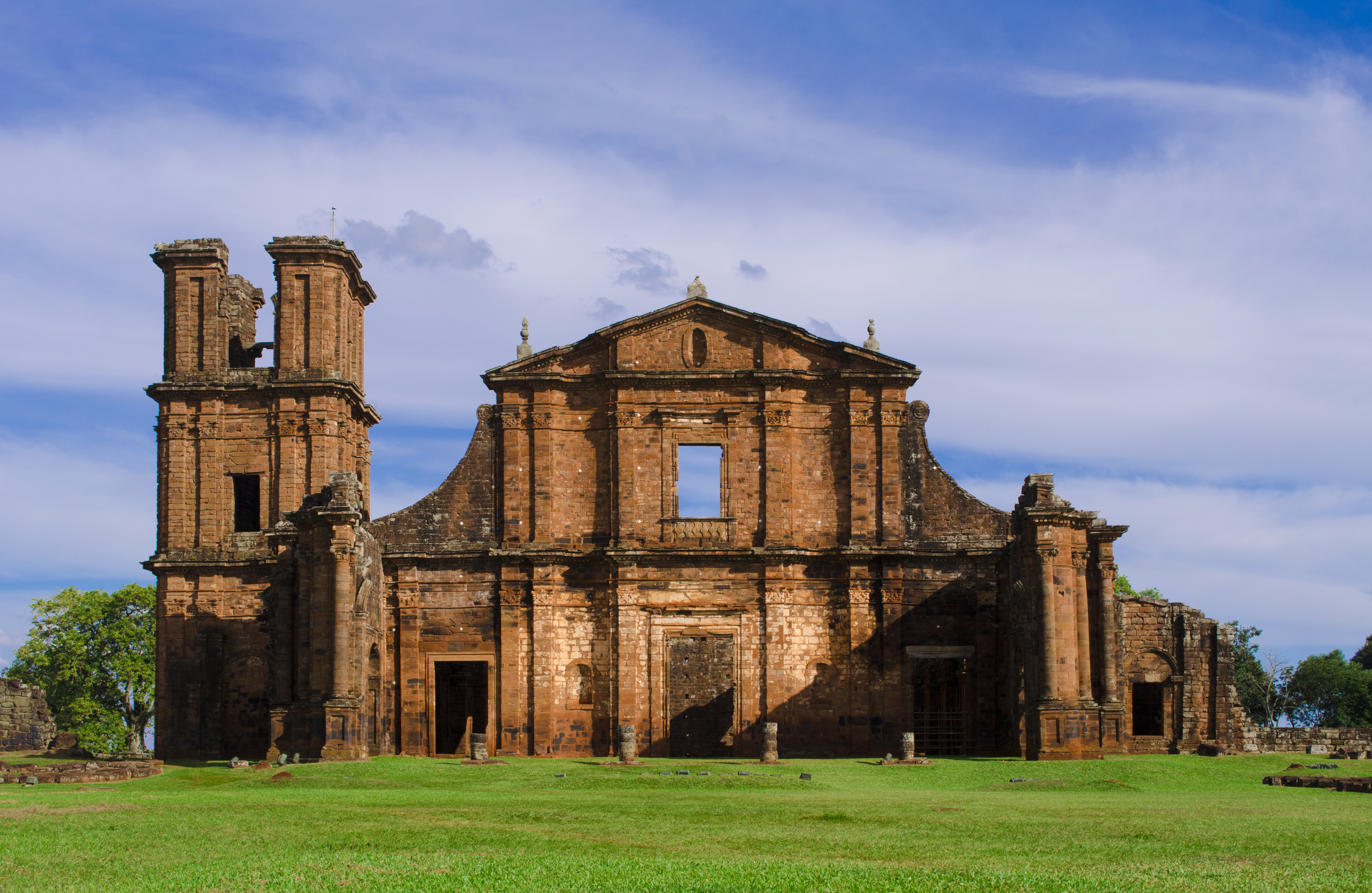
The Spanish Jesuit mission of São Miguel das Missões, Brazil

The missions were established by the Jesuit Order early in the 17th century and ended in the late 18th century after the expulsion of the Jesuit order from the Americas. The Jesuits attempted to create a "state within a state" in which the native peoples in the reductions, guided by the Jesuits, would remain autonomous and isolated from Spanish colonists and Spanish rule. A major factor attracting the natives to the reductions was the protection they afforded from enslavement and the forced labour of encomiendas.

=== Maya ===
There are records of Franciscan activity on the Americas as early as 1519. Throughout the early 16th century the mission movement spread from the Caribbean to Mexico, Central America, parts of South America, and the Southwest United States.

The goal of the Franciscan missions was to spread the Christian faith to the people of the New World through "word and example". Spreading Christianity to the newly discovered continent was a top priority, but only one piece of the Spanish colonization system. The influence of the Franciscans, considering that missionaries are sometimes seen as tools of imperialism, enabled other objectives to be reached, such as the extension of Spanish language, culture, and political control to the New World. A goal was to change the agricultural or nomadic Indian into a model of the Spanish people and society. Basically, the aim was for urbanization. The missions achieved this by "offering gifts and persuasion…and safety from enemies". This protection also offered security for the Spanish military operation, since there would be theoretically less warring if the natives were pacified. Thus the missionaries assisted with another aim of the colonizers.

=== California ===
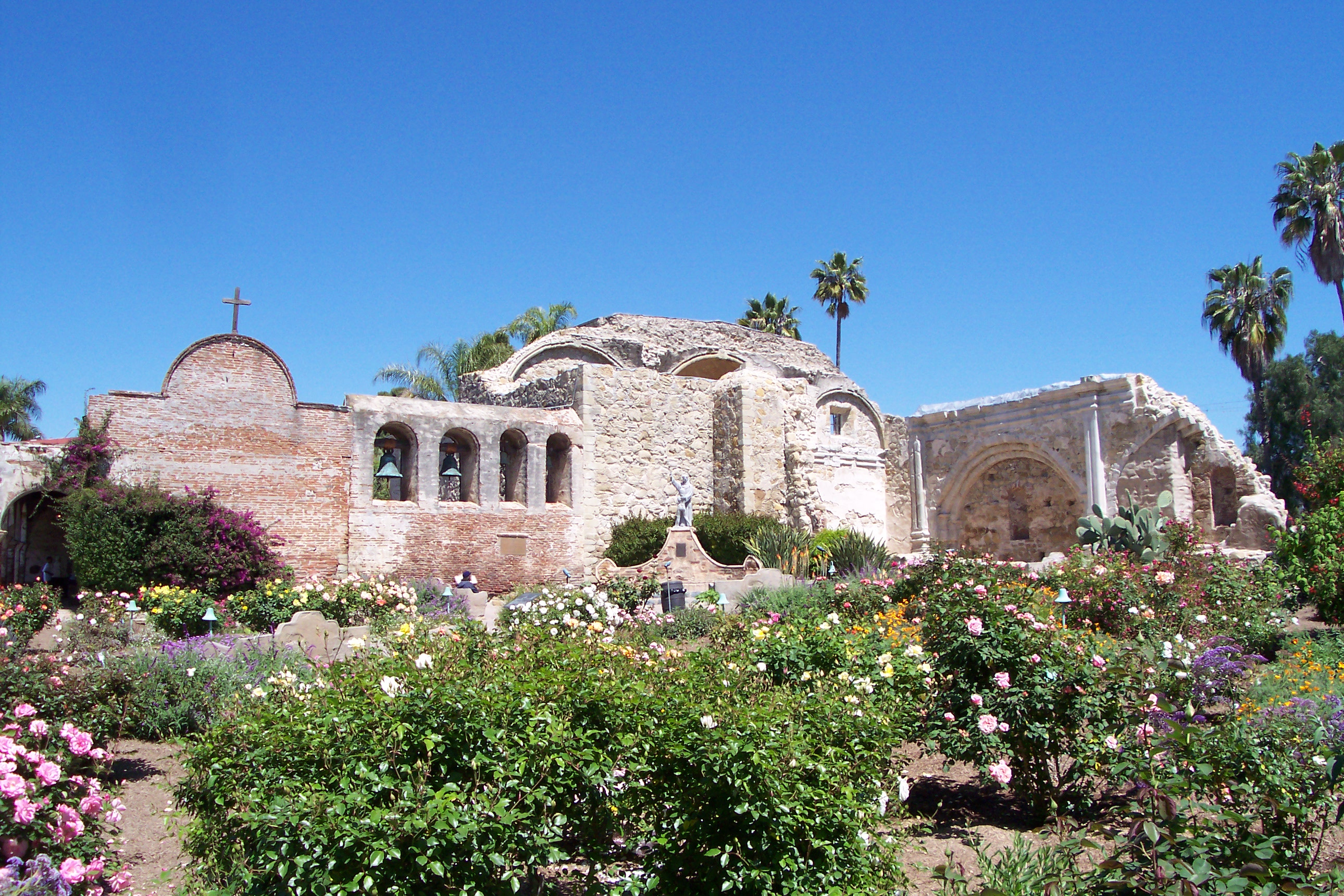
Mission San Juan Capistrano in April 2005. At left is the façade of the first adobe church with its added espadaña; behind the campanario or "bell wall" is the "Sacred Garden," in what is reputed as the "Loveliest of the Franciscan Ruins."

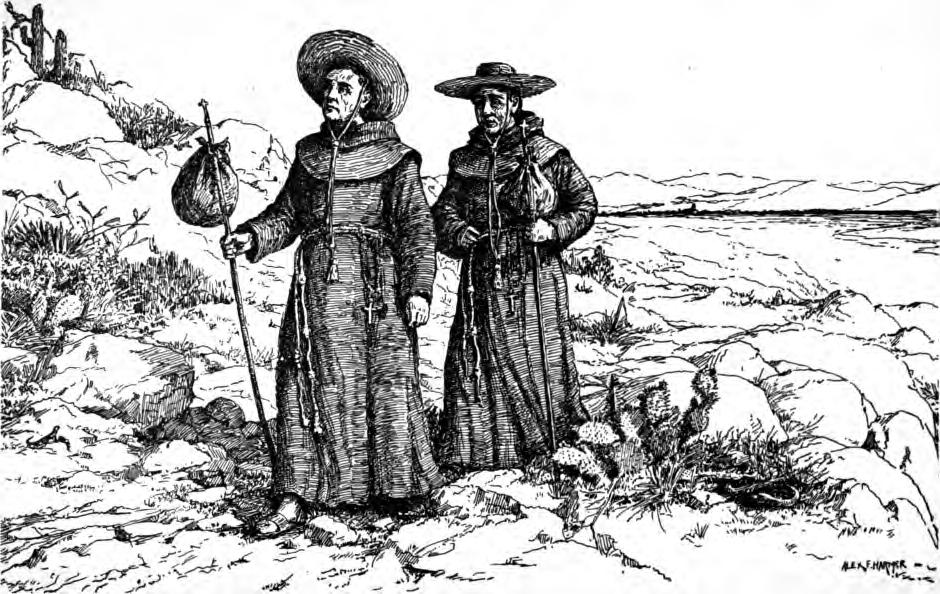
Franciscans of the California missions donned gray habits, in contrast to the brown cassocks that are typically worn today.

Between 1769 and 1823, Spanish members of the Franciscan Order established and operated 21 missions in California to convert the Native Americans. This was the first major effort by Europeans to colonize the Pacific Coast region and gave Spain a valuable toehold on this frontier. The settlers introduced European livestock, fruits, vegetables, and industry but Spanish occupation also brought negative consequences to the native populations. Today the missions are among the state's oldest structures and most-visited historic monuments; many of them also remain in operation as Catholic churches.

=== New Mexico ===
The missions in New Mexico were established by Franciscan friars to convert the local Pueblo, Navajo, and Apaches. The first permanent settlement was Mission San Gabriel in 1598 near what is now known as the San Juan Pueblo.

== Contemporary missions ==
Catholic missionary work has undergone profound change since the Second Vatican Council. It has prioritized social justice issues and striven to avoid the dangers of cultural imperialism or economic exploitation that had often accompanied religious conversion. Christian missionaries recognize that working for justice is a constitutive part of preaching the Gospel and usually observe the principles of inculturation in their missionary work. Before Vatican II "baptism of desire" and salvation outside the Catholic Church were allowed very little scope. With the Council's emphasis on individual conscience, baptism is seen not only as the ordinary means of salvation but as a vocation call for Christians to spread the good news of God's love to all peoples by their practice of true charity, that is universal and inclusive of all God's children.

The Church on mission through its various religious and lay associations is today much more involved in an option for the poor and integral human development than in proselytizing. In 2016 Pope Francis formed a Department for Promoting Integral Human Development in the Roman Curia to oversee numerous Catholic outreach programs fostered directly by the Vatican. Not that such missions are new; Caritas Internationalis is a confederation of Catholic relief, development, and social service organisations that date back since just after Pope Leo XIII's social encyclical Rerum novarum in 1893, and today Jesuit missions, as in Africa and India, are more involved in educating and further assisting the poorest rural populations, such as the Dalits and Adivasi in India, than in direct conversion efforts. This is true also in China, where proselytizing was forbidden but many Christians assist with language studies. Present-day practice in Asia and Africa is detailed in the articles on hundreds of educational institutions and development centres that the Jesuits administer. Much the same can be said of other Catholic lay and religious groups and their contemporary missions.

== See also ==
- Catholic Church in China
- Catholic Church in Sichuan
- Catholic Church in Tibet
- List of Roman Catholic missionaries
  - List of Roman Catholic missionaries in China
- Spanish missions in the Americas
  - Spanish missions in South America
- Spanish Redemptorist missions in Sichuan
- Evangelism
- Fidesco International
- Society for the Propagation of the Faith
