= Late Middle Japanese =

Form of Japanese spoken from the 12th century through the 16th century

- 日本語
- Region: Japan
- Era: Evolved into Early Modern Japanese in the 17th century
- Language family: Japonic: Japanese; Late Middle Japanese
- Early forms: Old Japanese: Early Middle Japanese
- Writing system: Hiragana, Katakana, and Kanji

Language codes
- ISO 639-3: –
- Glottolog: None

Late Middle Japanese (中世日本語, chūsei nihongo) was a stage of the Japanese language following Early Middle Japanese and preceding Early Modern Japanese. It was a period of transition in which the language shed many of its archaic features and became closer to its modern form.

The period spanned roughly 500 years from the 12th century to the 16th century and is itself customarily divided into Early and Late periods. Politically, the first half of Late Middle Japanese was the end of the Heian period, known as Insei and the Kamakura period. The second half of Late Middle Japanese was the Muromachi period.

== Background ==
The late 12th century was a time of transition from the aristocratic society of nobles in the Heian period to the feudal society of the warrior class. Accompanying that change, the nation's political center temporarily transitioned from historical Kyoto to Kanto alongside the establishment of the Kamakura shogunate. This move resulted in a significant blend between the dialects of Kyoto and Kanto, shaping the language of the time.

During this period, various Buddhist movements found their footing, leading to an overall increase in literacy.

In the mid-16th century, Portuguese Christian missionaries arrived in Japan. Alongside Western technology and philosophy, the Portuguese brought various loanwords to the Japanese language.

In an attempt to spread Christianity among the locals, many Portuguese missionaries studied Japanese, producing a number of dictionaries and linguistic grammars such as the Arte da Lingoa de Iapam and Nippo Jisho, in addition to producing translations of Japanese literary works. Today, these materials serve a vital role in the study of medieval Japanese language.

== Phonology ==
=== Vowels ===
There were five vowels: /i, e, a, o, u/.

- /i/: [i]
- /e/: [je], [e]?
- /a/: [a]
- /o/: [wo], [o]?
- /u/: [u]

Syllable-initially, /e/ and /o/ were realized with semivowels [j] and [w], respectively, a result of earlier mergers inherited from Early Middle Japanese. According to Nakata (1972), it is unclear how they were realized when they were preceded by a consonant. Frellesvig (2010) argues that consonants were always palatalized before /i, e/, as in Early Middle Japanese.

In addition, there were two types of long o, [ɔː] and [oː], known respectively in Japanese as kaion (開音; lit. 'open sound') and gōon (合音; lit. 'closed sound'). The vowel sequence /au/ contracted into [ɔː], and /ou/ and /eu/ contracted into [oː] and [joː], respectively:

- /ɸayaku/ (historical orthography: はやう) "quickly": [ɸajaku] > [ɸajau] > [ɸajɔː];
- /omoɸu/ (historical orthography: おもふ) "think": [womoɸu] > [womou] > [womoː];
- /keɸu/ (historical orthography: けふ) "today": [keɸu] > [keu] > [kjoː].

=== Consonants ===
Late Middle Japanese had the following consonants:

	Bilabial	Alveolar	Postalveolar	Palatal	Velar	Uvular
Plosive	p b	t d			k ɡ	
Affricate		t͡s d͡z	t͡ɕ d͡ʑ			
Nasal	m	n				ɴ
Fricative	ɸ	s z	ɕ ʑ			
Liquid			r			
Approximant				j	w	

In addition were two phonemes: /N/ and /Q/. "Before a pause, /N/ is a uvular [ɴ]; it assimilates to the place of articulation of a following stop, affricate, or nasal." "/Q/ becomes a phonetic copy of a following obstruent."

- /s, z/, /t, d/, /n/, /h, b/, /p/, /m/, and /r/ could be palatalized.

Labialized consonants /kw, gw/ appeared during Early Middle Japanese. Labialized consonants before -i and -e merged with their non-labial counterparts. Specifically:

- /kwi/ > /ki/
- /gwi/ > /gi/
- /kwe/ > /ke/
- /gwe/ > /ge/

The distinction between /ka/ and /kwa/ remained.

The sibilants /s, z/ were palatalized before /i/ and /e/ and had the following distribution:

- /sa, za/: [sa, za]
- /si, zi/: [ɕi, ʑi]
- /su, zu/: [su, zu]
- /se, ze/: [ɕe, ʑe]
- /so, zo/: [so, zo]

João Rodrigues noted in Arte da Lingoa de Iapam that the eastern dialects were known for realizing /se/ as [se], rather than [ɕe]. Note that /se, ze/ has become [se, ze] in Modern Japanese but retained [ɕi, ʑi] for /si, zi/.

/t/ and /d/ were distinguished from the sibilants in all positions but undergo affrication before /i, u/:

- /ti, di/: [t͡ɕi, d͡ʑi]
- /tu, du/: [tsu, dzu]

==== Prenasalization ====
Voiced stops and fricatives were prenasalized:

- /g/: [ᵑɡ]
- /z/: [ⁿz]
- /d/: [ⁿd]
- /b/: [ᵐb]

João Rodrigues made that observation in Arte da Lingoa de Iapam. In addition, the Korean text Ch'ŏphae sinŏ "spelled [...] b, d, z, g with the Hangul letter sequences -mp-, -nt-, -nz-, -ngk-", indicating prenasalization.

The effects of prenasalization may also be seen in the transcription of words such as muma < /uma/ "horse" and mube < /ube/ "truly".

==== /h/ and /p/ ====
While the proto-Japonic language contained *[p], by the Early Middle Japanese stage, this had already lenited to [ɸ]. Late Middle Japanese reintroduced [p], which had a phonemic contrast with [ɸ] and was treated as a distinct phoneme.

In Early Modern Japanese, [ɸ] became [h]; in many dialects, [h] is still the modern form. [p] is found in mimetic words, such as pinpin and patto, and also occurs instead of h in loanwords from the Sinitic languages in two environments: after moraic /N/ (sanpai), and when geminated (Nippon).

Medial /ɸ/ became [w] before /a/. Before all other vowels, it became silent:

- /-ɸa/: [wa], e.g. "river" /kaɸa/ (かは) [kaɸa] > [kawa]
- /-ɸi/: [i], e.g. "new bride" /niɸiduma/ (にひづま) [niɸiⁿdzuma] > [ni:ⁿdzuma]; "drunkenness" /jeɸi/ (ゑひ) [jeɸi] > [jei] (> obsolete reading [ei]) ~ /joɸi/ (よひ) [joɸi] > [joi] (> modern reading [joi]).
- /-ɸu/: [u], e.g. "to chase" /oɸu/ (おふ) [woɸu] > [wou]
- /-ɸe/: [je], e.g. "house" /iɸe/ (いへ) [iɸe] > [ije]
- /-ɸo/: [wo], e.g. "distant, faraway" /toɸo/ (とほ) [toɸo] > [towo]

==== Glides ====
/w/ had the following distribution:

- /wa/: [wa]
- /wi/: [i]
- /we/: [je]
- /wo/: [wo]

The prior merger between /o/ and /wo/ into [wo] during Early Middle Japanese continued into Late Middle Japanese, with /e/ and /we/ merging into [je] by the 12th century.

/j/ had the following distribution:

- /ja/: [ja]
- /ju/: [ju]
- /je/: [je]
- /jo/: [jo]

Various mergers, /e/, /we/ and /je/ made all realized as [je] and thus indistinguishable.

=== Syllable structure ===
Traditionally, syllables were of (C)V structure and so there was no need to distinguish between syllables and morae. However, Chinese loanwords introduced a new type of sound that could end in -m, -n, or -t. That structure is the syllable (C)V(C). The mora is based on the traditional (C)V structure.

The final syllables -m and -n were initially distinguished; but by the end of the Early period, both had merged into /N/.

=== Medial gemination ===
The final syllables -m, -n, -t before a vowel or a glide underwent gemination and became the consonant clusters -mm-, -nn-, and -tt-.

-m > -mm-:

- samwi > sammi "third rank"

-n > -nn-:

- ten'wau > tennau > tennoː "Emperor of Japan"
- kwan'on > kwannon "Guanyin"
- kon'ya > konnya "tonight"

-t > -tt-:

- set'in > settin 雪隠 "toilet"
- konnitwa > konnitta "as for today"
- but'on > button "blessing of Buddha"

=== Onbin ===
Onbin (音便; "euphony") are a type of sporadic sound changes and "were not automatic or exceptionless," and their exact causes are still debated. They also appear in earlier stages of the language but were particularly prevalent throughout Late Middle Japanese and had a great effect on its verbal and adjectival morphology.

Verbs:

- yom- "read": /jomite/ > /joNde/ [joɴde]
- kuh- "eat": /kuɸite/ > /kuute/ [kuːte] :: /kuQte/ [kutte]

The kuh- example had two possible outcomes. The former was particular of the western dialects, and the latter was particular of the eastern dialects.

Adjectives:

- /ɸajaku/ "quickly" > /ɸajau/: [ɸajaku] > [ɸajau] > [ɸajɔː]
- /kataki/ "hard" > /katai/ [katai]

In both words, the medial velar -k- became silent by elision.

== Morphology ==
A number of archaic grammatical forms were lost in this period, bringing the language closer to its modern form.

One of the most prominent developments was the replacement of the conclusive form by the attributive, which has a number of effects:

- It was instrumental in changing from bigrade to monograde verbs.
- It caused a chain of events in the two adjectival classes that eventually resulted in both merging into one.
- It weakened the kakarimusubi system.
- The verb ar- "be", which was once irregular, began to regularize as a quadrigrade.

=== Verbs ===
Late Middle Japanese inherited all nine verbal conjugations from Early Middle Japanese:

Verb Class	Irrealis	Adverbial	Conclusive	Attributive	Realis	Imperative
Quadrigrade	-a	-i	-u	-u	-e	-e
Upper Monograde	-i	-i	-iru	-iru	-ire	-i(yo)
Upper Bigrade	-i	-i	-u	-uru	-ure	-i(yo)
Lower Monograde	-e	-e	-eru	-eru	-ere	-e(yo)
Lower Bigrade	-e	-e	-u	-uru	-ure	-e(yo)
K-irregular	-o	-i	-u	-uru	-ure	-o
S-irregular	-e	-i	-u	-uru	-ure	-e(yo)
N-irregular	-a	-i	-u	-uru	-ure	-e
R-irregular	-a	-i	-i	-u	-e	-e

However, throughout the period, bigrade verbs gradually changed into monogrades. The process was completed by Early Modern Japanese, partly a result of the merger of the conclusive and attributive forms.

=== Adjectives ===
There were two types of adjectives: regular adjectives and adjectival nouns.

==== Regular adjectives ====
The regular adjective was traditionally subdivided into two types: those whose adverbial form ends in -ku and those whose ends in –siku:

Adjective Class	Irrealis	Adverbial	Conclusive	Attributive	Realis	Imperative	Notes
-ku		-ku	-si	-ki			
-ku		-u	-ki	-i			Early
-ku		-u	-i	-i			Late
-ku	-kara	-kari		-karu	-kere	-kare	
-siku		-siku	-si	-siki			
-siku		-siu	-sisi	-sii			Early
-siku		-siu	-sii	-sii			Late
-siku	-sikara	-sikari		-sikaru	-sikere	-sikare	

There were three notable changes that eventually collapsed the two-way distinction into one:

- In Early Middle Japanese, the -siku conclusive develops a -sisi form.
- The conclusive and attributive forms merged.
- In Late Middle Japanese, adjectival suffix -ki was reduced to -i

While the grammatical distinction between the two classes has disappeared, the historic distinction was used to explain certain present forms of -shii adjectives, notably the euphonic changes (音便) that occur in polite form of adjectives (when they are followed by ござる gozaru 'to be' or 存じる zonjiru 'to know').

==== Adjectival nouns ====
There were two classes of adjectival nouns inherited from Early Middle Japanese: -nar and -tar.

Type	Irrealis	Adverbial	Conclusive	Attributive	Realis	Imperative	Notes
Nar-	-nara	-nari -ni	-nari	-naru -na	-nare		Early
Nar-	-nara	-ni -de	-dya -na	-naru -na -no	-nare		Late
Tar-		-to	-tari	-taru			Early
Tar-		-to		-taru			Late

The most prominent development was the reduction of attributive -naru to -na. When the conclusive and attributive merged, they both share the new -na. The tar- type becomes more archaic and was continually reduced in distribution. In Modern Japanese, a few naru-adjectives and taru-adjectives remain as fossils.

=== Hypothetical ===
The realis base developed into the hypothetical. The realis described something that had already occurred. That usage began to fade and resulted in the use of the hypothetical for events that have not already occurred. Note that Modern Japanese has only a hypothetical and has lost this realis base.

=== Imperative ===
The imperative traditionally ended either with no suffix or with -yo. During Late Middle Japanese, -i was attached to lower bigrade, k-irregular, and s-irregular verbs:

- kure + i: kurei "give me"
- ko + i: koi "come"
- se + i: sei "do"

João Rodrigues Tçuzu noted in Arte da Lingoa de Iapam that -yo could be replaced with -ro, as in miyo > miro "look." Note that the eastern dialects of Old Japanese in the 8th century also contained the -ro imperative, which is the standard imperative in Modern Japanese.

=== Tense and aspect ===
The tense and aspect systems underwent radical changes. The perfective n-, t-, and r- and the past k-/s- and ker- became obsolete and were replaced by tar- which developed from the perfective aspect into a common past tense. It eventually became ta-, the modern past tense.

=== Particles ===
The new case particle de was developed from ni te.

The conjectured suffix -mu underwent a number of phonological changes: mu > m > N > ũ. Combining with the vowel from the irrealis base to which it attached, it then became a long vowel, sometimes with -y- preceding it, forming the basis of the -ō/-yō volitional form.

== See also ==
- List of Japanese words of Portuguese origin
