= Arte da Lingoa de Iapam =

17th century Portuguese grammar of Japanese

Cover of the book

The Arte da Lingoa de Iapam (lit. 'Art of the Tongue of Japan'; Japanese: 日本大文典, romanized: Nihon Daibunten) is an early 17th-century Japanese grammar written in Portuguese. It was compiled by João Rodrigues, a Portuguese Jesuit missionary. It is the oldest fully extant Japanese grammar and is a valuable reference for the late middle period of the Japanese language.

== Background ==
Christian missionary work in Japan began in the 1540s, necessitating the learning of its language. Missionaries created dictionaries and grammars. Early grammars seem to have been written in the 1580s, but are no longer extant.

João Rodrigues arrived in Japan as a teenager and became so fluent that he was mostly known to locals as "the Translator" (Tsūji); he served as the translator of visiting Jesuit overseers, as well as for the kampaku Toyotomi Hideyoshi and the shōgun Tokugawa Ieyasu. His Arte da Lingoa de Iapam is the oldest extant complete Japanese grammar. Rodrigues published it in three volumes at Nagasaki over the five years between 1604 and 1608. In addition to vocabulary and grammar, it includes details on the country's dynasties, currency, measures, and other commercial information. There are only two known copies: one at the Bodleian Library at the University of Oxford and the other in the Crawford family collection. There is also a manuscript by Leon Pagès.

Following a violent suppression of marauding Japanese sailors in Macao in 1608 and court intrigues the next year, however, Tokugawa resolved to replace Portuguese traders with red seal ships, the Dutch, and the Spanish in early 1610. After a successful assault on a Portuguese ship then in Nagasaki Bay, he permitted most of the missionaries to remain but replaced Rodrigues with the Englishman William Adams.

Rodrigues then joined the China missions, where he published a terser revised grammar called The Short Art of the Japanese Language (Portuguese: Arte Breue da Lingoa Iapoa; Japanese: 日本小文典,Nihon Shōbunten) at Macao in 1620. It reformulates the treatment of grammar in the earlier "Great Art" (Arte Grande), establishing clear and concise rules regarding the principal features of the Japanese language.

== Contents ==
The grammar is three volumes in length.

- Volume 1 is an outline of fundamental Japanese grammar. It discusses the declension of nouns and pronouns with respect to case particles, the conjugation of verbs with respect to mood and tense, categorizes the language into ten parts of speech, discusses honorifics, as well as romanization orthography.
- Volume 2 discusses syntax, rhetoric, dialects, pronunciation, accent, and poetry.
- Volume 3 describes how to read kanji, documents, personal names, and how to count Japanese years and time.

== Editions ==
- Arte da lingua de Iapam by father João Rodrigues Originally published in Nagasaki: Collegio de Iapao da Companhia de Iesv, 1604-1608, first grammar of the Japanese language, in Portuguese, by the missionary João Rodrigues
- Arte da lingoa de Iapam (1604)
- Élémens de la grammaire japonaise [abridged from Arte da lingoa de Iapam] tr. et collationnés par C. Landresse. [With] (1825)

The Great Art was translated into Japanese by Tadao Doi (土井忠生) in 1955.

The Short Art was translated into French by M.C. Landresse as Elements of Japanese Grammar (Elémens de la Grammaire Japonaise) in 1825, with a supplement added the next year.

== See also ==
- Nippo Jisho
- Arte da Lingoa Canarim – 16th-century Konkani language grammar
- Art of Grammar of the Most Used Language on the Coast of Brazil – 1595 book by Joseph of Anchieta
- Arte de la lengua mexicana con la declaración de los adverbios della – Nahuatl grammar book
- Arte de la lengua mexicana y castellana – 1571 grammar of Nahuatl by Alonso de Molina

== Bibliography ==
- Chan, Albert (1976), "João Rodrígues", Dictionary of Ming Biography, 1368–1644, Vol. II: M–Z, New York: Columbia University Press, pp. 1145–47, ISBN 9780231038331.
- Doi, Tadao (1955) [1604-1608]. Nihon Daibunten (in Japanese). Sanseidō. ISBN 978-4-8301-0297-4.
- Hino, Hiroshi (1993). Nihon Shōbunten (in Japanese). Shin-Jinbutsu-Ōrai-Sha.
- Ikegami, Mineo (1993) [1620]. Nihongo Shōbunten (in Japanese). Iwanami Shoten. ISBN 4-00-336811-8.
- Nihon Koten Bungaku Daijiten: Kan'yakuban [A Comprehensive Dictionary of Classical Japanese Literature: Concise Edition]. Tōkyō: Iwanami Shoten. 1986. ISBN 4-00-080067-1. OCLC 22820487.
