= Early Modern Japanese =

Ancient form of Japanese

- 近世日本語
- Region: Japan
- Era: Evolved into Modern Japanese in the mid-19th century
- Language family: Japonic: Japanese; Early Modern Japanese
- Early forms: Old Japanese: Early Middle Japanese; Late Middle Japanese
- Writing system: Hiragana, Katakana, and Kanji

Language codes
- ISO 639-3: –
- Glottolog: None

Early Modern Japanese (近世日本語, kinsei nihongo) was the stage of the Japanese language after Middle Japanese and before Modern Japanese. It is a period of transition that shed many of the characteristics that Middle Japanese had retained during the language's development from Old Japanese, thus becoming intelligible to modern Japanese.

The period spanned roughly 250 years and extended from the 17th century to the first half of the 19th century. Politically, it generally corresponded to the Edo period.

== Background ==
At the beginning of the 17th century, the center of government moved to Edo from Kamigata under the control of the Tokugawa shogunate and Japan closed its borders to foreigners. Until the early Edo period, the Kamigata dialect, the ancestor of the modern Kansai dialect, was the most influential dialect. However, in the late Edo period, the Edo dialect, the ancestor of the modern Tokyo dialect, became the most influential dialect. Compared to the previous centuries, the Tokugawa rule brought about much newfound stability. That made the importance of the warrior class gradually fall and replaced it with the merchant class. There was much economic growth, and new artistic developments appeared, such as Ukiyo-e, Kabuki, and Bunraku. New literary genres such as Ukiyozōshi, Sharebon (pleasure districts), Kokkeibon (commoners), and Ninjōbon also developed. Major authors included Ihara Saikaku, Chikamatsu Monzaemon, Matsuo Bashō, Shikitei Sanba, and Santō Kyōden.

== Phonology ==
=== Consonants ===
Middle Japanese had the following consonants:

	Bilabial	Alveolar	Postalveolar	Palatal	Velar	Uvular	Glottal
Stop	p b	t d			k ɡ		
Affricate		t͡s d͡z	t͡ɕ d͡ʑ				
Nasal	m	n				ɴ	
Fricative	ɸ	s z	ɕ ʑ	ç			h
Liquid			r				
Approximant				j	ɰ		

/t, s, z, h/ all have a number of allophones before the high vowels [i, ɯ]:

- t → t͡ɕ / __i
- t → t͡s / __ɯ
- z → d͡ʑ / __i
- z → d͡z / __ɯ
- h → ç / __i
- h → ɸ / __ɯ

Several major developments occurred:

- /zi, di/ and /zu, du/, respectively, no longer contrasted.
- /h/ partially developed from [ɸ] into [h, ç].
- /se/ lost its palatalization and became [se].

Middle Japanese had a syllable final -t, which was gradually replaced by the open syllable /tu/.

=== Labialization ===
The labial /kwa, gwa/ merged with their non-labial counterparts into [ka, ga].

=== Palatalization ===
The consonants /s, z/, /t/, /n/, /h, b/, /p/, /m/, and /r/ could be palatalized.

Depalatalization could also be seen in the Edo dialect:

- hyakunin issyu > hyakunisi
- /teisyu/ > /teisi/ "lord"
- /zyumyoː/ > /zimyoː/ "life"

=== Prenasalization ===
Middle Japanese had a series of prenasalized voiced plosives and fricatives: [^{ŋ}ɡ, ⁿz, ⁿd, ᵐb]. In Early Modern Japanese, they lost their prenasalization, which resulted in ɡ, z, d, b.

== Grammar ==
=== Verbs ===
Early Modern Japanese has five verbal conjugations:

Verb Class	Irrealis 未然形	Adverbial 連用形	Conclusive 終止形	Attributive 連体形	Hypothetical 仮定形	Imperative 命令形
Quadrigrade (四段)	-a	-i	-u	-u	-e	-e
Upper Monograde(上一段)	-i	-i	-iru	-iru	-ire	-i(yo, ro)
Lower Monograde (下一段)	-e	-e	-eru	-eru	-ere	-e(yo, ro)
K-irregular (カ変)	-o	-i	-uru	-uru	-ure	-oi
S-irregular (サ変)	-e, -a, -i	-i	-uru	-uru	-ure	-ei, -iro

As had already begun in Middle Japanese, the verbal morphology system continued to evolve. The total number of verb classes was reduced from nine to five. Specifically, the r-irregular and n-irregular regularized as quadrigrade, and the upper and lower bigrade classes merged with their respective monograde. That left the quadrigrade, upper monograde, lower monograde, k-irregular, and s-irregular.

=== Adjectives ===
There were two types of adjectives: regular adjectives and adjectival nouns.

Historically, adjectives were subdivided into two classes: those whose adverbial form ended in -ku and those that ended in –siku. That distinction was lost in Early Modern Japanese.

Irrealis 未然形	Adverbial 連用形	Conclusive 終止形	Attributive 連体形	Hypothetical 仮定形	Imperative 命令形
-kara	-ku	-i	-i	-kere	-kare

Historically, the adjectival noun was sub-divided into two categories: -nar and -tar. In Early Modern Japanese, -tar vanished and left only -na.

Irrealis 未然形	Adverbial 連用形	Conclusive 終止形	Attributive 連体形	Hypothetical 仮定形	Imperative 命令形
-da ra	-ni -de	-na -da	-na	-nare -nara	
