= Nippo Jisho =

1603 Japanese–Portuguese dictionary

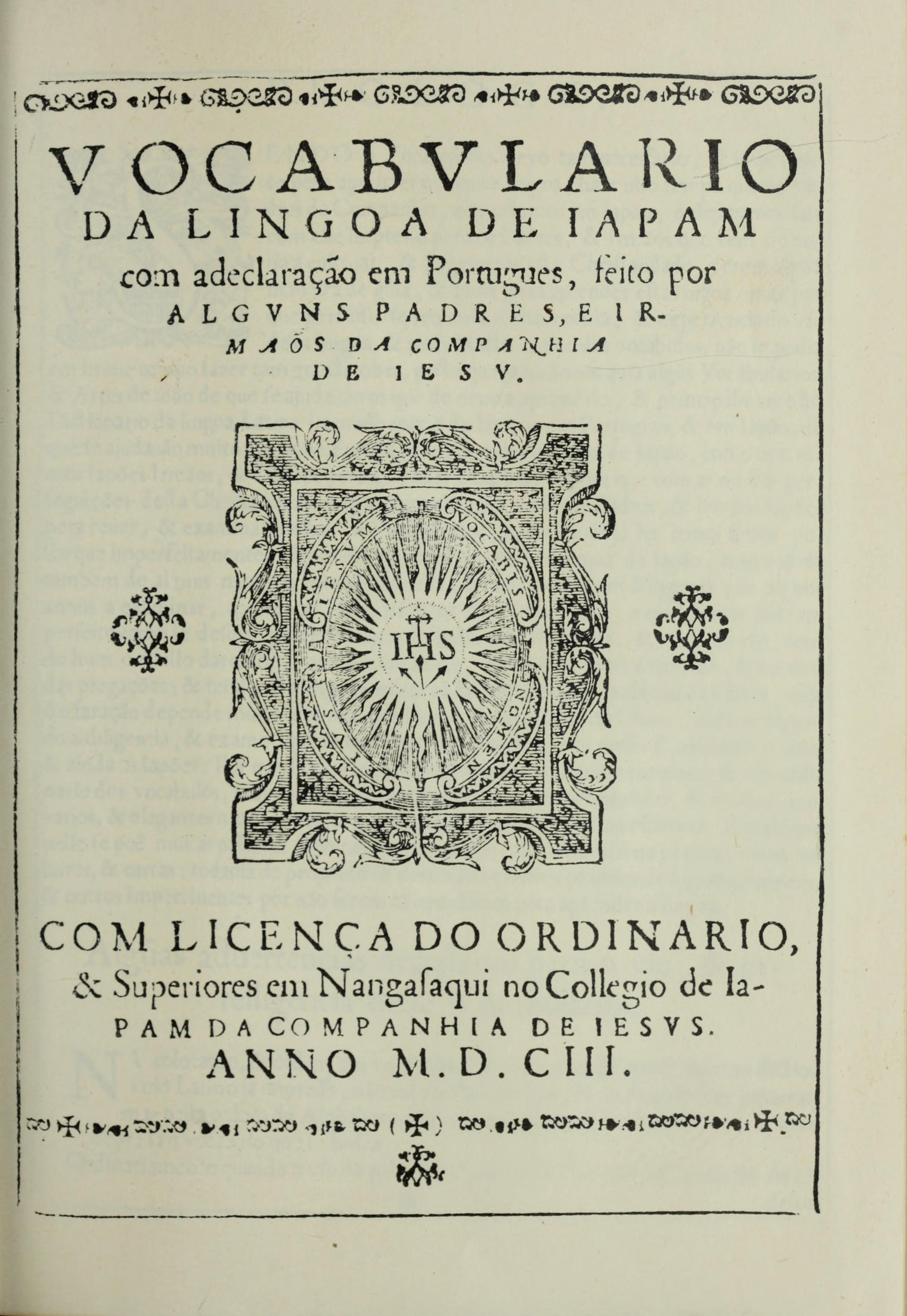
- Title page
- Original title: Vocabulario da lingoa de Iapam
- Language: Japanese and Portuguese
- Publication date: 1603
- Publication place: Japan
- Original text: Vocabulario da lingoa de Iapam at Gallica

The Nippo Jisho (日葡辞書, literally the "Japanese–Portuguese Dictionary") or Vocabulario da Lingoa de Iapam (Vocabulário da Língua do Japão in modern Portuguese; "Vocabulary of the Language of Japan" in English) is a Japanese-to-Portuguese dictionary compiled by Jesuit missionaries and published in Nagasaki, Japan, in 1603. Containing entries for 32,293 Japanese words with explanations in Portuguese, it was the first dictionary of Japanese to a European language. The original publication uses the Latin alphabet exclusively, without Japanese characters (i.e. kanji or kana).

Facsimile editions were published in Japan in 1960 by Iwanami Shoten and again in 1973 and 1975 by Benseisha. The Benseisha reproduction is generally considered the clearer and more legible. A 1630 translation into Spanish published in Manila by the Dominican friars of the University of Santo Tomas, an 1869 translation into French, and a 1980 translation into Japanese (by Iwanami Shoten) also exist. As of 2023, a translation into English by Jeroen Lamers was in the works.

== Compilation ==
The Society of Jesus (commonly known as the Jesuits), with the cooperation of Japanese people, compiled the dictionary over several years. They intended it to serve the need of missionaries for language study and research. The Portuguese priest João Rodrigues is supposed to have been the main organizer of the project and its editor: having already published works like Arte da Lingoa de Iapam (Arte da Língua do Japão in modern Portuguese; "Art of the Language of Japan" in English) and Arte breue da lingoa Iapoa (Arte breve da Língua Japonesa in modern Portuguese; "Brief Art of the Japanese Language" in English) explaining the Japanese language for missionaries, he was known among the Portuguese community as having the highest proficiency in Japanese.

== Structure ==
The approximately 32,000 entries are arranged alphabetically. Each word is displayed in the Latin alphabet according to Portuguese conventions of the late sixteenth century, and explained in Portuguese.

The dictionary's primary purpose was to teach missionaries spoken Japanese. As needed, the authors identify such things as regional dialect, written and spoken forms, women's and children's language, elegant and vulgar words, and Buddhist vocabulary. Many of these words had never been written in any known text before the Nippo Jisho was published, and the system of romanization used by the Nippo Jisho reflects the phonetics of 16th-century Japanese (Late Middle Japanese), which differs from modern Japanese: this furnishes present-day linguists valuable insight into the Japanese language of the Sengoku period of Japanese history and how it has evolved into its modern form. The dictionary also yields information on rhyming words, individual pronunciation, meaning, usage, names of plants and animals, popular phrases, and customs of the times.

Because this dictionary contains the earliest known written example of many words, Japanese language dictionaries often cite it as a primary source, such as the 14-volume Nihon Kokugo Daijiten (Japanese: 日本国語大辞典), known in English as "Shogakukan's Japanese Dictionary", published by Shogakukan.

== Examples ==
The creators of the Nippo Jisho devised a system of transcription for the 16th-century Japanese language with contemporary Portuguese Roman letters. Take the following example from Michael Cooper's review of the Jisho in the journal Monumenta Nipponica in 1976.

Regional differences between Kyūshū and Kyoto speech are often noted, with preference given to the latter. "Qinchacu." (modern kinchaku 巾着) A purse carried in the sash. In Ximo (Shimo, present-day Kyūshū) it is called "Fōzō" (modern hōzō 宝蔵).

In this example the syllable modernly romanized as ki (き) was transcribed 'qi', ku (く) as 'cu', and the modern syllable group ha, hi, fu, he and ho (はひふへほ) were transcribed 'fa', 'fi', 'fu', 'fe', and 'fo' respectively. Also the syllable o (を) was written 'vo', tsu (つ) was 'tçu', shi (し) was 'xi', and e (え) was sometimes 'ye'. To what extent these particular spellings reflect how Japanese was actually pronounced in the 16th century is of great interest to scholars of Japanese historical linguistics.

Other examples:

- The name of the country, 日本, was written nifon, nippon, and jippon.
- The capital city, 京都 (present-day Kyoto), was written cami (probably pronounced "kami", lit. "upper") while Kyūshū was written as ximo (probably pronounced "shimo", lit. "lower").
- The term meaning "the first call of birds in spring" was spelled fatçu coye (modern "hatsu koe" 初声).
- Spring warbler was spelled faru uguysu (modern "haru uguisu" 春鶯).
- The word 侍 (samurai) referred to a noble, whereas the word 武士 (bushi) referred to a warrior.
- The word 進退 (pronounced shintai in present-day Japanese) was listed as shindai; 抜群 (batsugun) was bakkun
- The word rorirori meant "unsettled from fright".

== Copies ==
Only four copies of the original 1603 edition still exist. Three of them are in Europe. One copy is located at the Bodleian Library, University of Oxford; one is at the Bibliothèque nationale de France in Paris (available online since 2013); and one is at the Public Library of Évora in Portugal. The fourth copy is located at the National Library of Brazil, and it belonged to the wife of Emperor Dom Pedro II, Teresa Cristina. (Note: In 2018, it was reported the fourth copy, from the National Library of Brazil, had been discovered that same year by researchers from the University of São Paulo; in a 1976 article, the existence of four copies was already affirmed.) In 2020, a facsimile edition of this copy was published.

== See also ==
- Arte da Lingoa de Iapam
- Rakuyōshū

== Bibliography ==
- Cooper, Michael (Winter 1976). "The Nippo Jisho". Monumenta Nipponica. 31 (4). doi:10.2307/2384310. JSTOR 2384310.
