= Michael Cooper (historian) =

American historian (1930–2018)

Michael John Cooper (1930 – 31 March 2018) was an American historian. Briefly a Jesuit himself, Cooper wrote extensively on 15th- and 16th-century encounters between Jesuit missionaries and Japan. He was editor of the journal Monumenta Nipponica in Tokyo for 26 years (1971–1996) and was also formerly a president of the Asiatic Society of Japan.

== Works ==
- They came to Japan: An Anthology of European Reports on Japan 1543–1640, University of California Press, 1965
- The Southern barbarians : the first Europeans in Japan, Tokyo; Palo Alto, Calif. : Kodansha International in cooperation with Sophia University, 1971
- This Island of Japon: Joao Rodrigues’s Account of 16th Century Japan, Kodansha International, 1973
- Rodrigues the Interpreter: An Early Jesuit in Japan and China, Weatherhill, 1974
- Exploring Kamakura : a guide for the curious traveler, Weatherhill, 1979
- Catalogue of rare books in the Library of the Japan Foundation, Office for the Japanese Studies Center, The Foundation, 1986.
- 'The Early Europeans and Tea', in Paul Varley and Kumakura Isao, eds., Tea in Japan: Essays on the History of Chanoyu, Honolulu: University of Hawaii Press, 1989
- 'Early Western-style Paintings in Japan', in John Breen and Mark Williams, eds., Japan and Christianity: Impacts and Responses, St Martin's Press, 1996
- The Japanese Mission to Europe, 1582–1590: The Journey of Four Samurai Boys through Portugal, Spain and Italy, Global Oriental, 2005.
