= Alessandro Valignano =

Italian Jesuit priest and missionary to Nagasaki

The Reverend Alessandro Valignano S.J.
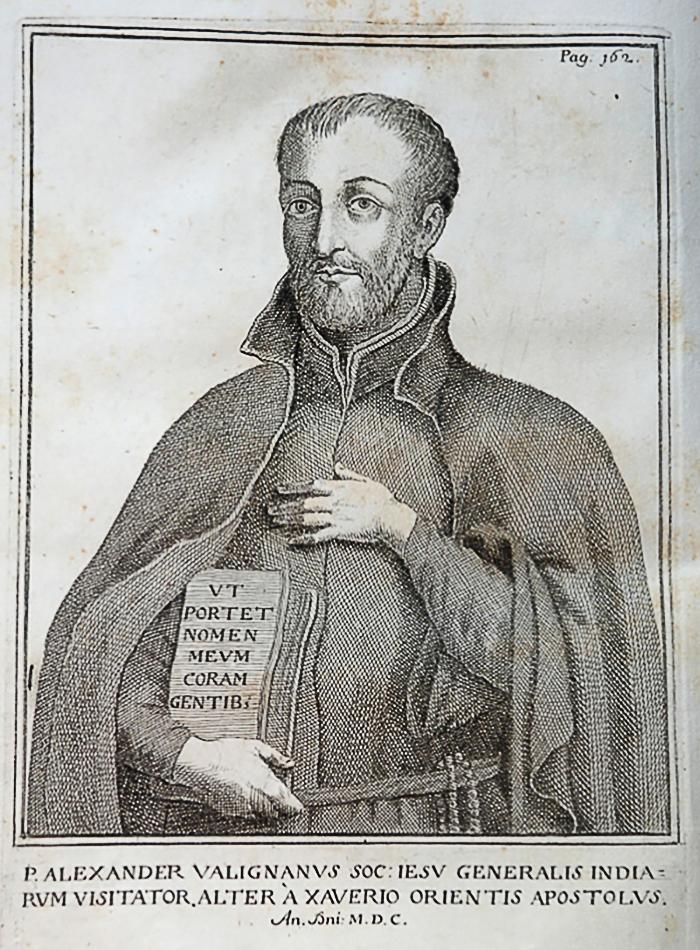
- c. 1599 portrait
- Church: Roman Catholic Church

Personal details
- Born: February 1539 Chieti, Kingdom of Naples
- Died: January 20, 1606 (aged 66) Macau, Portuguese Macau

Alessandro Valignano, S.J., sometimes Valignani (Chinese: 范禮安 Fàn Lǐ’ān; February 1539 – January 20, 1606), was an Italian Jesuit priest and missionary born in Chieti, part of the Kingdom of Naples, who helped supervise the introduction of Catholicism to the Far East, and especially to Japan.

== Education and commission ==
Valignano was born in Chieti, then part of the Kingdom of Naples, son of a Neapolitan aristocrat and friend of Pope Paul IV.

He excelled as a student at the University of Padua, where he first obtained his doctorate in law at the age of 19. After several years in Rome, he returned to Padua in 1562 to study Christian theology. After spending a year in jail, he returned to Rome in 1566 where he was admitted to the Society of Jesus. Valignano's insights into the Christian message convinced many within the Church that he was the perfect individual to carry the spirit of the Counter-Reformation to the Far East. He was ordained in the Society of Jesus and in 1573, at the age of 34, he was appointed Visitor of Missions in the Indies. He made his profession of the fourth vow after only seven years in the Society.

== India, Macau and China ==
In spring of 1574, Valignano sailed for Goa as the newly appointed Visitor to the Province of India. and the next year called the first Congregation of the Indian province, on Chorão near Goa. The nomination of a Neapolitan to supervise Portugal-dominated Asia was controversial, and his nationality led to conflicts with mission personnel, as would later his adaptationist and expansionist policies.

As Visitor, it was his responsibility to examine and whenever necessary reorganize mission structures and methods throughout India, China, and Japan. He was given an enormous amount of leeway and discretion, especially for someone so young, and was answerable only to the Jesuit Superior General in Rome. His unusual height was enough to "turn heads in Europe and to draw crowds in Japan". Father Luís Fróis wrote that crowds of Japanese would gather to see them, impressed by the height of Valignano and the dark skin color of Yasuke, Valignano's valet of sub-Saharan African origin. Valignano formed a basic strategy for Catholic proselytism, which is usually called "adaptationism". He put the advance of Jesuits' influence above adherence to traditional Christian behavior. He attempted to avoid cultural frictions by making a compromise with local customs that other missionaries viewed as conflicting with Catholic values. His strategy was in contrast to those of mendicant orders including Franciscans and Dominicans, whom Valignano worked hard to block from entering Japan. (See Chinese Rites controversy).

Soon after Valignano arrived in Portuguese Macau in September 1578, he realized that no missionary stationed in Macau had succeeded in establishing himself in mainland China. In his view, to improve the Jesuits' penetration rate into the country and their success at converting the locals, it was necessary first to learn to speak, read, and write the Chinese language. To this end, he wrote to the order's Superior in India, asking him to send to Macau a person who would be equal to the task, namely Bernardino de Ferraris (1537–1584). However, as de Ferraris was busy as the new rector of the Jesuits at Cochin, another Jesuit scholar, Michele Ruggieri, was sent to Macau.

Valignano left Macau for Japan in July 1579, leaving behind instructions for Ruggieri, who was to arrive within days. Once Ruggieri started studying Chinese and realized the immensity of the task, he wrote to Valignano, asking him to send Matteo Ricci to Macau as well, to share the work. Forwarded by Valignano to the Order's Superior in India in 1580, Ruggieri's request was fulfilled, and Ricci joined him in Macau 7 August 1582. Together, the two were to become the first European scholars of China and the Chinese language.

Valignano sought to establish a program in Macau for the training of Japanese Jesuits, in a place where they would be safe from the Japanese persecutions of Catholics. He first proposed this plan in 1592 at a General Consultation of Missionaries in Nagasaki. In 1594 Valignano founded St. Paul's College in Macau.

== Japan ==
Valignano exercised his position as Visitor by overseeing all of the Jesuit missions in Asia from the major Portuguese port of Macau. He had a particular focus on Japan, however, and made three extended visits there in 1579–1583, 1590–1592 and 1598–1603.

During his first visit in 1579, he wrote Il Cerimoniale per i Missionari del Giappone to set forth guidelines for Jesuits. In the writing, he mapped Jesuit hierarchy to that of Zen Buddhists even though he detested them. He claimed that, in order not to be despised by the Japanese, every Jesuit should behave according to the class to which he belonged. As a result, Jesuit fathers served daimyōs sumptuous dishes and walked around Nagasaki with armed Japanese servants.

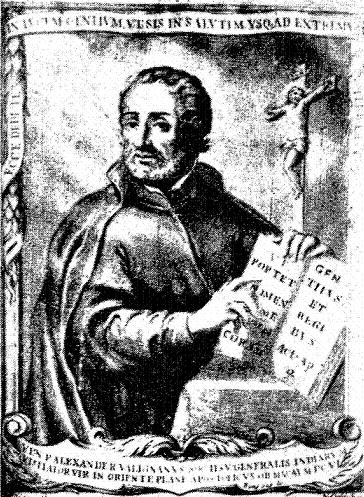
Alessandro Valignano

Such a luxurious life and authoritarian attitudes among Jesuits in Japan were criticized not only by rival mendicant orders but also by some Jesuits. In addition, his detailed instructions on customs and manners suggest that his understanding of Japanese culture was only superficial.

As was ordered by the Superior General, he devoted efforts to nurturing Japanese priests. He forced Francisco Cabral to resign as Superior of the Jesuit mission in Japan since Cabral opposed his plans. But it was not only Cabral who disagreed with Valignano. In fact, Valignano remained in a minority within the Jesuits in Japan. Valignano was optimistic about training of native priests, but many Jesuits doubted the sincerity of Japanese converts. Valignano himself came to hold a negative view after his second visit in Japan—although he did not give up his hope. After Valignano's death, negative reports from Japan were reflected in the policies of the headquarters of the Society of Jesus in Rome in 1610s, and the society heavily restricted admission and ordination of Japanese Catholics. Ironically, persecution by the Tokugawa shogunate forced Jesuits to rely increasingly on Japanese believers. In spite of the headquarter's policies, the Jesuit college in Macau, which was founded by Valignano, produced a dozen Japanese priests.

On his first arrival in Japan, Valignano was horrified by what he considered to be, at the least, negligent, and at the worst, abusive and un-Christian practices on the part of mission personnel.

Valignano later wrote that, although the mission had made some major gains during Francisco Cabral's tenure, the general methods used by the Superior were severely lacking. In addition to the problems of Japanese language study and racism, some of the Jesuits, and specifically Cabral were in the habit "to regard Japanese customs invariably as abnormal and to speak disparagingly of them. When I first came to Japan, ours (the crowd usually follows the leader), showed no care to learn Japanese customs, but at recreation and on other occasions were continually carping on them, arguing against them, and expressing their preference for our own ways to the great chagrin and disgust of the Japanese."

There is an implicit belief in the Visitor's writing that leaders influence and are responsible for the behavior of those of lesser rank. Thus, in Valignano's view, any lapse in the mission's behavior towards the Japanese was surely a result of Cabral's heavyhandedness. He immediately began to reform many aspects of the mission, and wherever possible, undermined Cabral's authority as Superior of the Jesuit mission to Japan.

=== Language study ===
Language study had always been one of the core problems for the mission. Before the Visitor arrived in Japan, seventeen of Valignano's personally appointed missionaries wrote to him complaining that language training was totally nonexistent. Cabral had protested that it was impossible for Europeans to learn Japanese and that even after fifteen years of study the padres could hardly preach a sermon, even to Christian converts.

It was Valignano's first official act upon arriving in Japan that all new missionaries in the province spend two years in a language course, separating these newcomers by leaps and bounds from the first enthusiastic but stilted efforts of Francis Xavier. By 1595, Valignano could boast in a letter that not only had the Jesuits printed a Japanese grammar and dictionary, but also several books (mostly the lives of saints and martyrs) entirely in Japanese. The main body of the grammar and dictionary was compiled from 1590 to 1603; when finished, it was a truly comprehensive volume with the dictionary alone containing some 32,798 entries.

Where Cabral had worked to exclude Japanese men from rising beyond brothers in the Society, Valignano insisted that they be treated equally in every way to Europeans and while the Japanese seminarians would learn Latin for sacramental use, the Visitor remarks that it is Europeans who must learn Japanese customs, and not the other way around. This, it must be added, was the complete opposite of Cabral's stated opinion that the Japanese must be adapted to Western ideas and modes of thought.

=== Establishment of the seminaries ===
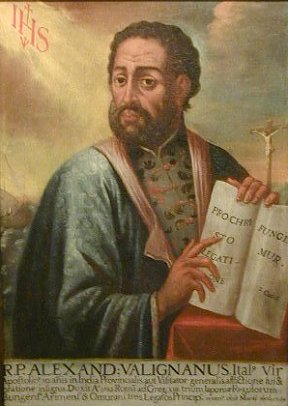
Alessandro Valignano.

The need for a trained native clergy was obvious to Valignano, and so, in 1580, a recently emptied Buddhist monastery in Arima province was converted into a nascent seminary. There, 22 young Japanese converts began receiving instructions towards holy orders. The process was repeated two years later at Azuchi, where the seminarians numbered 33.

The first order of business in the seminaries would be language training. Valignano made clear that all seminarians, whatever their background, would receive education in both Latin and Japanese. After the foundations were laid, the students were educated in moral theology, philosophy and Christian doctrine. This was typical of Jesuit education, and reflects the state of Jesuit schooling in Europe. But there were some significant differences. For one, as the Arima seminary was a converted Buddhist monastery, and because Valignano emphasized the need for cultural adaptation, the original décor was left largely unchanged. This pattern was repeated in other seminaries at other sites, and, in the 1580 Principles for the Administration of Japanese Seminaries, which goes into great detail about seminary methods, Valignano notes that the "tatami mats should be changed every year" and that students should wear "katabira (summer clothes) or kimonos of blue cotton" and outdoors a "dobuku (black cloak)." The students were instructed to eat white rice with sauce with a side dish of fish.

Valignano's purpose is quite clear. The seminaries were typical Jesuit institutions of humanistic education and theological exploration but their style of living was wholly Japanese. They were carefully designed to blend, as much as possible, Japanese sensibilities with European ideology. In short, they were a perfect place to train Japanese preachers, men who would appeal to both their families and friends, and also to the Society. Some experts hypothesize that Valignano was actively trying to replicate the Japanese institution of dojuku, or novitiate monastics. This is probably an apt interpretation, because it does appear that the Catholic seminaries appealed to, but in typical Jesuit style were not limited to, many of the same sons of wealthy nobles as the Buddhist tradition of living as a novice in a monastery would have.

Valignano's methodical and organized mind is apparent in every aspect of mission organization. Appended to his "Principles for the Administration of Japanese Seminaries" is a complete daily schedule for a Japanese seminarian. The scheduled activities include both daily Latin and Japanese instruction, with some choral and other musical performance.

=== Success of seminary reforms ===
Despite their great idealism, it is unclear how successful Valignano's seminary reforms really were. They certainly stimulated Japanese converts to join the Society; in the decade after Valignano's first visit, some sixty native Japanese joined the Jesuits as novices. But there were problems too. Few Buddhist monks were forced to live under a rule of strict poverty as the Jesuits enforced it, and because gift-giving was such an important part of Japanese social relations, the inability of the novices to accept these gifts undoubtedly helped to alienate them from their families.

In addition, the Ignatian mode of spirituality, with its emphasis on confession and examination of conscience was new for them. Valignano, Cabral, and others had often noted how Japanese culture stressed the suppression and concealment of emotion. This problem was exacerbated by the inability of most of the Jesuits to fluently speak or understand the language. Revealing all of one's secret thoughts to another, through an interpreter, was seen as a serious violation of social customs.

Lastly, but even more fundamentally, Japanese culture did not and does not view religious life as totally separate from secular life. Within most Buddhist communities it is common, if not expected, that young men and women spend some time in seclusion as a monk or nun for a few years or months. It was no dishonor for a monk to take vows for a limited period of time and then return to his normal occupation.

=== Port of Nagasaki ===
As the scale of the mission began to expand rapidly, financial difficulties began to crop up. All of the Jesuit institutions: the seminaries, the schools, the printing presses and the missions required money to finance. This eternal conflict, which Valignano describes as the one between "God and Mammon" raged for most of the history of the mission.

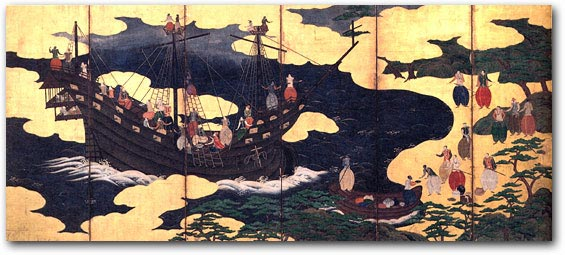
"Arrival of the Southern Barbarians", 17th century folding screen, Nagasaki

Originally local Japanese daimyo had tried to curry favor with the Jesuit administration in order to have the Portuguese trading ships visit their local ports more frequently. All of this changed in 1580, following the conversion of the daimyō Ōmura Sumitada, who controlled the port of Nagasaki. He ceded the port, then merely a small fishing village, to the Society, along with the fortress in its harbor.

The Superior General in Rome was shocked by the news of such a blatant acquisition of property and gave firm instructions that Jesuit control of Nagasaki should only be temporary. But like most suggestions coming from Europe, Cabral and Valignano chose to tactfully ignore them, especially because, as Valignano explained later, the town quickly became a haven for displaced and persecuted Christians.

Under Jesuit control, Nagasaki grew from a town with only one street to an international port rivaling the influence of Goa or Macau. Jesuit ownership of the Port of Nagasaki gave the Society a concrete monopoly in taxation over all imported goods coming into Japan. The society was most active in the Japanese silver trade, wherein large quantities of Japanese silver were shipped to Canton in exchange for Chinese silk; but the superiors of the mission were aware of the inherent distastefulness of Society involvement in mercantile transactions and resolved to keep the traffic to a minimum.

=== Embassy to Europe ===
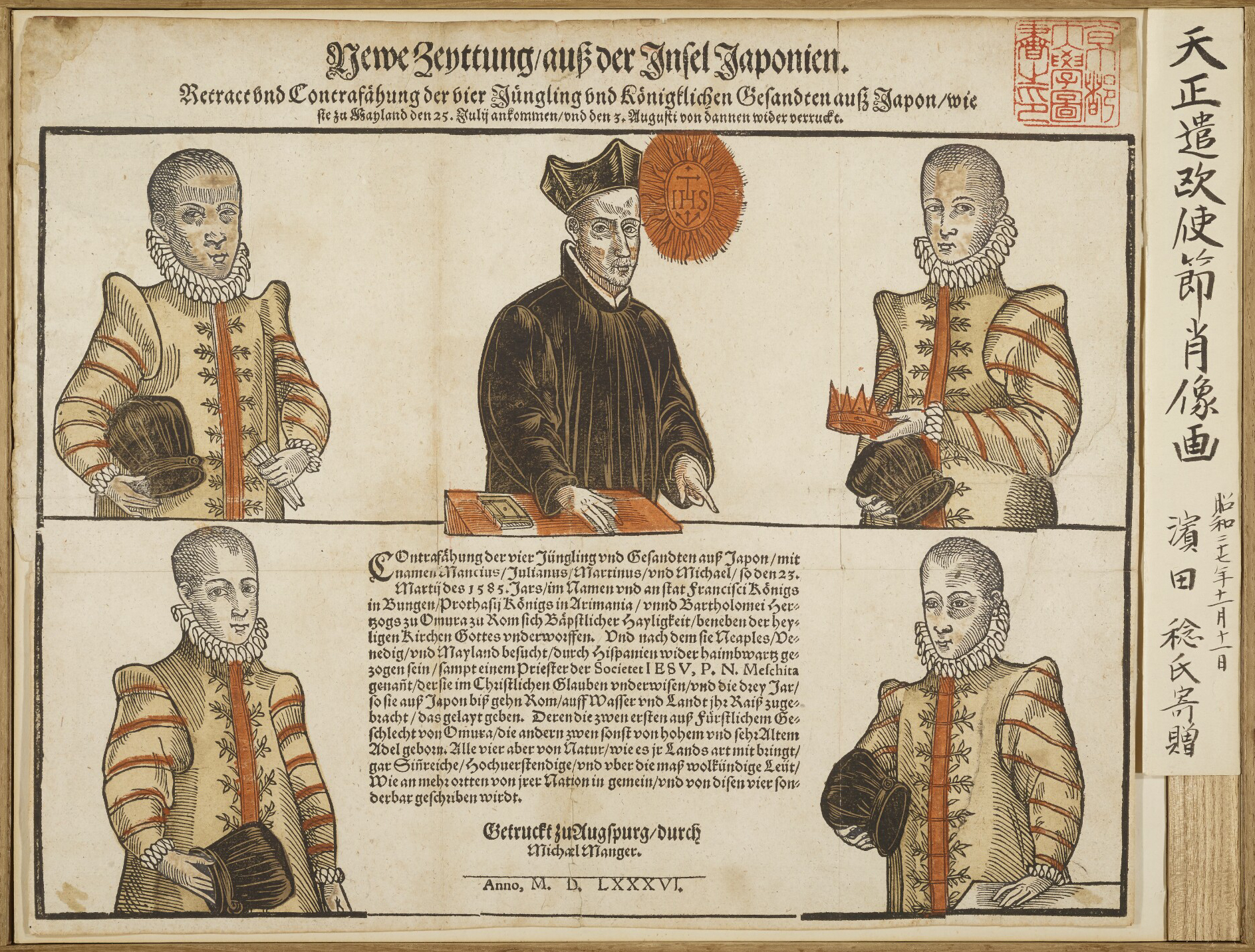
The four Japanese sent by Alessandro Valignano to Europe, with Father Mesquita, in 1586.

Valignano was the initiator of the Tenshō embassy, the first official Japanese delegation to Europe, and accompanied the group of Japanese converts led by Mancio Ito from Nagasaki to Goa, from where he then returned to Macau. The delegation would sail on to Lisbon and spend several years in Europe where they were received with honors in Portugal, Spain, Florence, Rome, Venice and Milan.

=== Conflicts with Rome and the Shogunate ===
This breach of ecclesiastical practice did not go unnoticed by the heads of other European missions in the area, or by those who made their living via inter-Asiatic trade. Eventually, the Pope was forced to intervene, and, in 1585, the Holy See ordered an immediate cessation of all mercantile activities by the Society. Valignano made an impassioned appeal to the Pope, saying that he would forgo all trade as soon as the 12,000 ducats required to meet their annual expenses were forthcoming from another source. Abandoning the silk trade, he said, would be the equivalent to abandoning the mission to Japan, which was undoubtedly true. In a letter to the Superior General, Valignano asked for leniency and above all, trust: "Your paternity must leave this matter to my conscience, because with the help of God I trust that I shall continue to think about it, and also to consider the good name of the society in Japan and China, and when it seems to me possible to do so I shall gradually reduce and finally abandon the trade."

But sufficient finances had to be secured from somewhere. By 1580, the society was maintaining a community of 150,000 people, 200 churches staffed with 85 Jesuits, including twenty Japanese brothers and an additional 100 acolytes. A decade later, there were 136 Jesuits in Japan with a caretaking staff of up to 300. At the height of the mission, there were about 600 people who were entirely dependent on the society for funds. All of this, in addition to the construction and maintenance of churches, schools, seminaries, and the printing press cost a great deal of money. Placed in the context of the widespread poverty that plagued Japan during this era, it is not surprising that the Valignano authorized the mission to rely on the tax income provided them by the Port of Nagasaki.

By 1600, the Jesuit mission there was in decline because of persecution from the ruler Toyotomi Hideyoshi and later, most severely, under the Tokugawas. Tokugawa Ieyasu worked diligently to thwart all European attempts to reestablish contact with Japan, religious or otherwise, after his rise to power in 1603. All samurai and members of the army were required to forswear Christianity and remove Christian emblems or designs from their clothing. Later, daimyo and commoners were ordered to follow the same restrictions. In 1636, Tokugawa Iemitsu enacted the Sakoku edict which ended almost all contact with the outside world. No Japanese ships were allowed to leave the country under pain of death, and any Japanese who attempted to return from abroad would likewise be executed, policies which remained in force until American Commodore Matthew C. Perry's arrival in 1853.

== Death and legacy ==
Valignano died in Macau on 20 January 1606. He was buried at St. Paul's College.

One of his Jesuit admirers noted in his Panegyric: "In [God] we lament not only our former visitor and father, but, as some would have it, the apostle of Japan." Valignano paved the way for a closer relationship between Asian and European peoples by advocating equal treatment of all human beings. He was a great admirer of the Japanese people and envisioned a future when Japan would be one of the leading Christian countries in the world. He memorably wrote that the Japanese "excel not only all the other Oriental peoples, they surpass the Europeans as well". Jesuit historian Thomas J. Campbell called him "the greatest man of the [Jesuit] missions in the East after Francis Xavier." Ludwig von Pastor considered him the chief architect of the spread of Catholicism in 16th century Japan.

== See also ==
- Francis Xavier
- Matteo Ricci
- Nanban period
- Chinese Rites controversy
- Yasuke, sub-Saharan African man in service of Valignano who became an armed retainer of Oda Nobunaga
