= Francesco Sambiasi =

CATHOLIC MISSIONARY

Francesco Sambiasi (1582 in Cosenza, Calabria, Italy – January 1649 in Guangzhou, China), known as Bi Fangji (畢方濟) in Chinese, was a Catholic missionary to China, part of the Jesuit missions there. He was sent with the boat Nossa Senhora da Piedade to the East on 23 March 1609 and arrived in Macau in 1610. He worked in various places during his mission in China: Beijing (1613–1616), Jiading and then Shanghai (1622), a stint in Korea, then to Kaifeng (1628), Shanxi, Shandong, Nanjing (1631–1643) and then to Macau ("patente de Embaixador", 1645).

In the summer of 1645, he was appointed as the ambassador to Macau by the Southern Ming Hongguang Emperor, and was sent to petition for military aid from the Portuguese colony there.

In 1646, he worked for the Yongli Emperor as a "folk master" and the year after as a mandarin.

During his time in Nanjing, at the efforts of Xu Guangqi, Sambiasi was appointed to the Imperial Astronomical Bureau. In this role, he was made responsible for the correction of the calendar and the observation of eclipses.

== See also ==
- List of Catholic missionaries to China
