= Michele Ruggieri =

Italian Jesuit priest and sinologist (1543–1607)

Personal life
- Born: Pompilio Ruggieri; 1543 Spinazzola, Kingdom of Naples
- Died: 11 May 1607 (aged 63–64) Naples, Kingdom of Naples
- Other name: Luo Mingjian

Religious life
- Religion: Catholic Church
- Order: Society of Jesus

Chinese name

Luo Mingjian
- Traditional Chinese: 羅明堅
- Simplified Chinese: 罗明坚
Transcriptions
Standard Mandarin
- Hanyu Pinyin: Luó Míngjiān
- Wade–Giles: Lo Ming-chien

Michele Ruggieri, SJ (born Pompilio Ruggieri and known in China as Luo Mingjian; 1543 – 11 May 1607) was an Italian Jesuit priest and missionary. A founding father of the Jesuit China missions, co-author of the first European–Chinese dictionary, and first European translator of the Four Books of Confucianism, he has been described as the first European sinologist.

== Life ==
=== Early life ===
Pompilio Ruggieri was born in Spinazzola, Apulia, then part of the Kingdom of Naples, in 1543. He obtained a doctorate in civil and canon law at the University of Naples and was employed in the administration of Philip I. He entered the Society of Jesus in Rome on 27 October 1572 taking the name "Michele". After completing the Jesuit usual spiritual and intellectual formation, Ruggieri volunteered for the Asian missions and left for Lisbon, where he was ordained in March 1578 while waiting for a ship to take him to Goa.

=== Missionary work ===
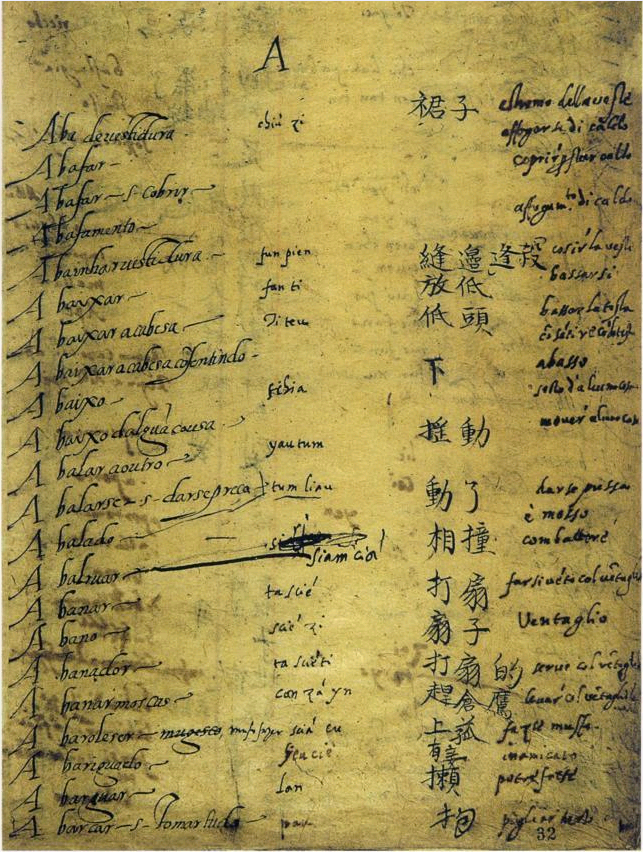
A page from the manuscript Portuguese-Chinese dictionary created by Ruggieri, Ricci, and Fernandez (between 1583–88)

Ruggieri left Europe with a group of missionaries which included Rudolph Acquaviva and Matteo Ricci. Arriving in India (September 1578), he promptly started to study the language used on the Malabar coast and in 6 months reached such proficiency that he could hear confession. It is probably this gift for language that made him an ideal choice for the beginning of the Chinese mission.

Ruggieri was assigned to Macau to study the Chinese language and customs, arriving 20 July 1579. He landed at the Portuguese trade centre and started at once to learn to read and write Chinese. In the process, and aware that several would be following him, he set up Shengma'erding Jingyuan ("St Martin House"), the first school for teaching Chinese to foreigners.

Ruggieri's and Ricci's intent was to settle somewhere in "real" China – not just Macao, and to that end Ruggieri made trips to Canton (Guangzhou) and Zhaoqing (the residence of the Governor General of Guangdong and Guangxi), making useful contacts with the local authorities. He is one of the first Christian missionaries to have entered Ming Dynasty Mainland China. After several failed attempts to obtain permission to establish a permanent mission within China, such a permission was finally obtained in 1582, and in 1583 Ricci and Ruggieri finally settled in Zhaoqing, the first stage on the Jesuits' "long ascent" to Beijing.

In 1584 Ruggieri published the first Chinese catechism. Visiting villages in the region he baptized several families that formed the nucleus of further Christian communities in mainland China.

During 1583–88, Michele Ruggieri, with Matteo Ricci as co-author, created a Portuguese-Chinese dictionary – the first ever European-Chinese dictionary, for which they developed a consistent system for transcribing Chinese words in Latin alphabet. The dictionary's Romanisation was Ruggieri's. A Chinese Jesuit Lay Brother Sebastiano Fernandez, who had grown up and been trained in Macau, assisted in this work. The manuscript was misplaced in the Jesuit Archives in Rome, and re-discovered only in 1934, by Pasquale d'Elia. This dictionary was finally published in 2001. To Ruggieri is attributed one of the first collections of handwritten maps of China, translated into Latin from Chinese sources (atlases and maps), dating back to 1606, or nearly fifty years before the manuscript maps of the Polish Jesuit Michael Boym and the Novus Atlas Sinensis of the Trentino Jesuit Martino Martini (printed by the publisher Johan Blaeu in Amsterdam in 1655 and immediately translated into several languages). The manuscript is now preserved in the State Archives of Rome, ms. 493.

Ruggieri was accused by Cai Yilong (w Ts‘ai I-lung) of adultery with the wife of Lo Hung in October 1587. After trial, the judge ordered Cai to be severely punished, to the point he died of his wounds.

=== Return to Europe ===
In November 1588, Ruggieri left China for Rome in order to get the pope to send an embassy to the Wanli Emperor. This plan had been proposed as a means to allow Jesuits to reach Beijing and to be received by the emperor. But nothing became of it, the frequent death of Roman Pontiffs, and the deterioration of his own health, preceded the weary Jesuit's retirement to Salerno, where he died in 1607 without ever going to China again.

In Salerno, the retired Jesuit carried on intellectual work that would make China better known in Europe. He completed the Latin translation of the Four Books (the classic Chinese introduction to Confucius’ philosophy), wrote poetry in Chinese, and circulated copies of Chinese maps he had brought along with him from Zhaoqing. Ruggieri was also a much sought after spiritual guide and confessor in the school of Salerno. He died on 11 May 1607.
