= List of rulers of Japan =

The rulers of Japan have been its Emperors, whether effectively or nominally, for its entire recorded history. These include the ancient legendary emperors, the attested but undated emperors of the Yamato period (early fifth to early 6th centuries), and the clearly dated emperors of 539 to the present. Political power was held in various eras by regents and shōguns, and since 1946 has been exercised exclusively by the Prime Minister as leader of a representative government.

Period	Nominal rulers	Effective powers	c
Foundation–Heian period	Emperors, 660 BC (traditional)–present	Emperors; Soga clan, 530s–645 Fujiwara clan, 850s–1070 Minamoto clan, 960s–1192 Taira clan, 1160s–1185	Nara; Kyoto
Kamakura period	Emperors, 660 BC (traditional)–present	Minamoto no Yoritomo, 1147–1199 Kamakura shōguns (successors of Minamoto clan), 1192–1333; Regents of Kamakura shogunate, 1203–1333	Kamakura; Kyoto
Kenmu Restoration	Emperors, 660 BC (traditional)–present	Emperor Go-Daigo (descendant of Minamoto clan), 1333–1336; Ashikaga Takauji (descendant of Minamoto clan), 1333–1336	Kyoto
Muromachi period	Emperors, 660 BC (traditional)–present	Ashikaga shōguns (successors of Kamakura shōguns), 1338–1568 (1573); Northern Court Emperors, 1336–1392; Sakai Kubō (Hosokawa and Miyoshi clan), 1527–1532; Regional daimyōs, during Sengoku period	Kyoto
Azuchi–Momoyama period	Emperors, 660 BC (traditional)–present	Oda Nobunaga, 1568–1582; Toyotomi Hideyoshi, 1582–1598; Five Commissioners, 1585–1600; Council of Five Elders, 1598–1600	Azuchi; Kyoto; Osaka
Edo period	Emperors, 660 BC (traditional)–present	Tokugawa shōguns (descendants of Minamoto clan), 1603–1867; Tairō of Tokugawa shogunate, 1636–1865	Edo (Tokyo)
After Meiji restoration	Emperors, 660 BC (traditional)–present	Emperors, 1867–1947; Kido Takayoshi, 1867–1877; Saigō Takamori, 1867–1873; Ōkubo Toshimichi, 1867–1878; Prime Ministers, 1885–present Supreme Commander of the Allied Powers, 1945–1952	Tokyo

== See also ==
- Sessho and Kampaku
- History of Japan
- Lists of incumbents
