= List of One-Punch Man chapters =

One-Punch Man is a Japanese manga series written by One and illustrated by Yusuke Murata. One began publishing One-Punch Man as a webcomic in 2009. When the series became popular, receiving 7.9 million hits by June 2012, Yusuke Murata contacted One and proposed redrawing the comic for digital publication in Weekly Young Jump's spin-off manga website, Tonari no Young Jump (となりのヤングジャンプ, Tonari no Yangu Janpu), published by Shueisha. The first chapter was published on June 14, 2012.

As of November 2026, the manga remake has released 248 chapters.

The series began publication in Viz Media's Weekly Shonen Jump (Shonen Jump Alpha at the time) in North America on January 21, 2013. The first digital volume was released in February 2014. One-Punch Man was one of a number of series that Viz made available on ComiXology in June 2014. The manga was released in print in the United States starting in September 2015.

As of September 2026, the manga series has been collected into 37 tankōbon volumes, 34 of which have been published in English.

== Volumes ==
Individual chapters of the series are referred to as "Punches"; for example, Chapter 37 is titled "Punch 37". Bonus manga are added after the chapter list. However, bonus manga that are not included in the volumes' table of contents are also not listed in this index.

No.	Title	Original release date	English release date
01	One Punch; Ichigeki (一撃)	December 4, 2012; 978-4-08-870701-3	September 1, 2015; 978-1-4215-8564-2
1. "One Punch" (一撃, Ichigeki); 2. "Crab and Job Hunting" (蟹と就活, Kani to Shūkatsu); 3. "Walking Disaster" (災害存在, Saigai Sonzai); 4. "Subterraneans of Darkness" (闇の地底人, Yami no Chiteijin); 5. "Itch Explosion" (かゆさ爆発, Kayusa Bakuhatsu); 6. "Saitama" (サイタマ, Saitama); 7. "A Mysterious Attack" (謎の襲撃, Nazo no Shūgeki); 8. "This Guy?" (それコイツ, Sore Koitsu); Bonus Manga: "200 Yen" (200円, 200 En)
A villain named Vaccine Man destroys a city and is about to kill a girl when Saitama, a bald superhero, intervenes and kills Vaccine Man with a single punch. However, Saitama has grown bored with life since he can defeat any opponent so easily. He recalls an event from three years ago that led him to become a hero—after a failed job interview, he rescued a boy from a crab monster called Crablante, which inspired him to start training. In the present, Saitama defeats a pair of brothers, one of whom has mutated into a giant. Later, he dreams of finally facing powerful subterranean monsters who give him an exciting battle, only to wake up and find that the real ones are incredibly weak. Meanwhile, a villain named Mosquito Girl attacks a city with her swarm of mosquitoes, but a cyborg named Genos arrives to stop her. Mosquito Girl powers up and severely damages Genos. Just before he can self-destruct, Saitama, who had been chasing a mosquito, effortlessly defeats her with a single slap. Impressed, Genos asks Saitama to become his mentor. Soon after, a group of villains from the House of Evolution launches an attack. Bonus: The bonus manga chapter follows a 12-year-old Saitama in middle school as he deals with bullies and a piggy bank monster that steals his 200 yen.
02	The Secret to Strength; Tsuyosa no Hiketsu (強さの秘訣)	December 4, 2012; 978-4-08-870702-0	September 1, 2015; 978-1-4215-8565-9
9. "House of Evolution" (進化の家, Shinka no Ie); 10. "Modern Art" (現代アート, Gendai Āto); 11. "The Secret to Strength" (強さの秘訣, Tsuyosa no Hiketsu); 12. "The Paradisers" (桃源団, Tōgen-dan); 13. "Speed" (スピード, Supīdo); 14. "I Don't Know You" (お前など知らん, Omae Nado Shiran); 15. "Fun and Work" (趣味と仕事, Shumi to Shigoto); Bonus Manga: "Brushing Up" (じぶんみがき, Jibun Migaki)
Armored Gorilla reveals the origins of the House of Evolution, created by Doctor Genus, and provides the location of their headquarters. Saitama and Genos confront the organization's strongest warrior, Carnage Kabuto. Kabuto easily overpowers Genos and then demands to know the secret behind Saitama's immense strength. Saitama casually explains his "intense" daily training regimen: 100 sit-ups, 100 push-ups, 100 squats, 10 km of running, a proper diet, and avoiding air conditioning or heating. Kabuto refuses to believe such a mundane routine could create such power and attacks—only to be instantly defeated. Meanwhile, Hammerhead and his gang, the Paradisers, rampage through the city in an attempt to destroy the mansion of the wealthy Zeniru, seeking to establish a utopia where people can live without working. Saitama initially ignores them but gets involved when he sees the news wrongly associating him with the Paradisers because of his bald head. Zeniru's elite bodyguard, Speed-o'-Sound Sonic, arrives and swiftly eliminates the entire Paradiser gang, except for Hammerhead, who miraculously survives. Hammerhead later encounters Saitama and attempts to recruit him—only for Saitama to destroy his battle suit with ease. Sonic mistakes Saitama for a Paradiser and attacks, but Saitama unintentionally incapacitates him with a well-placed strike to the groin. Realizing that his efforts as a hero remain unrecognized, Saitama decides to follow Genos's advice and enroll in the Hero Association to become an officially registered hero. Bonus: Saitama puts his 300 days of training to good use, performing some superheroic deeds.
03	The Rumor; Uwasa (噂)	April 4, 2013; 978-4-08-870724-2	November 3, 2015; 978-1-4215-6461-6
16. "I Passed" (合格しました, Gōkaku Shimashita); 17. "Sparring" (手合せ, Teawase); 18. "Pounding the Pavement" (営業活動, Eigyō Katsudō); 19. "No Time for This" (それどころじゃない, Sore dokoro janai); 20. "The Rumor" (噂, Uwasa); Bonus Manga 1: "Summer" (夏, Natsu); Bonus Manga 2: "A New Wind Blows" (吹き込む新風, Fukikomu Shinpū)
Saitama and Genos take the entrance exam for the Hero Association. While Genos achieves a perfect score and is placed in S-Class, Saitama scores poorly on the written test and essay, relegating him to C-Class. Snakebite Snek briefs them on their responsibilities as new heroes. Genos challenges Saitama to a sparring match, eager to gauge his strength. Though Genos fights seriously, Saitama effortlessly dominates the fight. Afterward, Genos moves into Saitama's apartment to train under him. Saitama soon realizes that C-Class heroes must complete at least one heroic act per week to maintain their rank. He frantically runs around the city searching for trouble but finds nothing. However, he attracts the attention of Tank-Top Tiger, who mistakes him for a villain. Before a fight can begin, Speed-o'-Sound Sonic arrives, defeats Tiger, and challenges Saitama. Saitama effortlessly knocks Sonic down, inadvertently securing his weekly heroic deed. Meanwhile, the Hero Association's A-Class headquarters analyzes reports from various cities, noticing that City Z is experiencing an unusual rise in villain activity. One such threat is Kombu Infinity, a powerful seaweed monster who attacks City Z and defeats A-Class heroes Spring Mustachio and Golden Ball. However, Saitama unknowingly eliminates Kombu Infinity when he goes grocery shopping, mistaking the monster's remains for ingredients. Bonus 1: A monstrous Cicada Nymph attacks three heroes, forcing them to retreat to a shelter. Inside, a younger Saitama (still with hair) desperately needs to use the restroom. Bonus 2: A B-Class hero from the Blizzard Bunch faces a powerful opponent in a fierce battle.
04	Giant Meteor; Kyodai Inseki (巨大隕石)	August 2, 2013; 978-4-08-870871-3	January 5, 2016; 978-1-4215-6920-8
21. "Giant Meteor" (巨大隕石, Kyodai Inseki); 22. "Voice" (声, Koe); 23. "Threat from the Sea" (海からの脅威, Umi kara no Kyōi); 24. "Deep Sea King" (深海王, Shinkaiō); Bonus Manga: "Purison" (ぷりズン, Purizun)
Genos and S-Class hero Bang are summoned to stop a giant meteor. They are joined by Metal Knight, who wants to test some new weapons. As none of them are able to stop it, Saitama arrives and shatters it into a bunch of fragments, which damage the city but prevent a worldwide catastrophe. Tank-top Tiger and Tank-Top Black Hole incite the townsfolk to blame Saitama for the destruction, but Saitama responds that he destroyed the meteor, and that's that. A group of sea monsters called the Clan of the Seafolk attack City J. Stinger is able to fend off the Clan until its leader, the Sea King, arrives and defeats him. The Sea King also defeats Lightning Max but then must face Puri-Puri Prisoner. Bonus: The bonus chapter follows Sonic's imprisonment, where he fends off some other prisoner thugs and then Puri-Puri Prisoner.
05	Shining in Tatters; Zutaboro ni Kagayaku (ズタボロに輝く)	December 4, 2013; 978-4-08-880083-7	March 1, 2016; 978-1-4215-6954-3
25. "Deep Sea King・2" (深海王・2, Shinkaiō・2); 26. "Unstable Hope" (不安定な希望, Fuantei na Kibō); 27. "Shining in Tatters" (ズタボロに輝く, Zutaboro ni Kagayaku); 28. "It's Raining, So" (雨降ってるから, Ame Futteru kara); 29. "Class B" (B級, B-Kyū); Bonus Manga: "What Can't Be Bought" (買えないモノ, Kaenai Mono)
Puri-Puri Prisoner tries to fight Deep Sea King but is defeated. Sonic also attempts to fight but realizes he needs a weapon and retreats. Deep Sea King then attacks an evacuation shelter filled with civilians, where only a handful of minor heroes, including Snakebite Snek, try to stall the monster until help arrives. Genos engages Deep Sea King but is ultimately defeated when he sacrifices himself to protect a girl from the monster's corrosive spit. Mumen Rider also bravely fights Deep Sea King but is quickly overpowered. Just as Mumen is about to be killed, Saitama arrives, saves him, and defeats Deep Sea King with a single punch. However, Saitama downplays his victory, crediting the other heroes for weakening the monster. He is promoted to Rank 1 in C-Class and applies to advance to B-Class. Bonus: D-Pad and Funeral Suspenders must take on a bank robber named Bull-Bull Man. When he attempts to escape with a hostage, Saitama steps in to stop him.
06	The Big Prediction; Daiyogen (大予言)	May 2, 2014; 978-4-08-880128-5	May 3, 2016; 978-1-4215-8527-7
30. "Class S" (S級, S-Kyū); 31. "The Big Prediction" (大予言, Daiyogen); 32. "From Outer Space" (宇宙(そら)からの..., Sora kara no...); 33. "Men Who Don't Listen" (話を聞かない男たち, Hanashi o Kikanai Otoko-tachi); 34. "Are You Stupid?" (馬鹿かお前, Baka ka Omae); Bonus Manga: "Salmon" (鮭(しゃけ), Shake)
The S-Class heroes and Saitama are summoned to City A, where it is revealed that Madame Shibabawa has died after predicting an impending catastrophe. Shortly after, a massive alien spacecraft arrives, destroying most of City A except for the Hero Association headquarters. As the heroes, including Atomic Samurai, Bang, Puri-Puri Prisoner, and Metal Bat, battle Melzargard, a shape-shifting alien with five heads, the others attempt to figure out how to reach the spaceship. Meanwhile, Saitama has already punched his way inside and quickly defeats Groribas. Melzargard continues to regenerate, making him difficult to defeat, until the heroes discover that each of his heads contains a hidden marble core, which must be destroyed. Meanwhile, Saitama confronts Lord Boros, the leader of the Dark Matter Thieves. Bonus: While eating lunch, Saitama encounters a suicidal worker.
07	The Fight; Tatakai (戦い)	December 4, 2014; 978-4-08-880262-6	July 5, 2016; 978-1-4215-8528-4
35. "The Fight" (戦い, Tatakai); 36. "Boros's True Strength" (ボロスの本領, Borosu no Honryō); 37. "Crash" (墜落, Tsuiraku); Bonus Manga 1: "Big Construction" (大工事, Daikōji); Bonus Manga 2: "A Top Pupil's Reminiscence" (一番弟子の回想, Ichiban Deshi no Kaisō); Bonus Manga 3: "Pork Cutlet Bowl" (カツ丼, Katsudon)
Tornado stops the shells and redirects them, causing massive damage to the alien ship. Melzargard is down to two heads. Although Melzargard strikes Bang, Atomic Samurai chops him up, and Bang crushes Melzargard's final marble essence, eliminating him. Boros boasts about his regenerative abilities and lands a powerful blow that sends Saitama to the moon. However, Saitama counters with consecutive normal punches. When Boros unleashes his ultimate attack, Saitama ends the battle with a single "Serious Strike" punch. The alien ship crashes into the already devastated A-City. Amai Mask criticizes the S-Class heroes for the destruction. Metal Knight arrives to salvage ship parts for weapon development. Tornado blames Saitama for acting recklessly, but Bang intervenes and tells them to stop. The Hero Association headquarters, which survived the attack, is reconstructed into a fortress. Bonus 1: A large robot approaches the headquarters, prompting hero deployment, but it turns out to be Metal Knight's reconstruction robots. Bonus 2: Charanko recalls how he became Bang's top disciple. Bonus 3: The police bring Saitama in for questioning, but after offering him a pork cutlet bowl, he defeats a monster that attacks the police station.
08	That Man; Ano Hito (あの人)	April 3, 2015; 978-4-08-880382-1	September 6, 2016; 978-1-4215-8656-4
38. "King" (キング, Kingu); 39. "That Man" (あの人, Ano Hito); 40. "Outlaw" (アウトロー, Autorō); Bonus Manga 1: "Lost Cat" (迷い猫, Mayoi Neko); Bonus Manga 2: "Lobster" (海老, Ebi)
The S-Class hero King walks into a city, unintentionally causing a monster to give up attacking a woman out of fear. However, King is actually there to buy a romance simulation video game. A robot named G4 challenges King, but he excuses himself, claiming he needs to use the restroom. It is revealed that he is not truly a superhero but a video game otaku who has survived numerous monster attacks only because others intervened, and he mistakenly received the credit. King flees to his apartment, where Saitama unexpectedly visits him. He confesses his secret to Saitama and learns that Saitama was the one who saved him the first time, back when his face was clawed. A bird monster suddenly attacks King's apartment, but Saitama effortlessly punches it away. Meanwhile, Genos battles and defeats G4, salvaging its parts to take to Dr. Kuseno for upgrades. At the same time, Sitch gathers a group of criminals, hoping to recruit potential heroes to combat the rising monster threats. While Sonic refuses and leaves, Garou seizes the opportunity to establish himself as the strongest villain by attacking the group. Bonus 1: Saitama helps a little girl find her lost cat, while Genos and other heroes pursue the monster Grizz-Meow. Bonus 2: Bang invites Saitama and Genos for hot pot, but a gang attempts to challenge his dojo and is swiftly defeated. Later, the defeated gang encounters Garou.
09	Don't Dis Heroes! Namen na! (なめんな!)	August 4, 2015; 978-4-08-880530-6	November 1, 2016; 978-1-4215-8657-1
41. "The Man Who Wanted to Be a Villain" (怪人になりたい男, Kaijin ni Naritai Otoko); 42. "The Blizzard Bunch" (フブキ組, Fubuki-Gumi); 43. "Don't Dis Heroes!" (なめんな!, Namen na!); 44. "Accelerate" (加速, Kasoku); 45. "Hero Name" (ヒーローネーム, Hīrō Nēmu); 46. "Hero Hunting" (ヒーロー狩り, Hīrō Gari); 47. "Technique" (技, Waza)
As a child, Garou always saw heroes winning on television, which led him to sympathize with villains. In the present, he defeats Sitch's bodyguards and several villains before leaving. Meanwhile, Sonic locates Saitama's apartment but is intercepted by Genos. At the same time, Blizzard and her subordinates, Eyelashes and Wild Monkey, attempt to recruit Saitama, but he refuses. Blizzard challenges him, but Saitama easily stops her, telling her that crushing weaker heroes is a pointless pursuit. Their fight is interrupted when Sonic and Genos engage in battle, impressing both Blizzard and her subordinates with their speed. However, Genos is ultimately defeated. Sonic then challenges Saitama, using his speed to create multiple afterimages of himself. Saitama counters effortlessly by creating even more afterimages, ultimately knocking Sonic down with a simple sidestep. Saitama explains to Blizzard that he believes in individual effort over teamwork, as teammates may not always be there to help when needed. Meanwhile, Sitch is frustrated that the Hero Association executives are more focused on assigning hero names to Genos and Saitama than addressing the growing threat of Garou. However, Bang takes the matter seriously and seeks out his brother, Bomb, to help deal with Garou. Elsewhere, Garou defeats Mumen Rider, Tank-Top Master, the entire Tank Top gang, and Charanko.
10	Pumped Up; Kiai (気合い)	December 4, 2015; 978-4-08-880577-1	January 3, 2017; 978-1-4215-9015-8
48. "Bananas" (バナナ, Banana); 49. "I've Got Free Time, So..." (どうせ暇だから, Dōse Hima dakara); 50. "Getting Cocky" (調子に乗る!, Chōshi ni noru!); 51. "Headgear" (被り物, Kaburimono); 52. "No Putting Back" (戻すな!, Modosu na!); 53. "Waiting Room" (控え室, Hikaeshitsu); 54. "Centipede" (百足, Mukade); 55. "Pumped Up" (気合い, Kiai); Bonus Manga 1: "Tornado's Day Off" (タツマキの休日, Tatsumaki no Kyūjitsu); Bonus Manga 2: "Sense" (センス, Sensu); Bonus Manga 3: "Numbers" (数字, Sūji)
Mumen Rider warns Saitama about Garou and his hero-hunting spree. Tank-Top Master also briefs Saitama, explaining that Garou's fighting style is rooted in martial arts and differs significantly from the brute force of monsters. Meanwhile, Bang's disciple Charanko, now sidelined due to injuries, gives Saitama his entry pass for an upcoming martial arts tournament. Garou continues his rampage, defeating Golden Ball and Spring Mustachio. However, while roaming the streets, he is casually knocked out by Saitama, who mistakes him for a random thug while shopping for a wig to disguise himself as Charanko for the tournament. At the tournament, Saitama meets Sour Face, an old acquaintance of Charanko, who explains the competition's rules and format. Elsewhere, Metal Bat is assigned to protect a high-ranking Hero Association patron and his son. However, they are attacked by a giant centipede monster. Metal Bat swiftly defeats it, only for a larger centipede, Centisenpai, to appear, followed by an even more massive threat—Centichoro. Bonus 1: Tornado grows frustrated with her constant battles against monsters. The Hero Association grants her a day off, but she soon becomes bored. Bonus 2: Saitama enters a hero costume contest but lets a young boy use his costume instead. Meanwhile, the contest judge harshly critiques every participant. Bonus 3: The Blizzard Bunch challenges Saitama and his friends to a video game battle. Elsewhere, Child Emperor develops a mask designed to assess the power levels of heroes and monsters, though it remains an unfinished prototype.
11	Giant Insect; Daikaichū (大怪蟲)	June 3, 2016; 978-4-08-880646-4	March 7, 2017; 978-1-4215-9226-8
56. "Head-On" (真正面, Mashōmen); 57. "Interruption" (横槍, Yokoyari); 58. "Giant Insect" (大怪蟲, Daikaichū); 59. "Only You" (お前だけ, Omae dake); 60. "Entering the Stadium" (入場, Nyūjō); 61. "Dark Horse" (ダークホース, Dāku Hōsu); Bonus Manga: "Rangers" (戦隊, Sentai)
Metal Bat continues his intense battle against Centichoro but is sent flying. Before he can recover, he is confronted by Garou, who challenges him to a fight. Meanwhile, minor heroes Pineapple and Mohican attempt to evacuate Hero Association patron Narinki and his son, while S-Class hero Metal Knight engages Centichoro. As Metal Bat and Garou clash, their fight is abruptly halted when Metal Bat's younger sister, Zenko, arrives and demands they stop. Elsewhere, Rhino-Wrestler defeats Pineapple and Mohican, successfully abducting Narinki's son. Across multiple cities, more high-level monsters emerge, spreading destruction. One of them approaches Garou, offering him a place in the newly formed Monster Association. At the 22nd Super Fight martial arts tournament, the contestants are introduced, and the first round of matches commences. Meanwhile, Bang and Bomb continue their search for Garou. Bonus: Saitama is recruited into a team of heroes resembling the Super Sentai (Power Rangers). However, his lack of teamwork skills quickly proves to be a problem.
12	The Strong Ones; Tsuyoi Yatsura (強い奴ら)	December 2, 2016; 978-4-08-880785-0	September 5, 2017; 978-1-4215-9620-4
62. "A Reason for Seeking" (求める理由, Motomeru Riyū); 63. "Games and Combat" (試合と戦闘, Shiai to Sentō); 64. "Limit" (限界, Genkai); 65. "Sisters" (姉妹, Shimai); 66. "The Strong Ones" (強い奴ら, Tsuyoi Yatsura); 67. "Extraordinary" (規格外, Kikaku-gai); Bonus Manga: "King's Weekday Off" (キングの休日のようで平日, Kingu no Kyūjitsu no Yōde Heijitsu)
The Super Fight tournament continues as Suiryu, the runner-up from the previous tournament and a fan favorite, easily defeats Lightning Max. Snek also secures a victory against his opponent. Meanwhile, Genos heads outside to engage multiple Demon-level monsters, receiving tactical support from the Hero Association. Back in the tournament, Sour Face wins against Jakumen, while Saitama, disguised as Charanko, effortlessly defeats Bakuzan. Meanwhile, Monster Princess Super S brainwashes the men of the Blizzard Bunch and forces them to attack Blizzard. However, Blizzard resists her mind control and is saved by her sister, Tornado. In the next tournament round, Suiryu defeats Snek without much effort. As the Monster Association's invasion intensifies, attacks spread to the hospital and prison. S-Class heroes fight desperately to contain the chaos. A subordinate informs Monster King Orochi that Goketsu has defeated Genos and is now heading toward the tournament arena. Bonus: King unknowingly becomes the target of several hitmen at a restaurant. However, his unshaken demeanor and a series of coincidences make them second-guess their assassination attempt.
13	Monster Cells; Kaijin Saibō (怪人細胞)	April 4, 2017; 978-4-08-881103-1	March 6, 2018; 978-1-4215-9806-2
68. "A Great Force" (大戦力, Daisenryoku); 69. "Monster Cells" (怪人細胞, Kaijin Saibō); 70. "Strength Is Fun" (強いは楽しい, Tsuyoi wa Tanoshī); 71. "Martial Arts Is...!" (武術とは...!!, Bujutsu to wa...!!); Bonus Manga: "Star" (スター, Sutā)
A group of A-Class superheroes gathers to battle a massive octopus monster. Flashy Flash arrives and swiftly disables the creature by striking all of its eye-covered suckers. Before it can retaliate, Tornado appears and effortlessly crushes it into a single octopus ball with her psychic powers. Meanwhile, Atomic Samurai meets with a council of swordmasters to discuss the growing threat of Garou. One of the members, Haragiri, reveals that he has already transformed into a monster using "monster cells" and urges the others to do the same to gain immense power. Atomic Samurai, seeing Haragiri's monstrous transformation, wastes no time in cutting him down. Back at the Super Fight tournament, Saitama advances to the finals and faces Suiryu. Suiryu expresses his desire for an entertaining fight, but after a few casual exchanges, he grows serious. He delivers a powerful blow that knocks off Saitama's wig, revealing his disguise. As a result, Saitama is disqualified from the tournament. Suiryu, still eager for a fight, challenges Saitama again, but Saitama nonchalantly ends it by casually hip-checking him out of the arena. Before the fighters can recover, monsters invade the tournament grounds, rounding up the injured participants. The formidable monster Goketsu appears, announcing his intention to convert the strongest fighters into monsters using the same transformation method Haragiri used. Bonus: During one of Amai Mask's concerts, a group of monsters attacks, forcing him to deal with them mid-performance.
14	The Depths of Despair; Zetsubō no Hate (絶望の果て)	August 4, 2017; 978-4-08-881231-1	July 3, 2018; 978-1-9747-0043-1
72. "Monsterization" (怪人化, Kaijin-ka); 73. "Strong Guys Fight Back" (強い奴の抵抗, Tsuyoi Yatsu no Teikō); 74. "The Depths of Despair" (絶望の果て, Zetsubō no Hate); 75. "Against the Rules" (反則, Hansoku)
Goketsu shares his story of how he was once a champion before being defeated and captured by a monster. He was then offered the chance to gain monstrous powers, transforming into what he is today. He extends the same offer to the other fighters, and half a dozen contestants accept, ingesting the monster cells and undergoing monstrous transformations. They then engage in battle with Suiryu. Snek and Max attempt to assist Suiryu, but they are no match for the newly empowered monsters. As Suiryu is brutally beaten, he realizes he needs a hero after all and cries out for help. Saitama responds to his plea, arriving just in time to defeat both monsters effortlessly.
15	Pulling the Strings; An'yaku suru Mono-tachi (暗躍する者たち)	December 4, 2017; 978-4-08-881431-5	January 1, 2019; 978-1-9747-0223-7
76. "Bored Like Usual" (いつも通りの退屈, Itsumodōri no Taikutsu); 77. "Stagnation and Growth" (停滞と成長, Teitai to Seichō); 78. "Pulling the Strings" (暗躍する者たち, An'yaku suru Mono-tachi); 79. "Cheapo Trick" (ハメ技, Hame-Waza); 80. "Surrounded" (包囲, Hōi); Bonus Manga 1: "Threat Level" (災害レベル, Saigai Reberu); Bonus Manga 2: "Sighting" (目撃, Mokugeki)
Puri-Puri Prisoner defeats a monster named Free Hugger. Saitama becomes bored again. King meets up with Saitama and tries to cheer him up, stating that Saitama should strive not just to be the strongest but to be the greatest hero. After losing to Watchdog Man, Garou attempts to attack King, but Saitama easily kicks him through a concrete wall. Speed-o'-Sound Sonic is recruited into the Monster Association by former ninjas Tempest Wind and Hellfire Flame. Zombieman pursues Martial Gorilla, who is ultimately defeated by Armored Gorilla. At the Hero Association headquarters, a monster warns the executives that they must bring their best heroes to battle against the Monster Association. When the executives refuse to listen, the monster kills one of them—only to be defeated by Superalloy Blackluster. The next day, pamphlets describing the monster uprising circulate, and several monsters begin targeting Saitama. Meanwhile, Garou reunites with the kid who previously lent him the Hero Guide and decides to use it again to fight against Death Gatling and a group of heroes. Bonus: The bonus manga explores how the Hero Association assesses monster threat levels and how they compare to hero rankings. It also details the Hero Association's response to the threat of Vaccine Man.
16	Depleted; Dashi Tsukusu (出し尽くす)	April 4, 2018; 978-4-08-881451-3	May 7, 2019; 978-1-9747-0461-3
81. "Tenacity" (意地, Iji); 82. "Depleted" (出し尽くす, Dashi Tsukusu); 83. "Cruel Steps" (過酷な階段, Kakoku na Kaidan); 84. "Escalation" (エスカレーション, Esukarēshon); Bonus Manga: "Growth Process" (成長過程, Seichō Katei)
Using Tareo's guidebook, Garou looks up information on his opponents—a mix of A-Class and B-Class heroes. Despite sustaining injuries, he manages to defeat them. Meanwhile, Genos engages Garou in battle, with both fighters appearing evenly matched. As the fight continues, grunts from the Monster Association attempt to recruit Garou. However, before they can succeed, Bang and Bomb arrive. Bang overpowers Garou in battle, while Bomb swiftly eliminates the grunts. Bonus: Hero Eyelashes reunites with his former Blizzard Bunch colleague, Megane.
17	Because I'm the Bald Cape? Hagemanto dakara ka? (ハゲマントだからか?)	August 3, 2018; 978-4-08-881556-5	August 6, 2019; 978-1-9747-0745-4
85. "Power" (パワー, Pawā); 86. "Because I'm the Bald Cape?" (ハゲマントだからか?, Hagemanto dakara ka?); 87. "Hideout" (アジト, Ajito); Bonus Manga: "Confidence" (自信, Jishin)
Garou continues his battle against Bang, Bomb, and Genos. As he begins to weaken, Phoenix Man from the Monster Association arrives and rescues him. Meanwhile, Centichoro attacks in an attempt to lure out Blast. It overpowers Bang, Bomb, and Genos but is ultimately distracted by King and then destroyed by Saitama. The Hero Association intensifies its efforts to locate the Monster Association headquarters. Blizzard tries to recruit Saitama and his friends to join an assault against the monsters. Meanwhile, Garou is offered a leadership position among the monsters, but only if he proves his loyalty by delivering the head of a hero. Bonus: Sonic gains confidence after recovering from stomach issues caused by eating cooked monster cells.
18	Limiter; Rimittā (リミッター)	December 4, 2018; 978-4-08-881690-6	December 3, 2019; 978-1-9747-0946-5
88. "Monster Nature" (怪人性, Kaijinsei); 89. "Limiter" (リミッター, Rimittā); 90. "Hot Pot" (鍋, Nabe)
The relentless monster attacks begin to destabilize society, straining the Hero Association. Garou broods over his inability to become a monster and is once again defeated by Saitama in a chance encounter. He later steps in to defend Tareo from King the Ripper and Insect God, who are following a plot by the mysterious leader of the Monster Association to "develop" him. While Garou is distracted, they apparently kill him. Meanwhile, Zombieman tracks down the House of Evolution, only to discover that Dr. Genus has given up after realizing that Saitama has removed his "limiter", rendering his research obsolete. Dr. Kuseno visits Genos at Saitama's home. As the Monster Association prepares for a great confrontation with the S-Class heroes, they rely on Gyoro-Gyoro's tactical brilliance to match monsters against their most favorable opponents. Garou, though severely wounded, awakens alive.
19	All My Cabbage; Hakusai Shōmetsu (白菜消滅)	April 4, 2019; 978-4-08-881813-9	March 3, 2020; 978-1-9747-1170-3
91. "All My Cabbage" (白菜消滅, Hakusai Shōmetsu); 92. "Because I'm a Monster" (怪人だから, Kaijin dakara); 93. "Pochi" (ポチ, Pochi); 94. "Manhole" (マンホール, Manhōru); Bonus Manga: "Reality Punch" (現実パンチ, Genjitsu Panchi)
Child Emperor requests that Genos and Silverfang be excluded from the S-Class team assembled to rescue the abducted boy, as he does not trust them after their failure to defeat Garou. Meanwhile, Saitama enjoys a hot pot meal with his comrades. Garou recovers from his injuries and infiltrates the Monster Association hideout to take revenge on King the Ripper. After "rescuing" Tareo from King the Ripper, Garou takes on three demon-level monsters simultaneously, followed by a dragon-level dog monster. With each battle, he grows stronger, much to Gyoro-Gyoro's delight. Gyoro-Gyoro once again offers to monsterize Garou, but he refuses. Garou then fights Orochi but is ultimately defeated. Meanwhile, Saitama, awakened by the tremors from Garou's battles underground, heads into the sewers to investigate. Bonus: Saitama reads a manga and wishes for monsters to be as strong as those depicted in the story. Moments later, he encounters a monster that looks exactly like one from the manga—but defeats it with a single punch.
20	Let's Go! Iku zo! (行くぞ!)	July 4, 2019; 978-4-08-881814-6	July 7, 2020; 978-1-9747-1474-2
95. "Let's Go!" (行くぞ!, Iku zo!); 96. "Waste Ya!" (蹴散らせ!, Kechirase!); Bonus Manga: "Weaponry" (所持アイテム, Shoji Aitemu)
As the S-Class heroes plan their attack, Amai Mask insists on joining them rather than leading the support team as the top A-Class hero. King tries to recruit his friends the disregarded heroes Bang, Bomb, Genos and Blizzard join his team for the raid, but King stays back to wait for Saitama who has already wandered into the tunnels in the lair. The support team encounters the first wave of monsters. While Tornado fights the mysterious psychic-powered Jagan, the A and B-Class heroes stand up to the monster horde until they meet Rhino-Wrestler. Bonus: The bonus chapter shows about different kind of weapons heros use.
21	In an Instant; Isshun (一瞬)	December 4, 2019; 978-4-08-881815-3	October 6, 2020; 978-1-9747-1764-4
97. "The Decision Is?" (判定は?, Hantei wa?); 98. "Fast Guy" (速い奴, Hayai Yatsu); 99. "In an Instant" (一瞬, Isshun); 100. "Backpack" (ランドセル, Randoseru); 101. "Tears of Regret" (悔し泣き, Kuyashinaki); Bonus Manga: "Can't Wait" (待ってられない, Matte rarenai)
As Gyoro-Gyoro observes and analyzes their strength, the S-Class heroes defeat the next wave of monsters before advancing into the Monster Association hideout. The retreating monsters are crushed into a meat cube, which is then fed to Orochi. Flashy Flash battles Tempest Wind and Hellfire Flame, first in their demon-level ninja forms and then in their dragon-level monster forms. Meanwhile, Child Emperor discovers a disassembled Metal Knight robot, along with evidence that Dr. Bofoi withheld critical information about the Monster Association from the Hero Association. Child Emperor then defeats Phoenix Man and becomes the first to reach Waganma, the kidnapped child. As they attempt to escape, they encounter a mechanized robot, forcing Child Emperor to deploy his remaining resources to hold it back. He is then confronted by the Resurrected Phoenix Man, now a dragon-level threat. In response, Child Emperor activates his Brave Giant battle armor. Bonus: Charanko tries to impress a female nurse but is effortlessly upstaged by Suiryu.
22	Light; Hikari (光)	September 4, 2020; 978-4-08-882292-1	June 1, 2021; 978-1-9747-2290-7
102. "Boy Hero" (少年ヒーロー, Shōnen Hīrō); 103. "Light" (光, Hikari); 104. "Undying Dirty Fight" (不死身の泥仕合, Fujimi no Dorojiai); 105. "Amai Mask" (アマイマスク, Amai Masuku); 106. "Viewer Discretion Advised" (見てはいけないもの, Mite wa Ikenai Mono); Bonus Manga: "Coffee" (コーヒー, Kōhī)
As Child Emperor battles Resurrected Phoenix Man using Brave Giant, Phoenix Man unexpectedly offers him an alliance, recognizing him as a kindred spirit. Despite his efforts to fight back, Child Emperor struggles until they reach the area where Saitama is. Encouraged by messages of support from Saitama and Zombieman, he finds the strength to prevail. Shedding his Brave Giant armor, he cleverly uses a tickling device to revert Phoenix Man into a harmless chick. With Waganma in tow, they successfully escape. Meanwhile, Zombieman faces a formidable vampire foe with a powerful regeneration ability that matches his own. Elsewhere, Atomic Samurai's disciples engage in battle against Super S, who has taken control of Narinki's rescue squad, turning them into her puppets. They attempt to defeat her without harming the controlled squad members. However, Amai Mask arrives to confront Super S, prompting the disciples to withdraw. Amai Mask brutally smashes Super S's face into a wall, but she makes a shocking discovery—Amai Mask is not human. As he prepares to kill the rescue squad, who have returned to normal, the disciples step in to stop him. Bonus: Zombieman is seen at a café when he is suddenly called away on an assignment.
23	Authenticity; Shingan (真贋)	January 4, 2021; 978-4-08-882455-0	October 5, 2021; 978-1-9747-2512-0
107. "Back" (背中, Senaka); 108. "Authenticity" (真贋, Shingan); 109. "A Dangerous Multiplying Monster" (増えるヤバイ奴, Fueru Yabai Yatsu); 110. "Love Evolution" (ラブエボリューション, Rabu Eboryūshon); 111. "Gluttony" (食い意地, Kuiiji); 112. "Superalloy Blackluster" (超合金クロビカリ, Chōgōkin Kurobikari); Bonus Manga: "Setting an Example" (範(はん), Han)
Bushi Drill and Narinki's troops, now freed from Super S's control, continue their battle in the tunnels. Meanwhile, Atomic Samurai's disciples take down Malong Hair, while their master effortlessly defeats Machine God G5 and several other opponents. Above ground, Child Emperor, Saitama, and Waganma successfully escape the tunnel, but Waganma reveals that Tareo is still trapped inside. Determined to rescue him, Child Emperor heads back underground. Elsewhere, Atomic Samurai faces off against Black Spermatozoon, while Zombieman engages in a fierce battle with the Homeless Emperor. Puri-Puri Prisoner attempts to rescue his fellow prisoners, only to discover that they have been transformed into monsters. He then sets his sights on defeating the cat-like Nyaan. Meanwhile, Pig God clashes with the equally gluttonous Gums, and Superalloy Blackluster takes on Insect God. Bonus: Amai Mask evaluates Pig God.
24	Sacrifice; Ikenie (生贄)	December 3, 2021; 978-4-08-883002-5	November 1, 2022; 978-1-9747-3440-5
113. "Great Misfortune" (大凶, Daikyō); 114. "Strong Opponent" (強敵, Kyōteki); 115. "Sacrifice" (生贄, Ikenie); 116. "Fake" (フェイク, Feiku); 117. "Rematch" (再戦, Saisen); 118. "Mirror" (鏡, Kagami); Bonus Manga: "Strong Common Folk" (強一般人, Kyō Ippanjin)
Atomic Samurai's disciples and Narinki's troops find themselves in a dire situation after encountering Evil Mineral Water, a Dragon-level threat. Meanwhile, Saitama comes across Overgrown Pochi and effortlessly punches him, sending tremors throughout the entire hideout. Nyaan attempts to attack Saitama but, sensing danger, quickly retreats. Elsewhere, Tornado engages in battle with Gyoro Gyoro, while Saitama confronts Monster King Orochi and swiftly defeats him. However, Gyoro Gyoro mistakenly believes that King was the one who took down Orochi. As King continues deeper into the hideout, he encounters a monster impersonating Waganma. Meanwhile, Fubuki, Bang, and Bomb face off against Super S and successfully defeat her, only to be led straight into the path of Overgrown Pochi. At the same time, Amai Mask crosses paths with the grotesque President Ugly. Bonus: A monster named Dark encounters a group of strong commoners who are devoted fans of Superalloy Darkshine.
25	Drive Knight; Kudō Kishi (駆動騎士)	May 2, 2022; 978-4-08-883136-7	May 2, 2023; 978-1-9747-3666-9
119. "Encounter" (遭遇, Sōgū); 120. "Play" (遊び, Asobi); 121. "Cornered" (窮鼠, Kyūso); 122. "Drive Knight" (駆動騎士, Kudō Kishi); 123. "Intimations of Intrigue" (裏の気配, Ura no Kehai); 124. "Only Strength Is Necessary" (必要なのは強さだけ, Hitsuyō na no wa Tsuyosa dake); 125. "Broken" (壊れている, Kowareteiru); Bonus Manga: "Back of the Head" (後頭部, Kōtōbu)
Puri-Puri Prisoner engages in battle with Garou. Meanwhile, Flashy Flash mistakes Saitama for a monster and attacks him. However, upon realizing that Saitama is merely a low-ranking hero, he decides to test him after witnessing Saitama effortlessly dodge his attack. To his shock, Flashy Flash discovers that Saitama possesses speed equal to his own. Outside, Nyaan overpowers the heroes and wreaks havoc. Gearsper uses psychokinesis in an attempt to fight back but becomes completely exhausted after giving it his all. With Nyaan still undefeated, he attempts to take Waganma hostage but is interrupted by Drive Knight. Utilizing various battle formations, Drive Knight ultimately defeats Nyaan. He then contacts Sekingar, revealing that Metal Knight, also known as Dr. Bofoi, is a traitor. Suddenly, Machine God G5 ambushes them. Drive Knight refrains from fighting, but Genos arrives just in time and swiftly destroys G5. Genos gathers the injured heroes, along with Waganma and Hero Association executives, and transports them to safety. Sitch, realizing his mistake, apologizes to Genos for excluding him from the operation. With no hesitation, Genos rejoins the battle. Elsewhere, Superalloy Blackluster stumbles upon Puri-Puri Prisoner, who has been defeated, and prepares to face Garou. Meanwhile, Child Emperor discovers Atomic Samurai's disciples lying unconscious and prepares to take on Evil Mineral Water. Bonus: A younger Saitama, during his training days, attempts to see the back of his own head.
26	Unfathomable; Michi (未知)	June 4, 2022; 978-4-08-883137-4	September 19, 2023; 978-1-9747-4048-2
126. "Unfathomable" (未知, Michi); 127. "The New Blizzard Bunch" (新フブキ組, Shin Fubuki-Gumi); 128. "Sit" (おすわり, Osuwari); 129. "Psychos" (サイコス, Saikosu); 130. "Monster Tag" (怪人ごっこ, Kaijin-gokko); 131. "Monster Fusion!" (魔合体!, Ma-gattai!); Bonus Manga: "The Great Selection" (大抜擢, Daibatteki)
27	Tornado Full Blast; Tatsumaki Zenkai (タツマキ全開)	November 4, 2022; 978-4-08-883336-1	January 16, 2024; 978-1-9747-4294-3
132. "Eating Away" (侵蝕, Shinshoku); 133. "Bowled Over!" (ひっくり返す!, Hikkurikaesu!); 134. "Tornado Full Blast" (タツマキ全開, Tatsumaki Zenkai); 135. "Heroes Don't Lose!" (負けない!, Makenai!); 136. "A Great Something" (大いなる何か, Ōinaru Nani ka); 137. "The Ultimate Mind" (究極の叡智, Kyūkyoku no Eichi)
28	Into the Abyss; Shin'en e (深淵へ)	June 2, 2023; 978-4-08-883586-0	May 21, 2024; 978-1-9747-4565-4
138. "The Wringer" (ねじれ, Nejire); 139. "Giant Barrier" (巨大バリア, Kyodai Baria); 140. "Disgrace and Foundation" (醜態と基本, Shūtai to Kihon); 141. "Unconquerable" (不屈, Fukutsu); 142. "Resonance" (共鳴, Kyōmei); 143. "Into the Abyss" (深淵へ, Shin'en e); Bonus Manga: "Sense of Smell" (嗅覚, Kyūkaku)
29	Renewed Effort; Kendochōrai (捲土重来)	November 2, 2023; 978-4-08-883742-0	November 5, 2024; 978-1-9747-4887-7
144. "Abyss"; 145. "Rocks and Diamonds" (石とダイヤ, Ishi to Daiya); 146. "Renewed Effort" (捲土重来, Kendochōrai); 147. "The Right Attitude" (とるべき態度, Torubeki Taido); 148. "Jupiter, the Bringer of Jollity" (木星, Mokusei); 149. "Silverfang" (シルバーファング, Shirubā Fangu); 150. "The Black Shine"
30	The Greatest Obstacle; Saidai no Kabe (最大の壁)	March 4, 2024; 978-4-08-883863-2	March 18, 2025; 978-1-9747-5250-8
151. "Backup" (助太刀, Sukedachi); 152. "Deleterious Substance" (劇物, Gekibutsu); 153. "Crossing the Line" (一線, Issen); 154. "Ambush" (伏兵, Fukuhei); 155. "Master and Pupil" (師と弟子, Shi to Deshi); 156. "The Greatest Obstacle" (最大の壁, Saidai no Kabe); Bonus Manga: "King Style" (王(キング)の風格, Kingu no Fūkaku)
31	Supreme Purgatorial Explosive Heat Wave-Motion Gun; Rengoku Musō Bakunetsu Hadō-hō (煉獄無双爆熱波動砲)	July 4, 2024; 978-4-08-884098-7	July 15, 2025; 978-1-9747-5539-4
157. "Check" (王手, Ōte); 158. "Confiscation" (没収, Bosshū); 159. "Supreme Purgatorial Explosive Heat Wave-Motion Gun" (煉獄無双爆熱波動砲, Rengoku Musō Bakunetsu Hadō-hō); 160. "Results" (成果, Seika); 161. "Divine Punishment" (神罰, Shinbatsu)
32	Blessing; Shukufuku (祝福)	November 1, 2024; 978-4-08-884267-7	December 16, 2025; 978-1-9747-5816-6
162. "Bad Boys"; 163. "2Bad"; 164. "Blessing" (祝福, Shukufuku); 165. "Watershed" (分水嶺, Bunsuirei); 166. "Source of Anxiety" (不安要素, Fuan Yōso); 167. "The Coolest Hero" (最高のヒーロー, Saikō no Hīrō); Bonus Manga: "Reflect" (反射, Hansha)
33	Power Squared; Jijō (二乗)	April 4, 2025; 978-4-08-884479-4	May 19, 2026; 978-1-9747-6338-2
168. "Stronger Than a Mountain" (神魔(やま)よりも, Yama yori mo); 169. "Hateful Fists That Wrong the Gods" (神に仇なす忌むべき拳, Kami ni Adanasu Imubeki Ken); 170. "Absolute Evil" (絶対悪, Zettai Aku); 171. "Power Squared" (二乗, Jijō); Bonus Manga: "Rumors of Drive Knight" (駆動騎士の噂, Kudō Kishi no Uwasa)
34	Dawn; Yoake (夜明け)	August 4, 2025; 978-4-08-884676-7	September 15, 2026; 978-1-9747-6652-9
172. "I.O."; 173. "The Awakening of the Gods" (神々の目覚め, Kamigami no Mezame); 174. "Dawn" (夜明け, Yoake); 175. "Gains" (得たもの, Eta Mono)
35	The Worst Guy I Could Run Into; Atcha Ikenai Yatsu (会っちゃいけない奴)	October 3, 2025; 978-4-08-884722-1	January 19, 2027; 978-1-9747-6849-3
176. "The Worst Guy I Could Run Into" (会っちゃいけない奴, Atcha Ikenai Yatsu); 177. "New Crib" (新居, Shinkyo); 178. "Secret Info" (秘匿情報, Hitoku Jōhō); 179. "Special Something" (華, Hana); 180. "Visitor" (訪問者, Hōmon-sha); 181. "Epicenter" (震源, Shingen); Bonus Manga: "It's Not Scary" (怖くないよ, Kowakunai yo)
36	Unknown Quantity; Michisū (未知数)	March 4, 2026; 978-4-08-884891-4	—
182. "Paranormal Phenomena and Risk" (超常とリスク, Chōjō to Risuku); 183. "Take it Outside!" (外でやれ!, Soto De Yare!); 184. "Eye Witnesses" (目撃, Mokugeki); 185. "Busy" (取り込み中, Torikomi-chū); 186. "Scalp Friction" (頭皮と摩擦, Tōhi to Masatsu); 187. "Unknown Quantity" (未知数, Michisū); 188. "Transactions" (取引, Torihiki); Bonus Manga: "First Courage" (最初の勇気, Saisho no Yūki)
37	Turning Point; Magarikado (曲がり角)	July 3, 2026; 978-4-08-885085-6	—
189. "Scout" (スカウト, Sukauto); 190. "Updates" (アップデート, Appudēto); 191. "Turning Point" (曲がり角, Magarikado); 192. "Butterfly Stands Firm" (蝶と背中, Chō to Senaka); 193. "Worth" (値打ち, Neuchi); 194. "Test Slash" (試し斬り, Tameshigiri)
38	— — (—)	December 4, 2026; 978-4-08-885292-8	—

== Chapters not yet in tankōbon format ==
These chapters have not yet been published in a tankōbon volume.

195. "Schemes" (謀, Hakarigoto)
196. "Heroes" (ヒーローたち, Hīrō-tachi)
197. "Level Up" (強化(レベルアップ), Reberu Appu)
198. "A Completely Unknown World" (全然知らない世界, Zenzen Shiranai Sekai)
199. "Fast Attacks" (速攻, Sokkō)
200. "The Great One" (あの御方, Ano Okata)
201. "Ninja Village" (忍の里, Shinobi no Sato)
202. "Karma" (宿業, Shukugō)
203. "The Way You Are Now" (今のお前なら, Ima no Omae nara)
204. "Saving Life" (命拾い, Inochibiroi)
205. "Where?" (何処(どこ)に, Doko ni)
206. "No Longer Kicking" (白目, Shirome)
207. "Divine Beast" (神獣, Shinjū)
208. "Fever" (フィーバー, Fībā)
209. "Fully Recovered" (ぜんかい, Zenkai)
210. "Neo Leaders" (ネオリーダーズ, Neo Rīdāzu)
211. "The Fierce Ones" (猛者, Mosa)
212. "Aura" (たたずまい, Tatazumai)
213. "Special" (特別, Tokubetsu)
214. "Shopping" (買いもの, Kaimono)
215. "Training Camp" (強化合宿, Kyōka Gasshuku)
216. "Handsome Kamen a.k.a. Amai Mask" (イケメン仮面アマイマスク, Ikemen Kamen Amai Masuku)
217. "Because We're Human" (人間なんだから, Ningen nan dakara)
218. "The Public Eye" (衆目, Shūmoku)
219. "Fanatic" (ファナティック, Fanatikku)
220. "Who You Are" (在り方, Arikata)
221. "Freak" (お化け, Obake)
222. "Rock" (石, Ishi)
223. "Just Gettin' Started" (これから, Kore kara)
224. "New..." (新たなる･･, Aratanaru)
225. "Great Contributions" (大抜擢, Daibatteki)
226. "A New Force" (新勢力, Shinseiryoku)
227. "Webigather" (ウェビギャザ, Webigyaza)
228. "New Blood"
229. "New Blood, Part 2"
230. "New Blood, Part 3"
231. "Ferocity..." (猛威, Mōi)
232. "Existential Threat" (危急存亡, Kikyū Sonbō)
233. "Existential Threat, Part 2" (危急存亡 2, Kikyū Sonbō 2)
234. "Interception" (迎撃, Geigeki)
235. "Drunken Tiger" (酔虎, Suiko)
236. "Assistance" (援護, Engo)
237. "Protection" (守護, Shugo)
238. "Contribution" (貢献, Kōken)
239. "Guardianship" (後見, Kōken)
240. "The Part-Timer" (バイトのお兄さん, Baito no Oniisan)
241. "Return The Favor" (借りは即返す, Kari wa Soku Kaesu)
242. "Traces" (痕跡, Konseki)
243. "Young Fellers" (若者たち, Wakamono-tachi)
244. "Developments" (動向, Dōkō)
245. "Surprises" (なかなか, Nakanaka)
246. "It'll All Work Out" (きっとうまくいく, Kitto Umaku Iku)
247. "Diabolical Child" (ヒドーくん, Hidō-kun)
248. "Shadow Versus Darkness" (影対闇, Kage tai Yami)
