= Isko =

Isko or ISKO may refer to:

== People ==
- Isko Moreno (born 1974), Filipino politician and actor
- Isko Salvador (born 1958), Filipino actor, comedian and comedy scriptwriter

== Organizations ==
- International Society for Knowledge Organization
- ISKO (clothing company)

== Other ==
- 1409 Isko, provisional designation of an asteroid

== See also ==
- Isco (born 1992), Spanish professional footballer
