= 2010 Football League Cup final =

- Match programme cover
- Event: 2009–10 Football League Cup
Aston Villa	Manchester United
1	2
- Date: 28 February 2010
- Venue: Wembley Stadium, London
- Man of the Match: Antonio Valencia (Manchester United)
- Referee: Phil Dowd (Staffordshire)
- Attendance: 88,596
- Weather: Mostly cloudy 7 °C (45 °F)

The 2010 Football League Cup final was the final match of the 2009–10 Football League Cup, the 50th season of the Football League Cup, a football competition for the 92 teams in the Premier League and The Football League. The match, played at Wembley Stadium on 28 February 2010, was won by Manchester United, who beat Aston Villa 2–1. Aston Villa took the lead in the fifth minute of the game, via a James Milner penalty kick, but Michael Owen equalised for Manchester United seven minutes later. Wayne Rooney, who replaced the injured Owen shortly before half time, scored the winning goal with 16 minutes left to play.

Manchester United went into the match as defending champions, having beaten Tottenham Hotspur on penalties in the 2009 final. The win gave them their fourth Football League Cup title, their third in five years and their second in succession, becoming the first team to retain the trophy since Nottingham Forest in 1990. It was the first time Manchester United successfully defended a major cup, having been losing finalists as title holders in the 1995 and 2005 FA Cup, and the 2009 Champions League finals. Since Manchester United qualified for the 2010–11 UEFA Champions League via their league position, the place in the following season's Europa League which would have been given to the winners of the League Cup was instead given to Villa, since they finished in sixth place in the 2009–10 Premier League.

== Background ==
Out of the 173 previous meetings between the two sides, Manchester United had won 87 and Aston Villa had won 49, with the remaining 37 games finishing as draws; however, Villa's record in the League Cup against United was markedly better, with four wins in six matches between them. United's only League Cup win over Aston Villa came in October 1975, when they won 2–1 at Villa Park in the third round. The only previous meeting between the two teams in the final of the competition came in 1994, when Villa won 3–1 and United winger Andrei Kanchelskis became the first player to be sent off in a League Cup final.

Aston Villa hold the advantage over Manchester United in the league matches between the two sides in 2009–10, having beaten the Premier League champions 1–0 at Old Trafford in December and holding them to a 1–1 draw at Villa Park three weeks before the League Cup final.

Both Manchester United and Aston Villa had played in seven Football League Cup finals, but Manchester United had only won three compared to Villa's five. United's most recent victory, however, came in 2009 – when they beat Tottenham Hotspur on penalties – whereas Villa's last League Cup title came in 1996, when they beat Leeds United 3–0. Manchester United went into the match looking to become the first team to retain the League Cup since Nottingham Forest in 1990.

== Road to Wembley ==
Manchester United			Round	Aston Villa		
Manchester United	1–0	Wolverhampton Wanderers	Round 3	Aston Villa	1–0	Cardiff City
Barnsley	0–2	Manchester United	Round 4	Sunderland	0–0 (1–3p)	Aston Villa
Manchester United	2–0	Tottenham Hotspur	Round 5	Portsmouth	2–4	Aston Villa
Manchester City	2–1	Manchester United	Semi-final	Blackburn Rovers	0–1	Aston Villa
Manchester United	3–1	Manchester City	Semi-final	Aston Villa	6–4	Blackburn Rovers
Manchester United won 4–3 on aggregate			Semi-final	Aston Villa won 7–4 on aggregate		

== Pre-match ==
=== Ticketing ===
Since 2008, the final of the Football League Cup has been played at Wembley Stadium in London. The stadium has a capacity of 90,000 spectators, and each team received an allocation of 31,750 tickets for their supporters. Both clubs chose to limit their initial applications to season ticket holders, with priority given to those supporters who had attended more cup games up to that point in the season.

=== Match ball ===
The match ball for the 2010 League Cup final is a variation of the Mitre Revolve ball used by The Football League. The ball is white and patterned with black with gold trim. 150 balls were produced for the two teams to train with prior to the final, each of which is stamped with a unique identifying number and the date of the match. The ball also features a special logo that reads "FIFTY" – in recognition of the 50th season of the League Cup – where the letter I is replaced by an image of the League Cup trophy.

=== Officials ===
Staffordshire-based referee Phil Dowd was named as the referee for the 2010 League Cup final on 1 February 2010. His only previous cup final experience came in 2006, when he was the fourth official for the 2006 FA Cup final. His assistants for the match were Shaun Procter-Green from Lincolnshire and David Richardson from West Yorkshire, with Lee Mason from Lancashire acting as fourth official.

=== Opening ceremony ===
The opening ceremony for the match began with the Football League Cup trophy being brought out onto the field of play by Manchester United fan Private Dave Tatlock of 2nd Battalion, The Parachute Regiment; Tatlock had been wounded while on tour in Afghanistan in 2008. A piece of shrapnel embedded in his spine, leaving him paralysed, and he had been told by doctors that he would never walk again. Within four weeks, he regained feeling in his legs, and three months later he was able to walk with the aid of a stick. At the time of the match, he was waiting for an operation that would fully restore his mobility.

The players and officials then emerged from the tunnel and lined up along a red carpet, accompanied by their team mascots; Manchester United's mascot was seven-year-old Charlie Simpson, selected for his fund-raising efforts in aid of the victims of the 2010 Haiti earthquake, while Aston Villa were led out by six-year-old Ben Clay, whose identical twin Oliver has cerebral palsy and attends a hospice run by Acorns Children's Hospice, whose logo Aston Villa wore on their shirts. The teams were then presented to the day's guests of honour: Brian Mawhinney, chairman of The Football League, and Martin Thomas, the Supply Chain Director of Molson Coors (UK), who own the Carling brand. Finally, the national anthem was sung by 21-year-old Camilla Kerslake.

== Match ==
=== Team selection ===
Aston Villa went into the match with only two players unavailable due to injury: forward Marlon Harewood (foot) and midfielder Nigel Reo-Coker (ankle); although midfielder Stiliyan Petrov had missed the previous game with a virus. Defender James Collins and forward Emile Heskey were both rested for Villa's FA Cup fifth round replay against Crystal Palace on 24 February. Also rested was goalkeeper Brad Friedel, indicating manager Martin O'Neill's intention for Friedel to start the final, despite reserve goalkeeper Brad Guzan having started each of Villa's other League Cup matches during the season. Defender Stephen Warnock had been suffering a shin problem earlier in the season, but he was given two weeks of rest before returning to the Villa side for their last three matches before the final to gain some match fitness.

Manchester United, on the other hand, were beset by injury and suspension; midfielder Ryan Giggs broke his arm in the league match between the two teams 18 days earlier, forcing him to miss a month of the season, while fellow midfielder Anderson suffered an injury to the cruciate ligament in his left knee against Everton and was ruled out for the remainder of the season. Defender Rio Ferdinand had been expected to play in the match following a four-match suspension for an incident against Hull City, but he suffered a recurrence of a back problem that had kept him out of contention for three months earlier in the season. Also missing with long-term injuries for United were midfielder Owen Hargreaves (knee) and defender John O'Shea (thigh), while midfielder Nani was suspended for three matches after being sent off for a two-footed tackle on Stiliyan Petrov in the match between United and Villa on 10 February.

Aston Villa's team was as expected, with the possible exception of Friedel starting in goal ahead of Guzan. Martin O'Neill played a 4–4–2 formation with Heskey and Agbonlahor in attack and Ashley Young and Stewart Downing on the wings, while Stephen Warnock was deemed fit enough to play at left-back and Stiliyan Petrov recovered from his virus to captain the side from central midfield. The biggest surprise in the teams selected by both managers was Sir Alex Ferguson's decision to leave in-form striker Wayne Rooney on the bench, opting instead to partner Michael Owen with Dimitar Berbatov up front and play four in midfield. Also surprising was Ferguson's decision to play Tomasz Kuszczak in goal ahead of Edwin van der Sar, who had been rested in midweek. It later came to light that Rooney had a minor knee injury and was named on the bench as a precaution.

=== Summary ===
==== First half ====
Aston Villa began the game quickly, earning an early free kick on the left wing before taking the lead with a penalty kick in the fifth minute; Gabriel Agbonlahor was played in behind the United defence and outpaced Nemanja Vidić to the penalty area, where the Serbian defender grabbed hold of the English striker's shirt before lunging in with a clumsy challenge. Referee Phil Dowd pointed to the penalty spot immediately, but chose not to show Vidić a red card, despite Vidić being the last defender between Agbonlahor and the goal. James Milner took the penalty and sent goalkeeper Tomasz Kuszczak the wrong way with a side-footed finish to the bottom-right corner.

Manchester United equalised seven minutes later after capitalising on an uncharacteristic mistake by Richard Dunne. Dimitar Berbatov caught Dunne in possession inside the Aston Villa half and ran towards the goal; although Dunne was able to catch up to Berbatov, his tackle only succeeded in finding its way to Michael Owen on the edge of the penalty area, where he swept the ball past Brad Friedel into the bottom-left corner of the goal. Milner had a chance to double his tally and restore his side's lead four minutes later with a left-footed shot from outside the penalty area, but Kuszczak kept the scores level with a diving, two-handed save.

As the first half drew to a close, Owen pulled up with a hamstring injury as he chased down a ball into the Aston Villa penalty area; Wayne Rooney came on to replace him in the 41st minute. Park Ji-sung almost gave Manchester United the lead in injury time at the end of the first half, as James Collins' attempted clearance from Antonio Valencia's cross fell to him just inside the penalty area, but his shot hit the post.

==== Second half ====
Michael Carrick had the first significant chance of the second half in the 49th minute, when he forced Friedel into a low, diving save after making space for himself with a neat turn on the edge of the box. It took until the 74th minute for United to take the lead, as Rooney beat Friedel with a looping header; Berbatov found Valencia on the right side of the penalty area near the goal line, and the Ecuadorian stood up a cross into the centre, where Rooney outjumped Collins to head back across goal his 28th goal of the season. Rooney almost scored again with another header three minutes later, but it hit the foot of the left-hand post.

Villa's search for an equaliser resulted in Norwegian striker John Carew coming on for Spanish right-back Carlos Cuellar with 10 minutes to play, and Carew almost had an immediate impact; as Stewart Downing crossed from the right wing, Carew's presence caused confusion in the Manchester United penalty area, and Vidić knew little about it as Heskey's header ricocheted off his shoulder and up onto the top of the crossbar. Dunne had a chance to equalise in the dying minutes as Downing chipped a cross to the far post, but he didn't make good enough contact on his header and it went harmlessly wide. United managed to survive the four minutes of injury time at the end of the second half to take the victory, the first team to retain the League Cup since Nottingham Forest in 1990 and the first time they had retained a cup trophy in their history.

=== Details ===
28 February 2010
15:00 GMT

Aston Villa	1–2	Manchester United
Milner 5' (pen.)	Report	Owen 12'; Rooney 74'

Wembley Stadium, London
Attendance: 88,596
Referee: Phil Dowd (Staffordshire)

Aston Villa	Manchester United

GK	1	(United States) Brad Friedel
RB	24	(Spain) Carlos Cuéllar		(substituted off) 80'
CB	29	(Wales) James Collins	(yellow card) 11'
CB	5	(Republic of Ireland) Richard Dunne
LB	25	(England) Stephen Warnock
RM	7	(England) Ashley Young
CM	8	(England) James Milner
CM	19	(Bulgaria) Stiliyan Petrov (c)
LM	6	(England) Stewart Downing	(yellow card) 18'
CF	11	(England) Gabriel Agbonlahor
CF	18	(England) Emile Heskey
Substitutes:
GK	22	(United States) Brad Guzan
DF	2	(England) Luke Young
DF	23	(Senegal) Habib Beye
MF	4	(England) Steve Sidwell
MF	16	(England) Fabian Delph
FW	10	(Norway) John Carew		(substituted on) 80'
FW	14	(England) Nathan Delfouneso
Manager:
(Northern Ireland) Martin O'Neill

GK	29	(Poland) Tomasz Kuszczak
RB	21	(Brazil) Rafael		(substituted off) 66'
CB	15	(Serbia) Nemanja Vidić	(yellow card) 68'
CB	23	(Northern Ireland) Jonny Evans
LB	3	(France) Patrice Evra (c)	(yellow card) 41'
RM	25	(Ecuador) Antonio Valencia
CM	16	(England) Michael Carrick
CM	24	(Scotland) Darren Fletcher
LM	13	(South Korea) Park Ji-sung		(substituted off) 85'
CF	9	(Bulgaria) Dimitar Berbatov
CF	7	(England) Michael Owen		(substituted off) 42'
Substitutes:
GK	12	(England) Ben Foster
DF	2	(England) Gary Neville		(substituted on) 66'
DF	6	(England) Wes Brown
MF	18	(England) Paul Scholes
MF	28	(Republic of Ireland) Darron Gibson		(substituted on) 85'
FW	10	(England) Wayne Rooney		(substituted on) 42'
FW	32	(Senegal) Mame Biram Diouf
Manager:
(Scotland) Sir Alex Ferguson

Match officials

- Assistant referees:
  - Shaun Procter-Green (Lincolnshire)
  - David Richardson (West Yorkshire)
- Fourth official: Lee Mason (Lancashire)

Man of the match

- Antonio Valencia (Manchester United)

Match rules

- 90 minutes.
- 30 minutes of extra time if necessary.
- Penalty shootout if scores still level.
- Seven named substitutes.
- Maximum of three substitutions.

=== Statistics ===
	Aston Villa	Manchester United
Goals scored	1	2
Total shots	10	18
Shots on target	3	9
Ball possession	50%	50%
Corner kicks	4	5
Fouls committed	10	11
Offsides	5	4
Yellow cards	2	2
Red cards	0	0

Source: BBC Sport

== See also ==
- 2009–10 Football League
- 2010 FA Cup final
