= Clarino =

Japanese brand of artificial leather

- Type: Artificial leather
- Inception: 1964
- Manufacturer: Kuraray
- Available: Yes
- Website: https://www.kuraray.com/global-en/products/clarino/

Clarino (クラリーノ, Kurarino) is a brand name for artificial leather manufactured by Kuraray. It is commonly used in garments, accessories, bags, shoes, furniture, and consumer electronics. Clarino is based on a non-woven fabric composed of synthetic fibers that are intertwined three-dimensionally. During manufacturing, it is microscopically perforated to give it breathability similar to that of natural leather. The material's softness and suppleness arise from the structure of the non-woven fabric's special fibers, superfine fiber construction and tiny cavities. Versions of Clarino are manufactured that simulate suede and top-grain leather.

Unlike natural leather, Clarino is washable and retains its softness when wet; it can therefore be higher performance than natural leather in applications where the item may be exposed to water, such as riding saddles. Top-grain leather applications include "patent leather" shoes that retain high gloss without the need for polish.

Clarino is made from blended nylon and polypropylene fibers, as well as a sponge-like polyurethane binder. Firstly, the nylon and polypropylene fibers are blended using a blend-spinning technique. The blended fiber is then shredded into fine pieces and filtered. After this, the nylon is eluted and coagulated. The fibers absorb polyurethane and coagulate in water. This allows the non-woven fabric and sponge-like binder to form around the same time. This process was developed in 1964.

The Mitre Revolve, a football manufactured by Mitre Sports International, is made from Clarino.
