= Leggings =

Several types of leg coverings

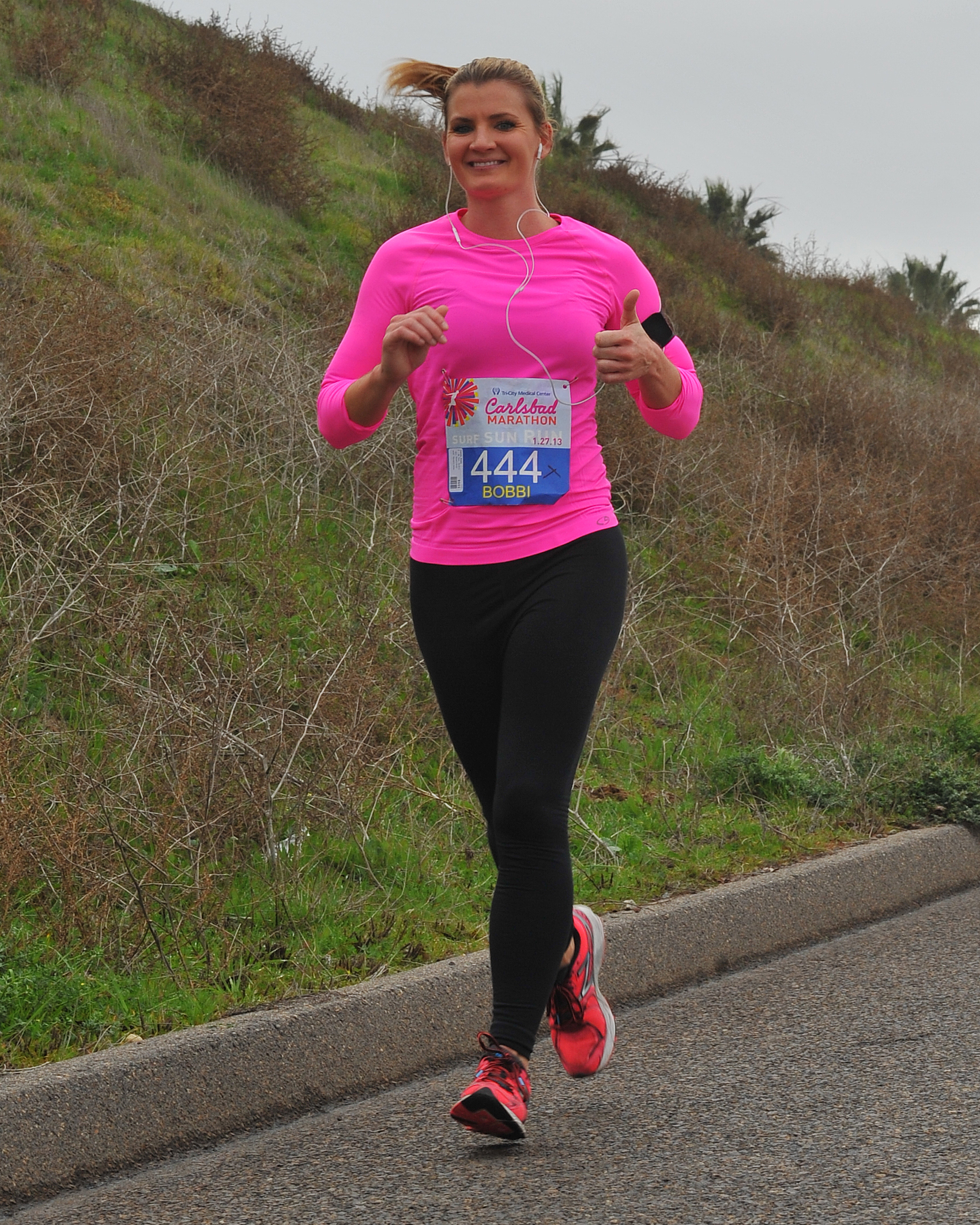
- A woman wearing black leggings
- Type: Clothing worn around the 2 legs, usually up to the ankle
- Material: Fabric

Leggings are several types of leg attire that have varied through the years. Modern usage from the 1960s onwards has come to refer to elastic close-fitting high-rise garments worn over the legs typically by women, such as leg warmers or tights. Usage from the 18th century refers to men's wear usually made of cloth or leather that is wrapped around the leg down to the ankle. In the 19th century, leggings usually referred to infants' leg clothing that were matched with a jacket, as well as leg-wrappings made of leather or wool and worn by soldiers and trappers. Leggings prominently returned to women's fashion in the 1960s, drawing from the form-fitting clothing of dancers. With the widespread adoption of the synthetic fibre Lycra and the rise in popularity of aerobics, leggings came to further prominence in the 1970s and 1980s, and eventually made their way into streetwear. Leggings are a part of the late 2010s into the 2020s athleisure fashion trend of wearing activewear outside sporting activities and in casual settings.

== History ==
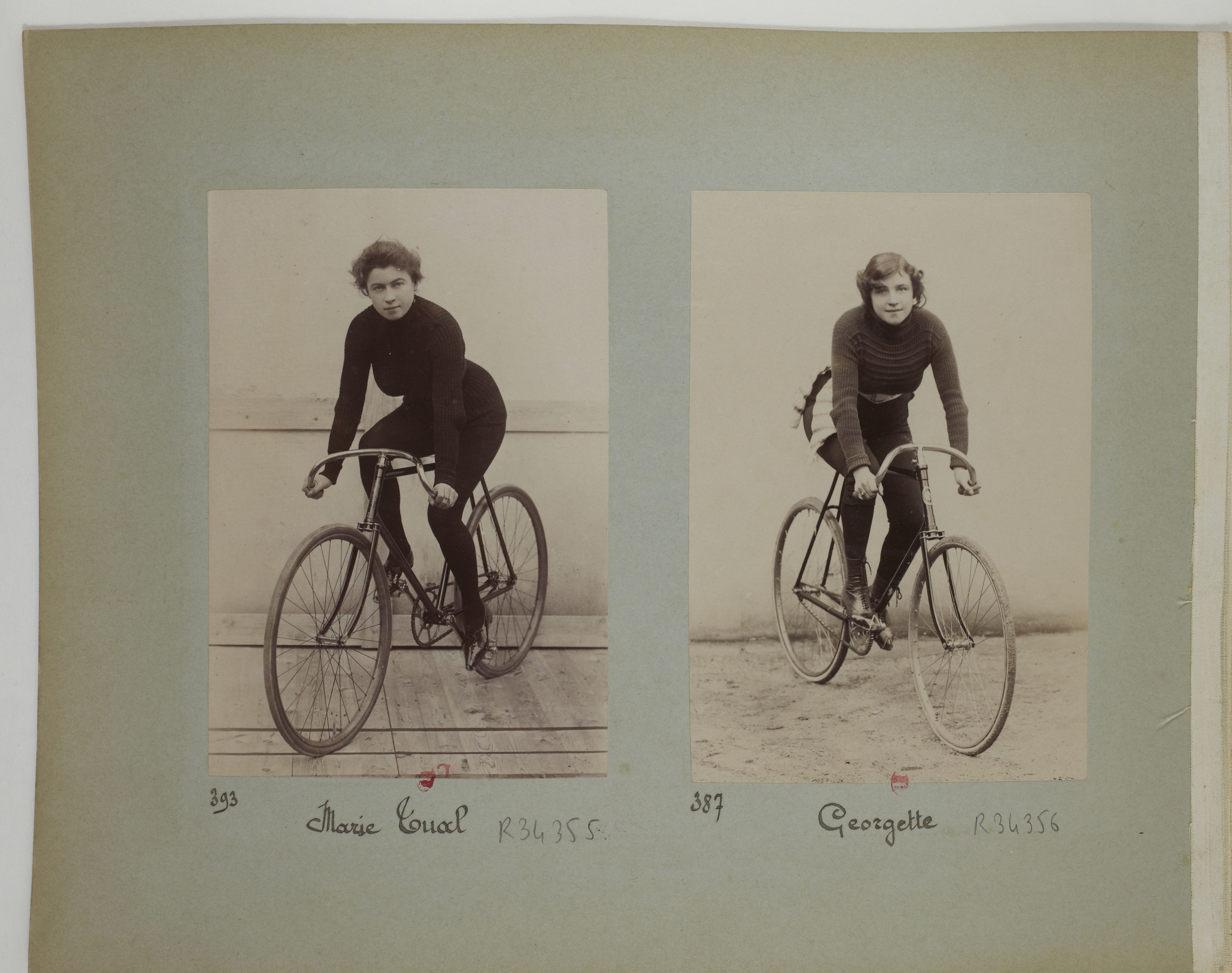
Leggings in the 1890s, Jules Beau Collection

Leggings in various forms and under various names have been worn for warmth and protection by both men and women throughout the centuries. The separate hose worn by men in Europe from the 13th to 16th centuries (the Renaissance period) were a form of leggings, as are the trews of the Scottish Highlands. Separate leggings of buckskin leather were worn by some Native Americans.

The linen pantalettes worn by girls and women under crinolines in the mid-19th century were also a form of leggings, and were originally two separate garments. Leggings became a part of fashion in the 1960s, as trousers similar to capri pants but tighter.

=== Military use ===
An American soldier wearing puttees in France, c. 1918

Since the late 19th century, soldiers of various nations, especially infantry, often wore leggings to protect their lower leg, to keep dirt, sand, and mud from entering their shoes, and to provide a measure of ankle support. At first, these were usually puttees—strips of thick woollen cloth resembling a large bandage—which were wrapped around the leg to support the ankle. They were usually held in place by a strap attached to the cloth. Later, puttees were replaced by some armies with canvas leggings fastened with buckles or buttons, usually secured at the bottom with an adjustable stirrup that passed under the sole of the shoe, just in front of the heel. The soldier placed the leggings around his calf with the buttoned side facing out and adjusted them and the strap to achieve a proper fit. Leggings typically extended to mid-calf and had a garter strap to hold them up and were secured with a tie just below the knee. Military leggings extended to the bottom of the knee and buttoned to the bottom button on the knee breeches. They are sometimes confused with gaiters, which extend to the high ankle and are worn with full-leg trousers.

During World War II, United States Army foot soldiers were referred to as legs by paratroopers and other U.S. forces that did not wear the standard Army leggings issued with the field service shoe. Late in World War II, after experiments with the general issue of high-top combat boots and jump boots for soldiers, leggings began to disappear from military service. In 1943, the United States Army modified their field service shoe by adding a taller leather upper that reached to the lower calf; secured by a combination of laces and buckles, the new design was designated the Type III Field Boot. However, the United States Marine Corps retained canvas leggings throughout the war, and used them in combat as late as the Korean War; Marines were referred to as Yellow Leg troops by North Korean and Chinese Communist forces.

== Modern fashion ==
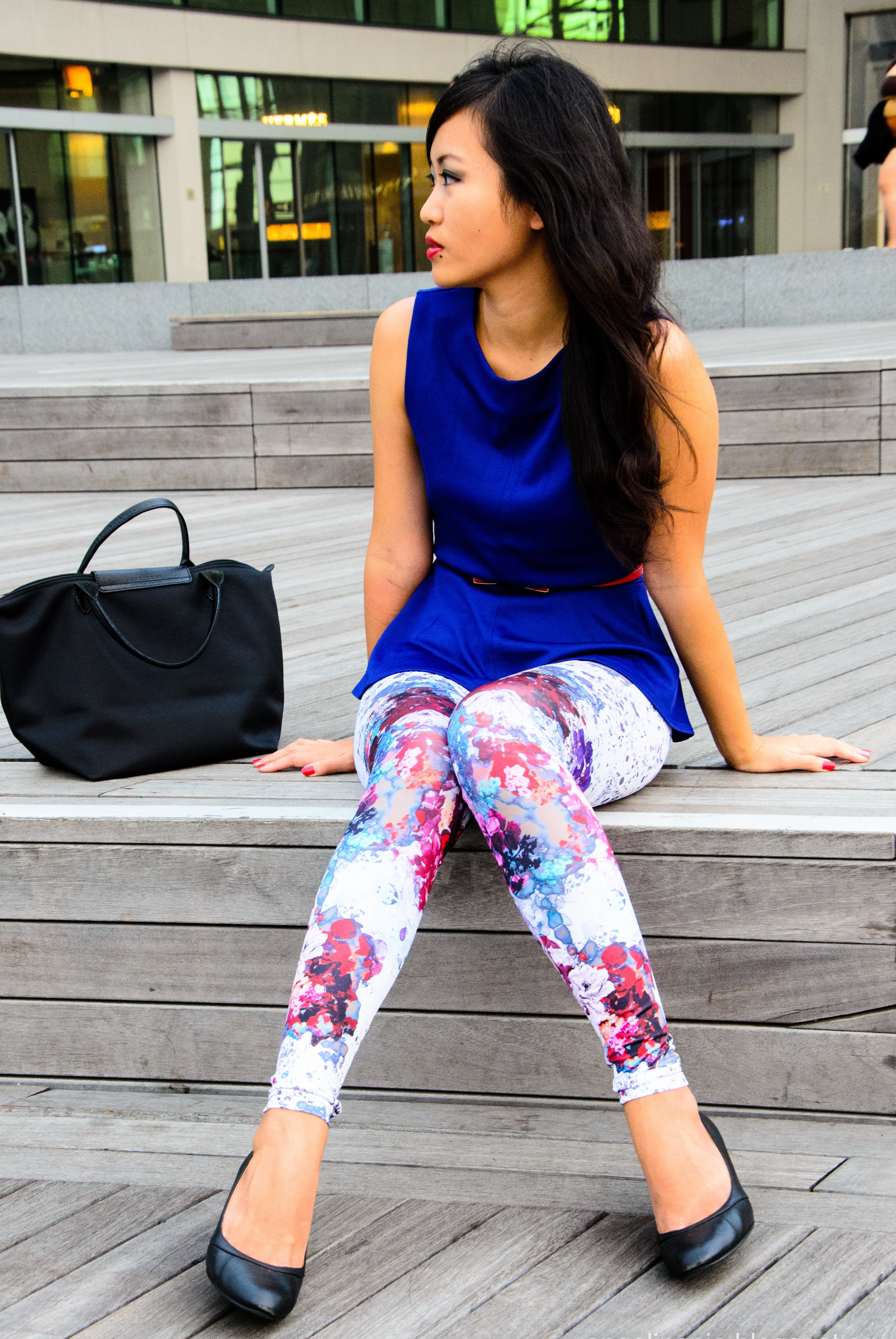
A woman wearing white leggings with a floral design

Leggings made from a nylon-lycra blend (usually 90% nylon, 10% lycra) have long been worn during exercise. Nylon lycra leggings are often referred to as bicycle or running tights, and are shinier in appearance than those made from cotton. Some have racing stripes or reflective patterns to further distinguish them as athletic wear and provide extra safety. However, since the 1980s exercise-style leggings have also been worn for fashion and as street wear.

=== For men ===
At the Marni Men's show during the Fall 2007 Fashion Week, outfits with leggings designed solely for men were introduced.

Men's leggings, dubbed "meggings" (a portmanteau of the words "men" and "leggings") were presented as the latest fashion trend for men at spring/summer 2011 fashion runways, supposed to be styled and layered beneath shorts and preferably with large, baggy, loose or long tops such as T-shirts.

K-pop idols have been wearing male leggings under shorts as a fashion item since the 2010s.

=== Jeggings ===
"Jeggings", a registered brand name of Sanko Group, are leggings made to look like skin-tight denim jeans. Jeggings were brought on by the resurgence in style of skinny jeans in the late 2000s, when a higher demand for an even tighter style of pants came about. In 2011 "Jeggings" was entered into the twelfth edition of Concise Oxford English Dictionary.

=== In sports ===
Leggings are sometimes worn during sports and other vigorous activities. Runners, dancers, and exercisers may wear them alone or with athletic shorts over them—particularly in cold weather under a sports uniform, e.g. in soccer, with soccer shorts, shin guards and soccer socks over the leggings, under a cheerleading uniform with socks over the leggings, or field hockey players under their skirts with socks over the leggings. Leggings have even been worn by a hurling full back. Boys and men can also be seen wearing them under athletic shorts with socks over them when exercising or running track or cross country etc. Also, boys and men dancers wear leggings. Leggings and bike shorts are now accepted and allowed to be worn as part of a tennis outfit on various leagues and the professional WTA tour.

=== Use as outerwear ===
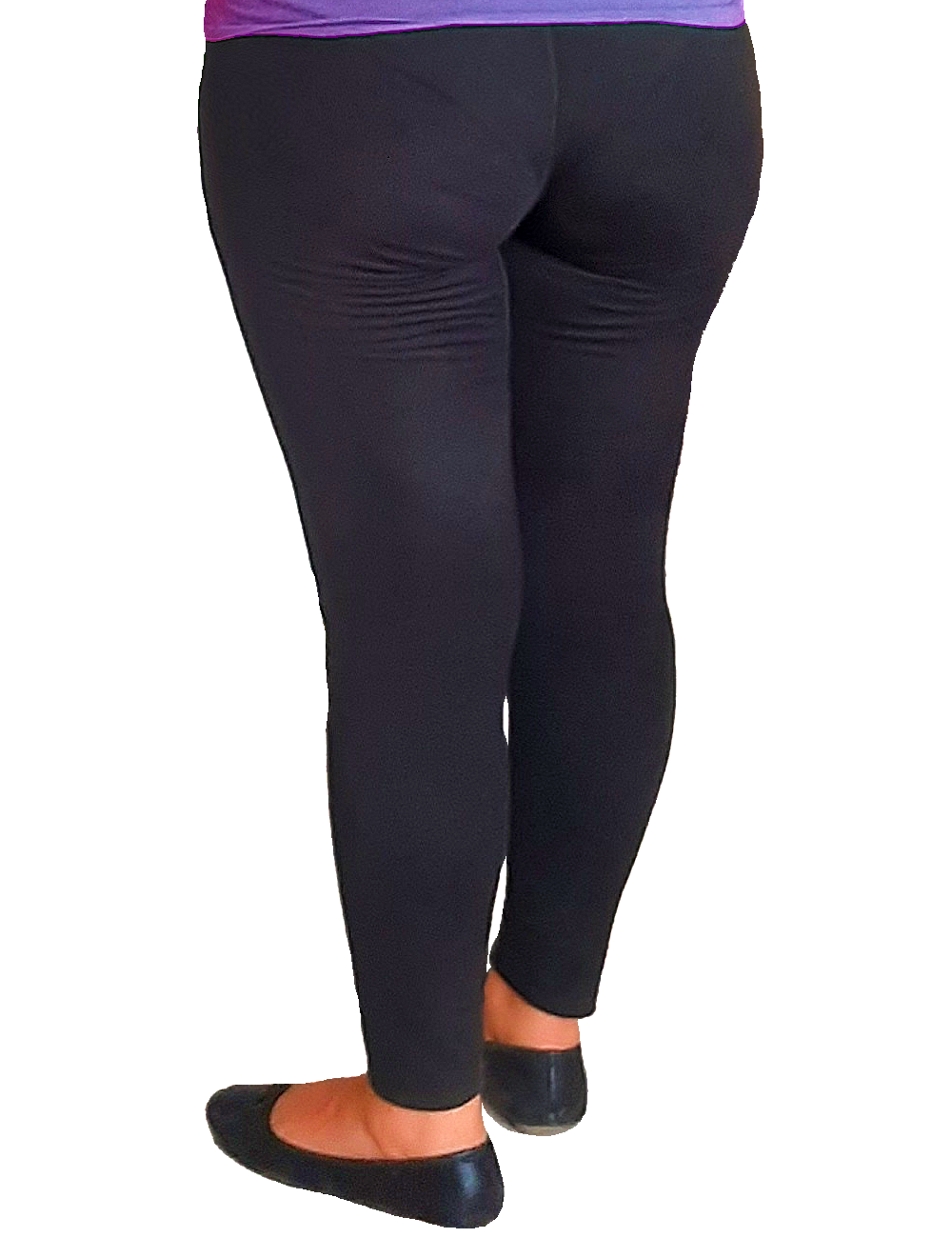
Back view of black opaque leggings

There has been societal debate about whether leggings are clothing on their own, which can be worn without covering, or are an accessory only to be worn with other items covering them, such as skirts, dresses or shorts. In a 2016 poll of its readers Glamour magazine said that 61% of its readers thought that leggings should only be worn as an accessory, whereas an article that same year from Good Housekeeping concluded that "...Leggings do, in fact, count as pants—provided they are opaque enough that they don't show your underwear."

There have been a number of instances of people wearing leggings as pants who have been restricted or criticized for their actions. In 2013, schools in Sonoma County, California, banned students from wearing them as outerwear, as did a Massachusetts school in 2015. Schools in Oklahoma, Illinois, and North Carolina have enforced or suggested similar dress codes. A state legislator in Montana introduced a bill in 2015 intended to ban leggings and yoga pants.

In March 2017, three children flying on a company pass were barred from boarding a United Airlines flight by a gate agent who decided that their leggings were inappropriate. United Airlines defended its position, while rival airline Delta stated via Twitter that leggings were welcome on its flights; United said in a statement that it does not bar regular female passengers from boarding if they are wearing leggings. Although some public figures, including actress Patricia Arquette and model and actress Chrissy Teigen, were critical of United's decision, a survey encompassing 1,800 travelers carried out by Airfarewatchdog found that 80% of their respondents backed the airline's decision to ban "inappropriate clothing", although the term was not defined in the poll.

Restrictions on wearing leggings is sometimes linked to slut shaming or body shaming, with critics noting that "...not being able to wear leggings because it's 'too distracting for boys' is giving us the impression we should be guilty for what guys do."

== Gallery ==
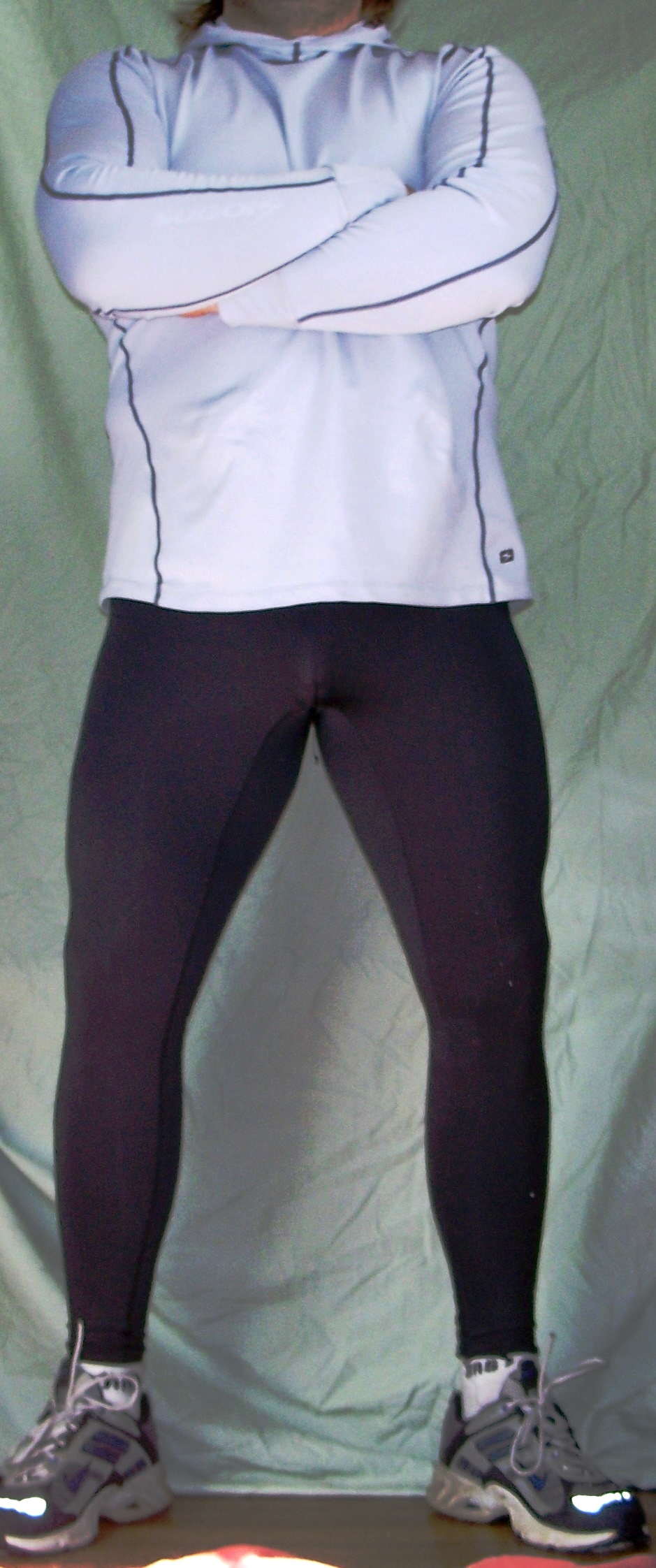
A male adult in leggings

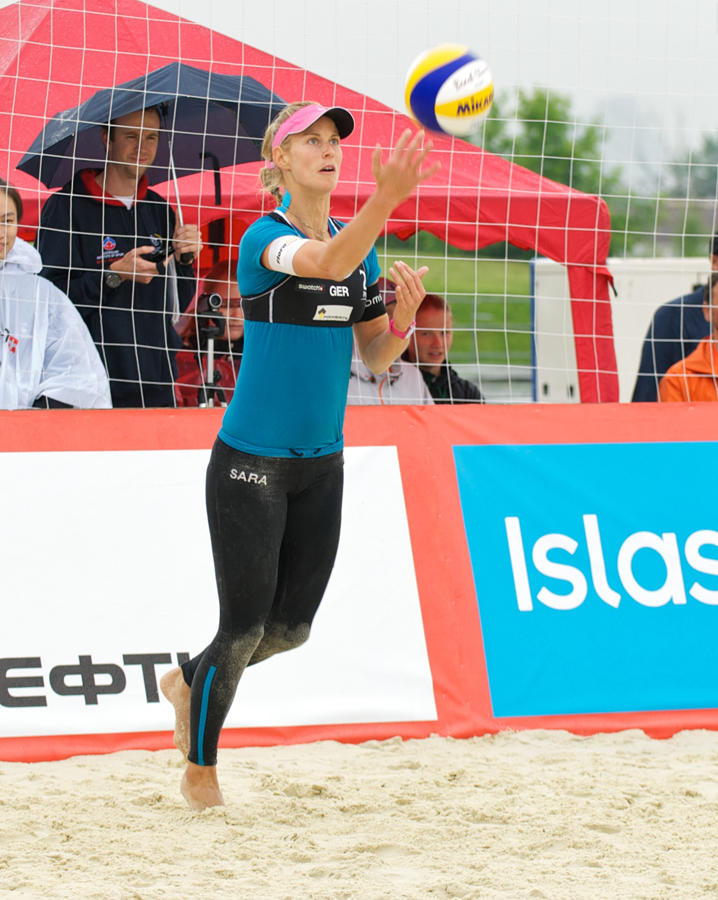
Beach volleyball player Sara Goller in leggings

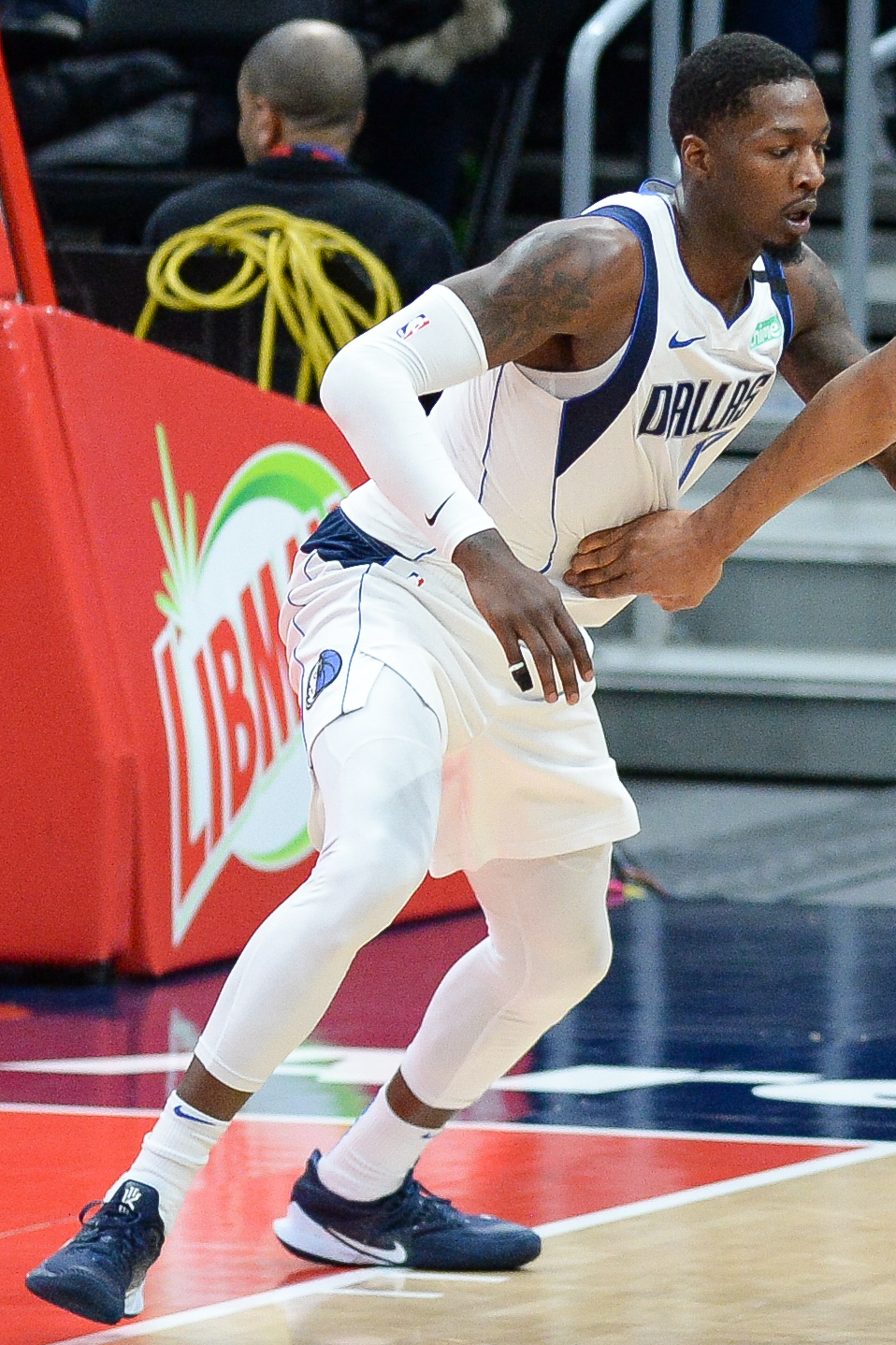
Leggings under basketball shorts worn by former Dallas Maverick Dorian Finney-Smith

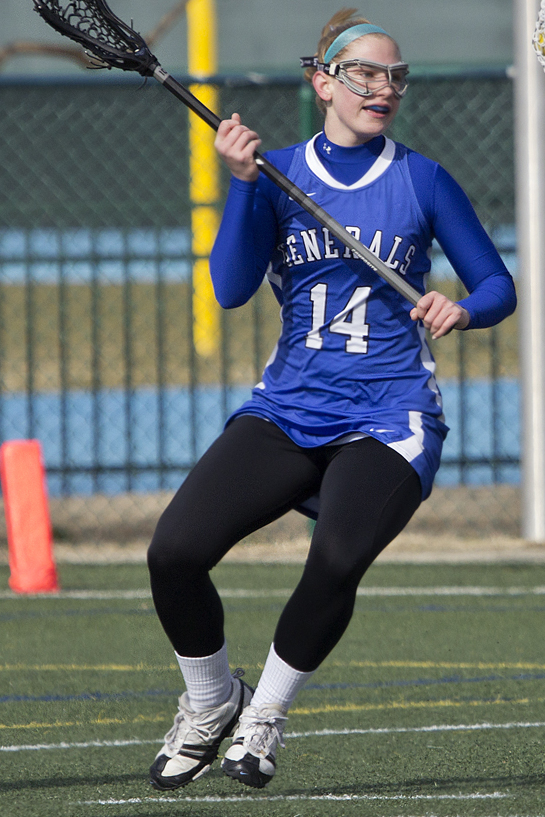
Leggings worn under a lacrosse skirt by a Washington and Lee University player

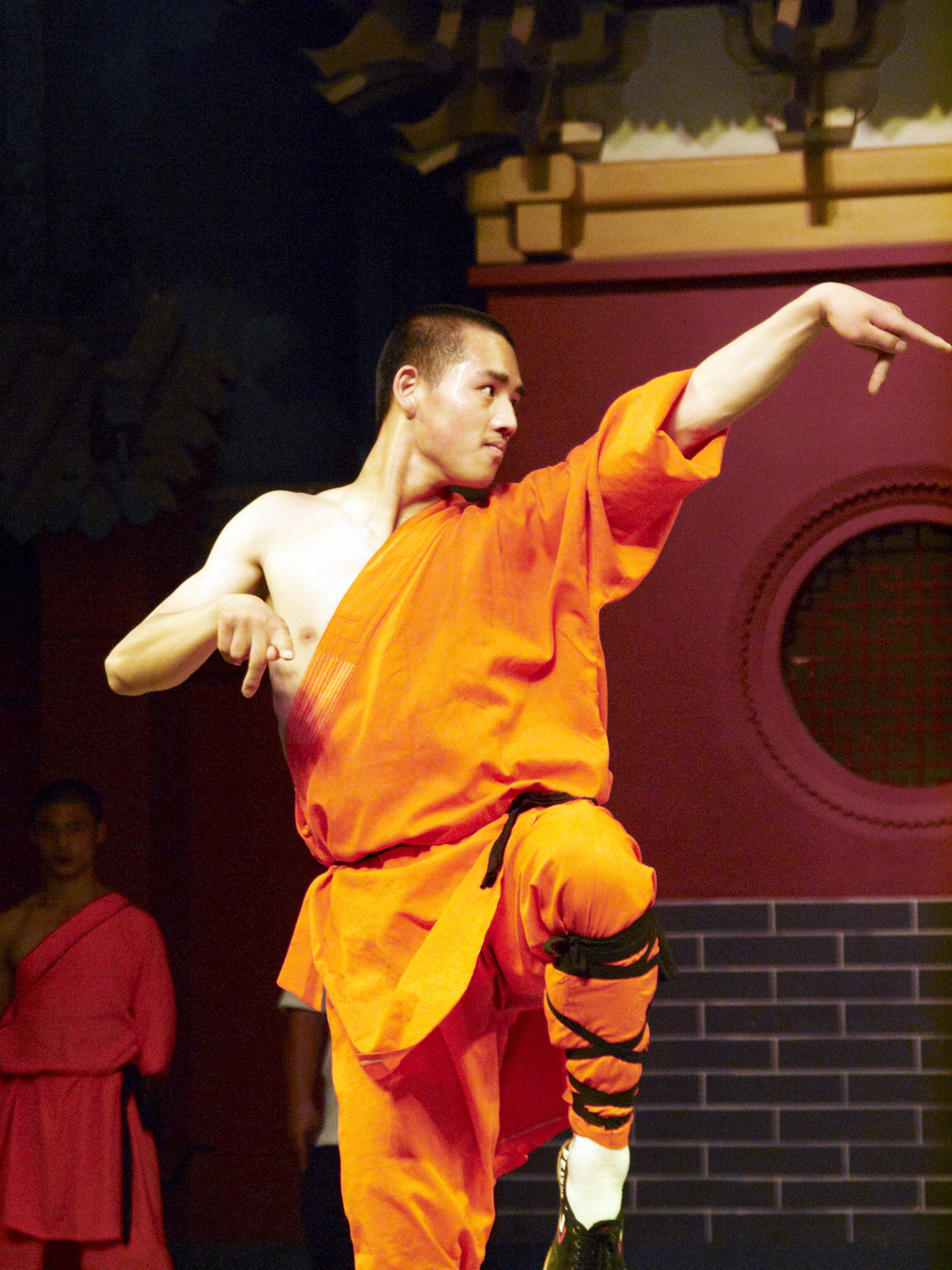
Shaolin kung fu practitioner wearing leggings

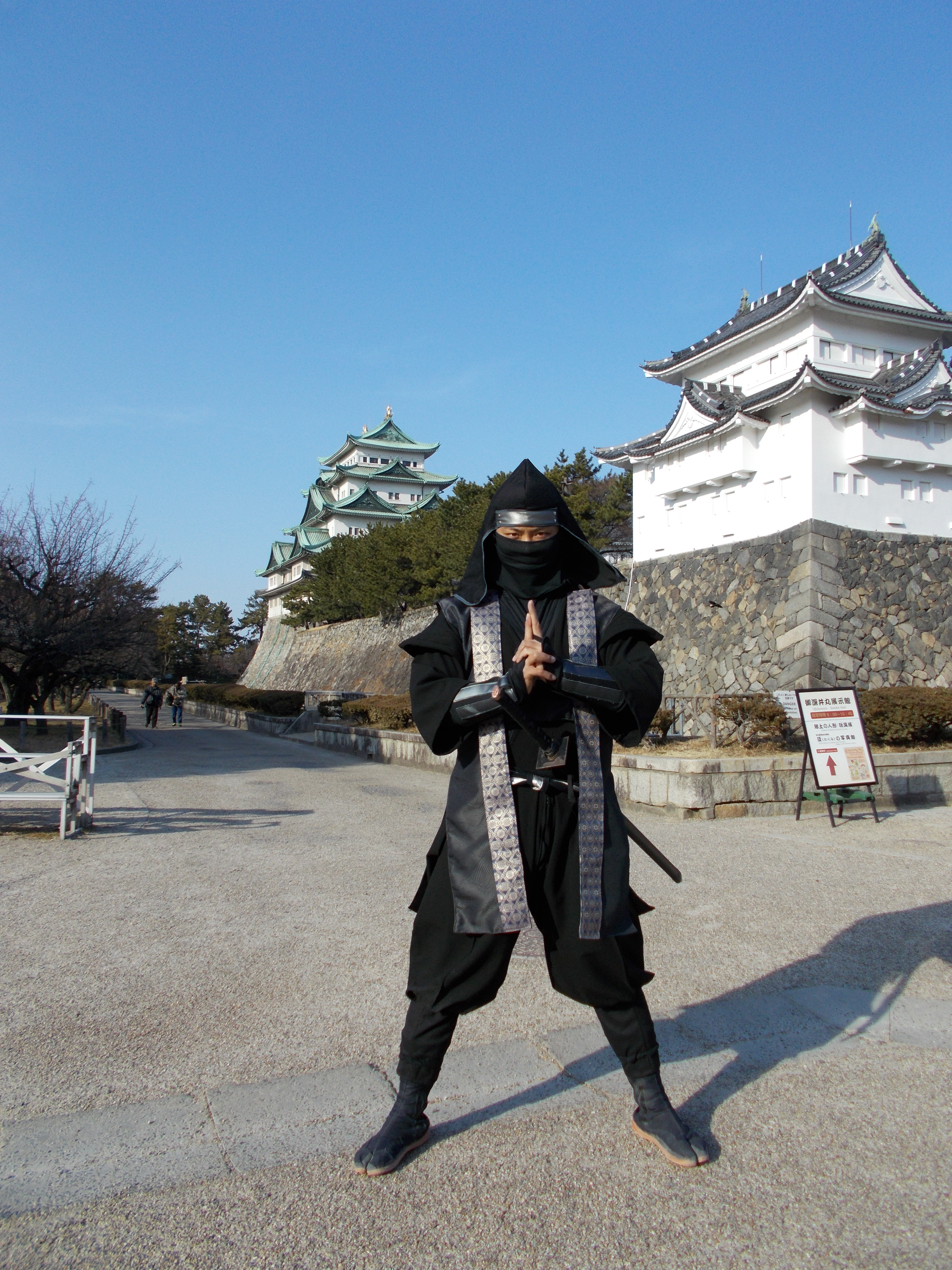
Ninja wearing leggings

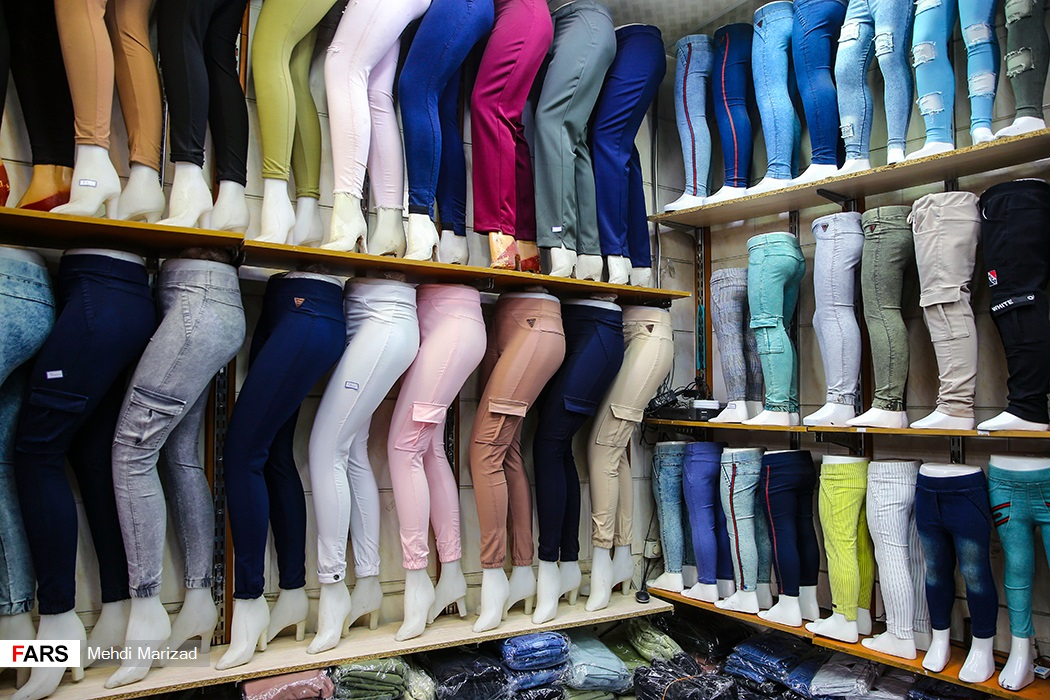
Leggings section in an Iranian bazaar

== See also ==
- Compression garment
- Stockings
- Tibialia
