= Randoseru =

Japanese school backpack

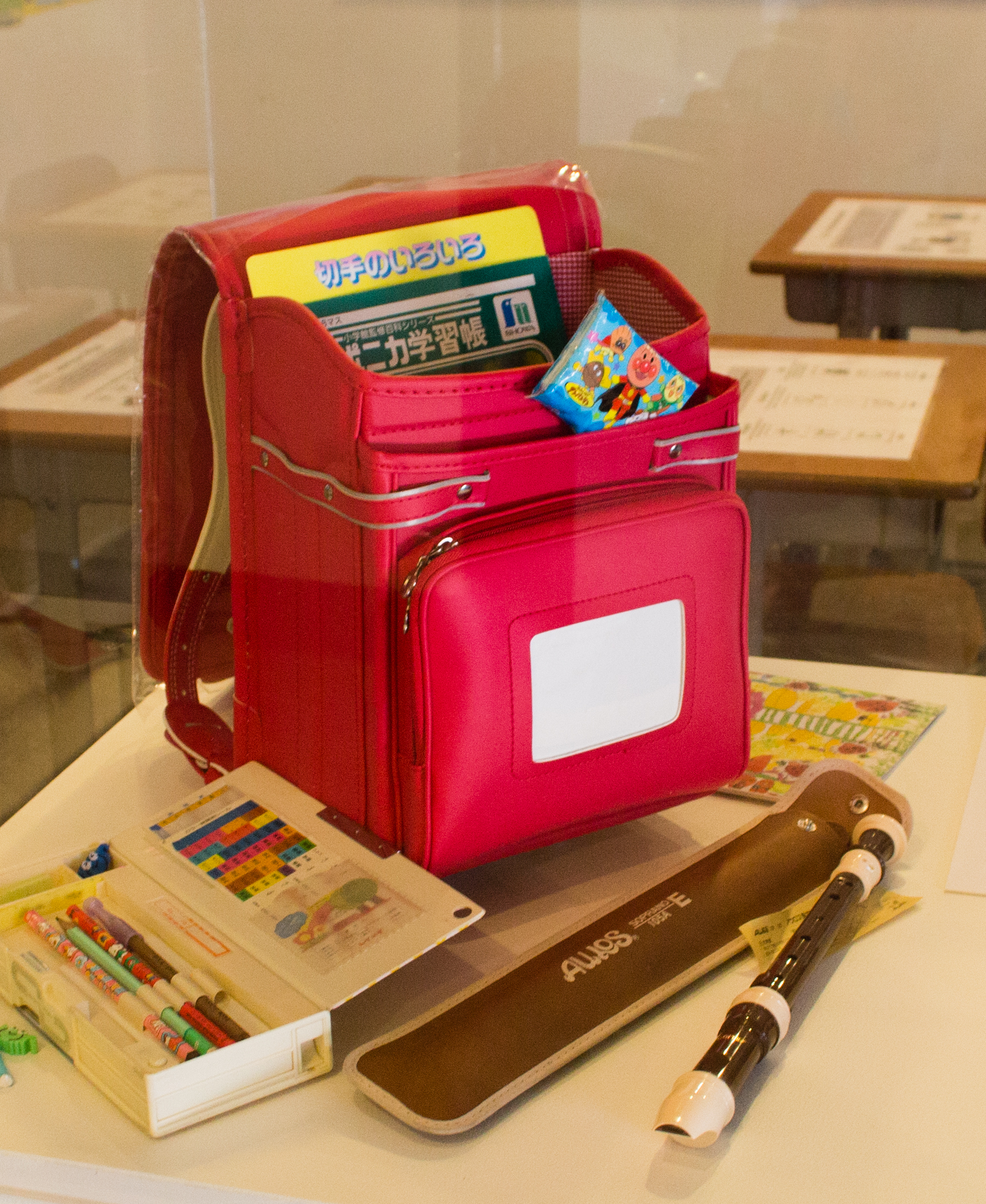
A randoseru

A randoseru (ランドセル) is a firm-sided backpack made of stitched firm leather or leather-like synthetic material, most commonly used in Japan by elementary schoolchildren. Traditionally it is given to a child upon beginning their first year of school, whereupon the child uses the same bag until grade 6. The term is borrowed from the Dutch ransel or German Ranzen meaning "backpack".

A similar system is used in Western schools. However, compared to Japanese randoseru, such as Schulranzen from Germany and Boekentas from the Netherlands, many of them are simpler and lighter in material.

== Design ==
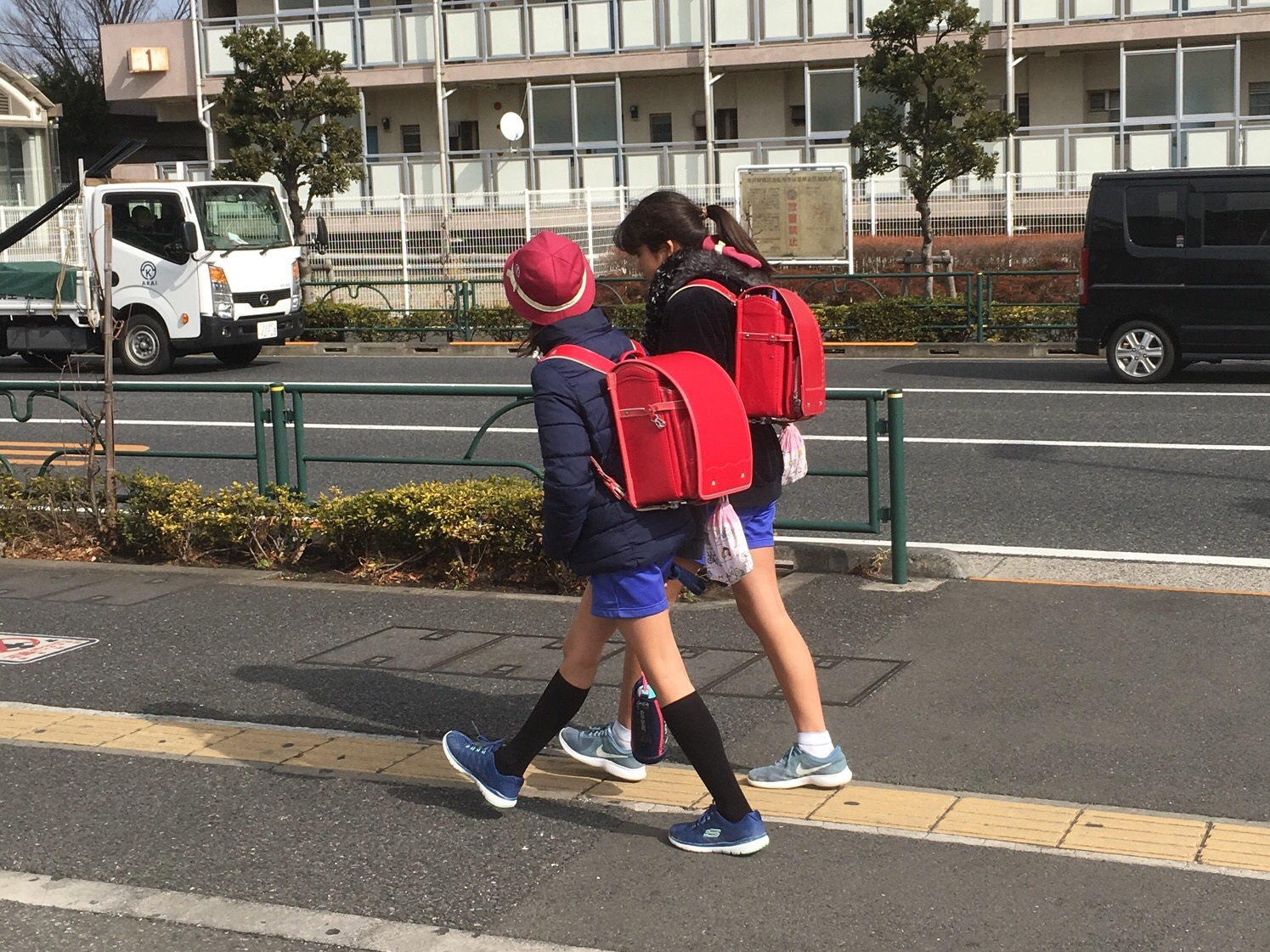
Two young girls with red randoseru, 2019

In more conservative schools the color, brand and design are mandated, typically with red as the traditional color for girls and black for boys. More colorful versions such as pink, brown, dark blue, green, blue and even two-tones are also available. These varieties have existed since the 1960s but sold poorly due to the lock-step mentality of the education system that gradually began changing in the early 2000s. The increased variety of colors is partly as a compromise for parents to retain some tradition within modernized schools which no longer require the use of traditional uniforms or the randoseru.

A typical randoseru measures roughly 30 cm high by 23 cm wide by 18 cm deep, and features a softer grade of leather or other material on those surfaces which touch the body. When empty, it weighs approximately 1.2 kilograms (2.6 pounds). However, due to demand for a lighter, more robust randoseru, as of 2004 approximately 70% are made from the synthetic leather Clarino. The backpacks have hard leather sides and divided compartments inside. They close with a long flap that goes over the entire length of the bag and clips at the bottom. Manufacturers usually offer "randoseru" in two sizes, with a slightly larger one sized to hold modern A4 flat files.

To increase traffic safety for children commuting to and from school, many communities have begun working with The Institute for Traffic Safety (交通安全協会, kōtsū anzen kyōkai) to distribute yellow plastic covers that drape over the back of the randoseru to increase its visibility.

== History ==
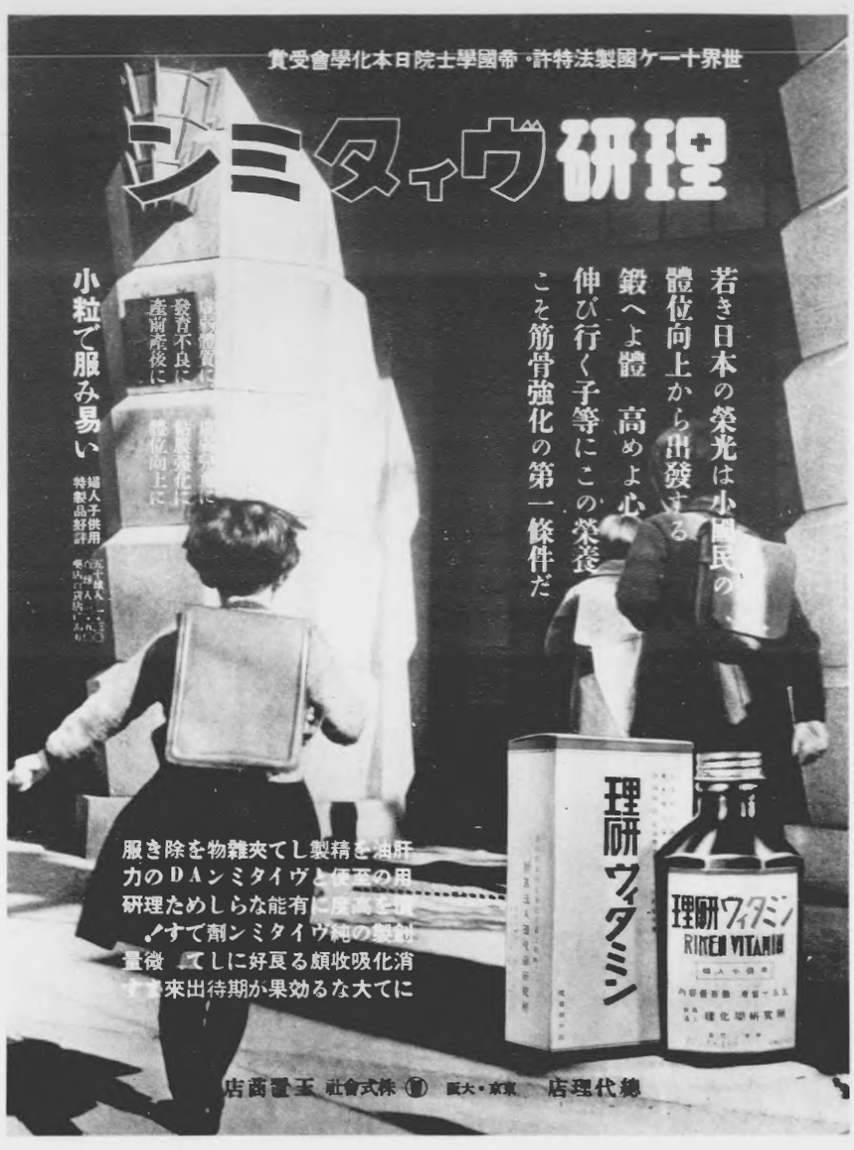
Randoseru in a 1938 magazine advertisement in Japan.

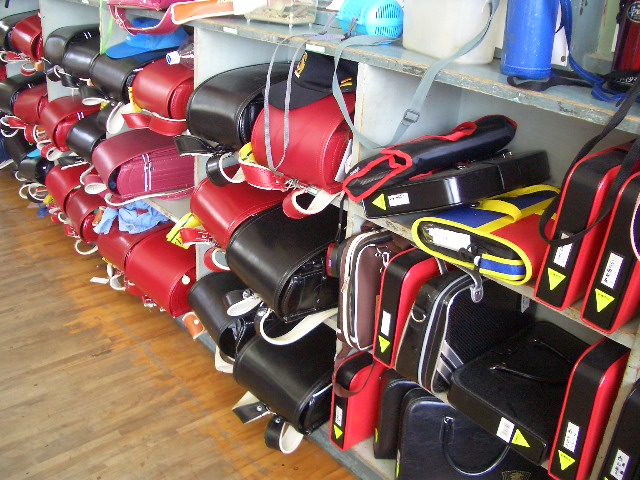
Randoseru at a school

The use of the randoseru began in the Edo era. Along with a wave of western reforms in the Japanese military, the Netherlands-style rucksack called ransel (ランドセル, randoseru) was introduced as a new way for the foot soldiers to carry their baggage. The shape much resembled the randoseru bags used today. In 1885, the Japanese government, through the elementary school Gakushūin, proposed the use of a backpack as the new ideal for Japanese elementary school students. At Gakushūin, the practice of coming to school by cars and rickshaws was banned, promoting the idea that the students should carry their own equipment and come to school on foot. At this time, the bag looked more like a normal rucksack. This changed, however, in 1887. The crown prince of the time was given a backpack upon entering elementary school (at Gakushūin). To honor the soldiers of the country, the shape of the backpack resembled the backpacks used in the military. This quite immediately became the fashion, and the shape has continued to become the randoseru used today. However, at that time most of the Japanese people could not afford such an expensive bag. Until the dramatic rise of economy in Japan in the post-World War II period, the main school bags in Japan were simple shoulder bags and furoshiki (square folding cloths).

It is a popular saying that the metal clip on the side of the randoseru was used in the military to carry grenades. However, this is not true. The metal clip was introduced in the post-World War II period, as a means to carry lunch boxes, change of clothes for P.E., etc.

== Production ==
Most randoseru production is carried out by hand. A randoseru is constructed of a single-piece body and around 200 fittings, a combination of die-cut materials and polyurethane backing plates. Assembly involves crimping, machine-sewing, walnut-gluing, drilling each shoulder strap, and riveting. The bag's materials and workmanship are designed to allow the backpack to endure the child's entire elementary education (six years). However, the care usually given to the randoseru throughout that time and afterwards can extend its life and preserve it in near-immaculate condition long after the child has reached adulthood, a testament to its utility and the sentiment attached to it by many Japanese as symbolic of their relatively carefree childhood years.

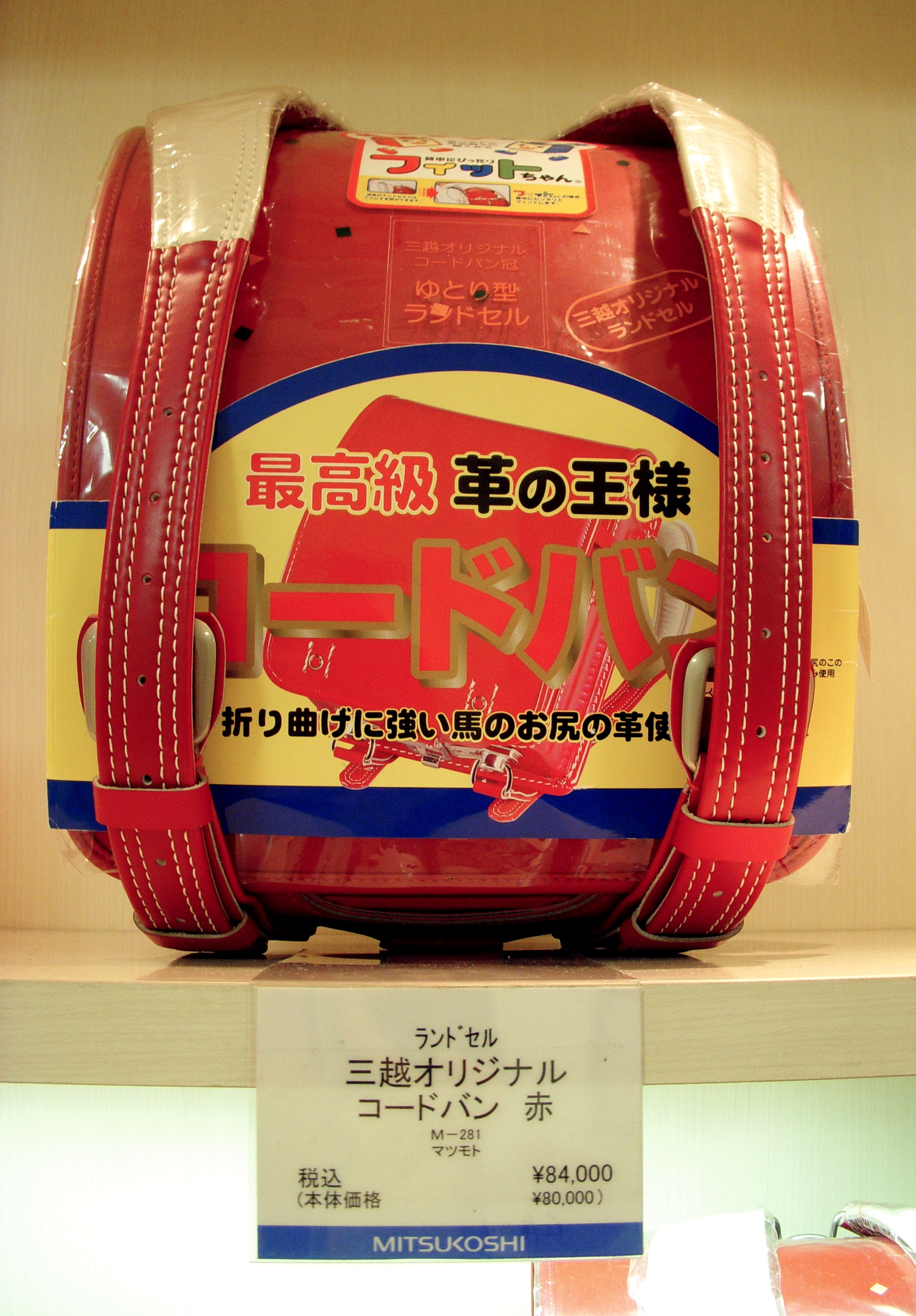
A premium 84,000 yen (about $938 or €530) randoseru made of cordovan on sale at Mitsukoshi department store in January 2008

The randoseru's durability and significance is reflected in its cost. A new randoseru made of genuine or synthetic leather can carry a price tag of around 30,000–40,000 yen at a chain store/supermarket. Typically randoseru from department stores or traditional workshops will be priced in the region of 55,000–70,000 yen, with some models (particularly those branded with logos) reaching over 100,000 yen. Clarino, a synthetic material frequently used as a substitute, reduces the cost somewhat. Often randoseru are available on auction sites in new or used condition at much lower prices, particularly after the start of the Japanese school year in April. As of January 2012, the five top randoseru in order of popularity at Amazon.co.jp are in the range of ¥8,280–16,980.

== Gallery ==
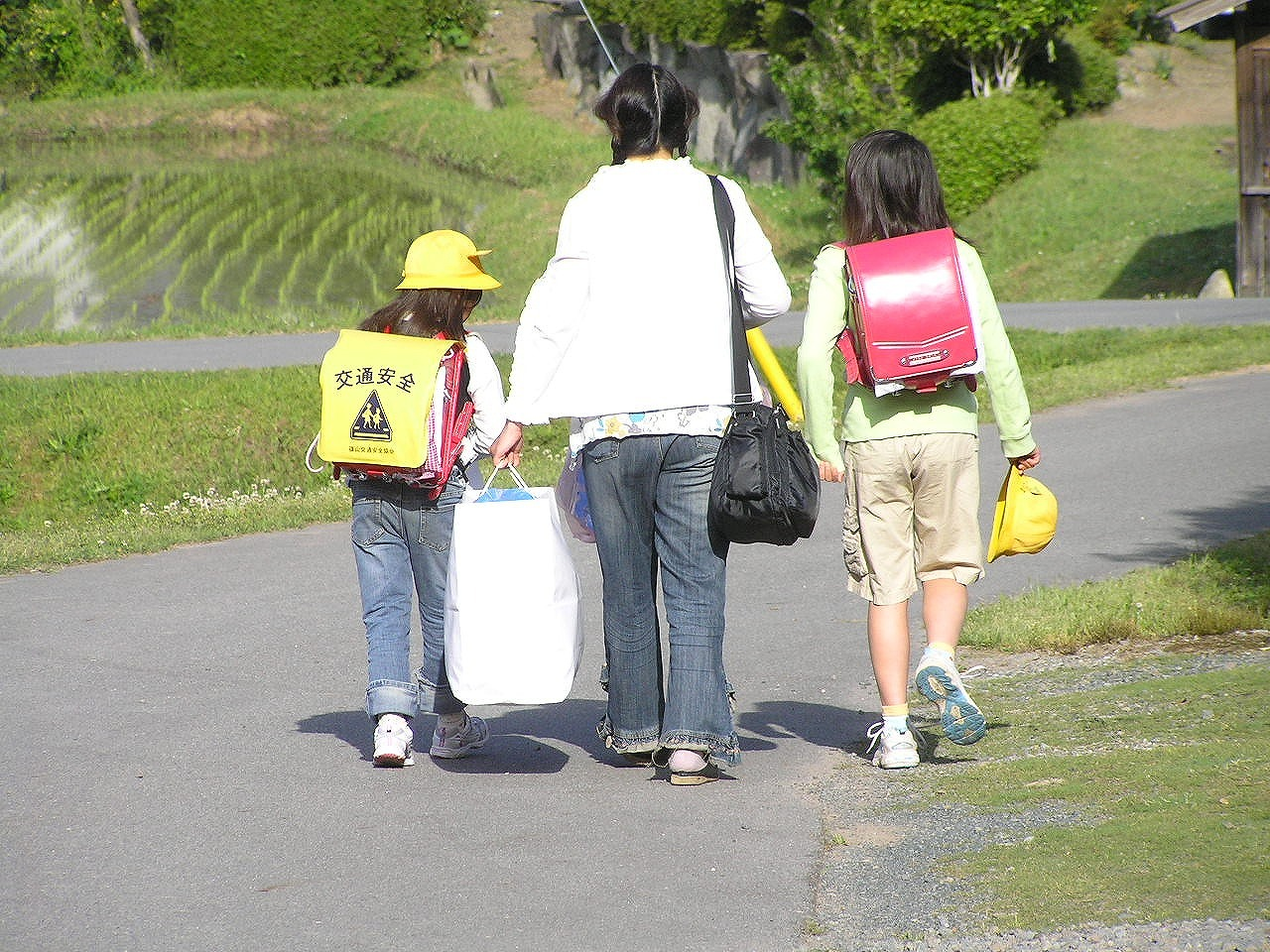
Two sisters wearing pink randoseru. One of them with a yellow plastic cover worn by 1st graders.

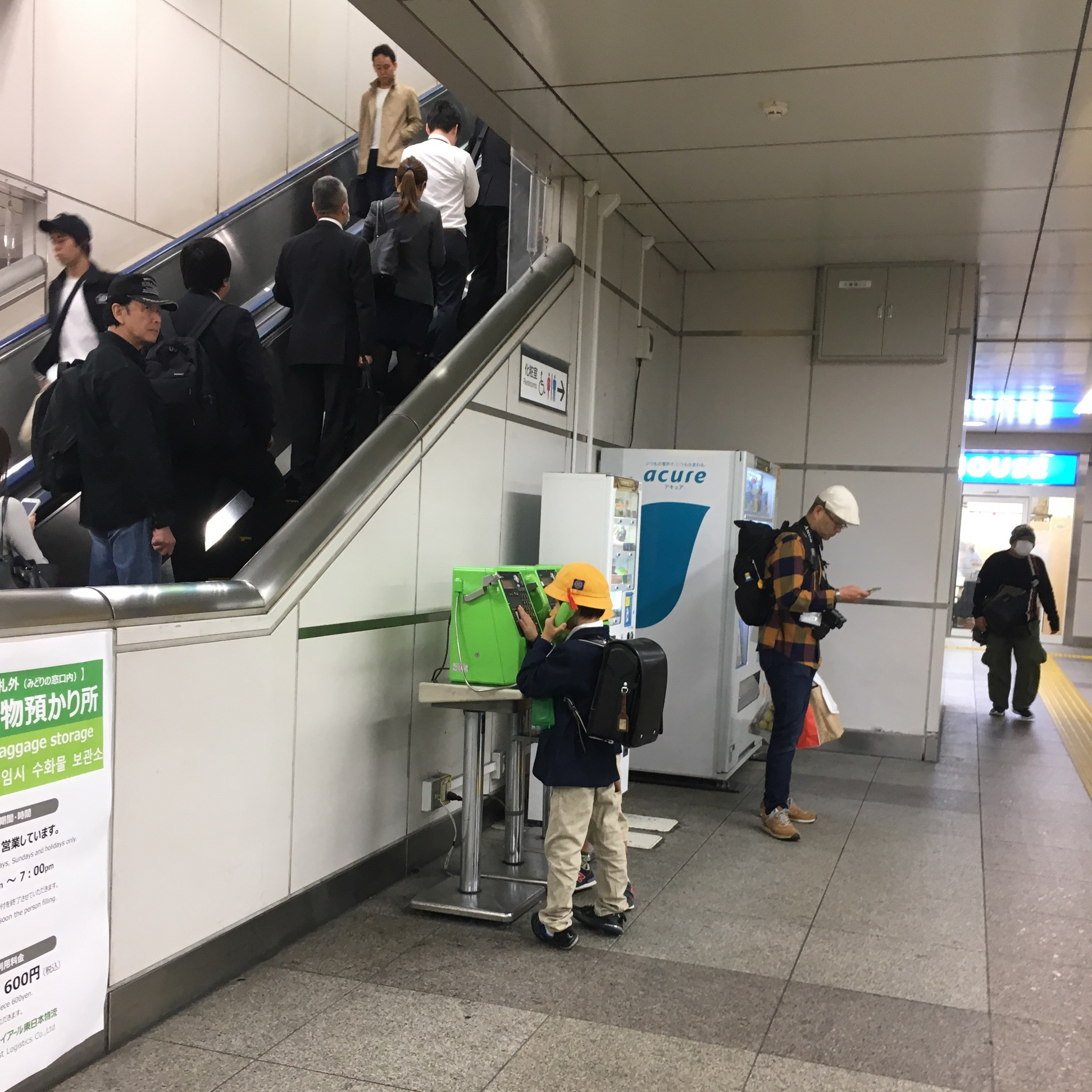
Boy with black randoseru, 2018.

== See also ==
- Culture of Japan
- Japanese words of Dutch origin
- Recorder to Randoseru
