= Mitre Sports International =

English sports equipment brand

Mitre
- Company type: Subsidiary
- Industry: Sports equipment, textile
- Founded: 1817; 209 years ago in Huddersfield, England
- Headquarters: Wakefield, England
- Area served: Worldwide
- Products: Football balls and uniforms, rugby balls, sportswear, apparel, accessories
- Parent: Pentland Group
- Website: mitre.com

Mitre Sports International Ltd., mostly known as Mitre, is an English sports equipment manufacturer based in Wakefield. Mitre is mainly focused on association football but also providing equipment (mostly balls) for other sports. Having founded in 1817 in Huddersfield, the company is one of the oldest of its type in the world. Mitre is currently a subsidiary of the British family–owned Pentland Group.

Products manufactured and commercialised by Mitre include sports equipment for association football (balls, team uniforms, clothing lines), rugby union (balls, training shirts), basketball (balls), and netball (balls, rings). Mitre also offers a list of accessories for those sports such as bags, space markers, water bottles, safety cones, among others.

The "Delta" football has been used in some professional leagues of the United Kingdom including the Football League Cup, The Football League, Scottish Premiership, Welsh Premier Division and the Football League Trophy. Mitre also supplies many other competitions including the Isthmian League, Evo-Stik Southern League, Spartan South Midlands League and many more. These leagues play with a variety of footballs including the Delta Hyperseam, Max Hyperseam and ProMax Hyperseam. Internationally, Mitre have its footballs used across a variety of competitions around including the AFF Championship and the S.League.

== History ==
In 1817 Benjamin Crook opened his tannery in Huddersfield, England, giving his own name to the company he founded. The origin of its name is related to the longtime friendship between Crook and the bishop of the village. Crook took the ceremonial head-dress worn by bishops in traditional Christianity (the "mitre") to name his company.

The company produced footballs and rugby balls for clubs all over the world, and in 1959 Mitre expanded into cricket, soft leather and bags. Sports footwear followed a year later. Manchester United's prominent footballer Denis Law became the first official Mitre spokesman in 1964. Two years later Mitre went on to become the official ball supplier for the English Football Association, and for the next forty years, the FA Cup Final was to be played with a Mitre ball.

Muhammad Ali wore Mitre in his 59th professional fight against Leon Spinks in New Orleans, and Stuart Pearce wore Mitre football boots in 1977. Mitre was also the official ball supplier to the 1987 Rugby World Cup, jointly hosted by Australia and New Zealand. In 1992, Mitre became the official ball supplier to the newly formed FA Premier League, introducing its synthetic footballs instead of leather balls, which had been used previously. In 2003 the Mitre ball was used in the Netball World Championships held in Jamaica. The England national netball team also appeared at the tournament wearing Mitre apparel.

In 2000 Mitre arrived in Argentina, signing deals with several Primera División clubs. Newell's Old Boys, Estudiantes de La Plata, Unión de Santa Fe, Belgrano de Córdoba, Arsenal de Sarandí and Chacarita Juniors were the first teams wearing uniforms by Mitre. Football star and UNICEF goodwill ambassador George Weah teamed up with Mitre in 2004 to donate 5,000 footballs to underprivileged children in Liberia and 5,000 footballs to Iraqi children. Another endorsee joined Mitre in 2006, when Australian cricketer and record breaking test wicket-taker Shane Warne was signed to wear Mitre footwear and protection.

In 2007 Mitre launched its new "Revolve" football ball to the EFL, where each club played with its own club coloured and badged ball. This was the first time this had happened. Mitre also re-entered the apparel markets with kit deals with Ipswich Town and Huddersfield Town FC. In 2008 Mitre signed All Black player Luke McAlister to be the figurehead of its rugby range. The same year, the company signed an agreement with the El Salvador national football team to be its exclusive uniform provider. In 2009 Mitre expanded its business in South America, becoming the official uniform provider of many teams of the Chilean league.

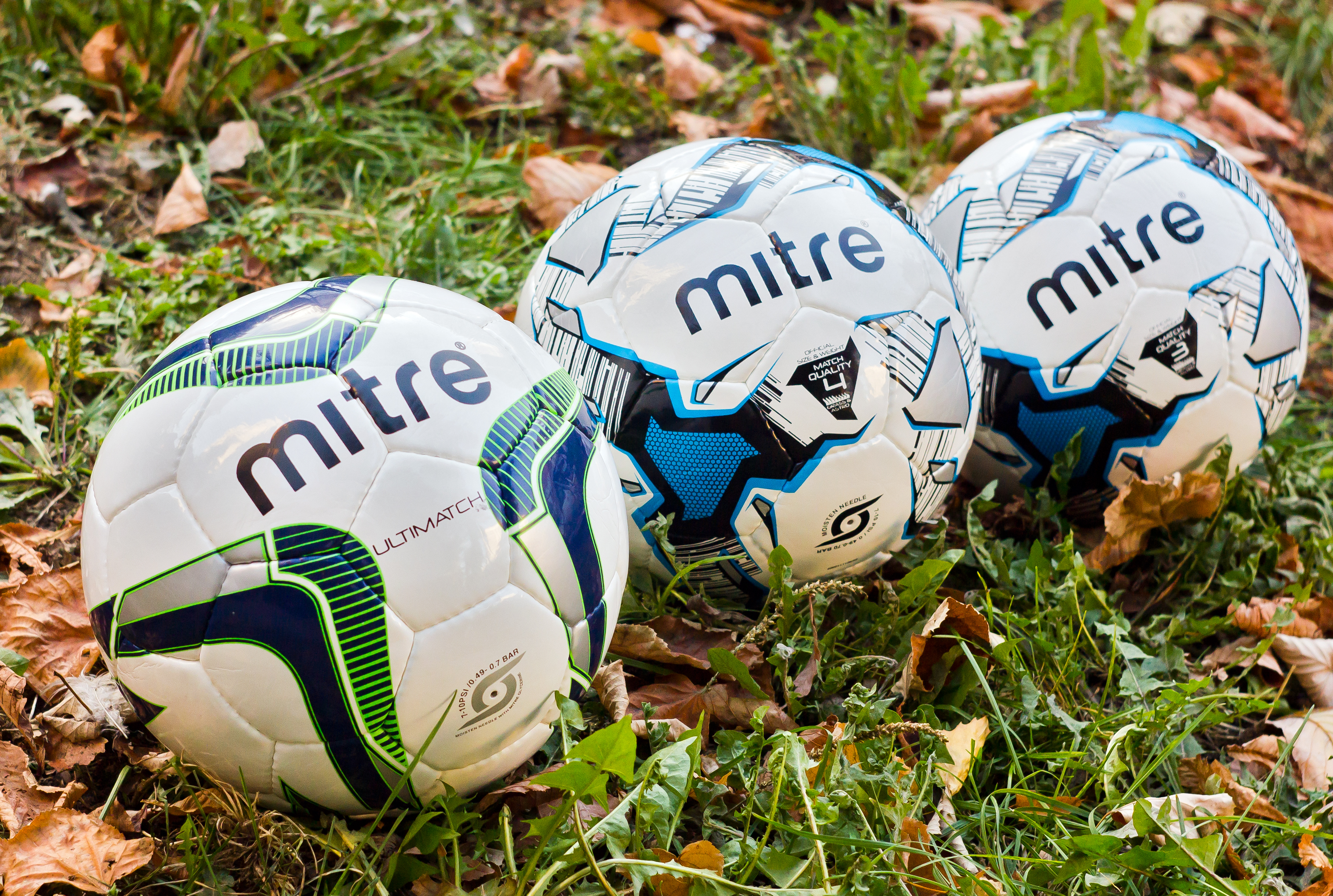
Mitre Ultimatch Footballs

In June 2011, Mitre extended its deal with the Scottish Premier League to be the official ball supplier until 2015. In 2015 Mitre released their new Hyperseam technology, which will grace The Football League and Scottish Premier League for years to come as they both announced new sponsorship deals for Mitre to continue being the official ball supplier. In 2015 Mitre also started to personalised footballs as a gift option for young football fans In 2016, Mitre announced its sponsorship deal to become the official match ball sponsor for the Singapore Professional Football League. Mitre also announced gloves sponsorship for Singaporean goalkeepers Nozawa Yosuke (Albirex Niigata Singapore), Khairulhin Khalid (Hougang United) and Beatrice Tan (Singapore women's national team). The sponsorship with Beatrice Tan marked the first time that a female footballer is being sponsored in Singapore.

In May 2017, Mitre brought back the "Delta" ball design as the official match ball of the English Football League since the 2017–18 season. The company also launched its "Legend Returns" campaign to promote the event. The football was unveiled live on Soccer AM and at Wembley Stadium.

== Products ==
The following chart contains all the product lines by Mitre.

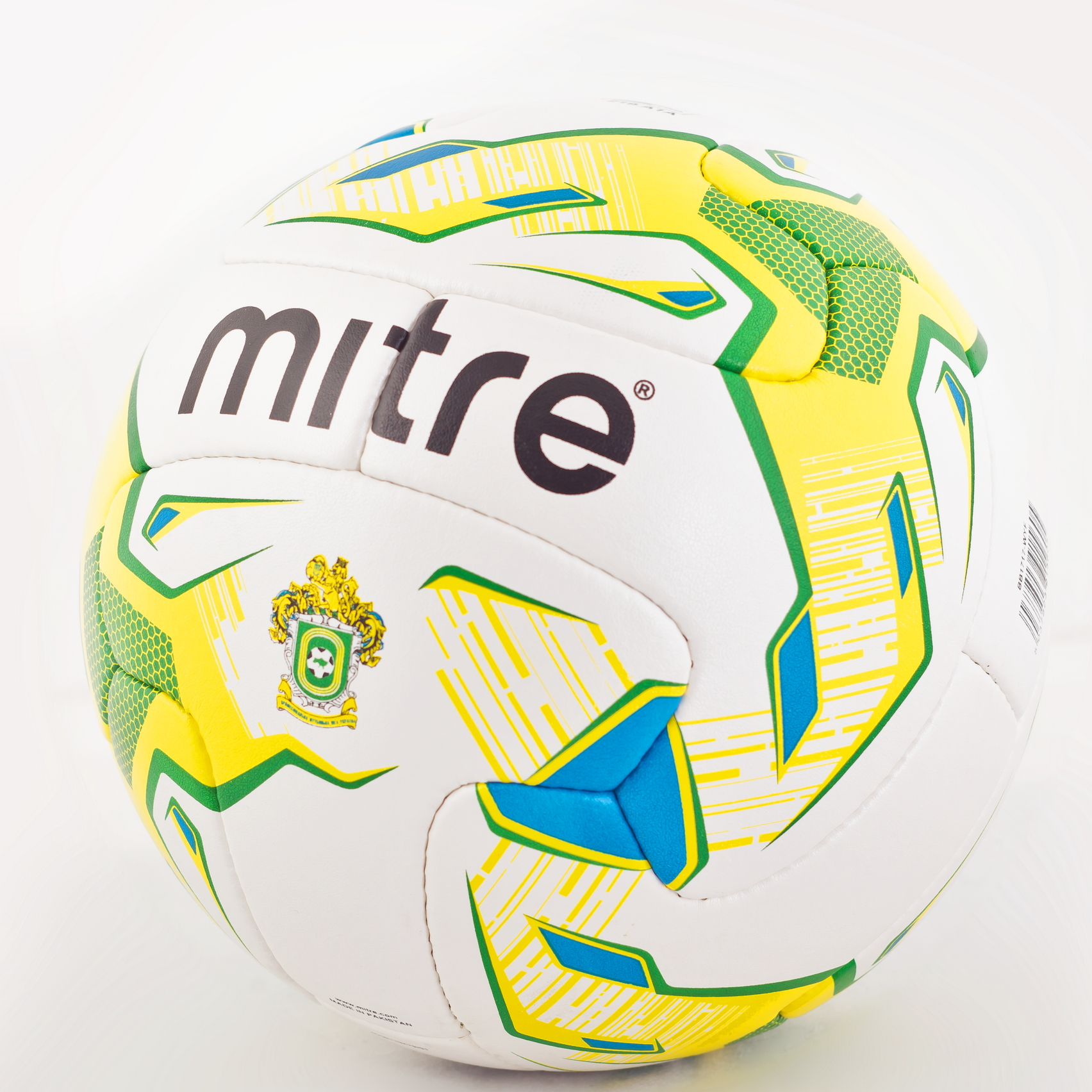
Mitre Delta V12S ball, made for PFL of Ukraine

Sport	Range of products
Football	Team uniforms, boots, goalkeeper gloves, shin guards, balls, goals, linesmman flags, cones
Basketball	Balls
Netball	Balls, rings
Rugby union	Balls, training shirts
Clothing	Jackets, raincoats, hoodies, t-shirts, polo shirts, compression garment, shorts, leggings
Accessories	Bags, pumps, water bottles, safety cones
