= Femoralia =

Coverings for the upper legs worn by men in Ancient Rome

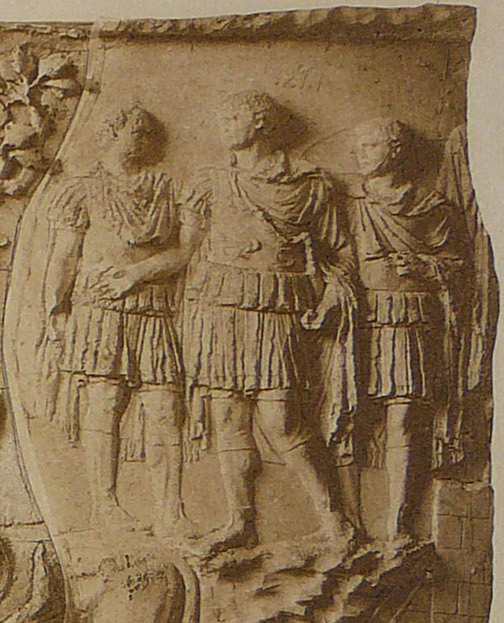

Femoralia or feminalia and tibialia were a kind of leg covering used in ancient Rome, the femoralia covering the upper leg (cf. femur) and the tibialia covering the lower leg (cf. tibia).

Femoralia are sometimes described as short trousers or breeches, and tibialia as leggings.
