= Mitre Revolve =

Association football ball

The Mitre Revolve is an association football ball made by Mitre Sports International, a British sports equipment manufacturer. It is the official ball of several football competitions, including The Football League, the Football League Cup, the Football League Trophy and the Scottish Professional Football League. Balls used by teams in the Football League Championship, Football League One and the Scottish Premiership are all given club-specific colour schemes and the club badge is featured. A generic version of the ball is used for clubs in Football League Two. Since 2009, a variation of the ball with a black-and-goal design has been used for the Football League Cup final. In the Scottish Premier League, the champions from the previous season use a gold-coloured ball in recognition of their status as champions. A high-visibility version of the ball was developed, in orange with a red and yellow pattern.

The ball features an outer layer made from Clarino microfibres and composed of 26 panels, as opposed to the 32-panel designs used by Adidas and Nike amongst others. It is claimed that the 26-panel design allows the ball to maintain its spherical shape better, with the seam pattern also allowing for more accurate control over the flight of the ball. Mitre also claim that this control is further enhanced by the ball's polyurethane coating – which keeps the ball dry and provides better grip between boot and ball – and its PVC inner layers – which transfer the momentum from the player's foot to the ball with greater efficiency. The design on the ball's surface is based on thermal images of global wind patterns.
