= ISKO (clothing company) =

Textile company

iSKO
- Industry: manufacturing distributor
- Founded: 1983
- Founder: Sani Konukoglu
- Headquarters: Bursa, Turkey
- Key people: Fatih Konukoglu(CEO); Abdulkadir Konukoglu(Chairman of the Board); Zekeriye Konukoglu(President)
- Products: denim
- Website: iskodenim.com

ISKO is a textile manufacturer and distributor and the world's largest producer of denim, producing over 250 million meters of denim annually, which it distributes to more than 60 countries worldwide.

== History ==
ISKO was founded in 1983 as a division of Sanko Textile Industries, a member of Sanko Group, a family-held, diversified, multinational company, with 12 divisions, including textiles, renewable energy, construction, packaging and financial activities.

Sanko Textile Industries was founded in 1904 by Sani Konukoğlu, who started the company with a single hand-loom. In 1943, his grandson, Sani Konukoğlu, inherited the business and expanded the textiles division, founding the current parent company, Sanko Group

== Leadership ==
ISKO is a family-run business, led by sons of Sanko Group's founder Sani Konukoğlu: CEO, Fatih Konukoğlu, who graduated from Bolton University with a degree in Textile Engineering; Abdülkadir Konukoglu, honorary chairman of the Board of Sanko Group; and Zekeriye Konukoglu, President of Sanko Group.

== Research ==
ISKO's Research & Development facility is Turkey's first government-certified textile research center and has divisions specializing in biology, chemistry and physics research as well as textile development. ISKO-owned Iskoteca, in San Benedetto del Tronto, Italy, is a research and development lab developing new treatments and finishes. In 2011 ISKO opened a second research center in Castelfranco Veneto.

== Sustainability and organic textiles ==
ISKO has certification for its sustainable products, including the Oeko-tex Standard 100 certification, the GOTS (Global Organic Textile Standard) certification for products made with 100% organic cotton, the OEP (Organic Exchange Products) certification, and the ISO 9001 and 9002B certifications.

In November 2024, they introduced a more sustainable fabric production, with its SS26 collection entirely made of innovative Next-Gen materials.

== Trademarks and patents ==
ISKO holds 10 international patents and patent-pending technologies with more than 35 registered and trademarked brands including: Jeggings, a hybrid of denim and legging material, Turbotech, ISKO Future Face, Recall, a spinning technology that allows a much faster recovery than conventional fabrics, and ISKO Reform, a very stretchable denim that incorporates a hidden synthetic inside the cotton yarn which creates a spring-like construction.

== Training and education ==
In 2013 ISKO-launched the I-SKOOL project, an annual denim industry training program and competition for designers and marketing professionals, culminating in an awards show, in collaboration with 14 international design schools, including Istituto Marangoni, ESMOD Munich, Istanbul Moda Academy, London College of Fashion, and Chelsea College of Arts.

ISKO participates in the biennial Copenhagen Summit, where it sponsors the Denim Challenge, which gives five emerging designers the opportunity to work at ISKO's research and development facility in Castelfranco Veneto.

== Philanthropy ==
In 2013, ISKO's holding company, Sanko Group, established a university, The Sanko University, a research university that specializes in medical and health Sciences with a Faculties of Medicine, Health Sciences, and Dentistry, and Institutes of Health Sciences and of Science and Technology.
