= Synonymy in Japanese =

There are many synonyms in Japanese because the Japanese language draws from several different languages for loanwords, notably Chinese and English, as well as its own native words. In Japanese, synonyms are called dōgigo (kanji: 同義語) or ruigigo (kanji: 類義語).

Full synonymy, however, is rare. In general, native Japanese words may have broader meanings than those that are borrowed; among these, Sino-Japanese words tend to suggest a more formal tone, while Western borrowed words (especially English) sound more modern.

== Yamato kotoba vs. kango vs. gairaigo ==
The table below compares native Japanese words, inherited from Old Japanese – yamato kotoba – with words borrowed from Chinese – kango – and loanwords from other languages – gairaigo.

Yamato kotoba	Kango	Gairaigo (katakana / rōmaji)	Meaning
(kanji+hiragana / hiragana only / rōmaji)		Gairaigo (katakana / rōmaji)	Meaning
大きさ / おおきさ / ōkisa	大小 / だいしょう / daishō	サイズ / saizu	size
速さ / はやさ / hayasa	速度 / そくど / sokudo	スピード / supīdo	speed
殺し屋 / ころしや / koroshiya	殺人者 / さつじんしゃ / satsujinsha	キラー / kirā	killer

== Native synonyms ==
Word #1	Word #2 (more colloquial)	Meaning
(kanji+hiragana / hiragana only / rōmaji)		Meaning
食べる / たべる / taberu	食う / くう / kuu	to eat
走る / はしる / hashiru	駆ける / かける / kakeru	to run
話す / はなす / hanasu	喋る / しゃべる / shaberu	to talk

== See also ==
- Loanwords in Japanese
- Sino-Japanese vocabulary
- List of Japanese words of Dutch origin
- List of Japanese words of Portuguese origin
- List of gairaigo and wasei-eigo terms
