= List of gairaigo and wasei-eigo terms =

Japanese loanwords

Gairaigo are Japanese words originating from, or based on, foreign-language, generally Western, terms. These include wasei-eigo (Japanese pseudo-anglicisms). Many of these loanwords derive from Portuguese, due to Portugal's early role in Japanese-Western interaction; Dutch, due to the Netherlands' relationship with Japan amidst the isolationist policy of sakoku during the Edo period; and from French and German, due to France and Germany's cultural and scientific prominence during Japan's modernization in the Meiji period.

Most come from English, the dominant world language today. Due to the large number of western concepts imported into Japanese culture during modern times, there are thousands of these English borrowings. These English words are informally referred to as having been "Nipponized". A few of them, such as "salaryman", have been borrowed into English, together with their Japanese meanings.

Japanese vocabulary includes large numbers of words from Chinese, borrowed at various points throughout history. However, since the Japanese language has such strong historical ties to the Chinese language, these loans are not generally considered gairaigo.

Many loanwords are pseudo-borrowings: despite their links to foreign language words, the word forms as used in modern Japanese, are not used in the same way in their languages of origin. Many such terms, despite their similarity to the original foreign words, are not easily understood by speakers of those languages, e.g. left over as a baseball term for a hit that goes over the left-fielder's head, rather than uneaten food saved for a later meal as in English—or famikon, ファミコン, from "family computer", which actually refers to the Nintendo Entertainment System.

Note:
US = American English
UK = British English

== Examples ==
Due to the extent of Japanese borrowings, particularly from English, this list focuses mainly on pseudo-borrowings and commonly used loanwords from languages other than English, which are often mistaken for English words in Japan. Most loanwords, and all modern loans, are transcribed in katakana, a Japanese syllabary. Older loans may be written using ateji, with Kanji used to represent their phonetic readings without necessarily inheriting their meaning.

In words composed of both a loan and native Japanese, the Japanese can function as a morpheme within a compound, and would generally be written in Kanji if possible, or can be attached to the foreign word to inflect or otherwise modify it, as if it were okurigana, which is written in hiragana.

Japanese	Hepburn romanization	Origin	Meaning	Language of origin
アベック	abekku	avec (meaning 'with')	romantic couple	French
アフレコ	afu-reko	af(ter) + recor(ding)	postrecording, dubbing	English
アフターサービス	afutā sābisu	after service	customer service, user support, after-care, service	English
アイドル	aidoru	idol	(teen) idol, pop star	English
アイス, アイスクリーム	aisu, aisu kurīmu	ice/Eis, ice cream	ice; ice cream	English / German
アイスキャンディー	aisu-kyandī	ice + candy	popsicle, ice lolly	English
アイゼン	aizen	(Steig)eisen (meaning 'climbing iron' or 'crampon')	crampons	German
アーカイブ	ākaibu	archive	archive	English
アメフト (from アメリカン フトボール)	amefuto	Ame(rican) foot(ball)	American football	English
アメリカンドッグ	amerikan doggu	American dog	corn dog	English
アニメ (from アニメーション)	anime	anima(tion), anime	animation, animated cartoons or films (although anime has been reborrowed into English with a meaning of "Japanese animation", in Japanese the term refers to all animation)	English
アニソン (from アニメソング)	anison	ani(me) + son(g)	an anime song, most often the theme	English
アンジェル	anjeru	angel	angel	English
アンケート	ankēto	enquête	questionnaire, survey	French
アンニュイ	annyui	ennui	ennui, boredom	French
アンサー	ansā	answer	reply to a question, solution to a problem	English
アンチ	anchi	anti-	hater, anti-fan	English
アパート	apāto	apart(ment)	apartment (US), flat (UK), though apāto are usually in small two-story wood-structure buildings, not multistory complexes as in the US usage (see manshon loanword)	English (US)
アポ	apo	appo(intment)	appointment	English
アップル	appuru	apple	apple	English
〜アップ	-appu	up(grade)	to upgrade or improve (something). Coupled with English or pseudo-English nouns that indicate what that something is; e.g., version-up: upgrade (software), buy the next-better version or model of something, improve the appearance of something; image-up: improve the image of, improve one's outward appearance; "weight-up": to gain weight; manner-up: improve one's manners, learn (proper/better) manners or etiquette; power-up: an object that instantly benefits or adds extra abilities to a video game character; base-up, level-up: take to the next or a higher (basic) level of quality; also base-up (frequently abbreviated bea): to raise the base wage of the workers	English
アロエ	aroe	aloë	aloe	Dutch
アルバイト or バイト	arubaito or baito	Arbeit (meaning 'work')	part-time job	German
アールブイ	ārubui	RV	truck, van, SUV, recreational vehicle	English
アルコール	arukōru	alcohol, álcool	alcohol, alcoholic beverage	English (from Arabic)
アウトコース	autokōsu	out-course	outside	English
バッド	baddo	bad	bad	English
バーゲン	bāgen	bargain	a sale at a store	English
バイキング	baikingu	viking	smorgasbord, buffet. (Supposedly named after the restaurant "Imperial Viking" in the Imperial Hotel, the first restaurant in Japan to serve buffet-style meals and named after the US film The Vikings)	English
バイク	baiku	bike	a motorcycle, but not a bicycle	English
バカンス	bakansu	vacances	holiday, vacation	French
ブルー	burū	blue	blue	English
ブックカバー	bukku kabā	book cover	dust jacket	English
バックミラー	bakku mirā	back mirror	rear-view mirror	English
バックナンバー	bakku nanbā	back number	back issue (US), back number (UK)	English
バックネット	bakku netto	back net	a backstop (in baseball)	English
バンパー	banpā	bumper	a horizontal bar fixed across the front or back of a motor vehicle to reduce damage in a collision or as a trim	English
バリアフリー	baria furī	barrier-free	accessible facilities for handicapped persons	English
バリカン	barikan	Bariquand et Marre	hand-operated or electric hair trimmer	French
バスジャック	basu jakku	bus (hi)jack	a bus hijacking (possibly based on the English term "carjack")	English (US)
バター	batā	butter	butter, sometimes used on food packaging for margarine	English
バッティング	battingu	batting or butting	Swing the bat in baseball; or, to project forward or propose competitively on business or others by two or more parties, like "butting heads" by animals.	English
ベビーカー	bebī kā	baby car	stroller (US), pushchair or pram (UK)	English
ベッドタウン	beddo taun	bed town	bedroom suburbs, bedroom community, dormitory suburb, commuter town	English
ベジタリアン	bejitarian	vegetarian	vegetarian	English
ビー玉	bīdama	vi(dro) (glass) + 玉 (dama, ball)	marbles	Portuguese + Japanese
ビジネスホテル	bijinesu hoteru	business hotel	budget hotel	English
ビロード	birōdo	veludo	velvet	Portuguese
ビル	biru	buil(ding)	building (especially modern steel-and-concrete buildings)	English
ビール	bīru	bier	beer	Dutch
ボンベ	bonbe	Bombe	a steel canister for storing pressurized gas, such as a propane tank	German
ボールペン	bōru pen	ball(point) pen	a ballpoint pen	English
ボタン	botan	botão	button	Portuguese
ブラセラ or ブルセラ	burasera or burusera	bloo(mer) sailor	panty fetishism, especially with teenage girls wearing school outfits ("sailor suits") and bloomers.	English
ブレザー	burezā	blazer	blazer, or a Japanese school uniform that includes that garment. It usually has buttons down the front and a vest under it with a white collared shirt.	English
ブルマ	buruma	bloomers	short pants worn for exercise by girls, usually in PE class in high school	English
キャビンアテンダント	kyabin atendanto (abbr. "CA")	cabin attendant	A flight attendant	English
チャージ	chāji	charge	to top up, to add value, used for e-payment	English
チャームポイント	chāmupointo	charm point	most attractive feature (of a person)	English
チャンプルー	chanpurū	campur	stir fry dish from Okinawa	Malay / Indonesian
チャレンジ	charenji	challenge	duel, contest, competition	English
チェンジレバー	chenji-rebā	change + lever	gearshift, gear lever, gear stick	English
チェリーボーイ	cherī bōi	cherry boy	a male virgin	English
チアガール, チアマン, チアリーダー	chia gāru, chia man, chia rīdā	cheer girl, cheer man, cheerleader	(female), (male) cheerleader	English
チンキ	chinki	tinktuur	tincture	Dutch
チューハイ or 酎ハイ	chūhai	酎 ((shō)chū) + high(ball)	a kind of alcoholic drink from Japan	Japanese + English
コラボ	korabo	collab(orations)	collaboration; crossover	English
コンピューター or コンピュータ	konpyūtā or konpyūta	computer	computer	English
ダブル (noun), ダブる (intransitive verb). Also: "W"	daburu	double	(noun and adjective) double; double-breasted (jacket), or turn-ups (cuffs) on trousers; (verb) to be redundant or doubled	English
ダンス	dansu	dance	dance	English
ダンプカー	danpu kā	dump car	dump truck (US), dumper (UK)	English
ダストボックス	dasuto bokkusu	dust box	rubbish bin (UK), garbage can (US)	English
ダストシュート	dasuto shūto	dust chute	garbage chute	English
ダッチワイフ	datchi-waifu	Dutch + wife	sex doll	English
ダウンロードオンリーメンバー	daunrōdo onrī menbā	download-only member	a computing leech	English
〜ティック or 〜チック	-tikku or -chikku	"-tic", as in (roman)tic, (drama)tic	-esque, attached to a noun. For example, a product with cute character illustrations may be considered "Akihabara-chikku". (This is rebracketing, as the actual productive English suffix is -ic. The t is these English words are part of their Latin/Greek etymons' stems.)	English
デッドボール	deddo bōru	dead ball	hit by a pitch	English
デフォルト	deforuto	default	ordinary option	English
デコレーションケーキ	dekorēshon kēki	decoration cake	a fancy cake	English
電子レンジ or レンジ	denshi renji or renji	電子 (denshi, electronic) + range	a microwave oven	Japanese + English
デパート	depāto	depart(ment store)	department store	English
デパ地下	depa chika	depa(rtment store) + 地下 (chika, underground)	a shopping area, often focused on food and located adjacent to train stations, found in major cities in Japan	English + Japanese
デリバリーヘルス	deribarī herusu	delivery health	a form of prostitution, essentially a call girl or escort service	English
デッサン	dessan	dessin	line drawing, sketch	French
デスク	desuku	desk	an editor for a certain section of a publication. (Derived from desk’s meaning as a division of specialization in a newsroom, e.g., "the sports desk".) A desk.	English
ドアカット	doakatto	door + cut	selective door operation	English
ドイツ	doitsu	Duits(land), Deutsch(land)	Germany	Dutch, German
ドクター ストップ	dokutā sutoppu	doctor stop	a doctor's order / advice / recommendation to a patient to cease doing something (e.g., smoking or drinking alcohol)	English
ドンマイ	donmai	don('t) mi(nd)	"don't worry about it", "don't pay (that) any mind", "it's/I'm OK", "no problem". Used when something goes wrong.	English
ドライバー	doraibā	driver	a screwdriver; motor vehicle driver	English
ドライブイン	doraibuin	drive in	rest area, motor lodge, drive-in	English
ドラマ	dorama	drama	TV drama, soap opera	English / Spanish / Latin
ドリフト	dorifuto	drift	drifting (when a car is in a controlled skid)	English
エアコン	eakon	air con(ditioning) / con(ditioner)	air conditioning or air conditioner (may refer to both heating and cooling functions)	English
AV	ēbui or ēvui	wasei-eigo AV	adult video; audiovisual (audio-video)	English
エキス	ekisu	ex(tract)	extract	Dutch
エネルギー	enerugī	Energie	energy	German
エネルギッシュ	enerugisshu	energisch	energetic	German
エンスト	ensuto	en(gine) sto(p)	stall (as in an automobile engine)	English
NG	enu-jī	n(ot) + g(ood)	not good or no good, acronym	English
エレベーター	erebētā	elevator	elevator (US), lift (UK)	English (US)
エロ	ero	ero(s)	erotic	Greek / English / Spanish
エログ	erogu	ero(tic) + (b)log	erotic blog, adult-oriented blog	English
エログロ	eroguro	ero(tic) gro(tesque)	an artistic movement featuring "erotic grotesque nonsense" that emerged in Japan in the early 20th century	English
エール	ēru	yell	(1) to cheer on a player in a sports competition; (2) to express support for a candidate in an election	English
LLC	eruerushī	acronym for "long-life coolant"	antifreeze coolants	English
エスケープ	esukēpu	escape	run away	English
エステ	esute	esthé(tique)	beauty salon, esthetic clinic	French
ファイナル	fainaru	final	last	English
ファイト	faito	fight	often used to mean "Do your best!" or "I'll do my best."	English
ファミコン	famikon, Famicom	fami(ly) com(puter)	the Nintendo Entertainment System, known as the Family Computer in Japan. Also a catch-all term by the older generation for any gaming console.	English
ファンファーレ	fanfāre	Fanfare	a musical fanfare	German
ファンタジック	fantajikku	fantasy + -ic	fantastic	English
ファッションヘルス	fasshon herusu	fashion health	a form of brothel	English
フェッチ	fetchi	fetch	(computer jargon) To fetch an instruction from main memory when a microprocessor executes a command	English
～フェチ	fechi	feti(sh)	fetish (a sexual fetish or just a distinctive preference)	English
フィリピンパブ	firipin-pabu	Philippines + pub	a bar with Filipino staff	English
フォアボール	foabōru	four ball	base on balls (baseball term)	English
フライ	furai	fly	fly ball (baseball term)	English
フライ	furai	fry	deep frying	English
フライパン	furaipan	fry + pan	frying pan	English
フライドポテト	furaido poteto	fried potato	french fries (US), chips (UK)	English
フライング(スタート)	furaingu (sutāto)	flying (start)	premature start, breakaway	English
フライングゲット	furaingu getto	flying get	to purchase an item before its official release date	English
フラクタル	furakutaru	fractal	fractal	English
フリーダイアル or フリーダイヤル, フリーコール	furī daiaru or furī daiyaru, furī kōru	free dial, free call	toll-free call	English
フリーサイズ	furī saizu	free size	one-size-fits-all	English
フリーター	furītā	free Arbeiter ("worker") or: free time	underemployed young adults, people who opt to work (a series of) part-time jobs rather than engage in permanent employment	English + German
フロント	furonto	front (desk)	the reception desk, e.g. at a hotel or a sentō	English
フロントガラス	furonto garasu	front glass	windshield (US), windscreen (UK)	English
フルベース	furu bēsu	full base	bases loaded	English
ガードマン	gādo man	guard man	a (private) security guard, a person who directs traffic around work sites	English
ガラス or 硝子	garasu	glas or glass	glass (material)	Dutch / English
ガソリンスタンド	gasorin sutando	gasoline stand	gas station (US), petrol station (UK)	English
ガタパーチャ	gata pācha	getah perca or gutta percha	a hard tough thermoplastic substance which is the coagulated latex of certain Malaysian trees	Malay / Indonesian via English
ガッツポーズ	gattsu pōzu	guts pose	fist pump, victory pose, named for boxer Guts Ishimatsu	English
ガーゼ	gāze	Gaze	gauze	German
ゲームクリエーター	gēmu kuriētā	game creator	game developer	English
ゲームセンター or ゲーセン	gēmu sentā or gēsen	game centre	video arcade	English
ゲームセット	gēmu setto	Game, set(, match)	announcement for the conclusion of a competition. Used in sports, as well as some video games (such as Super Smash Bros.)	English
ゲレンデ	gerende	Gelände (meaning 'site; ground; premises')	ski slope	German
ギブ(アップ)	gibu(appu)	give (up)	to give up	English
ギプス or ギブス	gipusu or gibusu	Gips	cast (gipusu also means a plaster cast, while gibusu refers to a plastic brace)	German
ゴム	gomu	gom	rubber, eraser, rubber band	Dutch
ゴールデンアワー or ゴールデンタイム	gōruden awā or gōruden taimu	golden hour or golden time	prime time in Japanese television	English
ゴールデンウィーク or ゴールデンウイーク	gōruden wīku or gōruden uīku	golden week	A week of holidays in Japan, Golden Week.	English
ググる	guguru	Goog(le) + -ru (Japanese verb ending)	to google (i.e., to search online using a search engine)	English + Japanese
グラビア	gurabia	gravure	glamour photography	English
グラス	gurasu	glass	drinking glass	English
グロ	guro	gro(tesque)	grotesque	English
ギャラリー	gyararī	gallery	an art gallery, audience, or a pool of celebrities on a program.	English
ギャル	gyaru	gal	a young woman who belongs to the gyaru subculture	English
ハイカラ	haikara	high colla(r)	(1920s slang) a person who was devoted to Western fashions, trends and values. E.g., manga/anime Haikara-san ga Tōru ("Here Comes Miss High-Collar").	English
ハイネック	hainekku	high neck	A turtleneck style shirt or sweater	English
ハイオク	haioku	high octane	high-octane gasoline	English
ハイタッチ	haitatchi	high touch	high five	English
ハッカー	hakkā	hacker	refers specifically to a computer black hat	English
ハモる	hamoru	harmo(ny) + -ru (Japanese verb ending)	to harmonize (when singing)	English + Japanese
ハンバーグ	hanbāgu	hamburg(er steak)	Salisbury steak (culinary term)	English
ハンチング帽	hanchingu-bō	hunting + 帽 (bō, hat, cap)	deerstalker cap, hunting cap	English + Japanese
ハンドル	handoru	handle	steering wheel or bicycle handlebars	English
ハンドルキーパー	handoru kīpā	handle keeper	designated driver	English
ハンドルネーム	handoru nēmu	handle name	handle, screen name	English
ハンカチ	hankachi	han(d)kerchie(f)	handkerchief	English
ハンスト	hansuto	hun(ger) st(rike)	hunger strike	English
ハッピーエンド	happī endo	happy end	a happy ending	English
ハウス (ビニールハウス)	hausu (binīru hausu)	house (vinyl house)	greenhouse or glasshouse	English
ハザードランプ	hazādo ranpu	hazard lamp	hazard flashers or hazard lights	English
ヘアピンカーブ	heapin kābu	hairpin curve	hairpin turn	English
ヘルスメーター	herusu mētā	health meter	bathroom scales, scales	English
ヒステリー	hisuterī	Hysterie	loss of (self-)control	German
ヒップ	hippu	Hips	buttocks, butt	English
ヒップホップ	hippuhoppu	hiphop	hiphop	English
ヒーリング	hīringu	healing	healing (psychological process)	English
ホルモン	horumon	Hormon	hormone; also offal when served for yakiniku or hotpot	German
ホース	hōsu	hoos	a hose	Dutch
ホッチキス	hotchikisu	Hotchkiss	stapler (a genericized trademark of the E. H. Hotchkiss company, also used in Korea)	English
ホテヘルス	hote-herusu	hote(l) + health	erotic massage provided in a hotel room	English
ホテトル	hote-toru	hote(l) + Tur(kish bath)	sexual services provided in a hotel room	English
ホットケーキ	hotto kēki	hotcake	a pancake, hotcake	English
ホーム	hōmu	(plat)form	a railway platform	English
ホワイトデー	howaito dē	White + Day	White Day, a month after Valentine's Day	English
イエス	iesu	Jesus	Jesus	Greek (reconstructed)
イエスー	iesū	yes	yes	English
イギリス	igirisu	^{*}inglês or inglés	English, England or the United Kingdom	^{*}Portuguese and Spanish
イクラ	ikura	икра (ikra, meaning 'caviar')	salmon roe	Russian
イメージ	imēji	image	an image, often used to indicate an artist's rendering or a graphic intended to provide a conceptual image of a situation; especially in advertising and design, a conceptual description intended to conjure a mental image of an abstract situation; (the public's) impression or perception of an entity.	English
イメージクラブ	imēji-kurabu	image + club	a type of brothel in which the staff dress in costumes (schoolgirl, nurse, etc.)	English
インスタ	insuta	Insta(gram)	Instagram	English
インフレ	infure	infla(tion)	inflation	English
イン・キー	in kī	in key	locking one's car keys inside of one's car	English
イラスト	irasuto	illust(ration)	an illustration	English
イスパニア or イスパニャ (Note: Japanese obsolete term for Spain now replaced with Supein (スペイン))	isupania or isupanya	Espanha or Hispania	Spain	Portuguese / Latin
インターネット	intānetto	internet	internet	English
イヤー・オブ・ザ・コーチ	iyā obu za kōchi	year of the coach	coach of the year (a title given to coaches by Asahi Shimbun and the High School Baseball Federation from 2003 to 2005)	English
ジャンパー	janpā	jumper	jacket, jumper (ski jumping athlete)	English
ジャンプ	janpu	jump	jump	English
ジェンダーフリー	jendā furī	gender free	gender equality, gender blind	English
ジェットコースター	jetto kōsutā	jet coaster	roller coaster	English
ジンギスカン	jingisukan	Genghis Khan	jingisukan (Mongolian-style barbecue with cut lamb and vegetables)	Mongolian
ジングルベル	jinguruberu	jingle + bell	Jingle Bells	English
ジーパン	jīpan	jea(ns) + pan(ts)	jeans	English
ジープ	jīpu	jeep	a small, sturdy motor vehicle with four-wheel drive, especially one used by the military	English
ジュース	jūsu	juice	(1) juice; (2) soda or energy drinks, regardless of whether they contain any juice	English
カーセックス	kā-sekkusu	car + sex	public sex (in a car)	English
カチューシャ	kachūsha	Katyusha, a character in the novel Resurrection	Alice band: horseshoe-shaped hairband made of metal or plastic (often covered with cloth). However, in Russian it is ободок (obodók).	Russian
カメラマン	kameraman	cameraman	photographer or cameraman	English
カモン or カモーン	kamon or kamōn	come on	An invitation to join an activity or event.	English
カン or 缶	kan	kan	can (beverage can or tin can)	Dutch
カンニング	kanningu	cunning	cheating	English
カッパ or 合羽	kappa	capa (de chuva), capa (de lluvia)	(rain) coat	Portuguese / Spanish
カラン	karan	kraan	faucet (US), tap (UK)	Dutch
カラオケ	karaoke	空 (kara, empty) + orche(stra)	karaoke	Japanese + English
カリウム or カリ or 加里	kariumu or kari	kalium	potassium	Dutch
カルキ	karuki	kalk	lime (mineral)	Dutch
カルピス	karupisu	cal(cium) + सर पिस (sar)pis (Sanskrit for "good taste")	Calpis (a brand of soft drink that uses milk as a key ingredient)	English + Sanskrit
カルタ	karuta	carta	karuta (Japanese playing cards)	Portuguese / Spanish
カルテ	karute	Karte	(a patient's) medical record	German
カシューナッツ	Kashū nattsu	cashew nut	cashew	English
カステラ	kasutera	(pão de) Castela (bread from Castile)	castella, a kind of sponge cake at festivals and a street food in Japan	Portuguese
カタルシス	katarushisu	katharsis (κάθαρσις)	catharsis, purification, purgation	Greek
キーホルダー	kī horudā	key holder	key ring or key chain	English
キリスト or 基督	kirisuto	Cristo	Christ	^{*}Portuguese / Spanish
キスマーク	kisu māku	kiss mark	hickey	English
キッチンペーパー	kitchin pēpā	kitchen paper	paper towel	English
コード	kōdo	chord	chord	English
コーヒー or 珈琲	kōhī	koffie	coffee	Dutch
コインランドリー	koin randorī	coin laundry	laundromat (US), launderette (UK)	English
コインロッカー	koin rokkā	coin locker	coin-operated locker	English
コインロッカーベイビー	koin rokkā beibī	coin locker baby	Coin-operated-locker babies, babies abandoned in a coin locker	English
コック	kokku	kok	a cook	Dutch
コマーシャルメッセージ or CM	komāsharu messeji	commercial message	television advertisement	English
コミカライズ	komikaraizu	comic[al] + -ize	to make a comic strip (manga) version of an originally non-comic strip title, such as a novel, movie, or TV show.	English
コンビニ	konbini	conveni(ence store)	convenience store	English
コンビナート	konbināto	комбинат (kombinat, meaning 'combine')	combine (enterprise)	Russian
コンクール	konkūru	concours	a contest, a competition	French
コンセント	konsento	concent(ric plug)	electrical outlet	English
コント	konto	conte	a short comedy	French
コップ	koppu	copo	a glass or tumbler	Portuguese
コラーゲン	korāgen	Kollagen	collagen	German
コロッケ	korokke	croquette	croquette, a small fried roll	English
コスプレ	kosupure	cos(tume) play	cosplay (dressing up in costumes, especially from manga, anime and video games)	English
クラブ or 倶楽部	kurabu	club	a club or society	English
クラクション	kurakushon	Klaxon	horn (on an automobile)	English
クランケ	kuranke	Kranker	patient	German
クラス	kurasu	class	class	English
クレーム	kurēmu	claim	a complaint	English
クレーンゲーム	kurēn-gēmu	crane + game	claw crane (an alternate term used in Japan is "UFO catcher", derived from the Sega game of the same name)	English
クリスタル	kurisutaru	crystal	shiny or clear	English
キャバクラ	kyabakura	cabaret club	hostess club	English
キャベツ	kyabetsu	cabbage	cabbage	English
キャンペーン	kyanpēn	campaign	a sales campaign or sweepstakes	English
キャンピングカー	kyanpingu kā	camping-car	a recreational vehicle. (A pseudo-anglicism used in France)	French-made English
キャッチボール	kyatchi bōru	catch ball	the game of catch or a fast-paced conversation, especially in English	English
キャッチホン	kyatchi hon	catch phone	call waiting	English
キャッチコピー	kyatchi kopī	catch copy	tagline	English
ランド	rando	land	area of ground	English
マグカップ	magu kappu	mug cup	mug	English
マイナスドライバー	mainasu doraibā	minus driver	(flathead) screwdriver	English
マイ〜	mai~	my	Someone's own. E.g., mai būmu: personal taste; mai kã: one's own car; mai waifu : one's wife; mai hōmū: one's own house; mai pēsu: doing things at one's own (leisurely) pace, taking one's time (often somewhat derogatory). Confusingly for English speakers, this can be used to refer to someone else's car, wife, home, etc.	English
マジックインキ	majikku inki	Magic Ink	permanent marker (a genericized trademark of Uchida Yoko Co.)	English
マジックテープ	majikku tēpu	magic tape	velcro	English
ママ	mama	mamá	mom	Spanish
マンダラ or 曼陀羅	mandara	मण्डल (máṇḍala)	mandala	Sanskrit via Chinese
マニア	mania	mania	enthusiasm, enthusiast	English
マンジャカニ	manjakani	manjakani (Aleppo oak)	a species of oak, bearing galls that used for traditional medicine in Asia	Malay / Indonesian
マンション	manshon	mansion	modern concrete apartment / condominium block	English
満タン	mantan	満 (man, full) + tan(k)	full tank (as in the fuel tank of an automobile)	Japanese + English
マントル	man-toru	man(sion) + Tur(kish bath)	sexual services provided in a private apartment	English
マロン	maron	marron	chestnut, eye colour	French
マスコミ	masukomi	mass communication	mass media, the media, the press	English
マザコン	mazakon	mother com(plex)	Oedipus complex, a strong attachment to one's mother (often used derogatorily); "girly man"	English
マゾ	mazo (abbr. "M")	masochiste	masochist	French
メーカー	mēkā	maker	manufacturer	English
メモリ	memori	memory	memory	English
メンヘラ	menhera	mental health	a person (typically a woman) with a mental disorder	English
メリークリスマス	merīkurisumasu	Merry Christmas	Merry Christmas	English
メール	mēru	mail	e-mail	English
メールマガジン	mēru magajin	mail magazine	e-mail newsletter, ezine	English
メルヘン	meruhen	Märchen	fairy tale	German
メタボ	metabo	metabo(lic)	Fat around the middle, big-bellied	English
ミクスチャーロック	mikusuchā-rokku	mixture + rock	rock music with rap, hip-hop, and reggae influences; also, as a catch-all term to describe such genres as rap rock, nu metal	English
ミニアルバム	mini-arubamu	mini + album	extended play	English
ミイラ or 木乃伊	mīra	mirra (myrrh: an oil used in preservation)	a mummy	Portuguese / Spanish
ミルク	miruku	milk	milk, non-dairy creamer	English
ミシン	mishin	machine	sewing machine	English
モバイル	mobairu	mobile	mobile communications, mobile communications capability, or mobile communications devices, esp. PDAs and personal computers with wireless communications capabilities	English
モバメ	mobame	mobile + mail	mobile phone-based mailing list subscription, usually used by entertainers to share their daily activities with fans	English
モボ	mobo	mo(dern) bo(y)	(1920s slang) young men adopting western styles and behaviours	English
モガ	moga	mo(dern) gi(rl)	(1920s slang) young women adopting western styles and behaviours, flapper	English
モーニングコール	mōningu kōru	morning call	wake-up call	English
モーニングコート or モーニング	mōningu kōto or mōningu	morning coat	morning coat	English
モーニングサービス or モーニング	mōningu sābisu	morning service	breakfast special, complimentary toast, hard-boiled egg et al. that is served at cafes when a cup of coffee is ordered (only seen in some parts of Japan)	English
モラトリアム人間	moratoriamu ningen	moratorium + 人間 (ningen, person)	a person who, having completed education and other preparations, delays the transition from student to productive member of society, staying in an uncertain limbo of continued education, part-time work, and parental support (similar to freeter)	English + Japanese
モーテル	mōteru	motel	recently called as "love hotel". Does not have meaning of English "motel" used by tourists with their own vehicles.	English
ムーディ	mūdi	moody	nice	English
ムーンサルト	mūnsaruto	moon + Salto, moonsault	an artistic gymnastics maneuver. Also used to describe a professional wrestling maneuver.	English + German
ミュージック	myūjikku	music	music	English
ナイター	naitā	night + -er	a night game	English
ナンバーディスプレイ	nanbā disupurei	number display	caller ID	English
ネーム	nēmu	name	manga storyboard, rough draft (historically so that type setters could get a head start on the speech bubbles before the art was finished)	English
ナンバープレート	nanbā purēto	number plate	number plate (UK), license plate (US)	English
ナトリウム	natoriumu	Natrium	sodium (Na)	Latin via German
ナイス	naisu	nice	nice	English
ニュース	nyūsu	news	news	English
ニート or NEET	nīto	Not in Employment, Education or Training	underemployed young adults, akin to freeter	English
ノー	nō	no	no	English
ノイローゼ	noirōze	Neurose	neurosis	German
ノークレームノーリターン	nō kurēmu nō ritān	no claim, no return	sold "as is"	English
ノンステップバス	non suteppu basu	non-step bus	low-floor bus	English
ノルマ	noruma	норма (norma, meaning 'standard; norm')	quota, minimum requirement (tasks)	Russian
ノート	nōto	note	a notebook	English
ノートパソコン	nōto-pasokon	note + perso(nal) + com(puter)	laptop	English
ニューハーフ	nyūhāfu	new-half	A transgender individual that has undergone a sex change operation.	English
オーバー	ōbā	over	overreaction to a situation or the end of a dating relationship	English
オーバーライド	ōbāraido	override	override	English
オブ	obu	of	of	English
OB, OG	ōbī, ōjī	old boy, old girl	alumnus, alumna, former student; furthermore used for former sport team members, employees, politicians etc., for former members of any kind of organisation likewise	English
オーダーメード	ōdā-mēdo	order + made	bespoke (tailoring)	English
オーディエンス	ōdiensu	audience	group of people who participate in a show	English
オードブル	ōdoburu	hors-d'œuvre	hors-d'œuvre	French
オーエル	ōeru	O.L. (office lady)	female office worker, usually in a clerical or support job	English
オフ	ofu	off	a sale at a store; e.g., a "big summer off" (=big summer sale)	English
オフヴォーカル	ofu-vōkaru	off + vocal	backing track, instrumental	English
オイルショック	oiru-shokku	oil + shock	oil crisis	English
オージー	ōjī	orgy	an orgy	English
オナニー	onanī	Onanie	masturbation (see Onan)	German
オンリーワン	onrīwan	only one	(adjective) one-of-a-kind or unique; e.g., オンリーワン技術 (-gijutsu, "unique technology") or オンリーワン商品 (-shōhin, "one-of-a-kind products")	English
オペ	ope	OP (abbr. from operation)	surgical operation, minor surgery	German
オープンカー	ōpun kā	open car	convertible (automobile)	English
オーライ	ōrai	a(ll) righ(t)	all right, OK	English
オレンジ	orenji	orange	orange	English
オルゴール	orugōru	orgel	a music box or any instrument that operates off of a music roll, such as a calliope	Dutch
オートバイ	ōtobai	auto-bi(cycle)	motorcycle, motorbike	English
パイプカット	paipukatto	pipe cut	vasectomy	English
パイン	pain	pine(apple)	pineapple	English
パーマ	pāma	perma(nent wave)	perm	English
パン	pan	pão, pan	bread	Portuguese / Spanish
パネリスト	panerisuto	panelist	panelist	English
パンク	panku	punc(ture)	flat tire	English
パンスト	pansuto	pan(ty) + sto(cking)	pantyhose	English
パソコン	pasokon	perso(nal) com(puter)	PC	English
パーソナルコンピューター	pāsonaru konpyūtā	personal computer	personal computer	English
パンツ	pantsu	pants	underpants (US; simply called "pants" in the UK)	English (UK)
パパ	papa	papà or papá	dad	Italian / Spanish
ペチカ	pechika	печка (pechka, meaning 'little oven')	Russian stove	Russian
ペアルック	pea rukku	pair look	matching outfits (usually between a couple)	English
ペンギン	pengin	"penguin"	Penguin	English
ペニス	penisu	penis	the penis	English
ペンション	penshon	pension	a resort hotel / chalet / cottage	French
ペーパーカンパニー	pēpā kanpanī	paper company	dummy company, shell company	English
ペーパードライバー	pēpā doraibā	paper driver	a person who has a driver's license but does not usually drive (i.e., a driver only on paper)	English
ペパロニ, ペッペロニ	peparoni, pepperoni	pepperoni	Pepperoni	English
ペーパーテスト	pēpā tesuto	paper test	written examination/test	English
ピエロ	piero	pierrot	a clown	French
ピーマン	pīman	piment	sweet bell pepper	French
ピッケル	pikkeru	(Eis)pickel (meaning 'ice axe')	ice axe	German
ピクニック	pikunikku	picnic	meal outside	English
ピザ, ピッザ	piza, pizza	pizza	pizza	Italian
ピンサロン	pin-saron	pink + salon	sex parlor	English
ピンチ	pinchi	pinch	potentially disastrous situation (from "in a pinch")	English
ピンセット	pinsetto	pincet	tweezers	Dutch
ポエマー	poemā	poema (poem) + -er	a poet	English + Spanish
ポケベル	pokeberu	pocke(t) bell	beeper, pager	English
ポケモン	pokemon	pocke(t) mon(ster)	Pokémon	English
パンチ	panchi	punch	punch	English
ポンプ	ponpu	pomp	pump	Dutch
ポシェット	poshetto	pochette	a small bag	French
ポスト	posuto	post	a mailbox (US), a postbox (UK)	English
ポテチ	pote-chi	potato + chips	potato chips	English
プラスアルファ	purasu arufa	plus alpha (ἄλφα) (a misreading of "+ X")	in addition, a little bit more, with something else	English + Greek
プラスドライバー	purasu doraibā	plus driver	Phillips screwdriver	English
プレー, プレイ	purē, purei	play	play	English
プレイ	purei	pray	pray	English
プレイガイド	purei gaido	play + guide	(theater) ticket agency	English
プリクラ	purikura	Print Club (trademark)	Photo booth	English
プロ	puro	professional	describes a business professional or professional sports	English
プロフィール	purofīru	profil	a profile	French
プロレス	puroresu	pro(fessional) wrest(ling)	professional wrestling	English
プッシュホン	pusshu hon	push phone	push-button telephone. A genericized trademark first registered by the Nippon Telegraph and Telephone Public Corporation (電電公社, Dendenkōsha; now NTT)	English
ラブドール	rabu-dōru	love + doll	a sex doll made of silicone	English
ラブホテル	rabu hoteru	love hotel	love hotel (hotel used as a private place for couples to have sex)	English
ライバル	raibaru	rival	A fellow competitor or an enemy	English
ライブアクション	raibu akushon	live-action	animated or comic form stories made into TV shows/movies involving real actors. It's the opposite of komikarizu	English
ライブハウス	raibu hausu	live house	club with live music, rock bar	English
ライフライン	raifurain	lifeline	infrastructure	English
ラッコ	rakko	rakko	a sea otter	Ainu
ラムネ	ramune	lemona(de)	Ramune (a lemon-lime soft drink; hard, powdery candy like Rockets or Smarties)	English
ランドセル	randoseru	ransel	a hard schoolbag, worn on the back, carried by young children to school	Dutch
ランジェリーパブ	ranjerī-pabu	lingerie + pub	a public house in which the waitresses work in their underwear	English
ランニングホームラン	ranningu hōmu ran	running home run	an inside-the-park home run (baseball)	English
ランニングシャツ	ranningu shatsu	running shirt	a sleeveless T-shirt	English
ランサ	ransa	langsat	Lansium parasiticum	Malay / Indonesian
レジュメ	rejume	résumé	a resume, an outline	French
レントゲン	rentogen	Röntgen	X-ray, X-ray medical imaging	German
レースクイーン	rēsu kuīn	race queen	umbrella girls	English
レストラン	resutoran	restaurant	restaurant	French
リベンジ	ribenji	revenge	return match, rematch, chance for redemption after a failed attempt	English
リーチ	rīchi	reach	One step away from winning. Usually used in mahjong.	English
リードオンリーメンバー	rīdo onrī menbā	read-only member	an internet lurker, thought to be a pun on "read-only memory"	English
リフォーム	rifōmu	reform	remodel, renovation (as in a building)	English
リモコン	rimokon	remo(te) con(trol)	remote control	English
リンクフリー	rinku furī	link free	free to link	English
リニューアル	rinyūaru	renewal	remodeling	English
リサイクルショップ	risaikuru shoppu	recycle shop	secondhand shop (selling used or unwanted furniture, household appliances, housewares, and clothes; slightly different from non-profit or charity thrift shops in that they are fundamentally for-profit shops and perceived as one way to help reduce trash)	English
リセマラ	rise-mara	reset marathon	uninstalling and reinstalling a game in order to re-roll certain starting items or statistics until a desirable result is achieved	English
リストラ	risutora	restru(cturing)	(noun) restructuring, but with emphasis on lowering headcounts as in downsizing, termination as a redundancy; (verb) to downsize, lay off or terminate as a redundancy. When used in the passive (〜される: -sareru), to get or have been made redundant, downsized (out of a job)	English
ロードショー	rōdo shō	roadshow	premiere, especially of a film	English
ロケーションハンティング, ロケハン	rokēshon hantingu, rokehan	location hunting	location scout	English
ロマン	roman	roman	novel, something that rouses one's dreams / longings	French
ロマンスグレー	romansu gurē	romance grey	silver-gray hair	English
ロマンスカー	romansu kā	Romancecar	deluxe train (named after a series of limited express operated by the Odakyu Electric Railway)	English
ロンパリ	ronpari	Lon(don) + Paris	slang for strabismus (crosseyed, wandering eye), alluding to one eye looking toward London while the other looking toward Paris	English + French
ロープウェー	rōpuwē	ropeway	ropeway	English
ロリコン	rorikon	Loli(ta) (title of a novel by Vladimir Nabokov) com(plex)	sexual attraction to fictional and real underage girls, or ephebophilia. (reborrowed into English to refer a genre of manga-style sexual artwork involving childlike female characters)	English
ロスタイム	rosu taimu	loss time	added time, additional time	English
ルー	rū	roux	roux, most commonly used in describing the sauce of the popular dish, curry rice	French
ルポ	rupo	repo(rtage)	reportage	French
リュックサック	ryukkusakku	Rucksack	backpack, rucksack	German
サービス	sābisu	service	service, often used to describe something as being free of charge	English
サボる	saboru	sabo(tage) + -ru (Japanese verb ending)	to slack off, to shirk one's duties	French + Japanese
サド	sado (abbr. "S")	(Marquis de) Sade	sadist	French
サイドブレーキ	saido burēki	side brake	hand brake, parking brake, emergency brake	English
サイダー	saidā	cider	a kind of soda unrelated to actual cider	English
サイコ	saiko	psycho	psychopath	English
サイン	sain	sign	signature, autograph	English
サインペン	sainpen	sign pen	marker, Trade name of Pentel's	English
サンドイッチ or サンド	sandoitchi, sando	sand(wich)	sandwich	English
サンドバッグ	sandobaggu	sandbag	punching bag	English
サラダ	sarada	salada or salad	salad	Portuguese / English
サラク	saraku	salak	Salacca zalacca	Malay / Indonesian
サラリーマン	sararīman	salaried man	salaryman: a salaried office/white collar worker	English
サイエンス	saiensu	science	science	English
セックス	sekkusu	sex	sexual intercourse	English
セフレ	sefure	se(x) + frie(nd)	casual sexual partner	English
セクハラ	sekuhara	sex(ual) hara(ssment)	sexual harassment	English
セメダイン	semedain, Cemedine	ceme(nt) dyne	glue, adhesive. A genericized trademark of Cemedine Co., Ltd.	English
センス	sensu	sense	understanding of subtleties	English
セレブ	serebu	celeb(rity)	a rich person, whether or not they are famous	English
セツナ or 剎那	setsuna	क्षण (kṣaṇa)	moment	Sanskrit via Chinese
シャボン玉	shabondama	xabon ("soap" in Old Spanish) + 玉 (tama, "ball")	soap bubble	Spanish + Japanese
シャープペンシル or シャーペン	shāpu penshiru or shāpen	Shar(p) pencil	mechanical pencil (referring to Sharp, a manufacturer)	English
シャッターチャンス	shattā-chansu	shutter + chance	the perfect opportunity to take a photograph	English
シーエム	shīemu	C.M. ("commercial message")	television commercial	English
シール	shīru	seal	sticker, decal	English
シルバーシート	shirubā shīto	silver seat	priority seating on public transportation. ("Silver" refers to the hair of elderly passengers.)	English
シュークリーム	shūkurīmu	chou (à la) crème	a cream puff	French, English
シュプール	Shupūru	spoor	trail from/for skis	Dutch
シュプレヒコール	Shupurehikōru	Sprechchor	chant (e.g. during a demonstration)	German
シュラーフ / シュラーフザック	shurāfu / shurāfuzakku	Schlaf / Schlafsack	sleeping bag	German
ソファー	sofā	sofa	a sofa	English (from Arabic)
ソフト	sofuto	soft(ware)	video game console or computer software; also used to describe tasks or work (such as design) requiring imagination, foresight, and intuition	English
ソフトクリーム	sofuto kurīmu or softcream	soft (ice) cream	soft serve (ice cream)	English
ソーラーシステム	sōrā shisutemu	solar system	a solar battery	English
すべた or スベタ	subeta	espada ("spade")	unattractive woman	^{*}Portuguese / Spanish
スイートルーム	suīto rūmu	suite room	a suite in a hotel	English
スケボー	sukebō	ska(te)bo(ard)	skateboard	English
スケルトン	sukeruton	skeleton	translucent	English
スキー	sukī	ski	(noun) skiing	English
スキンシップ	sukinshippu	skin + -ship	skinship (bonding through physical contact)	English
スコップ	sukoppu	schop	trowel, spade, shovel	Dutch
スマート	sumāto	smart	slim, stylish, well-dressed, cool, handsome	English
スマホ	sumaho	sma(rt) + (p)ho(ne)	smartphone	English
スムーズ	sumūzu	smooth (transaction)	When a plan or transaction happens without incident	English
スーパー	sūpā	super(market)	supermarket	English
スパッツ, スパッツタイツ	supattsu, supattsu taitsu	spats, spats tights	tights (US), leggings	English
スペイン	Supein	Spain	Spain	English
スペル	superu	spell	(noun) spelling	English
スピン	supin	spin	a ribbon or tassel on a book	English
スポイト	supoito	spuit	syringe, dropper	Dutch
スリーサイズ	surī saizu	three size	three primary female body measurements (bust, waist, hips)	English
スター	sutā	star	star, Starr	English
スタイル	sutairu	style	body shape; style	English
ステップ	suteppu	step	step, steppe	English/German
ストライキ or スト	sutoraiki or suto	strike or st(rike)	labor strike	English
ストレートティー	sutorēto tī	straight tea	black tea without milk or lemon	English
ストーブ	sutōbu	stove	space heater	English
スーツアクター	sūtsu akutā	suits actor	suit actor, an actor who performs wearing a cartoon-character costume	English
タバコ, たばこ or 煙草	tabako	tabaco	tobacco, cigarette	^{*}Portuguese / Spanish
タイムオーバー	taimu ōbā	time over	when a time limit has been reached	English
タイムリー	taimurī	timely (hit)	a clutch hit (in baseball), on time	English
タンク	tanku	tank	tank	English
タオルケット	taoru ketto	towelket (towel + (blan)ket)	a type of blanket made of a material similar to a beach or bath towel	English
タレント	tarento	talento	TV personality/celebrity	Portuguese
テーブル	tēburu	table	table	English
テーマ	tēma	Thema	theme	German
テレビ	terebi	television	device used for watching	English
テンキー	tenkī	ten key	numeric keypad	English
てんぷら or 天ぷら	tenpura	tempero and têmpora	tempura. Conflation of Portuguese tempero ("seasoning") and têmpora ("ember days", a Catholic holiday).	Portuguese
テンション	tenshon	tension	a state of excitement	English
テレビ	terebi	televi(sion)	television	English
テレビゲーム	terebi gēmu	televi(sion) game	video game	English
テレフォン	terefon	telephone	telephone, phone	English
テレカ	tereka	tele(phone) ca(rd)	prepaid card for using public telephones	English
ティーンエージャー	tīn'ējā	teenager	teenager, teen	English
トーチカ	tōchika	точка (tochka, meaning '(longterm firing) point')	bunker, Pillbox (military)	Russian
トイレ	toire	toilet	toilet, bathroom, washroom, restroom	English
タン	tan	tongue	tongue	English
トマト	tomato	tomato	tomato	Nahuatl via UK English
トンカツ	tonkatsu	ton (豚, pork) + katsu (from the English cutlet)	pork cutlet	Japanese + English
トップページ	toppu-pēji	top + page	home page, start page	English
トラブル (noun), トラブる (verb)	toraburu	trouble	(noun) (legal) trouble, a dispute or altercation; (verb) to encounter or experience trouble, to break down or not function as expected (e.g., a device)	English
トラックメーカー	torakkumēkā	track maker	music producer	English
トランプ	toranpu	trump(s)	playing cards	English
トレーナー	torēnā	trainer	sweatshirt	English (UK)
トレーニングパンツ	torēningu pantsu	training pants	pants for toddlers or babies; diaper	English
ツイッター	tsuittā	Twitter	Twitter app	English
ウィンカー or ウインカー	winkā or uinkā	winker	turn signal, a.k.a. blinker or indicator on an automobile	English
ウーパールーパー	ūpārūpā	wooper looper	Wasei-eigo for axolotl	English
ヴァージンロード	vājin rōdo	virgin road	the aisle (in a Western-style or Christian wedding ceremony, as followed by the bridal procession)	English
ワイドショー	waido shō	wide show	talk show	English
ワイシャツ or Yシャツ	wai shatsu	Y (< "white") shirt	dress shirt (of any color)	English
ワンパターン	wan patān	one pattern	of (artificial or boring) uniformity or conformity, lacking of (spontaneous) variation. Used to describe behavior and responses as well as objects. Being "in a rut"	English
ワンピース	wan pīsu	one piece	(a single-piece) dress	English
ワープロ	wāpuro	wor(d) pro(cessor)	word processor	English
ウォシュレット	woshuretto	washlet (wash+(toi)let)	a toilet with a built-in bidet (a genericized trademark of Toto)	English
ヨット	yotto	yacht	a sailboat or yacht	English
ヤンエグ	yan egu	youn(g) ex(ecutive)	young executive	English
ヨード	yōdo	jood	iodine	Dutch
ヨードチンキ	yōdo chinki	joodtinctuur	tincture of iodine	Dutch
ユニットバス	yunitto basu	unit bath	modular bath, prefabricated bath	English
Uターンラッシュ	yūtān rasshu	U-turn rush	the rush of traffic and people, and attendant traffic jams and crowding of transportation facilities, that occurs as everyone returns home after extended holidays, esp. New Year's, Golden Week, and the summer o-bon week.	English
ザイル	zairu	Seil (meaning 'rope')	rope (used in a climbing context, in preference to the general term 'rōpu')	German
ゼミナール or ゼミ	zemināru or zemi	Seminar or Semi(nar)	seminar	German
ゼン or 禅	zen	ध्यान (dhyāna)	a meditation	Sanskrit via Chinese
ゼロ	zero	zéro	zero	French / Italian / Latin
ズボン	zubon	jupon (meaning "petticoat")	trousers (UK), pants (US)	French

== See also ==
- List of Japanese Latin alphabetic abbreviations
- List of English words of Japanese origin
- Engrish
- Japanese abbreviated and contracted words
- Glossary of Japanese words of Portuguese origin
- Glossary of Japanese words of Dutch origin
- Glossary of Japanese words of French origin
- Glossary of Japanese words of German origin
