= Synonym =

Words or phrases of the same meaning

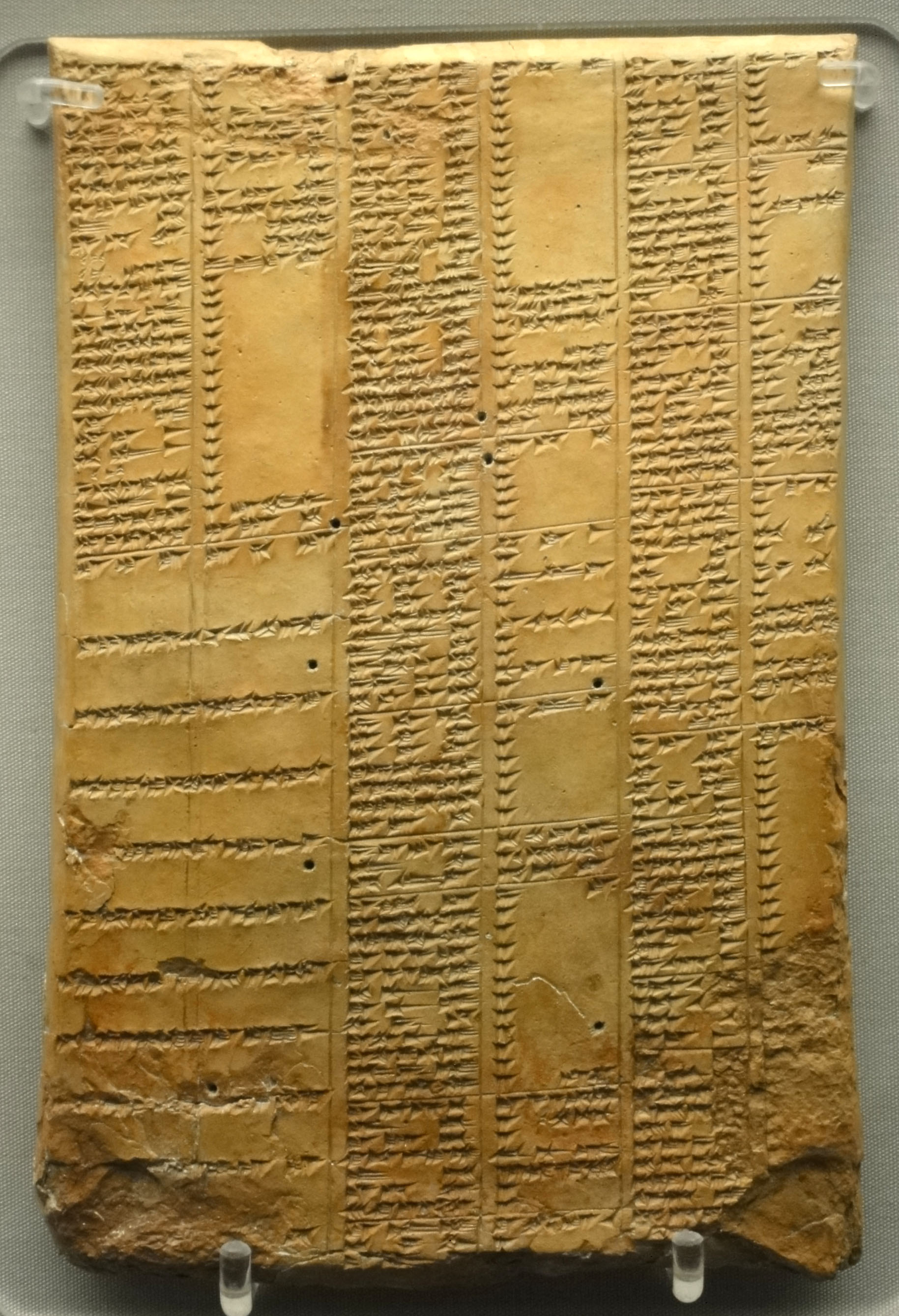
Synonym list in cuneiform on a clay tablet, Neo-Assyrian period

A synonym is a word, morpheme, or phrase that has a similar or identical meaning to another word, morpheme, or phrase in a given language. For example, in English, words like begin, start, commence, and initiate are synonyms: they are synonymous. The standard test for synonymy is substitution: one form can be used interchangeably without changing the meaning of the sentence.

Words may be synonymous in only one particular sense: for example, long and extended in the context of long time or extended time are synonymous, but long cannot be used in the phrase extended family.

Synonyms with identical meanings share a seme or denotational sememe, whereas those with inexactly similar meanings share a broader denotational or connotational sememe and overlap within a semantic field. The former are sometimes known as cognitive synonyms, and the latter are referred to as near-synonyms, plesionyms, or poecilonyms.

== Lexicography ==
Some lexicographers argue that no synonyms are analogous (in all contexts or social levels of language) due to differences in etymology, orthography, phonic qualities, connotations, ambiguous meanings, and usage. For example, feline is more formal than cat, and a long arm is not the same as an extended arm, as long and extended are not always interchangeable. Synonyms can also be used as euphemisms.

Metonymy is sometimes a type of synonymy. For example, White House is often used as a synonym of the administration to refer to the U.S. executive branch under a specific president. In this context, metonymy functions as a hyponym of synonymy.

The study of synonymy, polysemy, hyponymy, and hypernymy is essential in information science for taxonomy and ontology. This analysis is also important in pedagogy and machine learning for word-sense disambiguation.

== Etymology ==
The term synonym is derived from the Latin word synōnymum, which was borrowed from the Ancient Greek word synōnymon (συνώνυμον). It is composed of the Greek elements sýn (σύν, meaning 'together, similar, alike') and -ōnym- (-ωνυμ-), a form of onoma (ὄνομα, meaning 'name').

== Sources ==
Synonyms in a language can come from different linguistic strata. In English, superstratum words from Norman French and Old English coexist, creating words like people, liberty, archer (from Norman French) and folk, freedom, bowman (from Old English). For more examples, see the list of Germanic and Latinate equivalents in English.

Loanwords are frequently used as synonyms, often borrowed from the dominant culture's language in a region. European languages commonly borrow from Latin and ancient Greek for technical terms, while native terms are used in everyday language. In East Asia, languages like Japanese, Korean, and Vietnamese incorporate Chinese borrowings alongside native words. Arabic and Persian are significant sources of synonymous borrowings in Islamic cultures.

In Turkish, kara and siyah both mean 'black', with kara being a native Turkish word and siyah a borrowing from Persian. In Ottoman Turkish, water is often referred to as su (Turkish), âb (Persian), or mâ (Arabic), "such a triad of synonyms exists in Ottoman for every meaning, without exception". These synonyms in Ottoman Turkish offer nuances and variations in meaning or usage.

In English, Latin (L) and Greek (Gk) terms are often synonymous with Germanic ones. For example, thought and notion (L) are synonymous with idea (Gk), while ring and circle (L) are synonymous with cycle (Gk). English typically uses the Germanic term as a noun, but employs Latin and Greek adjectives. For instance, hand and manual (L) are synonymous with chiral (Gk), and heat and thermal (L) are synonymous with caloric (Gk). In some cases, the Germanic term has become rare or limited to specific meanings, such as tide, time/temporal, and chronic.

Many bound morphemes in English are borrowed from Latin and Greek, serving as synonyms for native words or morphemes. For example, fish corresponds to pisci- (L) and ichthy- (Gk).

Coinages are another source of synonyms, often motivated by linguistic purism. For example, the English word foreword was coined to replace the Romance term preface. In Turkish, the word okul was created to replace the Arabic-derived mektep and mederese, although the latter terms are still used in certain contexts.

== Uses ==
Synonyms often convey subtle differences in meaning or are employed in various speech or writing registers.

Different technical fields may use synonyms to express specific technical distinctions.

Elegant variation is the practice of using synonyms to avoid repetition of the same word in proximity by using synonyms. However, modern style guides often criticize this practice.

== Examples ==
Synonyms can be any part of speech, as long as both words are of the same part of speech. Examples:

- noun: drink and beverage
- verb: buy and purchase
- adjective: big and large
- adverb: quickly and speedily
- preposition: on and upon

Synonyms are defined according to certain senses of words. For example, pupil refers to the aperture in the eye, not a student. He expired is synonymous with he died, but my passport has expired cannot be replaced with my passport has died.

A thesaurus or synonym dictionary lists similar or related words; these are often, but not always, synonyms.

- The word poecilonym is a rare synonym of the word synonym. It is not entered in most major dictionaries and is a curiosity or piece of trivia for being an autological word due to its meta nature as a synonym of synonym.
- Antonyms are words with opposite or nearly opposite meanings. For example, hot ↔ cold, large ↔ small, thick ↔ thin, synonym ↔ antonym
- Hypernyms and hyponyms represent a broader category and a specific instance within that category. For instance, vehicle is a hypernym of car, while car is a hyponym of vehicle.
- Homophones are words that sound the same but have different meanings. For example, witch and which are homophones in most accents because they are pronounced in the same way.
- Homographs are words that are spelled the same but have different meanings. For example, record can refer to both the act of recording a song and keeping a record of documents.
- Homonyms are words that have the same pronunciation and spelling but different meanings. For example, rose can refer to a type of flower or the past tense of rise.

== See also ==
- -onym
- Cognitive synonymy
- Elegant variation, the gratuitous use of a synonym in prose
- Semantic equivalence (linguistics)
- Synonym (taxonomy)
- Synonymy in Japanese
- Synset, a set of synonyms in computational linguistics
- Thesauri and synonym dictionaries – Reference work for synonyms
