= Konglish =

Korean-style English

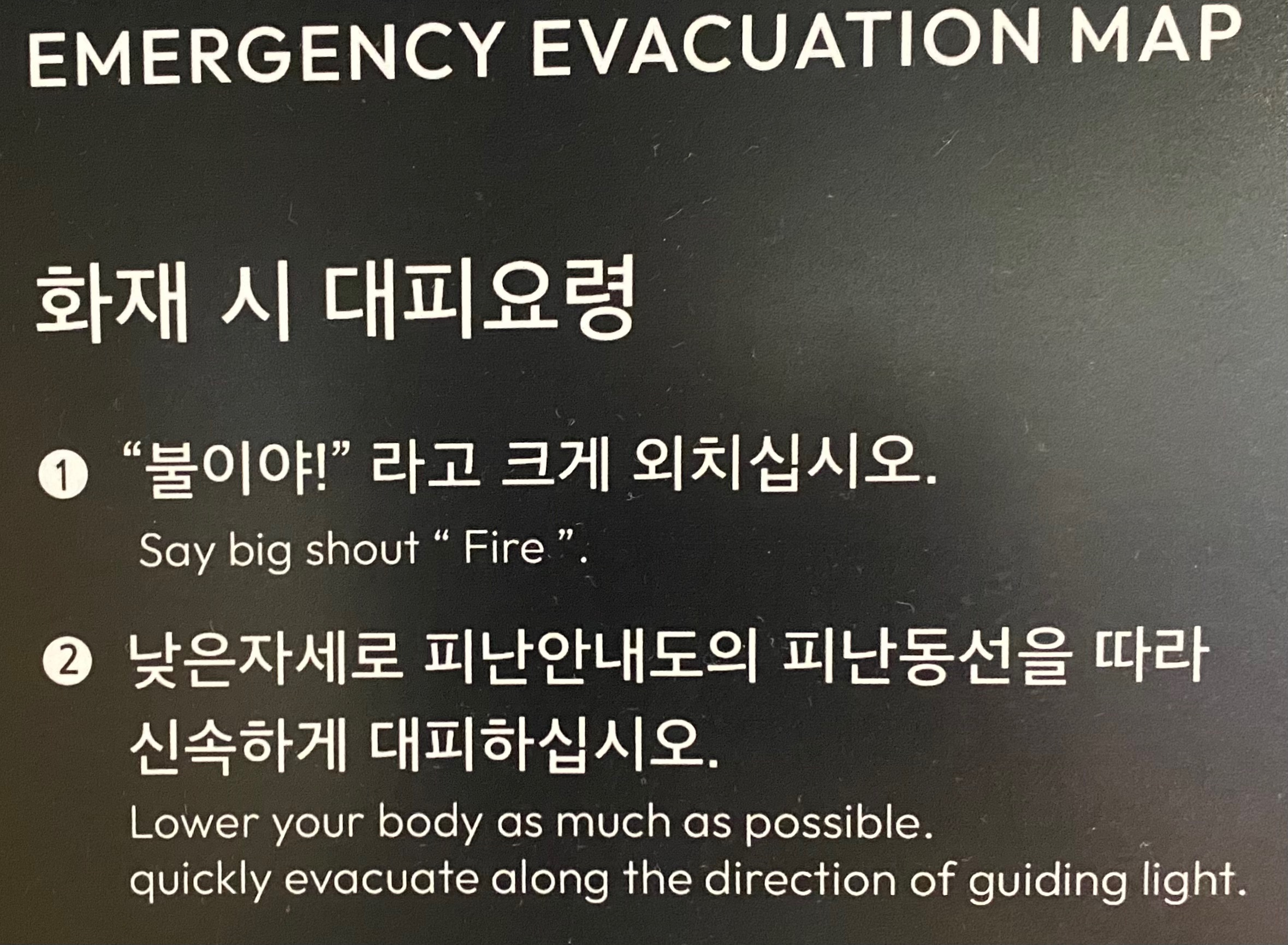
Korean-style English

Konglish (Korean: 콩글리시; RR: konggeullisi; [kʰoŋ.ɡɯl.li.ɕi]), more formally Korean-style English (Korean: 한국어식 영어; Hanja: 韓國語式英語; RR: hangugeo-sik yeongeo; [han.ɡu.ɡʌ.ɕik̚ jʌŋ.ʌ]), comprises English and other foreign-language loanwords that have been borrowed into Korean, and includes many that are used in ways that are not readily understandable to native English speakers. It's also code-mixing or code-switching of Korean and English. A common example is the Korean term "hand phone" for the English "mobile phone". Konglish also has direct English loanwords, mistranslations from English to Korean, or pseudo-English words coined in Japanese that came to Korean usage. Sociolinguistically, South Koreans use English to denote luxury, youth, sophistication, and modernity.

The term is a portmanteau of the names of the two languages and was first recorded in 1975. Other less common terms include: Korlish (recorded from 1988), Korenglish (1992), Korglish (2000) and Kinglish (2000). The use of Konglish is widespread in South Korea as a result of US cultural influence, but it is not familiar to North Koreans.

== Overview ==
A possible explanation behind South Korea's acceptance and rapid integration of English into the Korean language and culture may lie in the overall South Korean attitude towards globalization. English-learning has become prevalent in South Korean society, which Joseph Sung-Yul Park, in his 2009 paper, attributes to three primary developments and qualities - necessitation, externalization, and self-deprecation. Park believes necessitation stems from the general Korean belief that learning English is a must to succeed in the globalizing world, whereas externalization refers to treating English as the language of the so-called "other", opposite to the Korean identity. Finally, self-deprecation refers to Park's belief that Koreans think that they are viewed by the world to not be competent in their usage of English.

The English language has become so interpenetrated into the Korean language that English makes up over 90% of the loanwords in the Korean lexicon today, and there continue to be debates among Korean linguists over whether establishing the national language of South Korea as English would be a prudent decision in the globalizing world. In fact, Harkness attributes this development in South Korean society as a sign of South Korean ambivalence towards its engagement with the rest of the world to an extent.

On the contrary, however, North Korea has undergone a systematic purging of its language, eliminating its reliance on foreign influences. In fact, language is viewed not only as a useful tool to further its propaganda, but also as a 'weapon' to reinforce its ideology and the "building of socialism". Today, the North Korean language, which was officially established as "Munhwaŏ", or "cultured language", in 1966, consists of nativized Sino-Korean vocabulary and has eliminated foreign loan words from the North Korean lexicon. These steps first included its decolonization process in an attempt to re-establish a unique "North Korean" identity, eliminating the Japanese language and culture that had deeply penetrated the Korean peninsula during the decades of Japanese annexation. Additionally, it continued to resist adopting loan words from foreign sources, especially when it came to English - thus, there are barely, if any, "Konglish" terms in the North Korean language.

== History ==
Korea became a colony of Japan between 1910 and 1945. During the colonial period, Japanese was the main language through which English terms of communication were imported into Korea, especially at times when teaching and speaking Korean was prohibited. As Japan actively imported Western culture and technology in the years that followed, the earliest English loanwords evolved gradually through this Japanese influence. For example, one of the well-known words is 커피 which originates from the word "coffee". After the Second World War, U.S. culture and language had a deeper influence on Koreans with the arrival of the U.S. army. The popularity of the use of English in the Korean language also increased. According to data at the time, up to 10% of Korean vocabulary came from and was changed from English. Thus, Konglish was adopted with increasing usage during the years of U.S. presence in Korea.

== Category ==
Konglish is relatively understudied and also varies in definition across individuals. However, some experts would agree that its formation parallels that of pidgins and creoles but that it cannot be defined as those categories because it is not yet its own category of English, but it is rather a subcategory of Korean that is conceptualized in the form of English words and phrases, which have been integrated with Korean.

Konglish is ambiguous in its category of linguistics but is similar to the definition of Platt's "New Englishes", which is distinguished from erroneous or temporary forms of English. Konglish aligns with the standards of "New Englishes" by being developed through the education system in an area in which English is not the native language spoken by most of the population, used for a range of functions among the speakers, and has been localized by adopting some language feature of its own such as intonation patterns and expressions.

== Laterals ==
Many Koreans who immigrate to the United States and learn English have a distinct Korean-English variation, especially in early stages of acquisition. One reason this is so is due to distinct laterals between English and Korean languages, which affects the articulatory and acoustic characteristics of the languages. American English is often described as having "dark" variants, which involves a primary alveolar contact gesture as well as a secondary dorsal retraction gesture. In most cases, English in America is spoken with very little anterior contact in the mouth, and instead uses the narrowed upper pharyngeal area with a retracted tongue dorsum. The Korean lateral on the other hand is considered to be "light" in its acoustic and articulatory characteristics. The two gestures that make up the Korean lateral include tongue tip closure and palatalization, which involves the raising of the tongue body.

According to the Speech Learning Model, learning a second language is easier in later stages of acquisition for laterals that are more different than similar because one can recognize the differences in speech sounds more clearly. This is true for Koreans learning English, as they use distinct articulatory tongue shapes, using a low tongue body and a heavily retracted tongue dorsum for their English word-final lateral, similar to native English speakers.

In loanwords used in Konglish, the dark English lateral is often mapped onto the loanwords Koreans use, showing that Koreans see these loanwords as separate from purely Korean, even though it is used in everyday life.

== Examples ==
These two lists of Konglish terms, the second being loan words that arrived via Japanese influence, are intended to contain Konglish terms not readily understandable to a native English speaker, similar to wasei-eigo terms in the Japanese language. Many Konglish terms were invented by Koreans through non-standard abbreviations or combinations of English words or by applying a new meaning or usage to a common English word.

While English words may have reached Korea via globalization, modernization, etc., social and linguistic factors had an impact in the shift of meaning of the words introduced as they were propagated through the community. An example of a Korean false friend is the word "미팅", which sounds like "meeting" in English but means "blind date".

A trend in the naming of apartment buildings in Seoul is blending English words together because developers believe this will enhance the luxury brand image of the properties. Some examples of apartment names with blended English words include: Luxtige, Blesstige, Tristige and Forestige, XI; these words are combinations of luxury, bless, prestige, trinity, forest, extra and intelligence.

- aggro - "action of asking to be attacked, large-scale trolling"
  eogeuro (어그로 [ʌ.ɡɯ.ɾo]) < aggravation
- carry - "to single-handedly carry the failing project to a success"
  kaeri (캐리 [kʰɛ.ɾi]) < carry
- di-ca – "digital camera"
  dika (디카 [ti.kʰa]) < digital camera
- Dutch pay – "going Dutch"
  deochi pei (더치 페이 [tʌ.tɕʰi pʰe.i]) < Dutch + pay
- eye shopping - "window shopping"
  ai syoping (아이 쇼핑 [a.i ɕjo.pʰiŋ]) < eye + shopping
- hand phone – "mobile phone"
  haendeupon (핸드폰 [hɛn.dɯ.pon]) < hand + phone
- hunting – "searching for a date"
  heonting (헌팅 [hʌn.tʰiŋ]) < hunting
- newtro – "new reinterpretation of retro trends"
  nyuteuro (뉴트로 [nju.tʰɯ.ɾo]) < new + retro
- meeting – "group blind date"
  miting (미팅 [mi.tʰiŋ]) < meeting
- officetel – "an apartment that can also be used as an office"
  opiseutel (오피스텔 [o.pʰi.sɯ.tʰel]) < office + hotel
- one plus one – "buy one, get one free"
  won peulleoseu won (원 플러스 원 [wʌn pʰɯl.lʌ.sɯ wʌn]) < one + plus + one
- one shot – "bottoms up"
  wonsyat (원샷 [wʌn.ɕjat̚]) < one + shot
- overeat – "vomiting"
  obaiteu (오바이트 [o.ba.i.tʰɯ]) < overeat
- padding – "padded down jacket/coat"
  paeding (패딩 [pʰɛ.diŋ]) < padding
- panty stocking – "pantyhose"
  paenti staking (팬티 스타킹 [pʰɛn.tʰi sɯ.tʰa.kʰiŋ]) < panty + stocking
- poclain – "excavator"
  pokeurein (포크레인 [pʰo.kʰɯ.ɾe.in]) < Poclain
- pocket ball – "pool, pocket billiards"
  poketbol (포켓볼 [pʰo.kʰet̚.p͈ol]) < pocket + ball
- pop song – "English-language popular music"
  papsong (팝송 [pʰap̚.s͈oŋ]) < pop + song
- random box - "loot box"
  raendeombakseu (랜덤박스 [nɛndʌmbaks͈ɯ]) < random + box
- ribbon – "bow"
  ribon (리본 [ɾi.bon]) < ribbon
- skin-scuba – "skin diving and scuba diving"
  seukinseukubeo (스킨스쿠버 [sɯ.kʰin.sɯ.kʰu.bʌ]) < skin + scuba
- villa – "small-sized condominium (multi-household house with 4 floors or less)"
  billa (빌라 [pil.la]) < villa
- webtoon – "webcomic"
  weptun (웹툰 [wep̚.tʰun]) < web + cartoon
  Created by the confusion between ‘comic’ and ‘cartoon’.
- service – "free/on the house"
  seobiseu (서비스 [sʌbisɯ]) < service

=== Loanwords from Japan ===
Many loanwords entered into Korean from Japan, especially during the Japanese forced occupation, when the teaching and speaking of Korean was prohibited. Those Konglish words are loanwords from, and thus similar to, Wasei-eigo used in Japan.

A simple example would be how the meaning of the English word "cunning" changes when used in a Konglish sentence. In South Korea, keonning means cheating, as the loanword was adapted from Japanglish kanningu (カンニング), which means "cheating". Konglish words may or may not have a similar meaning to the original word when used, and a well-known brand name can become a generalized trademark and replace the general word: older Korean people tend to use the word babari ("Burberry") or babari-koteu ("Burberry coat"), which came from Japanese bābari-kōto (meaning "gabardine raincoat") to refer to all trench coats. Coats made by Burberry are called beobeori-koteu (버버리 코트), rather than babari-koteu in Korean (as the brand name, entered to Korean language directly from English, is Beobeori). Some examples such as "Burberry" and "fighting" can be considered pseudo-anglicisms as they follow certain traits: use native words in conjunction with an English suffix like -ting or -ism to create a word that does not exist in the English language. The word "fighting" (화이팅) is an instance of this. Words like "Burberry" (바바리) are invented through other means due to social or cultural elements. The use of "Burberry" (바바리) over trench coats can be compared to Kleenex’s usage over tissue.

Compared to Japanese, both English and Korean have more vowels and permit more coda consonants. Oftentimes when Japanized English words enter into the Korean language, the "original" English words from which the Japanglish words were derived are reverse-traced, and the words undergo de-Japanization (sometimes with hypercorrection).

- ad-balloon – "aerial advertising balloon"
  aedeubeollun (애드벌룬 [ɛ.dɯ.bʌl.lun]) < ado-barūn (アドバルーン [adobaɾɯꜜːɴ]) < ad + balloon
- after service, A/S – "customer service", "warranty"
  apeuteo seobiseu (애프터 서비스 [ɛ.pɯ.tʰʌ sʌ.bi.sɯ]) < afutāsābisu (アフターサービス [aɸɯ̥taːsaꜜːbisɯ]) < after + service
- air-con - "air conditioner"
  eeokeon (에어컨) [e.ʌ.kʰʌn]) < eakon (エアコン [e̞a̠kõ̞ɴ]) < air + conditioner
- apart – "apartment building"
  apateu (아파트 [a.pʰa.tʰɯ]) < apāto (アパート [apaꜜːto]) < apartment
- auto-bi – "motorcycle"
  otobai (오토바이 [o.tʰo.ba.i]) < ōtobai (オートバイ [oːtoꜜbai]) < auto + bicycle
- back mirror – "rear-view mirror"
  baengmireo (백미러 [pɛŋ.mi.ɾʌ]) < bakkumirā (バックミラー [bakkɯmiꜜɾaː]) < back + mirror
- ball pen – "ballpoint pen"
  bolpen (볼펜 [pol.pʰen]) < bōrupen (ボールペン [boꜜːɾɯpeɴ]) < ball + pen
- bond – "glue, adhesive"
  bondeu (본드 [pon.dɯ]) < bondo (ボンド [boꜜndo]) < bond
- Burberry coat – "trench coat"
  babari koteu (바바리 코트 [pa.ba.ɾi kʰo.tʰɯ]) < bābarikōto (バーバリコート [baːbaɾikoꜜːto], "gabardine raincoat") < Burberry coat
- career woman – "a woman who works"
  keorieo umeon (커리어 우먼 [kʰʌ.ɾi.ʌ u.mʌn]) < kyaria-ūman (キャリアウーマン [kʲaɾiaɯꜜːmaɴ]) < career + woman
- carrier – "suit case"
  kaerieo (캐리어 [kʰɛ.ɾi.ʌ]) < kyarībaggu (キャリーバッグ [kʲaɾiːbaꜜɡɡɯ]) < carrier + bag
- cider – "lemon-lime drink"
  saida (사이다 [sa.i.da]) < saidā (サイダー [saꜜidaː]) < cider
- circle – "student's club"
  seokeul (서클 [sʌ.kʰɯl]) < sākuru (サークル [saːkɯɾɯ]) < circle
- complex – "insecurity, sense of inferiority"
  kompeullekseu (콤플렉스 [kʰom.pʰɯl.lek.s͈ɯ]) < conpurekkusu (コンプレックス [kompɯɾeꜜkkɯ̥sɯ]) < complex
- concent – "power sockets, outlets"
  konsenteu (콘센트 [kʰon.sen.tʰɯl]) < konsento (コンセント [koꜜɰ̃sento]) < concentric plug
- cunning – "cheating"
  keoning (커닝 [kʰʌ.niŋ]) or keonning (컨닝 [kʰʌn.niŋ]) < kanningu (カンニング [kaɲɲiŋɡɯ]) < cunning
- ero – "lewd"
  ero (에로 [e.ɾo]) < ero (エロ [eɾo]) < erotic
- dash – "asking someone out, approaching, taking the initiative (in dating)"
  daesi (대시 [tɛ.ɕi]) < dasshu (ダッシュ [daꜜɕɕɯ], "dashing, rushing") < dash
- fancy – "stationery"
  paensi (팬시 [pʰɛn.ɕi]) < fanshī-shōhin (ファンシー商品 [ɸaɰ̃ɕiːɕoꜜːhiɴ]; "illustrated goods") < fancy + Japanese "goods"
- fighting – "Go go go!", "Good luck!", "You can do it!"
  paiting (파이팅 [pʰa.i.tiŋ]) or hwaiting (화이팅 [hwa.i.tiŋ]) < faito (ファイト [ɸaito]) < fight
- gag man – "comedian"
  gaegeuman (개그맨 [kɛ.ɡɯ.mɛn]) < gyaguman (ギャグマン [ɡʲaɡɯmaɴ]) < gag + man
- gag woman – "comedienne"
  gaegeuwoman (개그우먼 [kɛ.ɡɯ.u.mʌn]) < gyaguūman (ギャグウーマン [ɡʲaɡɯ.ɯꜜːmaɴ]) < gag + woman
- glamour – "a buxom woman"
  geullaemeo (글래머 [kɯl.lɛ.mʌ]) < guramāgāru (グラマーガール [ɡɯɾamaːɡaꜜːɾɯ]) < glamour + girl
- handle – "steering wheel"
  haendeul (핸들 [hɛn.dɯl]) < handoru (ハンドル [handoɾɯ]) < handle
- health club – "gym"
  helseu keulleop (헬스 클럽 [hel.s͈ɯ kʰɯl.lʌp̚]) < herusukurabu (ヘルスクラブ [heɾɯsɯ̥kɯꜜɾabɯ]) < health + club
- hotchkiss – "stapler"
  hochikiseu (호치키스 [ho.tɕʰi.kʰi.sɯ]) < hochikisu (ホチキス [hoꜜtɕi̥kisɯ]) < American brand name E. H. Hotchkiss Company
- key holder – "keychain"
  ki holdeo (키 홀더 [kʰi hol.dʌ]) < kīhorudā (キーホルダー [kiːhoꜜɾɯdaː]) < key + holder
- kick board – "kick scooter"
  kikbodeu (킥보드 [kʰik̚.p͈o.dɯ]) < kikkubōdo (キックボード [kikkɯboꜜːdo]) < kick + board
- knit – "knitted sweater"
  niteu (니트 [ni.tʰɯ]) < nitto (ニット [ɲiꜜtto]) < knit
- machine – "sewing machine"
  mising (미싱 [mi.ɕiŋ]) < mishin (ミシン [miꜜɕiɴ]) < machine
- manicure – "nail polish"
  maenikyueo (매니큐어 [mɛ.ni.kʰju.ʌ]) < manikyua (マニキュア [maɲikʲɯa]) < manicure
- mass-com – "mass media"
  maeseukeom (매스컴 [mɛ.sɯ.kʌm]) < masukomi (マスコミ [masɯ̥komi]) < mass + communication
- morning call – "wakeup call"
  moningkol (모닝콜 [mo.niŋ.kʰol]) < mōningukōru (モーニングコール [moːniŋɡɯkoꜜːɾɯ]) < morning + call
- one-piece – "dress"
  wonpiseu (원피스 [wʌn.pʰi.sɯ]) < wanpīsu (ワンピース [wampiꜜːsɯ]) < one + piece
- one-room – "studio apartment"
  wollum (원룸 [wʌl.lum]) < wanrūmumanshon (ワンルームマンション [wanɾɯːmɯmaꜜɰ̃ɕoɴ]) < one + room + mansion
- open car – "convertible"
  opeunka (오픈카 [o.pʰɯn.kʰal]) < ōpunkā (オープンカー [oːpɯŋkaː]) < open + car
- over – "overdo, exaggerate, be overdramatic"
  obeo (오버 [o.bʌ]) < ōbā (オーバー [oꜜːbaː]) < over
- remo-con – "remote control"
  rimokeon (리모컨 [ɾi.mo.kʌn]) < rimokon (リモコン [ɾimokoɴ]) < remote + control
- report – "term paper"
  ripoteu (리포트 [ɾi.pʰo.tʰɯ]) < repōto (レポート [ɾepoːto]) < report
- rinse – "hair conditioner"
  rinseu (린스 [ɾin.s͈ɯ]) < rinsu (リンス [ɾiꜜɰ̃sɯ]) < cream rinse
- running machine – "treadmill"
  reoning meosin (러닝 머신 [ɾʌ.niŋ mʌ.ɕin]) < ranningumashīn (ランニングマシーン [ɾaɲɲiŋɡɯmaɕiꜜːɴ]) < running + machine
- sel-ca – "selfie"
  selka (셀카 [sel.kʰa]) < seruka (セルカ [seꜜrɯka]) < self + camera
- self – "self-service"
  selpeu (셀프 [sel.pʰɯ]) < serufu (セルフ [seꜜrɯɸɯ])< self
- sense – "tact, wit"
  senseu (센스 [sen.s͈ɯ]) < sensu (センス [seꜜɰ̃sɯ])< sense
- service – "something that is free of charge"
  seobiseu (서비스 [sʌ.bi.sɯ]) < sābisu (サービス [saꜜːbisɯ]) < service
- sharp – "mechanical pencil"
  syapeu (샤프 [ɕja.pʰɯ]) < shāpupenshiru (シャープペンシル [ɕaːpɯpeꜜɰ̃ɕiɾɯ]) < sharp + pencil
- sign – "autograph"
  sain (사인 [sa.in]) < sain (サイン [saꜜiɴ]) < sign
- sign pen – "marker pen"
  sainpen (사인펜 [sa.in.pʰen]) < sainpen (サインペン [saiꜜmpeɴ]) < sign + pen
- skinship – "physical contact"
  seukinsip (스킨십 [sɯ.kʰin.ɕip̚]) < sukinshippu (スキンシップ [sɯ̥kiɰ̃ɕiꜜppɯ]) < skin + -ship
- SNS – "social media"
  eseu-en-eseu (에스엔에스 [e.sɯ.en.e.sɯ]) < esu-enu-esu (エスエヌエス [esɯenɯesɯ]) < social + networking + service
- soul food – "comfort food"
  soul pudeu (소울 푸드 [so.ul.pʰu.dɯ]) < sōrufūdo (ソウルフード [soːɾɯɸɯꜜːdo]) < soul + food
- stand – "desk lamp"
  seutaendeu (스탠드 [sɯ.tʰɛn.dɯ]) < sutando (スタンド [sɯ̥tando]) < stand
- super – "corner shop"
  syupeo (슈퍼 [ɕju.pʰʌ]) < sūpā (スーパー [sɯꜜːpaː]) < supermarket
- talent – "televised drama actor"
  taelleonteu (탤런트 [tʰɛl.lʌn.tʰɯ]) < tarento (タレント [taɾento]) < talent
- tape cleaner – "lint remover"
  teipeu keullineo (테이프 클리너 [tʰe.i.pʰɯ kʰɯl.li.nʌ]) < tēpu-kurīnā (テープクリーナー [teːpɯ̥kɯɾiꜜːnaː]) < tape + cleaner
- trump card – "playing cards"
  teureompeu kadeu (트럼프 카드 [tʰɯ.ɾʌm.pʰɯ kʰa.dɯ]) < toranpu kādo (トランプ・カード [toɾampɯ kaꜜːdo]) < trump + card
- two piece – "skirt or pants and a top"
  tupiseu (투피스 [tʰu.pʰi.sɯ]) < tsūpīsu (ツーピース [tsɯːpiꜜːsɯ]) < two + piece
- vinyl house – "polytunnel, hoop greenhouse"
  binil hauseu (비닐 하우스 [pi.nil ha.u.sɯ]) < binīruhausu (ビニールハウス [biniːɾɯhaꜜɯsɯ]) < vinyl + house
- white – "correction fluid, correction tape"
  hwaiteu (화이트 [hwa.i.tʰɯ]) < howaito (ホワイト [howaito]) < white
- Y-shirt – "dress shirt"
  waisheocheu (와이셔츠 [wa.i.ɕjʌ.tɕʰɯ]) < waishatsu (ワイシャツ [waiɕatsɯ]) < white shirt

=== Pseudo-Konglish loanwords ===
Some foreign-origin words such as areubaiteu (아르바이트, [a.ɾɯ.ba.i.tʰɯ], 'part-time'), a loanword from German Arbeit ([ˈar.baɪ̯t], 'work'), are sometimes mistakenly considered as Konglish and are corrected into "accurate" English loanword forms such as pateutaim (파트타임, [pʰa.tʰɯ.tʰa.im]).

== Debate ==
There is some debate around whether Konglish is harmful or helpful. Some argue that Konglish has limited benefit to South Korea's international competitiveness, and potentially negatively impacts the Korean language. In contrast, Jasper Kim, a law professor at Ewha Womans University, wrote that Konglish is necessary in a global context and that strict adherence to grammatical rules should not trump getting the message across.

Some argue Konglish can lead to misunderstandings. Native English speakers can be confused by Konglish terms that are used differently from their English analogues. This can have an impact on tourism. When Incheon Airport was first opened, more than 49 English-language signs were found to contain errors.

Some also argue that Konglish exacerbates linguistic divides in Korea. For example, North–South differences in the Korean language. Konglish exclusive to South Korea can be difficult to understand for North Korean defectors integrating into South Korean society. There is also the possibility of rural–urban differences in the usage of Konglish.

Konglish is sometimes taught in schools, which some consider a problem, possibly exacerbated by underqualified teachers.

== See also ==
- Contemporary culture of South Korea
- Engrish
- Pseudo-anglicism
- Wasei-eigo
