= List of Japanese words of Portuguese origin =

Many Japanese words of Portuguese origin entered the Japanese language when Portuguese Jesuit priests and traders introduced Christian ideas, Western science, medicine, technology and new products to the Japanese during the Muromachi period (15th and 16th centuries).

The Portuguese were the first Europeans to reach Japan and the first to establish direct trade between Japan and Europe, in 1543. During the 16th and 17th century, Portuguese Jesuits had undertaken a great work of Catechism, that ended only with religious persecution in the early Edo period (Tokugawa Shogunate).

== List of direct loanwords ==
Many of the words which were introduced and entered the Japanese language from Portuguese and Dutch are written in kanji or hiragana, rather than katakana, which is the more common way to write loanwords in Japanese in modern times. Kanji versions of the words are ateji, characters that are "fitted" or "applied" to the words by the Japanese, based on either the pronunciation or the meaning of the word.

The † indicates the word is archaic and no longer in use.

Japanese Rōmaji	Japanese script	Japanese meaning	Pre-modern Portuguese	Modern Portuguese	English translation of Portuguese	Notes
† anjo	アンジョ	angel	anjo	anjo	angel	Replaced in modern usage by 天使 (tenshi, literally "heavens" + "envoy").
† bateren	伴天連 / 破天連	a missionary priest (mainly from Jesuit)	padre	padre	priest	Used in early Christianity. For the sense of "Christian missionary", the modern term is 宣教師 (senkyōshi).
battera	ばってら / ja:バッテラ	kind of sushi	bateira	bateira, barco	boat	named after its shape
beranda	ベランダ	balcony	varanda	varanda	balcony	
bīdama	ja:ビー玉	marbles (spheric-shaped)	----	berlindes, bola-de-gude, bolinha-de-gude	marbles	abbrev. of bīdoro (Japanese: 'glass', also from Portuguese: see below) + tama (Japanese: 'ball').
bīdoro	ビードロ	1.(obsolete) glass.; 2. a traditional sound-making toy made of glass, also called popin.	vidro	vidro	glass	
bōbura	ボーブラ	(dialect) kabocha	abóbora	abóbora	pumpkin	originally was in use nationwide, but replaced by kabocha in Edo (Tokyo).
birōdo	ビロード / 天鵞絨	velvet	veludo	veludo	velvet	berubetto (from English velvet) is also used today.
bisuketto	ビスケット	biscuit	biscuito	biscuito	biscuit	biscuit (from English biscuit) is also used today.
bōro	ja:ボーロ / ぼうろ	a kind of small biscuit or cookie	bolo	bolo	cake	
botan	ボタン / 釦 / 鈕	button	botão	botão	button	
charumera	ja:チャルメラ	small double-reed wind instrument	charamela	charamela (caramelo, "caramel", is cognate)	shawm (cf. the cognate chalumeau)	formerly played in Japan by ramen vendors
chokki	チョッキ	waistcoat (UK); vest (U.S.); Jacket	jaque	colete, jaqueta	waistcoat (UK); vest (U.S.); Jacket	Besuto (from English vest) is common today.
† Deusu	デウス	Christian God	Deus	Deus	God	Replaced in modern usage by the terms 天帝 (tentei, literally "heavens" + "emperor, king") or 天主 (tenshu, literally "heavens" + "lord, master").
† dochirina	ドチリナ	doctrine	doutrina	doutrina	doctrine	Replaced in modern usage by the terms 教理 (kyōri, literally "teaching" + "reasoning") or 教義 (kyōgi, literally "teaching" + "right conduct; righteousness; justice; morality").
furasuko	ja:フラスコ	laboratory flask	frasco	frasco	flask	
hiryōzu, hiryūzu, hiryūsu	ja:飛竜頭	1.(obsolete) Deep-fried glutinous rice balls; 2.Fried tofu balls with mixed vegetables, also known as ganmodoki	filhós	filhós		
igirisu	イギリス / 英吉利	the United Kingdom	inglez	inglês	English (adj); Englishman	
† inheruno	インヘルノ	Christian hell	inferno	inferno	hell	Replaced in modern usage by the term 地獄 (jigoku, originally the term for Buddhist hells, still used in that sense as well).
† iruman	イルマン / 入満 / 伊留満 / 由婁漫	missionary next in line to become a priest	irmão	irmão	brother	Used in early Christianity. Replaced in modern usage by the term 助修士 (joshūshi, literally "assist" + "training" + "male person").
jōro	ja:じょうろ / 如雨露	watering can	jarro	jarro	jug, watering can	"possibly from Portuguese" (Kōjien dictionary)
juban/jiban	じゅばん / ja:襦袢	undervest for kimono	gibão	–	undervest	The French form jupon led to zubon (trousers).
kabocha	ja:カボチャ / 南瓜	1. kabocha. (ja:栗かぼちゃ); 2. any squash (plant).; 3. (obsolete) Cambodia.	Camboja (abóbora)	(abóbora) cabotiá	Cambodia (-n pumpkin)	Was thought to be from Cambodia, imported by the Portuguese.
kanakin/kanekin	金巾 / かなきん / かねきん	shirting, percale	canequim		unbleached muslin/calico	jargon from the textile business
† kandeya	カンデヤ	oil lamp	candeia, candela	vela, candeia	candle	Extinct. Kantera from Dutch kandelaar was also used. Replaced in modern usage by the terms 灯火 (tōka, literally "lamp" + "fire, flame") or ランプ (ranpu, from Dutch lamp).
† kapitan	甲比丹 / 甲必丹	captain (of ships from Europe in The Age of Discovery)	capitão	capitão	captain	Extinct. Replaced in modern usage by the terms 船長 (senchō, literally "ship" + "leader") or the English borrowing キャプテン (kyaputen).
kappa	ja:合羽	raincoat	capa	capa (de chuva)	raincoat, coat	reinkōto (from English raincoat) is prevalent nowadays.
karuta	ja:かるた / 歌留多	karuta cards, a traditional type of playing cards which is largely different from the modern worldwide ones	cartas (de jogar)	cartas (de jogar)	(playing) cards	
karusan	カルサン	a specific kind of hakama trousers	calção	pt:calção	shorts (as used in modern Portuguese), breeches (as used in the Portuguese of the 1600s)	
kasutera, kasutēra, kasuteira	ja:カステラ	Kind of sponge cake	(Pão de) Castela	(Pão de) Castela	(Bread/cake of) Castile	Theories cite Portuguese castelo (castle) or the region of Castile (Castela in Portuguese). The cake itself may originally derive from bizcocho, a Spanish kind of biscotti.
† kirishitan	ja:キリシタン / 切支丹 / 吉利支丹 (Also written in the more negative forms 鬼理死丹 and 切死丹 after Christianity was banned by the Tokugawa shogunate)	Christian people in 16th and 17th centuries (who were severely persecuted by the Shogunate)	christão	cristão	Christian	Replaced in modern usage by the terms キリスト教徒 (Kirisuto kyōto, literally "Christ" + "teaching" + "student") or the English borrowing クリスチャン (Kurisuchan).
kirisuto	キリスト / 基督	Christ	Christo	Cristo	Christ	
koendoro	コエンドロ	coriander	coentro	coentro	coriander	
konpeitō	金米糖 / ja:金平糖 / 金餅糖	Kind of star-shaped candy	confeito	confeito	confection, candies	(related to confetti)
koppu	コップ	cup	copo	copo	cup	
† kurusu	クルス	Christian cross	cruz	cruz	cross	Used in early Christianity. Replaced in modern usage by the term 十字架 (jūjika, literally "number ten" + "character" + "stand up, prop up").
manto	ja:マント	cloak	manto	manto	cloak	
marumero	ja:マルメロ	quince	marmelo	marmelo	quince	
meriyasu	ja:メリヤス / 莫大小	a kind of knit textile	medias	meias	hosiery, knitting	
mīra	ミイラ / 木乃伊	mummy	mirra	mirra	myrrh	Originally, mummies embalmed using myrrh.
†nataru	ナタル	Christmas	Natal	Natal	Christmas	Annual festival celebrating the birth of Jesus Christ. Replaced in modern usage by the English borrowing クリスマス (Kurisumasu).
oranda	オランダ / 和蘭(陀) / 阿蘭陀	The Netherlands, Holland	Hollanda	Holanda, Países Baixos	The Netherlands, Holland	
orugan	ja:オルガン	organ (music)	orgão	órgão	organ	
pan	ja:パン	bread	pão	pão	bread	Often wrongly connected to the Spanish pan or the French pain, both with the same meaning and the same Latinate origin. The word was introduced into Japan by Portuguese missionaries.
† paraiso	パライソ	paradise. Specifically in reference to the Christian ideal of heavenly paradise.	paraíso	paraíso	paradise	Replaced in modern usage by the terms 天国 (tengoku, literally "heavens" + "country") or the English borrowing パラダイス (paradaisu).
pin kara kiri made	ピンからキリまで	running the whole gamut, jumble of wheat and tares	(pinta, cruz)	(pinta, cruz)	(dot, cross)	literally 'from pin to kiri'
rasha	ja:ラシャ / 羅紗	a kind of wool woven textile	raxa	– (feltro)	felt	
rozario	ロザリオ	rosary	rosario	rosário	rosary	
† sabato	サバト	Saturday	sábado	sábado	Saturday	Replaced in modern usage by the term 土曜日 (Doyōbi, literally "earth" + "day of the week").
saboten	ja:サボテン / 仙人掌	cactus	sabão	sabão	soap	Indirect derivation, involving a pronunciation shift from earlier 石鹸手 read as sabonte, literally "soap" + "hand; method, means". /sabonte/ → /saboten/ The derivation is said to come from the soap-like feature of its juice, although there are controversies. See also shabon below.
Santa Maria	サンタマリア	Saint Mary	Santa Maria	Santa Maria	Saint Mary	Saint Mary
sarasa	ja:更紗	chintz	saraça		chintz	
shabon	シャボン	soap	sabão	sabão	soap	More likely from older Spanish xabon. Usually seen in compounds such as shabon-dama ('soap bubbles') in modern Japanese.
shurasuko	ja:シュラスコ	Brazilian style churrasco barbecue		churrasco	barbecue	Modern borrowing.
subeta	スベタ	(an insulting word for women)	espada	espada	sword	Originally a term from playing cards, in reference to certain cards that earned the player zero points. This meaning extended to refer to "a boring, shabby, low person", and from there to mean "an unattractive woman".
tabako	タバコ / 煙草 / たばこ	tobacco, cigarette	tobaco	tabaco	tobacco, cigarette	
totan	ja:トタン	1. zinc (obsolete); 2. zinc-galvanized sheet iron (e.g. corrugated galvanised iron for roofing)	tutanaga (Could be of other origin, as Nippo Jisho implies.)		tutenag (a zinc alloy; zinc)	The homophone "塗炭" is sometimes mistaken as an ateji for "トタン", but is actually a different word of native origin meaning "agony".
tempura	ja:天ぷら / 天麩羅 / 天婦羅	deep-fried seafood/vegetables	tempero, temperar; tempora	tempero, temperar; tempora	seasoning, to season; times of abstinence from meat	
zabon	ja:ざぼん / 朱欒 / 香欒	pomelo	zamboa	zamboa	pomelo	
† zesu or zezusu	ゼス, ゼズス	Jesus	Jesu	Jesus	Jesus	Replaced in modern usage by the term イエス (Iesu), a reconstruction of the Ancient Greek term.

== List of indirect loanwords ==
Japanese Rōmaji	Japanese script	Japanese meaning	Pre-modern Portuguese	Modern Portuguese	English translation of Portuguese	Notes
beranda	ベランダ	balcony	varanda	pt:varanda	balcony	Loanword from English "veranda", which derived from India, which in turn probably originated from Portuguese: varanda.

== False cognates ==
Some word pairs that appear similar are actually false cognates of unrelated origins.

=== Arigatō ===
It is often suggested that the Japanese word arigatō derives from the Portuguese obrigado, both of which mean "Thank you", but evidence indicates arigatō has a purely Japanese origin, so these two words are false cognates.

Arigatō is an "u"-sound change of arigataku. In turn, arigataku is the adverbial form of an adjective arigatai, from older arigatashi, itself a compound of ari + katashi. Written records of arigatashi exist dating back to the Man'yōshū compiled in the 8th century AD, well before Japanese contact with the Portuguese in the 16th century.

Ari is a conjugation of verb aru meaning "to be", and katashi is an adjective meaning "difficult", so arigatashi literally means "difficult to exist", hence "rare" and thus "precious", with usage shifting to indicate gratitude for receiving an outstanding kindness. The phrase to express such gratitude is arigatō gozaimasu, or arigatō for short.

=== Other words not of Portuguese origin ===
Japanese Rōmaji	Japanese script	English translation of Japanese	Supposedly similar Portuguese word	English translation of Portuguese	Notes
buranko	wikt:ぶらんこ	swing, swingset	balanço	swing	Not from Portuguese
gan	wikt:雁	wild goose	ganso	goose	Not from Portuguese
inoru (transcribed by Fonseca as inoriru, erroneously.)	wikt:祈る	pray	orar	pray	Not from Portuguese
miru	wikt:見る	see	mirar	look	Not from Portuguese

== See also ==
- Gairaigo
  - List of gairaigo and wasei-eigo terms
- Japanese words of Dutch origin
- Nippo Jisho, the first Japanese dictionary in a Western language
