= Wasei-eigo =

Pseudo-loanwords in Japanese

Wasei-eigo (和製英語; lit. 'Japanese-made English') are Japanese-language expressions that are based on English words, or on parts of English phrases, but do not exist in standard English, or do not have the meanings that they have in standard English. In linguistics, they are classified as pseudo-loanwords or pseudo-anglicisms.

== Definition and examples ==
Wasei-eigo words, compound words and portmanteaus are constructed by Japanese speakers on the basis of loanwords derived from English and embedded into the Japanese lexicon with refashioned, novel meanings diverging significantly from the originals.

An example is handorukīpā (ハンドルキーパー; "handle-keeper"), derived from "handle" with the meaning of "steering wheel", with the full phrase meaning designated driver. Some wasei-eigo terms are not recognizable as English words in English-speaking countries; one example is sukinshippu (スキンシップ; "skinship"), which refers to physical contact between close friends or loved ones and appears to be a portmanteau of skin and kinship. In other cases, a word may simply have gained a slightly different meaning; for instance, kanningu (カンニング) does not mean "cunning", but "cheating" (on an academic test). Some wasei-eigo are subsequently borrowed from Japanese into other languages, including English, such as the fandom slang word "waifu".

== Confusion with gairaigo ==
Wasei-eigo is often confused with gairaigo, which refers simply to loanwords or "words from abroad". Some of the main contributors to this confusion are the phonological and morphological transformations that they undergo to suit Japanese phonology and syllabary. These transformations often result in truncated (or "backclipped") words and words with extra vowels inserted to accommodate the Japanese mora syllabic structure. Wasei-eigo, on the other hand, is the re-working of and experimentation with these words that results in an entirely novel meaning as compared to the original intended meaning.

== Compared to other Japanese word classes ==
Wasei-eigo is distinct from Engrish, the misuse or corruption of the English language by native Japanese speakers, as it consists of words used in Japanese conversation, not an attempt at speaking English. These include acronyms and initialisms particular to Japan (see list of Japanese Latin alphabetic abbreviations). Wasei-eigo can be compared to wasei-kango (和製漢語; Japanese-created kango (Chinese compounds)), which are Japanese pseudo-sinicisms (Japanese words created from Chinese roots) and are also common.

== History and process ==
There was a large influx of English loanwords introduced to Japan during the Meiji period, which was an important factor in Japan's modernization. Because they were so quickly accepted into Japanese society, there was not a thorough understanding of the actual meaning of the word, leading to misinterpretations and deviations from their original meaning.

Since English loanwords are adopted into Japan intentionally (as opposed to diffusing "naturally" through language contact, etc.), the meaning often deviates from the original. When these loanwords become so deeply embedded in the Japanese lexicon, it leads to experimentation and re-fashioning of the words' meaning, thus resulting in wasei-eigo.

== In the media ==
Many scholars agree that the main proponent behind these wasei-eigo terms is the media, in order to create interest and novelty in their advertising and products. The use of English words is also an attempt by advertisers to portray a modern, cosmopolitan image – one that is often associated with Western culture.

== Social connotations and main users ==
Though there is disagreement about the assumption that the majority of wasei-eigo are created by advertisers, the audience that predominantly uses wasei-eigo is youth and women. Many Japanese consider English loanword usage to be more casual and as being used mainly among peers of the same status. In addition, many wasei-eigo words are used to camouflage risqué terms and ideas, such as rabuho (love hotels), or the many massaaji (massage) and saabisu (service) associated with taboo topics. Finally, wasei-eigo may be used to express a poetic and emphatic need of the speaker, resulting in a new term.

English loanwords are usually written in katakana, making it apparent that they are words non-native to Japan. This links the meanings of the words with the idea of "foreignness". Because of this, wasei-eigo (and some English loanwords) is often used as a method for speaking about taboo and controversial topics in a safe and neutral way. Further, being non-native Japanese words and marked as foreign in their writing, they can be associated with concepts and subjects that are non-normal, or uncommon in Japan.

== See also ==
- Engrish
- Wasei-kango
- List of gairaigo and wasei-eigo terms
- List of Japanese Latin alphabetic abbreviations
- Konglish – the same phenomenon in Korean language
- Bonin English, sometimes considered an Anglo-Japanese mixed language
