= Ateji =

Kanji used for some Japanese words in a primarily phonetic sense

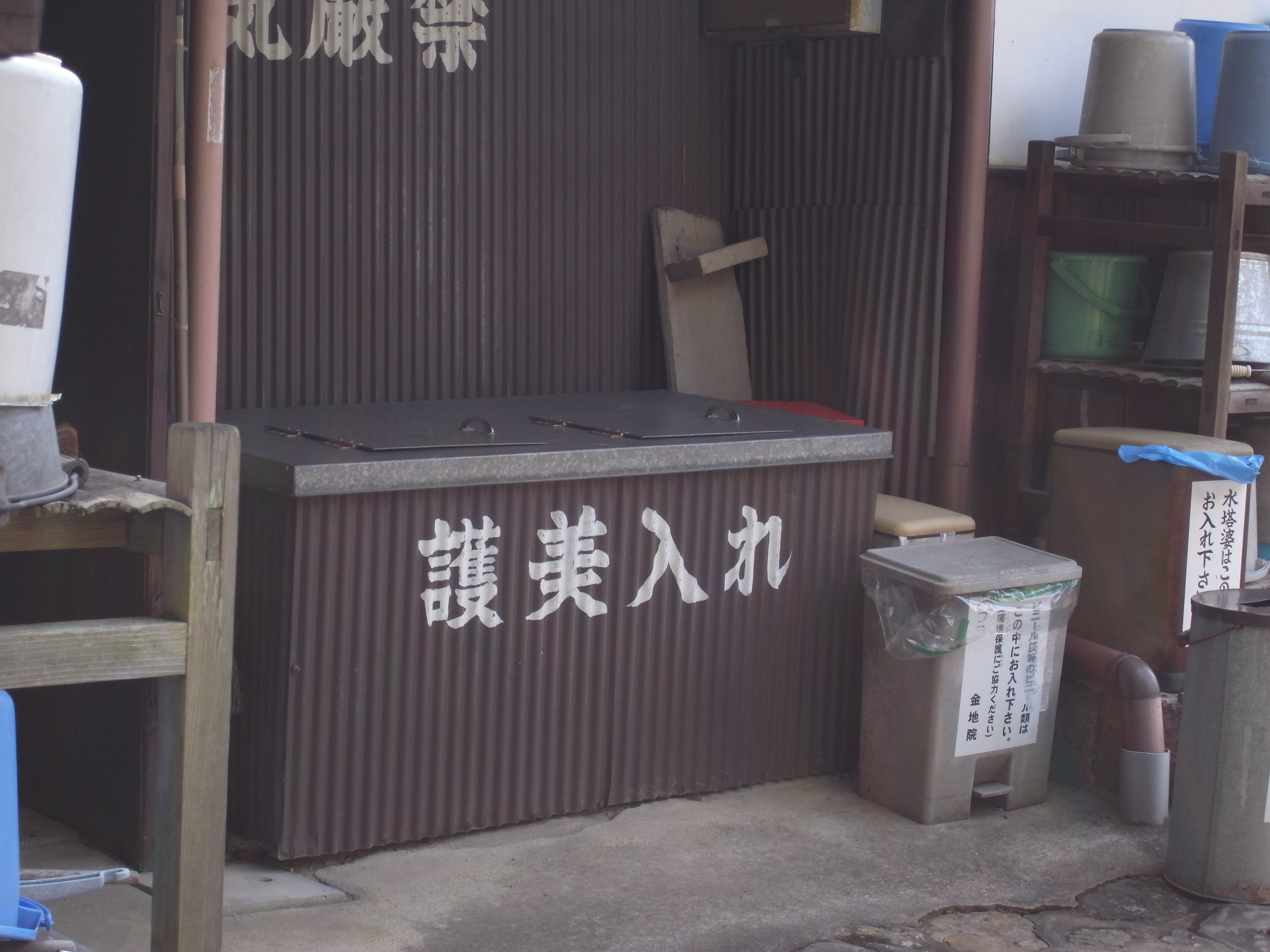
Ateji form of "trash bin" (ゴミ入れ, gomi-ire) as "護美入れ", using the ateji form of "ゴミ" ("gomi", "trash"), which literally translates as "protect beauty"

In modern Japanese, ateji (当て字, 宛字 or あてじ, pronounced [ate(d)ʑi]; "assigned characters") principally refers to kanji used to phonetically represent native or borrowed words with less regard to the underlying meaning of the characters. This is similar to man'yōgana in Old Japanese. Conversely, ateji also refers to kanji used semantically without regard to the readings.

For example, the word "sushi" is often written with its ateji "寿司". Though the two characters have the readings 'su' and 'shi' respectively, the character '寿' means "one's natural life span" and '司' means "to administer", neither of which has anything to do with the food. Ateji as a means of representing loanwords has been largely superseded in modern Japanese by the use of katakana, although many ateji coined in earlier eras still linger on.

== Usage ==
Ateji today are used conventionally for certain words, such as '寿司' ('sushi'), though these words may be written in hiragana (especially for native words), or katakana (especially for borrowed words), with preference depending on the particular word, context, and choice of the writer. Ateji are particularly common on traditional store signs and menus. For example, "tempura" may be written as '天麩羅'. The Japanese loanword for "coffee" is generally written using the katakana 'コーヒー', but on coffee shop signs and menus it may be written with the Chinese word "珈琲", which is then pronounced irregularly to their normal Japanese reading (their kun'yomi). In particular, ateji are frequently employed in manga and song lyrics by pairing kanji with furigana for creative effect and to add layers of meaning.

Many characters have gained meanings derived from ateji usage. For example, ateji were once widely utilized for foreign place names; such as in the ateji "ajia" (亜細亜) used to write "Asia". The original ateji word is now considered archaic, but the character '亜' has gained the meaning "Asia" in such compounds as "tōa" (東亜, East Asia), even though '亜' originally meant "sub-par" (and continues to). From the ateji "Amerika" (亜米利加, America), the second character was taken, resulting in the semi-formal coinage "Beikoku" (米国), which literally translates to "rice country" but means "United States of America"; however, "アメリカ" remains in far more common use in modern Japanese. Major natural gas companies in Japan use the ateji "gasu" (瓦斯, gas) in their company names, but use the katakana "ガス" in their trade names.

== Phono-semantic matching ==
When using ateji to represent loanwords, the kanji are sometimes chosen for both their semantic and phonetic values, a form of phono-semantic matching. A stock example is '倶楽部' ("kurabu") for "club", where the characters can be interpreted loosely in sequence as "together", "fun" and "place". Another example is '合羽' ("kappa") for the Portuguese capa, a kind of raincoat. The characters can mean "wings coming together", as the pointed capa resembles a bird with wings folded together.

== History ==
The ad hoc usage of Chinese characters for their phonetic values dates nearly to the introduction of Chinese characters to Japan. Two widespread uses of ateji came out of this. On one front, scholars and monks used kanji characters as translation aids between the lines of Chinese texts. On the other, poets simply used kanji phonetically to write in Japanese. Many different characters were used with the same sound values. This system of characters is called man'yōgana (万葉仮名), "alphabet of myriad leaves". The kana of modern Japanese, hiragana and katakana developed as organic simplifications of man'yōgana that were eventually codified.

Ateji are primarily used today for historical terms – in historical order, these are primarily Sanskrit terms dating from the introduction of Buddhism to Japan, Portuguese terms from the 16th and 17th centuries, and Dutch terms from the 17th, 18th, and 19th centuries. Ateji found some use in the Meiji period and in the 20th century, but has largely been superseded by katakana.

=== Sanskrit ===
In Buddhist Japanese, Sanskrit terms used in some chants also derive from ateji but were not called such. These Buddhist texts were translated into Chinese (in a Literary Chinese style) in China long ago. The translation rule for mantras was not to translate the mantra, but instead to represent it phonetically with Chinese characters. For the sutras, they were translated into Chinese Literary Language (Wenyan). The terms prajñāpāramitā (hannya-haramitta (般若波羅蜜多)) and samyaksaṃ-bodhi (sanmyakusanbodai (三藐三菩提)), or "perfection of wisdom" and "fully enlightened", both appear in the Heart Sutra, but are written using ateji.

== Related concepts ==
Kun-yomi (訓読み) ("Japanese-origin" readings) should not be confused with ateji. Whereas ateji are characters used to represent Japanese or borrowed words without regard to the meaning of those characters, kun'yomi are readings, typically words, of Japanese origin that have been officially applied to the borrowed Chinese characters, similar to Latin-Germanic origin synonyms in English.

When a native Japanese word is written as a compound by meaning only, and this spelling is established in the language, as in otona (大人, "adult"), the word is the semantic variety of ateji, and is known specifically as jukujikun (熟字訓, "established meaning-spellings").

Intentional improvised use of irregular kanji spellings (as opposed to spelling mistakes) are known as gikun (義訓, "improvised meaning-spellings"), and generally require furigana (notational reading characters) to be read properly. Many jukujikun may have started out as gikun. A loanword example is reading shukuteki (宿敵, "mortal enemy") as the English-derived word raibaru, or "rival".

While standardized ateji use okurigana, as in kawaii (可愛い) having the suffix 〜い in order to inflect as kawai-katta (可愛かった) for the past tense, gikun only intended for one-off usage need not have sufficient okurigana. For example, kara-i (辛い) ("spicy, salty") is an adjective requiring the suffix 〜い, but may also be spelt as, for example, ka-rai (花雷) (both legitimate on'yomi of the characters) on a poster, for example, where there is no intention of inflecting this spelling.

=== Single-character loan words ===
Most ateji are multi-character, but in rare cases they can be single-character, as in kan (缶) (simplification of '罐', for which kan is the Chinese-derived pronunciation), used for "can, metal tin" ('罐' originally meaning "metal pot, iron teakettle"). This is classified as ateji.

In some rare cases, an individual kanji has a loan word reading – that is, a character is given a new reading by borrowing a foreign word – though most often these words are written in katakana. The three most notable examples are pēji (頁, ページ, "page"), zero (零, ゼロ, "zero"), and dāsu (打, ダース, "dozen"). Botan (釦/鈕, ボタン) (from the Portuguese botão, "button") and mētoru (米, メートル, 'meter") are marginally understood or used in some settings, but most are obscure.

These are classed as kun'yomi of a single character, because the character is being used for meaning only (without the Chinese pronunciation), rather than as ateji, which is the classification used when a loanword term is using existing sounds only (as in 天麩羅 "tempura"), or alternatively as a compound with meaning only (as in 煙草 – the sound タバコ tabako cannot be broken down into readings of individual characters). In principle these could be considered as 1-character meaning-only ateji, but because the reading corresponds to a single character, these are considered readings instead. Note that while kun'yomi are generally written as hiragana when writing out the word in kana instead of kanji (being native Japanese), these gairaigo kun'yomi are generally written as katakana (being foreign borrowings).

Note that numerically, most of these characters are for units, particularly SI units, in many cases using new characters (kokuji) coined during the Meiji period, such as kiromētoru (粁, キロメートル, "kilometer") from 米 "meter" + 千 "thousand"; this character is obscure and not in common use.

Some non-kanji symbols or Latin character abbreviations also have loanword readings, often quite long. A common example is '%' (the percent sign), which has the five kana reading パーセント (pāsento), while the word "centimeter" is generally written as "㎝" (with two half-width characters, so occupying one space) and has the seven kana reading センチメートル (senchimētoru). It can also be written as 糎, as with kilometer above, though this is very rare. Many borrowed measurement terms may be written as tiny abbreviations stuffed into a single character space called "Platform-dependent Characters" (環境依存文字, kankyō-izon-moji): ㌢ (for centimeters; senchi), ㌔ (for kilo; kiro), amongst others.

In a few cases, the etymology of a word is unclear, and hence whether the term is a borrowing or not cannot be determined.

=== Kanbun ===
There are occasional spellings which derive from kanbun (Japanese form of literary Chinese), where the kanji form follows literary Chinese, but the pronunciation follows Japanese. An example of this is writing 不〜 (fu-, "no, not") before a kanji for a verb, corresponding to the verb inflection 〜ず (-zu) – for example, writing 不知 for 知らず shi-razu "not knowing". The word 不知 is read as shirazu (as if it were a native Japanese verb), though in this case 不知 is also a Sino-Japanese word (a noun), read as fuchi, meaning "ignorance". These are primarily found in older literature, but are occasionally used in variant spellings of everyday words, such as oya-shirazu (親不知, "wisdom tooth").

== See also ==
- Japanese exonyms
- Jiajie in Chinese
- Transcription into Chinese characters
- Transcription into Japanese
