= Popin =

Type of glass toy

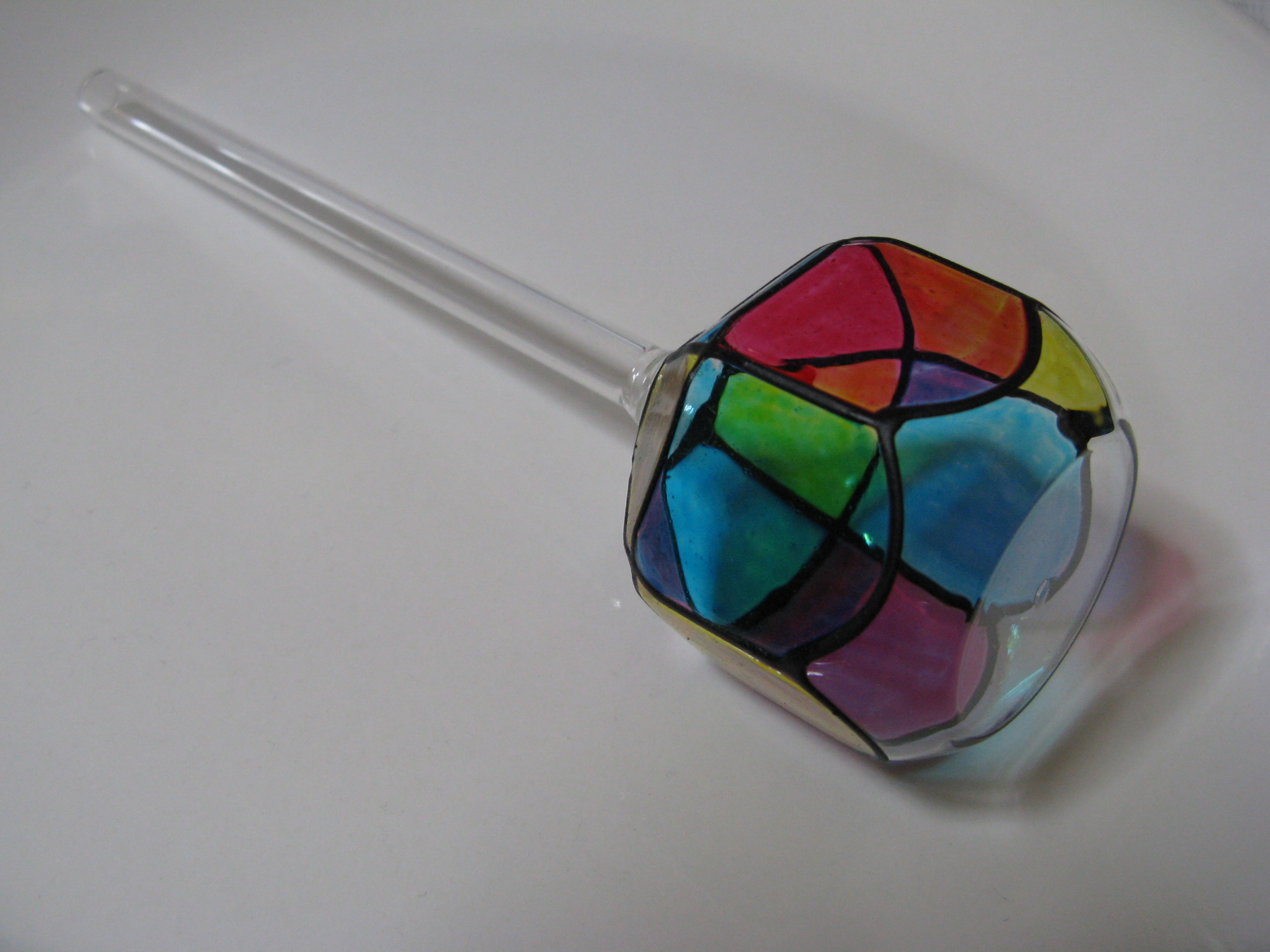
An example of a Poppin

Popin (also know as: Poppin, Poppen, Also called ponpin or pinpon), is a glass toy from the Edo period. It came from a toy from Dutch tradition, also called a Bidro. The origin of the word "Vidro" comes from the Portuguese word vidro (meaning glass).

It has a narrow flask-like neck with a thinner bottom. When you hold the long tubular neck in your mouth and breathe in and out, the pressure difference and the elasticity of the glass cause the bottom to dent or protrude, producing sound.

It was introduced from China in the late Edo period and became a huge phenomenon in the mid-Meiji period. It was said that blowing on the Pipro during New Year's was considered a protective charm for misfortune, and there was a time when it was treated as a lucky charm for the New Year. However, due to its fragility and susceptibility to injury, it gradually fell out of favor as a lucky charm.

At the Hojokai ceremony at Hakozaki Shrine in Fukuoka Prefecture, it is called 'Champon' and is distributed.
