= List of Japanese Latin alphabetic abbreviations =

Abbreviations are common in Japanese; these include many Latin alphabet letter combinations, generally pronounced as initialisms. Some of these combinations are common in English, but others are unique to Japan or of Japanese origin, and form a kind of wasei eigo (Japanese-coined English).

This is a list of Latin alphabet letter combinations used in Japan.

== A ==
- ADV – adventure game (also abbreviated as AVG)
- AV – adult video
- AV – audio-visual
- AVG – adventure game (also abbreviated as ADV)

== B ==
- BGM – background music
- BL – boys' love
- BS – Broadcast Satellite (Direct-broadcast satellite; also a prefix for BS stations)

== C ==
- CA – cabin attendant (flight attendant)
- CM – commercial message (television advertisement)
- CS – Communication Satellite
- CV – character voice (voice actor)

== D ==
- DC – danshi chūgakusei (男子中学生; male middle school student)
- DD – danshi daigakusei (男子大学生; male college student)
- DE – danshi enji (男子園児; male kindergartener)
- DK – danshi kousei (男子高生; male high school student)
- DS – danshi shougakusei (男子小学生; male elementary school student)
- DT – dōtei (童貞; male virgin)
- DV – Domestic Violence

== E ==
- ED – ending (an animated sequence which includes the closing credits, often used regarding anime)
- EV – elevator

== F ==
- FJK – first JK, fāsuto joshi kōsei (ファースト女子高生; first-year female high school student/female tenth-grade student)

== G ==
- GL – girls' love
- GP – grand prix
- GW – Golden Week Holiday

== H ==
- H – hentai, alternately written as ecchi; the meanings of these two terms have diverged.
- HP – home page (website)

== I ==
- IC card — contactless smart card (derives from the initialism IC which is occasionally used for an integrated circuit in English, although the meaning of the complete term is likely non-obvious for English speakers)
- IR – integrated resort

== J ==
- JC – joshi chūgakusei (女子中学生; female middle school student)
- JD – joshi daigakusei (女子大学生; female college student)
- JE – joshi enji (女子園児; female kindergartener)
- JH – Japan Highway Public Corporation
- JK – jōshikiteki ni kangaete (常識的に考えて; Internet slang for "thinking logically")
- JK – joshi kōsei (女子高生; female high school student)
- JR – Japan Railway
- JS – joshi shōgakusei (女子小学生; female elementary school student)
- JSDF – Japan Self-Defense Forces (also abbreviated as SDF)

== K ==
- KY – kūki yomenai (空気読めない; lit. "unable to read the air"); refers to someone who is unable to read a social situation.
- KSK – kekkon shite kudasai (結婚してください; lit. "marry me please"); an increasingly popular way to propose among young people.

== L ==
- LDK – Living Dining Kitchen; home type where the kitchen is merged to the living room
- LDP – the Liberal Democratic Party of Japan
- LJK – last JK, rasuto joshi kōsei (ラスト女子高生; last-year female high school student/female twelfth-grade student)

== M ==
- M – masochism (or characterized by or pertaining to it)
- MC – Master of ceremonies
- MJK – middle JK, midoru joshi kōsei (ミドル女子高生; middle-year female high school student/female eleventh-grade student)
- MV – music video

== N ==
- N'EX – Narita Express
- NG – no good (wasei-eigo term meaning the opposite of okay)
- NHK – Nippon Hōsō Kyōkai (日本放送協会)
- NJS – Nihon Jitensha Shinkōkai (日本自転車振興会) — Japanese Keirin Association

== O ==
- OA – office automation (i.e. the computerization of offices), opening act (as in live music performances)
- OB – old boy (male former student (alumnus), club member, teammate, employee, etc.)
- OG – old girl (female former student (alumna), club member, teammate, employee, etc.)
- OL – office lady (a female office worker)
- ONA - original net animation (anime directly released onto the Internet)
- OP – opening (title sequence, often used regarding anime)
- OSV – original sound version (video game soundtrack)
- OVA – original video animation (also abbreviated as OAV)

== P ==
- PS – police station
- PV – promotional video (usually refers specifically to music videos)

== R ==
- RPG – role-playing game (usually refers to role-playing video games)

== S ==
- S – sadism (or characterized by or pertaining to it)
- SD – super déformé (super deformed)
- SDF – Japan Self-Defense Forces (also abbreviated as JSDF)
- SJK – second JK, sekando joshi kōsei (セカンド女子高生; second-year female high school student/female eleventh-grade student)
- SNS – Social networking service, social website
- SS – service station
- STG – shooting game (shoot 'em up video game)

== T ==
- TQB – tei kyū bi (定休日; regular holiday or fixed day off)
- TPO – Time, Place, Occasion

== U ==
- UMA – unidentified mysterious animal (cryptid); coined in connection with unidentified flying object

== V ==
- VG – video game
- VTR – video tele-replay (the display of pre-recorded footage)

== W ==
- W – double (from the letter's name double-u)
- w – warau (笑う; Internet slang for "laugh out loud" (is usually stringed, e.g. "wwww"))
