= Loanwords in Japanese =

Gairaigo (外来語; Japanese pronunciation: [ɡaiɾaiɡo]) is Japanese for "loan word", and indicates a transcription into Japanese. In particular, the word usually refers to a Japanese word of foreign origin that was not borrowed in ancient times from Old or Middle Chinese (especially Literary Chinese), but in modern times, primarily from English, Portuguese, Dutch, and modern Chinese languages, such as Standard Chinese and Cantonese. These are primarily written in the katakana phonetic script, with a few older terms written in Chinese characters (kanji); the latter are known as ateji.

Japanese has many loan words from Chinese, accounting for a sizeable fraction of the language. These words were borrowed during ancient times and are written in kanji. Modern Chinese loanwords are generally considered gairaigo and written in katakana, or sometimes written in kanji (either with the more familiar word as a base text gloss and the intended katakana as furigana or vice versa); pronunciation of modern Chinese loanwords generally differs from the corresponding usual pronunciation of the characters in Japanese.

For a list of terms, see the List of gairaigo and wasei-eigo terms.

== Source languages ==
Japanese has a long history of borrowing from foreign languages. It has been doing so since the late fourth century AD. Some ancient gairaigo words are still being used nowadays, but there are also many kinds of gairaigo words that were borrowed more recently.

Most, but not all, modern gairaigo are derived from English, particularly in the post-World War II era (after 1945). Words are taken from English for concepts that do not exist in Japanese, but also for other reasons, such as a preference for English terms or fashionability – many gairaigo have Japanese near-synonyms.

In the past, more gairaigo came from other languages besides English. The first period of borrowing occurred during the late fourth century AD, when a massive number of Chinese characters were adopted. This period could be considered one of the most significant in the history of gairaigo, because it was the first moment when the written communication systems using kanji were formed.

The first non-Asian countries to have extensive contact with Japan were Portugal and the Netherlands in the 16th and 17th centuries, and Japanese has several loanwords from Portuguese and Dutch, many of which are still used. The interaction between Japan and Portugal lasted from the Late Middle Ages until the early Edo era (1549–1638). An example of the loanwords from Portuguese is rasha, meaning a thick wool cloth that was indispensable during the period, but not used often nowadays. In the Edo era (1603–1853), words from the Dutch language, such as glas, gas, and alcohol, started to have an impact in the Japanese language. Also, during the Edo era, many medical words like Gaze (meaning gauze) and neuroses came from German, and many artistic words such as rouge and dessin came from French. Most of the gairaigo since the nineteenth century came from English.

In the Meiji era (late 19th to early 20th century), Japan also had extensive contact with Germany, and gained many loanwords from German, particularly for Western medicine, which the Japanese learned from the Germans. Notable examples include arubaito (アルバイト; part-time work) (often abbreviated to baito (バイト)) from German Arbeit ("work"), and enerugī (エネルギー; energy) from German Energie. They also gained several loanwords from French at this time.

In modern times, there are some borrowings from Modern Chinese and Modern Korean, particularly for food names, and these continue as new foods become popular in Japan; standard examples include ūron (烏龍 ウーロン "oolong tea") and kimuchi (キムチ "kimchi"), respectively, while more specialized examples include hoikōrō (回鍋肉 ホイコーロー "twice cooked pork") from Chinese, and bibinba (ビビンバ "bibimbap") from Korean. Chinese words are often represented with Chinese characters, but with katakana gloss to indicate the unusual pronunciation, while Korean words, which no longer regularly use Chinese characters (hanja), are represented in katakana. There is sometimes ambiguity in pronunciation of these borrowings, particularly voicing, such as to (ト) vs. do (ド) – compare English's Daoism–Taoism romanization issue.

Some Modern Chinese borrowings occurred during the 17th and 18th centuries, due both to trade and resident Chinese in Nagasaki, and a more recent wave of Buddhist monks, the Ōbaku school, whose words are derived from languages spoken in Fujian. More recent Korean borrowings are influenced both by proximity, and to the substantial population of Koreans in Japan since the early 20th century.

In 1889, there were 85 gairaigo of Dutch origin and 72 gairaigo of English origin listed in a Japanese dictionary. From 1911 to 1924, 51% of gairaigo listed in dictionaries were of English origin, and today, 80% to 90% of gairaigo are of English origin.

There have been some borrowings from Sanskrit as well, most notably for religious terms. These words are generally transliterations which were unknowingly borrowed from Chinese.

=== Doublets ===
In some cases, doublets or etymologically related words from different languages may be borrowed and sometimes used synonymously or sometimes used distinctly.

The most common basic example is kappu (カップ; "cup (with handle), mug") from English cup versus earlier koppu (コップ; "cup (without handle), tumbler") from Dutch kop or Portuguese copo, where they are used distinctly. A similar example is gurasu (グラス; "glass (drinkware)") from English glass versus earlier garasu (ガラス; "glass (material); pane") from Dutch glas; thus garasu no gurasu (ガラスのグラス; "a glass glass") is not redundant but means a drinking vessel specifically made of glass (e.g. as opposed to plastic). A more technical example is sorubitōru (ソルビトール) (English sorbitol) versus sorubitto (ソルビット) (German Sorbit), used synonymously.

=== Wasei-kango ===
In addition to borrowings, which adopted both meaning and pronunciation, Japanese also has an extensive set of new words that are crafted using existing Chinese morphemes to express a foreign term. These are known as wasei-kango, "Japanese-made Chinese words". This process is similar to the creation of classical compounds in European languages. Many were coined in the Meiji period, and these are very common in medical terminology. These are not considered gairaigo, as the foreign word itself has not been borrowed, and sometimes a translation and a borrowing are both used.

== Writing ==
In written Japanese, gairaigo are usually written in katakana. Older loanwords are also often written using ateji (kanji chosen for their phonetic value, or sometimes for meaning instead) or hiragana, for example tabako from Portuguese, meaning "tobacco" or "cigarette" can be written タバコ (katakana), たばこ (hiragana), or 煙草 (the kanji for "smoke grass", but still pronounced tabako – an example of meaning-based ateji), with no change in meaning. Another common older example is tempura, which is usually written in mixed kanji/kana (mazegaki) as 天ぷら, but is also written as てんぷら, テンプラ, 天麩羅 (rare kanji) or 天婦羅 (common kanji) – here it is sound-based ateji, with the characters used for their phonetic values only.

Few gairaigo are sometimes written with a single kanji character (chosen for meaning or newly created); consequently, these are considered kun'yomi rather than ateji because the single characters are used for meaning rather than for sound and are often written as katakana. An example is pēji (頁、ページ; page); see single-character loan words for details.

== False friends and wasei-eigo ==
There are numerous causes for confusion in gairaigo: (1) gairaigo are often abbreviated, (2) their meaning may change (either in Japanese or in the original language after the borrowing has occurred), (3) many words are not borrowed but rather coined in Japanese (wasei-eigo "English made in Japan"), and (4) not all gairaigo come from English.

Due to Japanese pronunciation rules and its mora-based phonology, many words take a significant amount of time to pronounce. For example, a one-syllable word in a language such as English (brake) often becomes several syllables when pronounced in Japanese (in this case, burēki (ブレーキ), which amounts to four moras). The Japanese language, therefore, contains many abbreviated and contracted words, and there is a strong tendency to shorten words. This also occurs with gairaigo words. For example, "remote control", when transcribed in Japanese, becomes rimōto kontorōru (リモートコントロール), but this has then been simplified to rimokon (リモコン). For another example, the transcribed word for "department store" is depātomento sutoa (デパートメントストア) but has since been shortened to depāto (デパート). Clipped compounds, such as wāpuro (ワープロ) for "word processor", are common. Karaoke (カラオケ), a combination of the Japanese word kara "empty" and the clipped form, oke, of the English loanword "orchestra" (J. ōkesutora オーケストラ), is a clipped compound that has entered the English language. Japanese ordinarily takes the first part of a foreign word, but in some cases the second syllable is used instead; notable examples from English include hōmu (ホーム; from "(train station) plat-form") and nerushatsu (ネルシャツ; "flan-nel shirt").

Some Japanese people are not aware of the origins of the words in their language, and may assume that all gairaigo words are legitimate English words. For example, Japanese people may use words like tēma (テーマ, from German Thema, meaning "topic/theme") in English, or rimokon, not realizing that the contraction of "remote control" to rimokon took place in Japan.

Similarly, gairaigo, while making Japanese easier to learn for foreign students in some cases, can also cause problems due to independent semantic progression. For example, English "stove", from which sutōbu (ストーブ) is derived, has multiple meanings. Americans often use the word to mean a cooking appliance, and are thus surprised when Japanese take it to mean a space heater (such as a wood-burning stove). The Japanese term for a cooking stove is another gairaigo term, renji (レンジ), from the English "range"; a gas stove is a gasurenji (ガスレンジ).

Additionally, Japanese combines words in ways that are uncommon in English. As an example, left over is a baseball term for a hit that goes over the left-fielder's head rather than uneaten food saved for a later meal. This is a term that appears to be a loan but is actually wasei-eigo.

It is sometimes difficult for students of Japanese to distinguish between gairaigo, giseigo (onomatopoeia) and gitaigo (ideophones: words that represent the manner of an action, like "zigzag" in English — jiguzagu ジグザグ in Japanese), which are also written in katakana.

Wasei-eigo presents more difficulties for Japanese and learners of Japanese as such words, once entered the lexicon, combine to form any number of potentially confusing combinations. For example, the loanwords chance, pink, erotic, over, down, up, in, my, and boom have all entered wasei-eigo lexicon, combining with Japanese words and other English loanwords to produce any number of combination words and phrases. 'Up', or appu, is famously combined with other words to convey an increase or improvement, such as seiseki appu (increased results) and raifu appu (improved quality of life). 'My', or mai, also regularly appears in advertisements for any number and genre of items. From "My Fanny" toilet paper to "My Hand" electric hand drills, mai serves as a common advertising tool. Infamously, the beverage brand Calpis sold a product named mai pisu or 'my piss' for a short time.

Wasei-eigo is often employed to disguise or advertise risque or sexual terms and innuendos, especially when used by women. Wasei-eigo terms referencing a person's characteristics, personality, and habits also commonly appear as Japanese street slang, from poteto chippusu or 'potato chips' for a hick and esu efu 'SF' for a 'sex friend'.

== Grammatical function ==
Gairaigo are generally nouns, which can be subsequently used as verbs by adding auxiliary verb -suru (〜する; "to do"). For example, "play soccer" is translated as サッカーをする (sakkā o suru).

Some exceptions exist, such as sabo-ru (サボる; "cut class", from sabotage), which conjugates as a normal Japanese verb – note the unusual use of katakana (サボ) followed by hiragana (る). Another example is gugu-ru (ググる, "to google"), which conjugates as a normal Japanese verb, in which the final syllable is converted into okurigana to enable conjugation.

Gairaigo function as do morphemes from other sources, and, in addition to wasei eigo (words or phrases from combining gairaigo), gairaigo can combine with morphemes of Japanese or Chinese origin in words and phrases, as in jibīru (地ビール; local beer) (compare jizake (地酒; local sake)), yūzāmei (ユーザー名; user name) (compare shimei (氏名; full name)) or seiseki-appu (成績アップ; improve (one's) grade).

In set phrases, there is sometimes a preference to use all gairaigo (in katakana) or all kango/wago (in kanji), as in マンスリーマンション (mansurii manshon, monthly apartment) versus 月極駐車場 (tsukigime chūshajō, monthly parking lot), but mixed phrases are common, and may be used interchangeably, as in テナント募集 (tenanto boshū) and 入居者募集 (nyūkyosha boshū), both meaning "looking for a tenant".

== Phonology ==
Borrowings traditionally have had pronunciations that conform to Japanese phonology and phonotactics. For example, platform was borrowed as /hōmu/, because */fo/ is not a sound combination that traditionally occurs in Japanese. However, in recent years, some gairaigo are pronounced more closely to their original sound, which is represented by non-traditional combinations of katakana, generally using small katakana or diacritics (voicing marks) to indicate these non-traditional sounds. Compare iyahon (イヤホン; "ear-phones") and sumaho (スマホ, "smart phone"), where traditional sounds are used, and sumātofon (スマートフォン; "smart-phone"), a variant of the latter word using traditional sounds, where the non-traditional combination フォ (fu-o) is used to represent the non-traditional sound combination /fo/. This leads to long words; e.g., the word for "fanfare" is spelled out as fanfāre (ファンファーレ), with seven kana, no shorter than the Roman alphabet original (it is possible that it was not loaned from English because the "e" is not silent).

Similarly, Japanese traditionally does not have any /v/ phoneme, instead approximating it with /b/, but today /v/ (normally realized not as [v] but as bilabial [β]) is sometimes used in pronunciations: for example, "violin" can be pronounced either baiorin (バイオリン) or vaiorin (ヴァイオリン), with ヴァ (literally "voiced u"+"a") representing /va/.

Another example of the Japanese transformation of English pronunciation is takushī (タクシー), in which the two-syllable word taxi becomes three syllables (and four morae, thanks to long ī) because consonant clusters do not occur in traditional Japanese (with the exception of the coda ん/ン or /n/), and in which the sound [si] ("see") of English is pronounced [ɕi] (which to monoglot English speakers will sound like "she") because /si/ in Japanese is realized as such.

This change in Japanese phonology following the introduction of foreign words (here primarily from English) can be compared to the earlier posited change in Japanese phonology following the introduction of Chinese loanwords, such as closed syllables (CVC, not just CV) and length becoming a phonetic feature with the development of both long vowels and long consonants – see Early Middle Japanese: Phonological developments.

Due to the difficulties that Japanese have in distinguishing "l" and "r", this expansion of Japanese phonology has not extended to use of different kana for /l/ vs. /r/, though application of handakuten for representing /l/ has been proposed as early as Meiji era. Therefore, words with /l/ or /r/ may be spelled identically if borrowed into Japanese. One important exception, however, does occur due to the fact that Japanese typically borrows English words in a non-rhotic fashion.

== As a built-in lexicon of English ==
The English words that are borrowed into Japanese include many of the most useful English words, including high-frequency vocabulary and academic vocabulary. Thus gairaigo may constitute a useful built-in lexicon for Japanese learners of English.

Gairaigo have been observed to aid a Japanese child's learning of English vocabulary. With adults, gairaigo assist in English-word aural recognition and pronunciation, spelling, listening comprehension, retention of spoken and written English, and recognition and recall at especially higher levels of vocabulary. Moreover, in their written production, students of Japanese prefer using English words that have become gairaigo to those that have not.

== Misconceptions ==
The word arigatō (Japanese for "thank you") sounds similar to the Portuguese word obrigado, which has the same meaning. Given the number of borrowings from Portuguese, it may seem reasonable to suppose that the Japanese imported that word—which is the explanation accepted and indeed published by many. However, arigatō is not a gairaigo; rather, it is an abbreviation of arigatō gozaimasu, which consists of an inflection of the native Japanese adjective arigatai (有難い) combined with the polite verb gozaimasu. There is evidence, for example in the Man'yōshū, that the word arigatai was in use several centuries before contact with the Portuguese. This makes the two terms false cognates. If the Portuguese word had been borrowed, it would most likely have taken the form オブリガド (oburigado), or maybe ōrigado (due to historical afu and ofu collapsing to ō), and while it is even possible that it would be spelled with 有難 as ateji, it would regardless start with o rather than a, and the final o would have been short rather than long.

== Reborrowings from Japanese ==
Some gairaigo words have been reborrowed into their original source languages, particularly in the jargon of fans of Japanese entertainment. For example, anime (アニメ) is gairaigo derived from the English word for "animation", but has been reborrowed by English with the meaning of "Japanese animation". Similarly, puroresu (プロレス) derives from "professional wrestling", and has been adopted by English-speaking wrestling fans as a term for the style of pro wrestling performed in Japan. Kosupure (コスプレ), or cosplay, was formed from the English words "costume play", referring to dressing in costumes such as those of anime, manga, or videogame characters, and is now commonly used in English and other languages (also using Western cartoon realms).

There are also rare examples of borrowings from Indo-European languages, which have subsequently been borrowed by other Indo-European languages, thus yielding distant cognates. An example is ikura (イクラ; salmon eggs), originally borrowed from Russian икра (ikra), and possibly distantly cognate (from the same Indo-European root) to English "roe" (fish eggs), though the only indication is the shared "r".

== See also ==
- Cognate
- List of gairaigo and wasei-eigo terms
  - Japanese words of Portuguese origin
  - Japanese words of Dutch origin
- Engrish
- Transcription into Japanese
- List of English words of Japanese origin
- Japanese Pidgin English
