= List of Japanese words of Dutch origin =

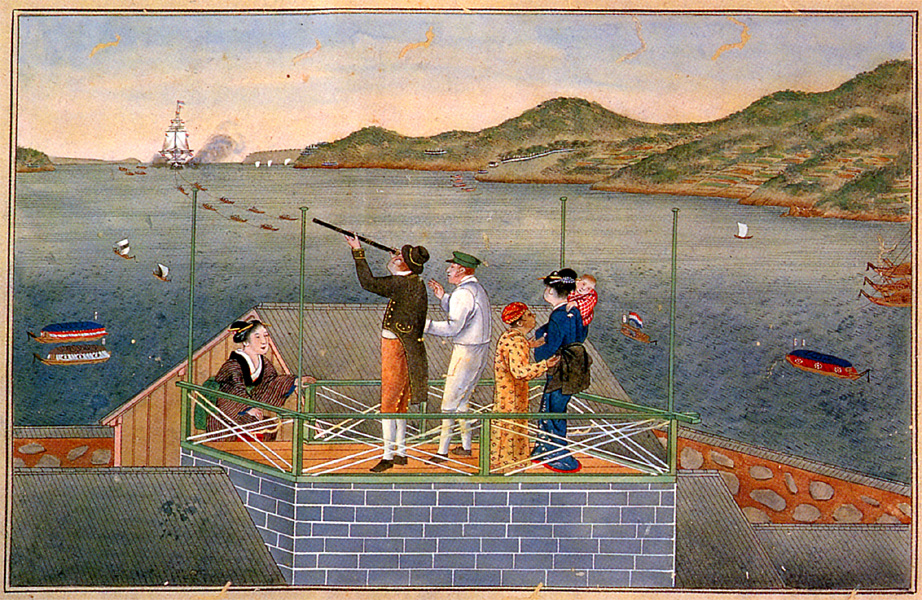
Arrival of a Dutch Ship by Kawahara Keiga. Philipp Franz von Siebold at Dejima with his Japanese wife Kusumoto Otaki and their baby-daughter Kusumoto Ine observing a Dutch ship towed into Nagasaki harbour. His fellow Heinrich Bürger using a teresukoppu (telescope).

Japanese words of Dutch origin started to develop when the Dutch East India Company initiated trading in Japan from the factory of Hirado in 1609. In 1640, the Dutch were transferred to Dejima, and from then on until 1854 remained the only Westerners allowed access to Japan, during Japan's sakoku seclusion period.

Numerous exchanges occurred, leading to a branch of Western learning in Japan known as rangaku (蘭学), or "Dutch learning", where the ran (蘭; "Dutch") in rangaku comes from Oranda, the Japanese word for Holland; gaku (学) is of Sino-Japanese origin and means "learning". In the process, a number of terms were adopted from Dutch into the Japanese language. At one point, some 3,000 words are thought to have been used, especially in the areas of technical and scientific vocabulary. About 160 such words of Dutch origin remain in use today in standard Japanese.

Japanese transliteration (rōmaji)	Japanese term (kanji or kana)	original Dutch term	English translation of Dutch	Meaning of Japanese term	Details
arukari	アルカリ	alkali	alkali	alkali	From Arabic, through Dutch.
arukōru	アルコール	alcohol	alcohol	alcohol (chemistry), alcoholic drink	From Arabic, through Dutch.
asubesuto	アスベスト	asbest	asbestos	asbestos	From Greek, through Dutch.
bīru	ビール, 麦酒	bier	beer	beer	
bisuketto	ビスケット	beschuit	biscuit	biscuit	Reinforcement of Portuguese biscoito.
bōru	ボール	boor	bore	drill, bore	After 1720.
buriki	ブリキ	blik	tin (can)	tinplate	
chifusu	チフス	tyfus	typhus	typhus	From Greek, through Dutch.
chinki	チンキ	tinctuur	tincture	tincture	Shortened from chinkityūru (チンキテュール).
doitsu	ドイツ	Duits	German	Germany	
dokku	ドック	dok	dock	dry dock	Also a contraction of ningen dokku (ja:人間ドック, (literary: human dry dock) routine physical examination).
dontaku	ドンタク	zondag	Sunday	Sunday	Also occasionally found as zontaku (ゾンタク). Appears from the early Meiji period, after 1868. (As of 2021) usage reduced to specific terms e.g. Hakata Dontaku.
doronken	ドロンケン	dronken	drunk	drunk	obsolete
ekisu	エキス	extract	extract	extract	Shortened from ekisutorakuto (エキストラクト).
erekishiteito	エレキシテイト	elektriciteit	electricity	electricity	Obsolete, replaced by denki (電気).
erekiteru	エレキテル	corruption of elektriciteit	electricity	elekiter	A type of electrostatic generator used for electric experiments in the 18th century.
ēteru	エーテル	ether	ether	ether, aether	From Greek, through Dutch. "Ethernet" is pronounced īsanetto from English.
garasu	ガラス, 硝子	glas	glass (of a window)	glass (the material)	
gasu	ガス, 瓦斯	gas	gas	gas	
giyaman	ギヤマン	diamant	diamond	diamond, glass (the material)	Obsolete. From Greek, through Dutch.
gomu	ゴム	gom, gum	rubber	rubber	
gorofukuren	ゴロフクレン, 呉絽服連	grofgrein	grosgrain	grosgrain	Obsolete
hamu	ハム	ham	ham	ham	
handon	半ドン, ハンドン	zondag	Sunday	half-day; holiday	Compound of Japanese han (half) and dontaku (< zondag). This word is no longer commonly used in Japanese.
hatoron	ハトロン, パトロン	patroon	cartridge (firearms)	cartridge case (firearms)	Obsolete. Only remain in hatoronshi (ja:ハトロン紙, kraft paper).
henrūda	ヘンルーダ	wijnruit	common rue	common rue	
hetto	ヘット	vet	fat	beef tallow	Cognate with English fat.
hisuterii	ヒステリー	hysterie	hysteria	hysteria	
hokku	ホック	hoek	hook	hook	Cognate with English hook.
infuruenza	インフルエンザ	influenza	influenza	influenza	After 1720. More likely borrowed from English. The term originated in Italian, and became common worldwide in the 18th century via English.
inki	インキ	inkt	ink	ink	
kamitsure	カミツレ	kamille	camomile	camomile	From Greek, through Dutch and Chinese. The medial -tsu appears due to the Japanese reading of the Chinese spelling 加密列. After 1720; first imported in 1818, and first attested in 1822.
kantera	カンテラ	kandelaar	candlestick	kerosene lamp	
kapitan	カピタン, 甲比丹	kapitein	captain	(obsolete: captain), chief of Dutch East India Company's post in Japan	More likely derived from Portuguese capitão.
karan	カラン	kraan	tap (UK) / faucet (Am.)	tap (UK) / faucet (Am.)	Cognate with English crane, from the resemblance of the bird's neck to a faucet pipe.
kari	カリ, カリウム	kali, kalium	potassium	potassium	
karuki	カルキ	kalk	lime (the chemical), chlorinated lime	lime (the chemical), chlorinated lime	Cognate with English chalk.
katēteru	カテーテル	katheter	catheter	catheter	From Greek, through Dutch.
kechin	ケチン	ketting	chain	chain	After 1720. Now obsolete (replaced by kusari (鎖)).
keido	珪土	keiaarde	silica	silica	Calque. The initial element kei is a phonetic borrowing from the kei in the Dutch term keiaarde, and the do in the Japanese (土, "earth, soil") is a translation of the aarde ("earth, soil") of the Dutch term. First appears in 1877. Now obsolete, replaced by shirika (シリカ) from English silica.
kiruku / koruku	キルク / コルク	kurk	cork	cork	
kōhī	コーヒー, 珈琲	koffie	coffee	coffee	From Arabic, through Dutch.
kokku	コック	kok	cook	chef	
koppu	コップ	kop	cup	cup	Reinforcement of Portuguese copo.
konpasu	コンパス	kompas	compass	compass	
korera	コレラ	cholera	cholera	cholera	From Greek, through Dutch.
kureosōto	クレオソート	creosoot	creosote	creosote	
madorosu	マドロス	matroos	sailor	sailor	
masuto	マスト	mast	mast	mast	
mesu	メス	mes	knife	scalpel	After 1720.
moruhine	モルヒネ	morfine	morphine	morphine	After 1720.
morumotto	モルモット	marmot	marmot	Guinea pig	
nisu	ニス	vernis	varnish	varnish	
oburāto	オブラート	oblaat	wafer	oblaat	Also listed in some Japanese sources as deriving from the cognate German term Oblate.
orugōru	オルゴール	(orgel) muziekdoos	(organ) music box	(organ) music box	
penki	ペンキ	pek, pik	house paint	house paint	
pesuto	ペスト	pest	black death	black death	After 1720.
pinto	ピント	punt	focus	focus	Shortened from the longer term brandpunt.
pisutoru	ピストル	pistool	pistol	pistol	
ponpu	ポンプ	pomp	pump	pump	After 1720.
ponzu	ポン酢	pons		ponzu	The Dutch term pons for the beverage was already obsolescent by 1864, and was eventually superseded by the term punsch or punch.
randoseru	ランドセル	ransel	backpack	randoseru	From German Ränzel or Low German rensel, through Dutch.
ranpu	ランプ, 洋灯	lamp	lamp	lamp	From Greek, through Dutch.
retoruto	レトルト	retort	retort	retort, retort pouch	
renzu	レンズ	lens	lens	lens	
safuran	サフラン	saffraan	saffron	saffron	
saten	サテン	satijn	satin	satin	
seimi	セイミ, 舎密	chemie	chemistry	chemistry	Now obsolete, replaced by kagaku (化学).
shian	シアン	cyaan	cyan	cyan	
shiroppu	シロップ	siroop	syrup	syrup	
sukoppu	スコップ	schop	trowel	trowel	Cognate with English scoop.
supoito	スポイト	spuit	syringe	syringe	Cognate with English spout.
tarumomētoru	タルモメートル	thermometer	thermometer	thermometer	From French, through Dutch. After 1720. Now obsolete; replaced by taionkei (体温計).
teresukoppu	テレスコップ	telescoop	telescope	telescope	From Italian and Modern Latin, through Dutch. After 1720. Replaced by bōenkyō (望遠鏡).
yojiumu	ヨジウム	jodium	iodine	iodine	Now transformed into yōso (ja:ヨウ素, iodine).
zukku	ズック	doek	canvas	canvas, canvas shoes	Both Japanese zukku and English duck ("piece of cloth") are borrowings from Dutch doek.

== See also ==
- Gairaigo
- List of gairaigo and wasei-eigo terms
- Japanese words of Portuguese origin
