= List of English words of Japanese origin =

Words of Japanese origin have entered many languages. Some words are simple transliterations of Japanese language words for concepts inherent to Japanese culture. The words on this page are an incomplete list of words which are listed in major English dictionaries and whose etymologies include Japanese. The reverse of this list can be found at List of gairaigo and wasei-eigo terms.

== Arts ==
anime
アニメ, hand-drawn and computer animation originating from or associated with Japan; refers to animation in general in Japan.
bokeh
(from ぼけ boke), subjective aesthetic quality of out-of-focus areas of an image projected by a camera lens.
bonsai
盆栽, "tray gardening"; the art of tending miniature trees. Originated from Chinese 盆栽 penzai
bunraku
文楽, a form of traditional Japanese puppet theatre, performed by puppeteers, chanters, and shamisen players.
haiku
俳句, a very short poem consisting of three lines of 5, 7, and 5 morae (not syllables as commonly thought) each; see also tanka below.
ikebana
生花, flower arrangement.
imari
伊万里, Japanese porcelain wares (made in the town of Arita and exported from the port of Imari, particularly around the 17th century).
isekai
異世界, "different world"; a subgenre of portal fantasy that features a protagonist being transported to or reincarnated in an alternate world
kabuki
歌舞伎, a traditional form of Japanese theatre; also any form of elaborate theatre, especially metaphorically.
kaiju
怪獣, Japanese genre of horror and science fiction films featuring giant monsters.
kakemono
掛け物, a vertical Japanese scroll, of ink-and-brush painting or calligraphy, that hangs in a recess on a wall inside a room.
kakiemon
柿右衛門, Japanese porcelain wares featuring enamel decoration (made in Arita, using the style developed in the 17th century by 酒井田 柿右衛門 Sakaida Kakiemon).
karaoke
カラオケ, (English IPA: /ˈkæriːoʊki/) "empty orchestra"; entertainment where an amateur singer accompanies recorded music.
kintsugi
金継ぎ, the artisanry of repairing broken pottery using urushi lacquer and dusted with powdered gold, silver, or platinum, to emphasise the damage. lit. "golden joinery". Also known as kintsukuroi 金繕い, "golden repair". Also in extended use: an aesthetic or world view highlighting imperfection and healing as an essential part of human experience.
kirigami
切り紙, similar to origami, but involves cutting in addition to folding.
koto
琴, a traditional stringed musical instrument from Japan, resembling a zither with 13 strings.
makimono
巻物, a horizontal Japanese hand scroll, of ink-and-brush painting or calligraphy
manga
まんが or 漫画, (English IPA: /ˈmæŋɡə/) Japanese comics; refers to comics in general in Japanese
noh
能 nō, a major form of classical Japanese music drama
origami
折り紙, artistic paper folding. (British English IPA: /ˈɒrɪɡɑːmi/)
otaku
オタク or おたく or ヲタク, a geeky enthusiast, especially of anime and manga.
sakura
(桜 or 櫻; さくら or サクラ) is the Japanese term for the Cherry Blossom and can either mean the tree or its flowers (see 桜).
senryu
川柳, a form of short poetry similar to haiku. It is satiric.
shamisen
三味線, a three-stringed musical instrument, played with a plectrum.
sumi-e
墨絵, a general term for painting with a brush and black ink.
tanka
短歌, "short poetry"; an older form of Japanese poetry than haiku, of the form 5-7-5-7-7 morae (not syllables; see also haiku above).
tankōbon
単行本, "independent/standalone book"; term for a book that is complete in itself and is not part of a series or corpus. In modern Japan, though, it is most often used in reference to individual volumes of a single manga, as opposed to magazines.
tokusatsu
特撮, "special photography", term for films or television shows that feature an abundant usage of special practical effects; the term is most commonly associated with Japanese science fiction and giant monster franchises
ukiyo-e
浮世絵, a type of woodblock print art or painting. (English IPA: /ˈuːkiːoʊ.iː/)
waka
和歌, "Japanese poetry"; a word used primarily to describe tanka (see above) written between the 9th and 19th centuries.
wabi-sabi
侘び寂び, a world view or aesthetic centered on the acceptance of transience and imperfection.

== Business ==
kaikaku
改革, Japanese term for 'radical change', used in contradistinction to kaizen which is used for continuous improvement.
kaizen
改善, literally "change for the better." In practice, a Japanese business philosophy of continuous improvement of working practices, personal efficiency, etc. Initially made famous by the 1986 book of same name.
kanban
看板, literally a "signal" or "sign" signals a cycle of replenishment for production and materials and maintains an orderly and efficient flow of materials throughout the entire manufacturing process.
karoshi
過労死, "death by overwork, stress death"
keiretsu
系列, a set of companies with interlocking business relationships and shareholdings.
Poka-yoke
ポカヨケ, "mistake-proofing" or "inadvertent error prevention".
tycoon
大君 ("taikun"), "great prince" or "high commander", later applied to wealthy business leaders.
zaibatsu
財閥, a "money clique" or conglomerate

== Clothing ==
geta
下駄, a pair of Japanese raised wooden clogs worn with traditional Japanese garments, such as the kimono
inro
印籠 inrō, a case for holding small objects, often worn hanging from the obi; (traditional Japanese clothes didn't have pockets)
kimono
着物, a traditional full-length robe-like garment still worn by women, men and children. (English IPA: /kɪˈmoʊnoʊ/)
netsuke
根付, a toggle used to tie the sash of a kimono also to attach small items such as inro and kinchaku: sometimes beautifully carved.
obi
帯, a wide belt that is tied in the back to secure a kimono
yukata
浴衣, a casual or simplified summer style of kimono
zori
草履 zōri, sandals made from rice straw or lacquered wood, worn with a kimono for formal occasions

== Culinary ==
adzuki, azuki bean
あずき or 小豆, type of bean grown in eastern Asia and the Himalayas, used in Chinese, Korean, and Japanese cuisines, usually served sweet. Sometimes simply referred to as red bean or red bean paste in English.
arame
荒布, a type of edible seaweed
bento
弁当 bentō, a single-portion takeout meal, box lunch
daikon
大根, a kind of white radish
dashi
だし or 出汁, a simple soup stock considered fundamental to Japanese cooking
edamame
枝豆, soybeans boiled whole in the green pod and served with salt
enokitake, enoki mushroom
えのきたけ or 榎茸, long, thin white mushrooms, used in Japanese, Korean and Chinese cuisines
fugu
河豚 or フグ, the meat of the toxic pufferfish, must be prepared by specially trained chefs by law. Also means pufferfish itself.
ginkgo
銀杏 or ぎんなん ginnan, a gymnospermous tree (Ginkgo biloba) of eastern China that is widely grown as an ornamental or shade tree and has fan-shaped leaves and yellow fruit (the word is derived from 17th Century Japanese 銀杏 ginkyō)
gyoza
ギョーザ or 餃子 gyōza, Japanese name for Chinese dumplings, jiaozi (jiǎozi); may also be called pot stickers in English if they are fried
hibachi
火鉢, a small, portable charcoal grill; used in North America to refer to a teppan or a small shichirin-like aluminium or cast iron grill
hijiki
ひじき or 鹿尾菜, a type of edible seaweed commonly found on rocky coastlines

kaiseki
懐石, a highly ritual Japanese meal.
katsu
カツ, Japanese term for cutlets in general; in English, typically refers to the dish chicken katsu, a type of breaded chicken cutlet served with rice and sauce. (English IPA: /ˈkætsuː/)
katsuo
鰹, a skipjack tuna
katsuobushi
かつおぶし or 鰹節, dried and smoked skipjack tuna (katsuo), which is shaved and then used in dashi
koji
麴 or 麹 kōji, a fungus that is the active agent in the fermentation processes, of producing miso and soy sauce from soybeans, and of producing sake and shōchū from rice.
kombu
昆布, dried kelp, which can be eaten or used for dashi
matcha
抹茶, finely ground green tea grown under special shading conditions
matsutake
松茸, a type of edible mushroom, with a magnificently spicy aroma similar to cinnamon, considered to be a great delicacy and the most coveted mushroom in Japan
mirin
味醂, an essential condiment of the Japanese cuisine, a kind of rice wine similar to sake with a slightly sweet taste
miso
味噌, a thick paste made by fermenting soybeans with salt
mizuna
水菜, an edible plant, with flavor akin to the mustard plant
mochi
餅, sticky rice cake
napa cabbage
菜っ葉, Chinese cabbage, (in Japan, it is a generic term for leaf vegetables.)
nashi (pear)
梨, a species of pear native to eastern Asia, which are juicy, round and shaped like apples. Often simply referred to as "asian pear(s)".
nasubi
なすび, a nightshade vegetable, popularized by the reality TV icon
natto
納豆, traditional Japanese food made from fermented soybeans
nori
海苔, food products created from green laver seaweed species by a shredding and rack-drying process that resembles papermaking.
okonomiyaki
お好み焼き, listen^{ⓘ} is a Japanese teppanyaki, savory pancake dish consisting of wheat flour batter and other ingredients (mixed, or as toppings) cooked on a teppan (flat griddle).
omakase
お任せ, is a phrase used when ordering food in restaurants that means 'I'll leave it up to you'
panko
パン粉, Japanese white bread flakes. Panko is made from bread without crusts, thus it has a crisper, airier texture than most types of breading found in Western cuisine.
ramen
ラーメン rāmen, the Japanese version of Chinese noodle soup, not limited to the instant variety. (British English IPA: /ˈrɑːmən/
sake
酒, nihon-shu(日本酒), an alcoholic beverage, brewed from rice. In Japanese, the word commonly refers to alcoholic drinks in general
sashimi
刺身, a Japanese delicacy primarily consisting of the freshest raw seafoods thinly sliced and served with only a dipping sauce and wasabi.
satsuma
(from 薩摩 Satsuma, an ancient province of Japan), a type of mandarin orange (mikan) native to Japan
shabu shabu
しゃぶしゃぶ, a meal where each person cooks their own food in their own cooking pot from an assortment of raw ingredients
shiitake
しいたけ or 椎茸, an edible mushroom typically cultivated on the shii tree
shoyu
醬油 or 醤油shōyu, Japanese soy sauce
soba
蕎麦 or ソバ, thin brown buckwheat noodles
soy
from shoyu 醤油
sukiyaki
すき焼き or スキヤキ, a dish in the nabemono-style (one-pot), consisting of thinly sliced beef, tofu, konnyaku noodles, negi, Chinese cabbage (bok choy), and enoki mushrooms among others
surimi
すり身 or 擂り身, processed meat made from cheaper white-fleshed fish, to imitate the look of a more expensive meat such as crab legs. In Japan surimi is the term for processed fish paste itself, that was traditionally ground in a suribachi mortar.
sushi
鮨 or 鮓 or 寿司, a dish consisting of vinegared rice combined with other ingredients such as raw fish, raw or cooked shellfish, or vegetables
takoyaki
たこ焼, たこ焼き, or 章魚焼き, literally fried or baked octopus
taiyaki
鯛焼き, a Japanese fish-shaped cake, commonly filled with red bean paste that is made from sweetened adzuki beans
tamari
溜まり or たまり, liquid obtained by pressing soybeans
tempura
てんぷら or 天麩羅, classic Japanese deep fried batter-dipped seafood and vegetables. The word may be from Portuguese tempêro/seasoning.
teppanyaki
鉄板焼き, a type of Japanese cuisine that uses a hot iron griddle (teppan) to cook food
teriyaki
照り焼き, translating as 'shiny grill'. a cooking technique where fish or meat is being broiled/grilled with a sweet soy sauce and mirin marinade. The mirin will give the protein a luster, shine.
tofu
豆腐 tōfu bean curd. Although the word is originally Chinese, it entered English via Japanese.
udo
ウド or 独活, an edible plant found on the slopes of wooded embankments, also known as the Japanese Spikenard
udon
うどん or 饂飩, a type of thick wheat-based noodle
umami
旨味 or うま味, the taste sensation produced by some condiments such as monosodium glutamate; a basic flavor in sea weed (昆布 kombu)
umeboshi
梅干, pickled ume
wakame
ワカメ or 若布, a type of edible kelp, often used in miso soup (Japan), and salads
wasabi
わさび or 山葵, a strongly flavoured green condiment also known as Japanese horseradish
yakiniku
焼き肉 or 焼肉 generally denotes grilled meat, but it can also refer to restaurants where raw ingredients are served at the table for diners to cook themselves on a built-in grill.
yakitori
焼き鳥 or 焼鳥, a type of chicken kebab.
yuzu
柚子 or ユズ, a type of citrus fruit hybrid

== Government and politics ==
daimyō
大名 daimyō, "great names"; the most powerful Japanese feudal rulers from the 12th century to the 19th century
genro
元老 genrō, retired elder Japanese statesmen, who served as informal advisors to the emperor, during the Meiji and Taisho eras
mikado
帝, a dated term for "emperor"; specifically for the Emperor of Japan
rōnin
浪人, a samurai without a lord or master
seppuku
切腹, lit. 'cutting [the] belly', also called harakiri (腹切り, lit. 'abdomen/belly cutting', a native Japanese kun reading), is a form of Japanese ritualistic suicide by disembowelment. It was originally reserved for samurai to die within their code of honour, with their honour relating to themselves or their families. It was occasionally used capital punishment for serious offences or shameful activity.
shogun
将軍 shōgun, the title of the practical ruler of Japan for most of the time from 1192 to the Meiji Era
tenno
天皇, a term for the Emperor of Japan

== Martial arts ==
aikido
合気道 aikidō
dojo
道場 dōjō
judo
柔道 jūdō, refers to the Olympic sport.
jujutsu
柔術 jūjutsu, alternately spelt, through mutation, as jiu-jitsu in English.
karate
空手 a fighting style which includes the use of hands and feet to strike the opponent, without any weapon, and is also a popular international sports event. Literally means "empty handed".
kendo
剣道 kendō
sumo
相撲 sumō

== Religion ==
bonze
(from 凡僧 bonsō), a Buddhist monk
koan
公案 kōan, a paradoxical story or statement used during meditation in Zen Buddhism. Inspired the hacker koan tradition among computing circles.
matsuri
祭, is the Japanese word for a festival or holiday.
satori
悟り, enlightenment in Zen Buddhism
shinto
神道 shintō, the native religion of Japan
torii
鳥居, traditional Japanese gates commonly found at the gateway to Shinto shrines
zen
禅, from Chinese 禪 (Mandarin Chán), originally from ध्यान Sanskrit Dhyāna / Pali झान Jhāna, a branch of Mahāyāna Buddhism.

== Other ==
asobi
あそび, a word for the term play
ahegao
アヘ顔, a facial expression in pornographic animation and manga usually depicted when someone is having an orgasm
akita
秋田 (from 秋田犬, akitainu or akitaken), the Akita Inu, a large breed of Japanese dog
baka
(馬鹿, ばか in hiragana, or バカ in katakana) means "fool", "silly", "stupid", or "foolish" and is the most frequently used pejorative term in the Japanese language.
bukkake
ぶっかけ, a sex act portrayed in pornographic films, in which several men ejaculate on a woman, or another man. Note that in Japanese it has a broader meaning of "to pour" or "to splash".
domoic acid
(from ドウモイ doumoi in the Tokunoshima dialect of Japanese: a type of red algae)
emoji
絵文字, ideograms used in electronic messages and webpages.
futon
(from 布団, a flat mattress with a fabric exterior stuffed with cotton, wool, or synthetic batting that makes up a Japanese bed.)
gaijin
外人, lit. outsider/alien is a Japanese word for foreigners and non-Japanese. The word is typically used to refer to foreigners of non-Asian ethnicities.
geisha
芸者, traditional Japanese artist-entertainers
hanahaki disease
花吐き病 lit. "flower vomiting disease" is a fictional disease originating as a trope in manga.
hanami
花見, lit. "flower viewing" is the Japanese traditional custom of enjoying the transient beauty of flowers; flowers (花, hana) in this case almost always refer to those of the cherry (桜, sakura) or, less frequently, plum (梅, ume) trees.
hentai
変態, Western usage: pornographic Anime, usually either Japanese in origin or drawn in a Japanese style; Japanese usage: metamorphosis, transformation, abnormality, or perversion
hikikomori
ひきこもり or 引き籠もり, a psychological condition where the affected individual lives an extremely socially isolated lifestyle by preference, not by default (compare NEET)

honcho
班長 hanchō, head, chief
ikigai
生き甲斐, lit. 'a reason for being'
kamikaze
神風, the literal meaning is "divine wind"; used to refer to a Japanese soldier in World War II who crashed an airplane into a target, committing suicide; also refers to the airplane used in the suicide crash. Can also refer to someone committing a reckless or potentially self-destructive action.
katana
(from かたな literally sword) A Japanese sword that has been forged using traditional Japanese methods. This is referred to as 日本刀 (nihontō) in Japanese.
katsura (tree)
桂, large deciduous trees, native to eastern Asia
kawaii
可愛い, cute and/or lovely. (English IPA: /kəˈwaɪ.i/)
koi
鯉, Western usage: ornamental varieties of the common carp (but in Japan this just means "carp" – the ornamental variety are called "nishikigoi" 錦鯉)
kokoro
こころ, affectionate heart in the context of "spirit", "resolve", "courage", "sentiment", or "the heart of things"
kudzu
(from 葛 or クズ kuzu) A climbing vine found as an invasive species in the southeastern US, which is native to Japan and south-eastern China
moxa
もぐさ or 艾 mogusa, mugwort or cotton wool or other combustible material, burned on skin during moxibustion
moxibustion
(from moxa + (com)bustion), an oriental medicine therapy which involves the burning of moxa (see above)
ninja
Japanese covert agent of the feudal era
puff-puff
ぱふぱふ pafupafu, an onomatopoeic neologism coined by Akira Toriyama to convey a woman's breasts being rubbed in someone's face
rickshaw
(from 人力車 jinrikisha/ninryokusha), a human-pulled wagon
sayonara
左様なら or さようなら sayōnara the Japanese term for "goodbye" (For other uses, see: Sayonara (disambiguation))
samurai
侍 or 士, Japanese knight
sensei
先生, the Japanese term for "master", "teacher" or "doctor". It can be used to refer to any authority figure, such as a schoolteacher, professor, priest, or politician.
senpai
先輩, the Japanese term for "upperclassman" or "senior".
shiatsu
指圧, a form of massage
Shiba Inu
柴犬, the smallest of the six original and distinct Japanese breeds of dog
shinobi
忍び, literally "one who sneaks".
shinro
しんろ, a logic puzzle related to sudoku
skosh
A small amount, from 少し or すこし sukoshi, meaning "a bit" or "a few"
sudoku
数独 sūdoku, a number placement puzzle, also known as Number Place in the United States.
tanuki
狸, the Japanese name for the animal, Nyctereutes procyonoides, known as a Japanese raccoon dog in English
tsunami
津波, literally "harbor wave"; Large wave caused by earthquakes or other underwater disturbances. (English IPA: /ˈ(t)suːnɑːmi/)
urushiol
(from 漆 or うるし urushi, a plant that gives a skin rash on contact) a chemical substance found in poison-ivy, used to make lacquer-ware
zeitaku
ぜいたく, Japanese term for luxury
-zilla
(from ゴジラ Gojira or Godzilla, a fictional creature from Japanese film) a suffix denoting large size or monster-like qualities

== See also ==
- Glossary of anime and manga
- Japanese words of English origin
- Cuisine of Japan
  - Category:Japanese food preparation utensils
- Etiquette in Japan
- Japanese honorifics
- Aizuchi
- Japanese pronouns
