= Saponara (disambiguation) =

Saponara is a commune in Sicily, Italy.

Saponara is also an Italian surname. Notable people with the surname include:

- Fernanda Saponara (born 2001), Peruvian badminton player
- Riccardo Saponara (born 1991), Italian footballer
- Valeria La Saponara (born 1970), Italian mechanical and aerospace engineer

== See also ==
- Sayonara (disambiguation)
