= Baka (Japanese word) =

Pejorative term in the Japanese language

Baka (馬鹿／ばか／バカ; Japanese pronunciation: [baꜜ.ka], transl. idiot; stupid) is a Japanese pejorative. It is cited as the most frequently used pejorative term in the Japanese language.

== Word ==
Baka written in kanji as 馬鹿

The modern Japanese writing system transcribes the insult baka as バカ in katakana, ばか in hiragana, or 馬鹿 (lit. "horse deer") in ateji phonetic kanji transcription; earlier ateji renderings included 莫迦, 母嫁, 馬嫁, or 破家.

=== History ===
The first written usages of baka were during the Nanboku-chō period (1336–1392), when the "Northern and Southern Courts" battled.

In the earliest example, the Taiheiki historical epic records bakamono (馬鹿者) being used as an insult in 1342. The Ashikaga commander Toki Yoritō (土岐頼遠) refused to pay obeisance to retired Emperor Kōgon (r. 1313–1364), "Yoritō, probably inebriated, loudly demands to know what kind of fool (bakamono) has the temerity to order him to dismount." According to Carr, "Shinmura [Izuru] found that the original editions (fourteenth century) of the Taiheiki had baka written バカ; [while] later movable-type editions (c. 1600) had the characters 馬鹿."

A Bunmei-era (1469–1487) edition of the Setsuyōshū dictionary notes baka 馬鹿, which was also written 母嫁 (lit. "mother bride"), 馬嫁 (lit. "horse bride"), or 破家 (lit. "break family"), means rōzeki 狼藉 "disorder; confusion".

Many classical Japanese texts used baka. For instance, the (c. 1616) Kōyō Gunkan military chronicle transcribed baka as 馬嫁. Ihara Saikaku's (1682) Kōshoku Ichidai Otoko (好色一代男; "The Life of an Amorous Man"), which was a classic of the Ukiyozōshi genre, wrote baka with the modern kanji 馬鹿.

=== Etymologies ===
Although the origins of baka are uncertain, Japanese scholars have proposed various etymologies and folk etymologies. The two most widely cited are a Classical Chinese idiom and a loanword from Sanskrit.

First, the oldest hypothesis suggests that baka originated as a Chinese literary "allusion to a historical fool", the Qin dynasty traitor Zhao Gao (d. 207 BCE) from the Records of the Grand Historian. This etymology first appears in the (c. 1548) Unbo Irohashū (運歩色葉集) dictionary, which glosses baka 馬鹿 as meaning "point at a deer and say horse" (指鹿曰馬), namely, the Chinese idiom zhǐlù-wéimǎ (指鹿為馬; lit. "point at a deer and call it a horse", Japanese 鹿を指して馬となす Shika o Sashite Uma to Nasu) meaning "deliberate misrepresentation for ulterior purposes". Zhao was an infamous minister who served the first emperor Qin Shi Huang (r. 246–221 BCE) and forced the second Qin Er Shi (r. 210–207 BCE) to commit suicide.

Zhao Gao was contemplating treason but was afraid the other officials would not heed his commands, so he decided to test them first. He brought a deer and presented it to the Second Emperor but called it a horse. The Second Emperor laughed and said, "Is the chancellor perhaps mistaken, calling a deer a horse?" Then the emperor questioned those around him. Some remained silent, while some, hoping to ingratiate themselves with Zhao Gao, said it was a horse, and others said it was a deer. Zhao Gao secretly arranged for all those who said it was a deer to be brought before the law. Thereafter the officials were all terrified of Zhao Gao.

The Japanese idiom first appears in the 11th-century novel The Tale of Genji.

Kokiden flew into a rage. "A man out of favor with His Majesty is expected to have trouble feeding himself. And here he is living in a fine stylish house and saying awful things about all of us. No doubt the grovelers around him are assuring him that a deer is a horse."

Second, the most linguistically sound etymology is that baka derives from a Sanskrit word meaning "fool". According to the Japanese linguist and lexicographer Shinmura Izuru, the Edo-period scholar Amano Sadakage (天野信景; 1663–1733) originally suggested that Japanese Buddhist priests coined the word baka from Sanskrit. Modern reference works give two possible Sanskrit sources for the word, moha (transcribed 慕何) "foolish" and mahallaka (摩訶羅) "stupid". Sanskrit moha (मोह) means "bewilderment, loss of consciousness, delusion, folly" and comes from the root muh meaning "bewildered, perplexed, confused". Sanskrit mahallaka means "senile, feeble minded, stupid, decrepit" and comes from mūrkha (मूर्ख), meaning "dull, stupid, foolish, inexperienced; fool".

Other proposed etymologies for baka are less reliable. Two Edo-period dictionaries proposed that baka derived from: ōmaka 大まか "generous; unsparing" (Rigen Shūran 俚言集覧) or bokeru 惚ける "grow senile; dote; become feeble-minded" (Matsuya Hikki 松屋筆記).

=== Related words ===
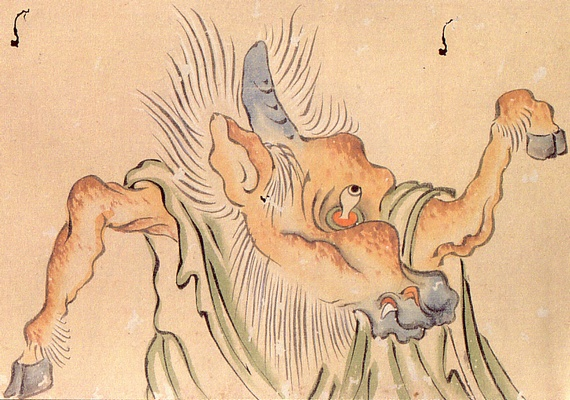
Mumashika depiction from the 1832 Hyakki Yagyō Emaki

The same 馬鹿 "horse deer" characters that transcribe baka are also used for names in Chinese zoological nomenclature and Japanese mythology.

In Chinese, mǎlù (馬鹿) refers to the red deer (Cervus elaphus), Japanese akashika 赤鹿.

Mumashika is a rare alternate Japanese reading of 馬鹿 that names a yōkai demon with a horse's head and deer's body. The c. 1832 Hyakki Yagyō Emaki (百鬼夜行絵巻; "Hyakki Yagyō emakimono") depicts it with one eye, a horse's mouth and ears, and deer horn and hooves.

=== Meanings ===
Based on semantic analyses of baka entries in Japanese dictionaries and thesauruses, the lexicographer Michael Carr differentiates eight interrelated meanings.

Three basic "fool; foolish" meanings distinguish baka^{1} "ass; jerk; fool", baka^{2} "ament; idiot; imbecile; fool" (ament is a rare word for "congenitally mentally deficient"), and baka^{3} "blockhead; dullard; dimwit; simpleton; dolt; fool". These are found in many frequently used Japanese expressions. Some more insulting lexemes are bakamono 馬鹿者 "stupid, fool, idiot", ōbaka 大馬鹿 "big fool damned idiot", and baka-yarō 馬鹿野郎 "stupid jerk, ass, asshole, dumbass". Some compounds are baka yoke 馬鹿ヨケ "foolproof; idiot-proof", baka warai 馬鹿笑い "foolish/horse laugh" and baka zura 馬鹿面 "foolish face; stupid look"; and some verb phrases are baka ni suru 馬鹿にする "make a fool of (someone); treat with contempt", baka yobawarisuru 馬鹿よばわりする "call (someone) a fool", and baka o miru 馬鹿を見る "make a fool/ass of (oneself)".

Two extended meanings of baka^{4} "worthless" and baka^{5} "excess" expand upon "folly; foolishness". Baka^{4} "worthless; foolish; valueless; trifling; insignificant" is used in expressions such as bakageta 馬鹿げた "foolish; absurd; ridiculous"; bakana 馬鹿な "foolish; silly; stupid"; and bakarashii 馬鹿らしい, bakabakarashii 馬鹿々々らしい, or bakakusai 馬鹿臭い, all meaning "foolish; absurd; ridiculous". It is further used in phrases like baka ie 馬鹿言え "Nonsense!; Go on!", and bakana mane o suru 馬鹿な真似をする "do a foolish thing; act foolishly". Baka^{5} "excess; foolish; absurd; extreme; extravagant" is found in a number of expressions: bakani 馬鹿に or bakabakashiku 馬鹿々々しく "awfully; terribly; extremely"; bakayasui 馬鹿安い "ridiculously/dirt cheap"; bakane 馬鹿値 or bakadakai 馬鹿高い "ridiculously expensive"; bakateinei 馬鹿丁寧 "excessive politeness"; and bakashōjiki 馬鹿正直 "honest to a fault".

Three special meanings are unrelated semantic connections. Baka^{6} "trough shell" is a truncation of bakagai 馬鹿貝 "trough shell; Mactra chinensis". Baka^{7} "numbness (of limbs)" is used in the expression baka ni naru 馬鹿になる, and baka^{8} means "(an antique kind of) coin counter".

== Usages ==
In Japanese in MangaLand: Learning the Basics, Marc Bernabe listed baka as "the most commonly used" and the "top swearword" in Japan. Usages of this term can be discussed in terms of pragmatic depth, dialectal variation, and proper names.

=== Pragmatics ===
The linguistic pragmatics of using insults like baka can be language specific. For instance, Japanese has fewer words for calling someone a "fool" than English. Jack Seward recounts asking his language teacher "to prepare a list of the most stunning and forcible insults, pejoratives, and curses in Japanese", but was surprised that the "short, unimaginative, and seeming ineffectual" list had only two words: baka "fool" and chikushō 畜生 "beast".

Carr proposes that intentional vagueness explains the comparatively small lexical field of Japanese insults.

One likely reason for the relatively few Japanese words for 'fool' is vagueness. In both English and Japanese, the words for 'fool' have meanings that vary along scales of friendly–hostile, or joking–serious. In English, at one end of a scale are words like silly goose and at the other end are words like stupid asshole. And in Japanese, at one end are words like kamaboko baka 蒲鉾馬鹿 'silly chump' and at the other end are words like baka-yarō 馬鹿野郎 'damn fool'. The difference is in the degree of lexical diversification along the scales of meaning. English seems to have more 'fool' words with more specificity – Japanese seems to have fewer 'fool' words with more vagueness. There are decided pragmatic and communicative advantages to such lexical vagueness. If you call me a stupid son-of-a-bitch, I know exactly what you mean. But if you call me a baka-yarō, I cannot be so sure of what you mean. The expression baka-yarō 馬鹿野郎 is one of the most insulting terms in the Japanese lexicon, but it is vague and can range in meaning from an affectionate 'silly-willy' to an abusive 'jerk-off fool'. Baka-yarō is so widely used that it has become semantically weak and vague. Such vagueness can serve to conceal hostility and thus to maintain social harmony.

=== Dialectal ===
According to Marc Bernabe, Japanese dialects show regional variations between using baka in Kantō dialect and aho 阿呆 or あほ "fool; idiot; jackass" in Kansai dialect. In addition, the insult aho has more of a slang connotation than baka. Many Japanese dictionaries treat the words baka and aho as synonyms. "However, in Osaka and its surroundings, aho is a rather non-offensive word, whereas baka is an explosive word." Nevertheless, "In Tokyo and its surroundings, we find exactly the opposite, so you must be careful with the usage of these words."

=== Proper names ===
Baka frequently occurs in proper nouns. Examples from Japanese pop music include albums (Pretty Little Baka Guy, Ai no Baka "Love Fool") and songs ("Suki Sugite Baka Mitai" "To Like [Him] Too Much and Look Like a Fool"). Some titles from modern Japanese literature are Tsuribaka Nisshi ("Fishing Fool's Diary"), Inubaka: Crazy for Dogs ("Dog Fool"), Karate Baka Ichidai ("A Karate-Crazy Life"), and Baka to Test to Shōkanjū ("Idiots, Tests, and Summoned Creatures").

=== English ===
During World War II, baka was American military slang for the Imperial Japanese Yokosuka MXY-7 Ohka kamikaze flying bomb. The earliest recorded usage was in Newsweek on May 7, 1945, "American forces have officially designated this bomb as 'baka', baka being Japanese for foolish, silly, or stupid."

English-speaking weebs have been known to use baka in its Japanese context as a loanword.

== In popular culture ==
In the Tamil film Japanil Kalyanaraman (1985), the Japan-based tourist guide Munusamy (Chitra Lakshmanan) misleads Mayilsamy (Goundamani) by claiming that baka is Japanese for Greetings. The latter repeats the word to a Japanese woman who then slaps him.

== See also ==
- Japanese profanity
