= Taikun =

Japanese title for the shogun

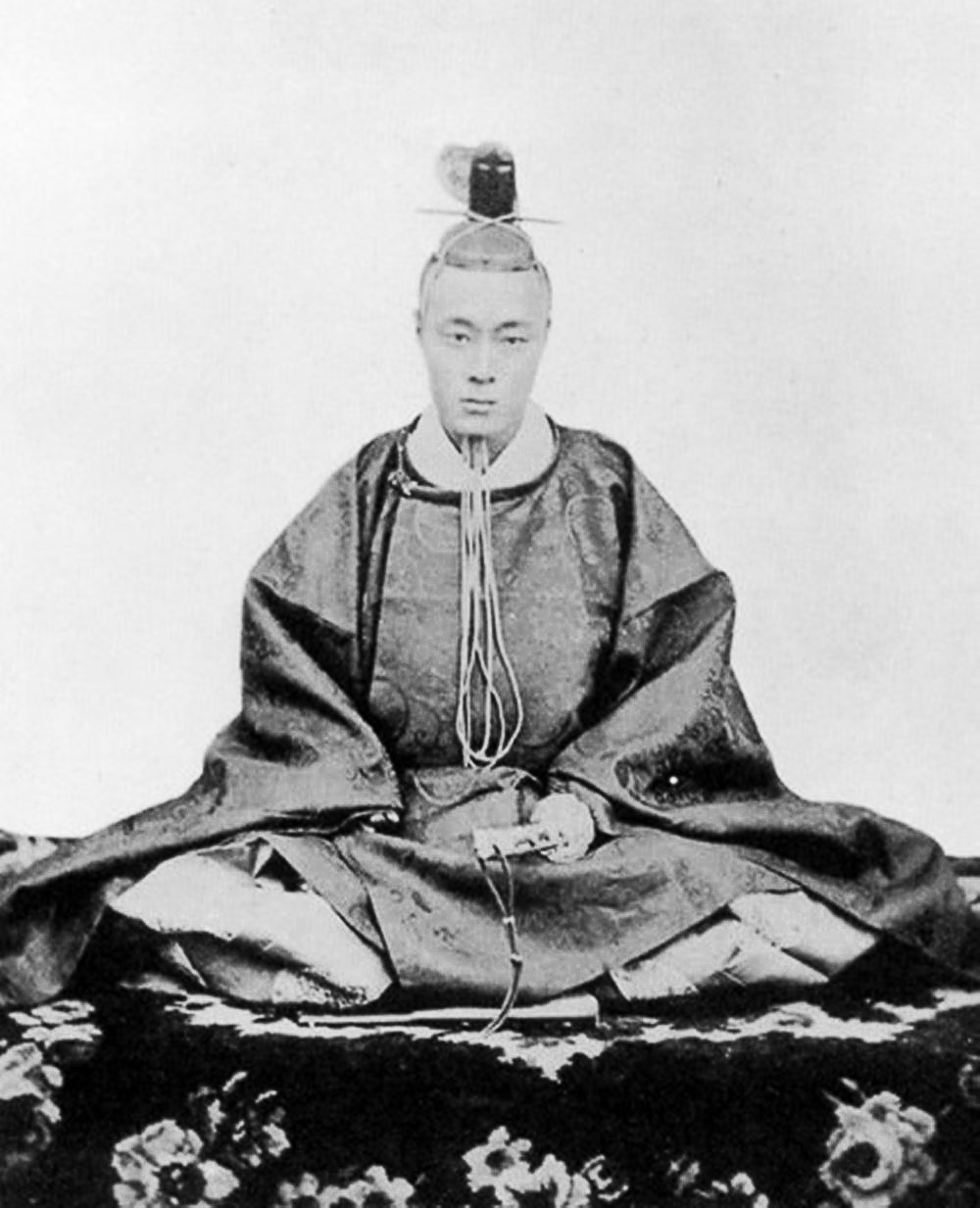
Tokugawa Yoshinobu, the last taikun

Taikun (大君), spelled tycoon in English language sources from the 1860s, is an archaic Japanese term of respect. Its literal meaning is "Great Lord/Prince" or "Supreme Commander". In official documents, it was written Nihon-koku Taikun (日本国大君, Tycoon of Japan).

The term originally derived from the Chinese text I Ching; in China it referred to an independent ruler who was not part of the imperial lineage. Empress Kōgyoku (皇極天皇, Kōgyoku-tennō; 594–661 AD) of Japan and unspecified predecessors are reported to have used the title 大和大君, "Yamato Taikun".

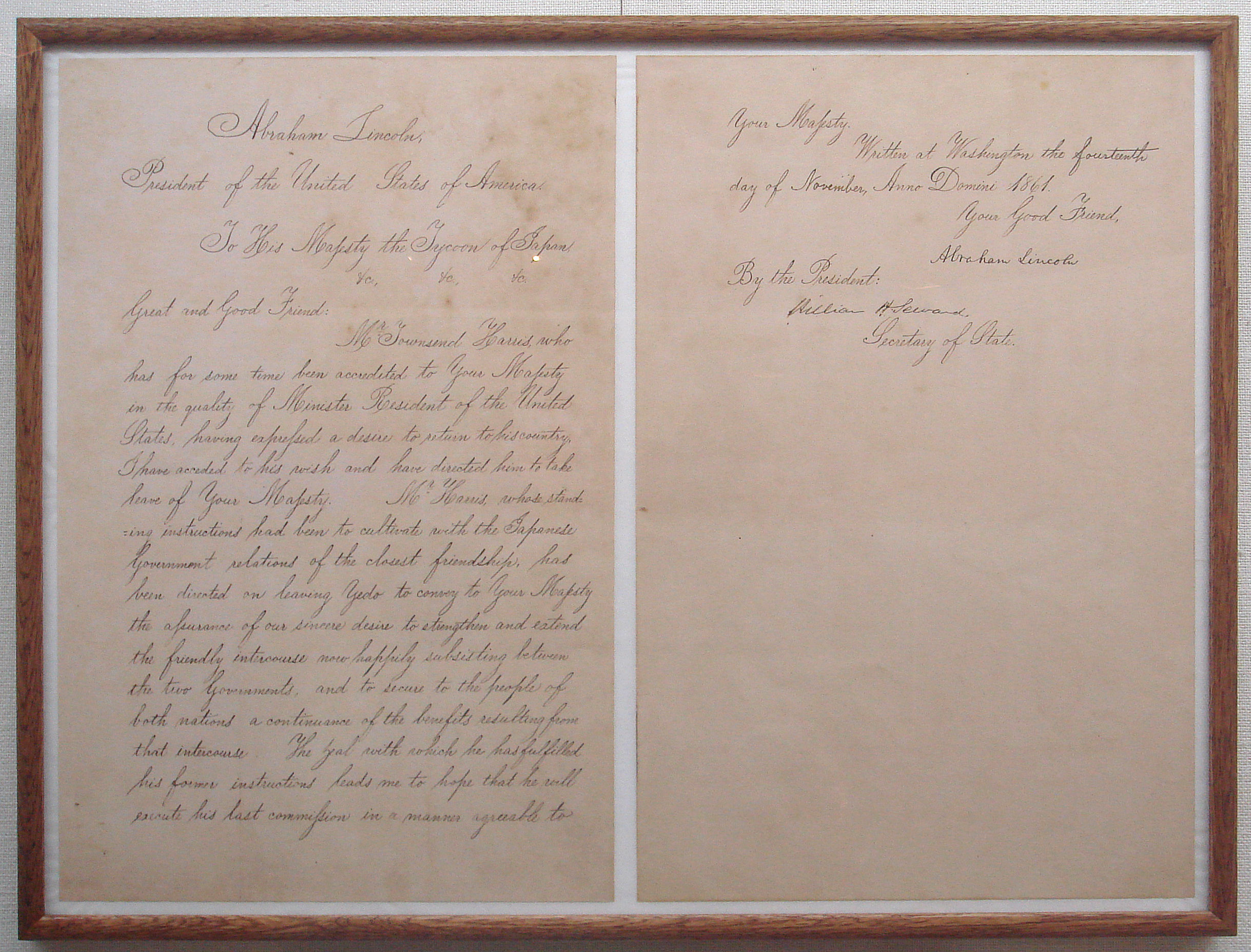
Diplomatic letter from Abraham Lincoln to the "Tycoon of Japan" (then Tokugawa Iemochi), announcing the end of Townsend Harris' service as US consul to Japan. 14 November 1861.

During Japan's Edo period, in relations with foreign countries the term taikun was used as a diplomatic title designating the shōgun of Japan. This was an attempt to convey that foreign relations were the responsibility of the shōgun, not the Emperor of Japan. The term was first used for foreign relations by the Tokugawa shogunate, in an attempt to extricate Japan from the Sino-centric system of international relations, which required diplomacy to follow the concept of emperor at home, king abroad. In diplomatic correspondence, the shōgun could not refer to himself as the tennō (天皇, emperor), but he also could not use the term kokuō (国王, king). Because formal language is extremely important in diplomacy, the connotations of most alternative terms were found to be inappropriate, so taikun was chosen to best represent the shōgun in formal diplomatic communications.

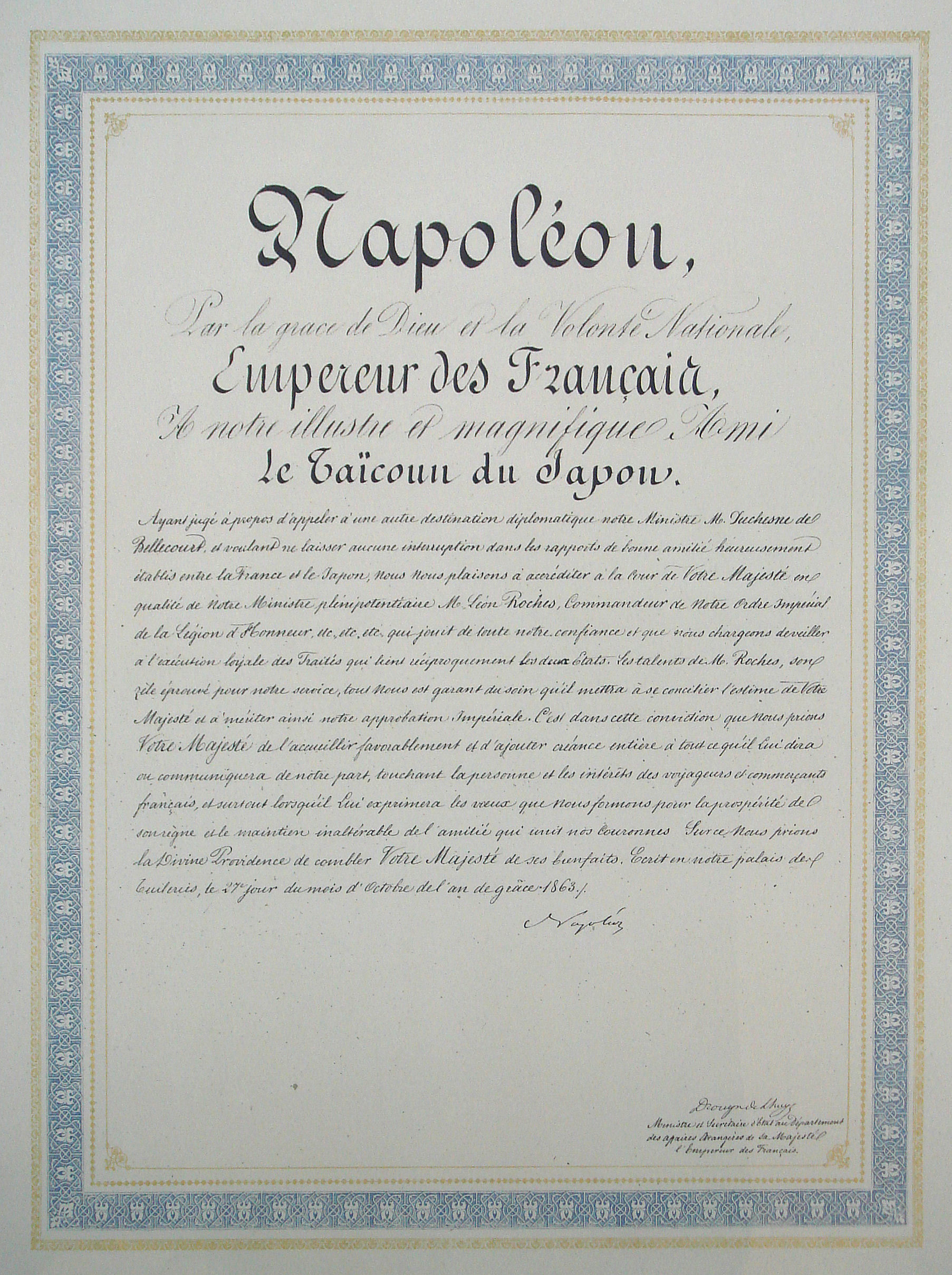
Letter of credence from Napoleon III to the "Le Taïcoun du Japon", appointing Léon Roches to replace Duchesne de Bellecourt as French consul to Japan, 23 October 1863.

The word has entered the English language as tycoon, where it has assumed the meaning of "a person of great wealth, influence or power". The term is notable as a Japanese word in English that comes from a different meaning in Japanese culture. A "tycoon" is a person of great influence without formal title, whereas a "taikun" was a ruler without imperial lineage.

== See also ==
- Taikō (太閤)
