= Japanese profanity =

Profanity in Japanese

Profanity in the Japanese language can pertain to scatological references or aim to put down the listener by negatively commenting on their ability, intellect, or appearance. Furthermore, there are different levels of Japanese speech that indicate politeness, social standing and respect, referred to, simply, as honorific form (敬語 keigo). Using the incorrect form of Japanese can itself be insulting to the listener.

== Language-based profanity ==
In Japanese culture, social hierarchy plays a significant role in the way someone speaks to the various people they interact with on a day-to-day basis. Choice on level of speech, politeness, body language and appropriate content is assessed on a situational basis, and intentional misuse of these social cues can be offensive to the listener in conversation.

=== Pronouns and suffixes ===
Pronouns are rarely used in Japanese compared to English. Rather, a Japanese speaker would refer to another individual, whether it be in the second person or third person, by their family name. The use of suffixes on names can indicate levels of politeness when referring to an individual.

For example, in English one might say, "Excuse me, Ms. Ishiyama, but I cannot hear you. Could you please speak louder?" The following would be a literal translation:

(1) 石山先生、すみませんが、私はあなたが聞こえません。あなたはもっと大きい声で話してくれませんか？ (Ishiyama-sensei, sumimasen ga watashi wa anata ga kikoemasen. Anata wa motto ōkii koe de hanashitekuremasen ka?)

Example (1) would come across as disrespectful in Japanese because Japanese exhibits pronoun avoidance, which is when the usage of pronouns to refer to others is seen as too direct, and is in turn considered offensive or strange. Instead of using pronouns for oneself, 私 (watashi, 'I'), or for another, あなた (anata, 'you'), a speaker would omit pronouns for themselves, and call the other person by name:

(2) 石山先生、すみませんが、聞こえません。もっと大きい声で話してくれませんか？ (Ishiyama-sensei, sumimasen ga, kikoemasen. Motto ōkii koe de hanashitekuremasen ka?)

The use of Ms. Ishiyama's (石山) family name instead of her first name, and the use of 'teacher' (先生, sensei) as a suffix, indicates recognition of Ms. Ishiyama's superiority in the social hierarchy as the speaker's teacher.

In contrast, if one were to say example (1) without 'Ishiyama-sensei' (石山先生), it would be considered impolite because Ms. Ishiyama's superior status is not mentioned, indicating that the speaker considers themselves to be of equal or higher social standing. Even in the case that her name with a suffix were mentioned, it would still be more impolite than omitting the pronouns due to pronoun avoidance.

=== Honorific language ===
Profanity can be accentuated also through use (or lack) of honorific language (敬語 けいご keigo). To say example (1) in a less polite way, a speaker could exchange the word for 'excuse me/sorry' (すみません sumimasen) for ごめん gomen, and contract the words for 'I cannot hear you' (聞こえません kikoemasen) to 聞こえない kikoenai and 'can you speak' (話してくれませんか hanashitekuremasenka) to 言って itte.

Politeness can be conveyed to the listener by conjugating plain forms (verb stems) of Japanese verbs into what is called the polite form. Consider the original example. The plain form verb for 'listen' is 聞く kiku. The potential form of this is 聞こえる kikoeru, and the corresponding negative form is 聞こえない kikoenai. The polite conjugation of the negative potential plain form is then 聞こえません kikoemasen, as seen in the example (1). If the speaker chose to use the plain form 聞こえない kikoenai, this would indicate a further disregard for the social hierarchical status of Ms. Ishiyama from the speaker.

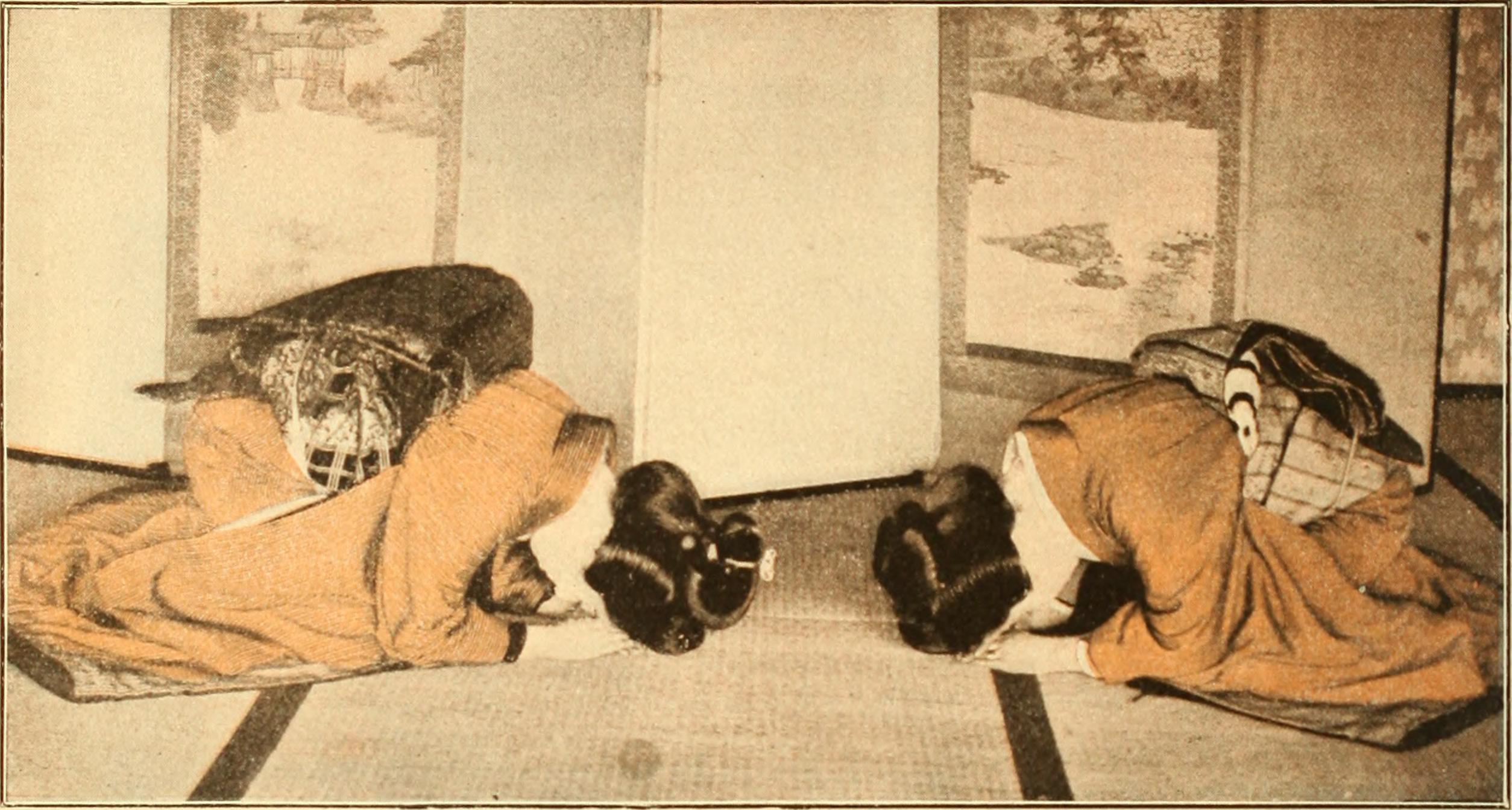
Japanese women dressed in kimono bowing to each other in formal greeting in a tatami room

=== Bowing ===
Bowing was introduced into Japanese culture c. 500–800 CE, possibly alongside the introduction of Chinese Buddhism into the country. Bowing when greeting another person has become a large part of Japanese culture and there are specific customs that are followed to show humility and respect in situations including business meetings, formal occasions, and day-to-day interactions. When performing a standing bow (正立 seiritsu) to another Japanese speaker, the individual's back should remain straight, with their hands by their side, and eyes averted to the ground. From sitting, the individual should be seated on their knees (正座 seiza) with their hands forming a triangle on the floor in front of them, and head moving towards the hands. The bow does not need to be held for extended time, however the action should not be rushed either. The speed in which the bow is performed, as a result, can infer levels of politeness or rudeness.

The depth of the bow performed by an individual changes the meaning of the bow. A bow of 15 degrees is considered a casual bow or greeting bow (会釈 eshaku). This sort of bow can be used with someone of equal social hierarchical status such as a colleague or friend's friend. A bow of 30 degrees is considered a polite bow (浅礼 senrei) and should be made from a seiza position, not as a seiritsu standing bow. This sort of bow is used in semi-formal situations. A bow of 45 degrees is a respectful bow (敬礼 keirei) and can be done while seated or standing. The respectful bow is used when greeting a superior such as an employer, or in-laws. Finally, a deep bow of greater than 45 degrees is called a reverent bow (最敬礼 saikeirei) and this is reserved either for an audience with the emperor or to communicate a deep reverence or regret.

With regards to profanity, using an overly polite or reverent form of bowing can display sarcasm and disdain, and conversely, choosing an inappropriately familial bow can be offensive to the other party.

== Vocabulary ==
The Japanese media industry self-censors by adopting the Hōsō kinshi yōgo (放送禁止用語), a list of words prohibited from broadcasting. Not all words on the list are profanities, and the list has been accused of excessively limiting freedom of speech by bowing to political correctness (in Japanese, kotobagari). For example, the name of professional wrestler Bobo Brazil has at times been censored because bobo (ボボ), an obscure dialectal term for 'vagina', is on the list.

=== Sex ===
Similar to English, profanities that relate to the body tend to refer to the direct words for body parts and may not necessarily be negative words.

Masculine profanities

- くそじじい kusojijii – old fart, old hag (unpleasant old man)
- インポ inpo – impotent
- ちんぽこ chinpoko – dick, penis, prick
- ちんちん chinchin – pre-pubescent penis, willy (silly slang for "penis")
- ちんぽ chinpo – penis
- ぽこちん pokochin – penis
- まら mara – penis

Feminine profanities

- あばずれ abazure – bitch
- やりまん yariman – slut
- くそばばあ kusobabaa – old fart, old hag (unpleasant old woman)
- まんこ manko – vagina, cunt
- おまんこ omanko – vagina, screw, vaginal intercourse
- われめ wareme – slit, vagina, cunt
- われめちゃん waremechan – slit, vagina, cunt (same as wareme with the cutesy suffix 'chan')
- おめこ omeko – vagina; vaginal intercourse

Neutral profanities

- 変態 (へんたい) hentai – perverted, pervert
- スケベ sukebe – lech, lecher
- いやらしい iyarashii – disgusting, lewd, indecent
- 下衆野郎 (げすやろう) gesuyarou – asshole

=== Insults ===
==== Common Japanese insults ====
- ざけんな zakenna (short form of ふざけるな) – bullshit, don't mess with me
- くたばれ kutabare – drop dead, fuck you
- しんじまえ shinjimae – die, go to hell
- くそくらえ kuso kurae – eat shit
- くそったれ kusottare – (literally) shit-drip
- きさま (貴様) kisama – rude pronoun 'you'
- てめえ temee – rude pronoun 'you', slurred version of the below
- 手前 (てまえ) temae – rude pronoun 'you'
- こいつ、あいつ koitsu, aitsu – rude, overly familiar expression for a third party
- この野郎 (このやろう) kono yaroo – you bastard (generally directed at men)
- やつ, やつめ yatsu, yatsume – unpleasant, disliked person
- ちくしょう (畜生) chikushoo – oh shit, damn it, oh hell
- やかましい, じゃかまし~ yakamashii, jakamashi~ – shut up
- うるさい, うざい urusai – shut up (literally: 'noisy, annoying')
- 最低 (さいてい) saitei – the worst, disgusting
- め me – suffix that implies contempt
- 屁こき (へこき) hekoki – farter

==== Stupidity ====
- あほ (アホ) aho – idiot, moron, fool, asshole
- 馬鹿 (ばか) baka – idiot, moron, fool, asshole
- ぱく paku – clueless, loser, train obsessed, lacking skill
- 馬鹿野郎 (ばかやろう) baka yaroo – idiot, moron, fool, asshole
- まぬけ manuke – clueless, loser (literally 'missing a beat', 'out of rhythm')
- のろま noroma – slowpoke, twit, daft
- へたくそ hetakuso – clumsy, lacking skill
- どじ doji – clumsy, clueless
- ぼけ boke – clueless, unaware, dumb, stupid
- とろい toroi – slow-witted, doesn't get it
- ガイジ gaiji – retard

==== Personality/people ====
- くそがき kusogaki – bad-mannered child, brat
- わるがき warugaki – brat
- でぶ debu – fatso, fatty
- ぶす busu – ugly
- ちび chibi – runt, shorty
- くちきたない kuchikitanai – bad mouthed, bitchy
- けち kechi – stingy, mean
- ずるい zurui – selfish, unfair
- ダサい/ださい dasai – unfashionable, lame
- くそまじめ kusomajime – overly serious, 'goody-two-shoes'
- ヲタク otaku – creepily obsessive (usually for computer or pop-culture geeks, also used to describe oneself as a hardcore fan of anime, games and manga)
- 意地悪 (いじわる) ijiwaru – malicious, spiteful, bitchy
- やぼ yabo – coarse, impolite, disrespectful
- 弱虫 (よわむし) yowamushi – weak, cowardly (literally 'weak insect')
- ノズ nozu (an insult originating from Hiroshima, comes from the English word 'noise' ノイズ) – noisy, creep, unpredictable person, weird
- 腰抜け (こしぬけ) koshinuke – coward
- 嘘つき (うそつき) usotsuki – liar
- きもい kimoi (short for 気持ち悪い, kimochi warui) – disgusting, gross
- うざい/うぜえ uzai/uzē (short for うるさい, urusai) – annoying, noisy
- 障害者 (しょうがいしゃ) shougaisha – disabled person

=== Racial euphemisms ===
Japan has managed to preserve its culture, which was highly influenced by Chinese culture, through isolation from other countries. Prior to the World Wars, Japan had unstable relationships with the nations surrounding them, including Korea and China. Following the World Wars, Japanese civilization experienced exposure to Western culture, and this resulted in a range of insults with regards to nationality, race, and place of origin.

- 異人 (いじん) ijin – foreigner, another person
- ミンリン ming ling/ minrin – Chinese person who lacks patriotism, hatred for own country, obsessed with game developing
- 異邦人 (いほうじん) ihoojin – foreigner, stranger
- 毛唐 (けとう) ketoo – foreigner, alien, newcomer, stranger, non-native
- 他国人 (たこくじん) takokujin – foreigner, stranger, alien
- 黒んぼ (くろんぼ) kuronbo – black person, darkie
- 外人 (がいじん) gaijin – foreigner (literally 'outsider')
- 害人 (がいじん) gaijin – derogatory way of writing foreigner (it is pronounced the same way as the non derogatory way but using the character for harm instead of the one for outside, literally 'harmful person')
- チョン chon – Korean person
- キムチ野郎 (きむちやろう) kimuchiyaroo – Korean person (literally 'Kimchi fellow')
- 特亜人 (とくあじん) tokuajin – abbreviation of 'Tokutei Asian'. A term used to describe those from countries with strong anti-Japanese sentiment, specifically Koreans and Chinese.
- 三国人 (さんごくじん) sangokujin - lit. 'third-country person', referring to Koreans and Taiwanese in Japan, particularly those after WW2

=== Homosexuality ===
- お釜 (おかま) okama – (literally) pot, slang for gay man, especially refers to cross-dressers
- お鍋 (おなべ) onabe – (literally) pot, slang for gay woman/lesbian
- レズ rezu – lesbian
- ホモ homo – homosexual
