= Jack Seward =

American expert on Japan (1924–2010)

- Born: John Neil Seward Jr. October 11, 1924; Houston, Texas, United States
- Died: November 10, 2010 (aged 86); Houston, Texas, United States
- Occupations: WWII veteran, author of 45 books in Japanese and English, teacher, lecturer, businessman
- Spouse(s): Aiko (Jean) Morimoto, 2 children
- Military career
- Allegiance: United States of America
- Branch: U.S. Army Central Intelligence Agency CIA
- Service years: 1941–?
- Conflicts: World War II

John Neil Seward Jr. (October 11, 1924 – November 10, 2010) was a World War II veteran who was assigned to military intelligence in 1941 because of his knowledge of Japanese at a time when very few Americans knew the language. Following the war, Seward continued his intelligence work in Japan, during Allied occupation. After his time in the military and, later on, in the CIA, he worked with a number of companies and became a prolific writer. Some of his 45 books, in Japanese and English, are still used today. He was awarded the Order of the Sacred Treasure in 1986 for his efforts to spread knowledge of Japanese culture and language.

== Honors and tributes ==
Order of the Sacred Treasure, 1986
