= Valeria La Saponara =

Italian-American mechanical engineer

Valeria La Saponara (born 1970) is an Italian-American mechanical and aerospace engineer whose research studies mycelium-based materials and the durability of biodegradable fiber-reinforced composite materials, particularly for applications in aerospace and in wind energy. She is a professor in the Department of Mechanical and Aerospace Engineering at the University of California, Davis.

== Education and career ==
La Saponara earned a Bachelor of Science degree in 1994 in aerospace engineering from the University of Naples Federico II. After continued work at the MARS Center, an aerospace contractor in Naples. She laster completed a Master of Science and a Ph. D. and a 2021 in aerospace engineering at the Georgia Institute of Technology.

Following her doctoral studies, La Saponara held academic appointments in mechanical engineering, including a faculty position at the University of Utah. In 2005, she joined the University of California, Davis, where she held appointments as assistant professor, associate professor, and professor.

== Research ==
La Saponara's research centers on the applied mechanics of composite materials, with particular emphasis on fiber-reinforced polymer composites, material degradation, and structural performance. Her work also includes studies of smart composite systems and advanced materials.

== Recognition ==
La Saponara received several academic and research awards, including a National Space Foundation CAREER Award. She was also recognized through fellowships, including being a ASME Fellow in 2018.
