= Shinro =

Logic puzzle

A Shinro puzzle in its initial state...

...and with the hidden Holes displayed.

Shinro (しんろ) is a logic-based puzzle that has similarities to Sudoku and Minesweeper. The objective is to locate 12 hidden 'Holes' on an 8×8 grid. The board contains a variable number of arrows, each of which points to at least one Hole. A count of the number of Holes is given for each Row and Column.

Originally appearing in Japanese puzzle magazines, Shinro was popularized by its appearance in Southwest Airline's Spirit Magazine. It has since spawned web-based and iPhone versions.

== Name ==
New York-based puzzle-writing company Puzzability has been credited with coining the name Shinro in 2007. The name Shinro (しんろ) translates to "compass bearing", referring to the arrows that point towards the Holes.

== Availability ==
Websites:

- Southwest Airlines Spirit Magazine, Fun and Games section Downloadable PDF with four puzzles
- Sternenhimmel (Babelfish translation) German variation where each arrow points to only one Hole
- Evolutionary Algorithm for Generation of Entertaining Shinro Logic Puzzles by David Oranchak
- Online Shinro games

iPhone:

- Shinro Mines
- Jabeh with video tutorial
- Sudoku Shinro

Android:

- Shinro: Minefield

== See also ==
- Logic puzzle
