= Sayonara (disambiguation) =

Sayonara (さようなら) a Japanese word meaning 'goodbye'; it is sometimes used in English.

Sayonara may also refer to:

- Sayonara (fish), a genus of perchlet fish from the Western Pacific

== Fiction ==
- Sayonara (1957 film), an American film starring Marlon Brando
- Sayonara (novel), a 1954 novel by James A. Michener, adapted into the 1957 film
- Sayonara (2015 film), a Japanese film by Kōji Fukada
- "Sayonara" (The Jeffersons), a 1985 two-part television episode
- "Sayonara" (Slow Horses), a 2026 television episode

== Music ==
- Sayonara (album), by Die Flippers, or the title song, 1994
- "Sayonara", a 2006 song by Orange Range
- "Sayonara", a song by James from Wah Wah, 1994
- "Sayonara", a song by Mary MacGregor from the film Adieu Galaxy Express 999, 1981
- "Sayonara", a song by Miranda Cosgrove from High Maintenance, 2011
- "Sayonara", a song by Off Course, 1979
- "Sayonara", a song by the Pogues from Hell's Ditch, 1990
- "Sayonara", a song by Red Velvet from Sappy, 2019
- "Sayonara", a song by A Taste of Honey, 1982
- "Sayonara", a song written by Irving Berlin and featured in the eponymous film, 1957
- "Sayonara", a song from the 1973 Indian film Ulagam Sutrum Valiban

== Ships ==
- Sayonara, a yacht that competed in the 1998 Sydney to Hobart Yacht Race
- USS Sayonara II (SP-587), a US Navy patrol boat 1917–1919
