= Spelling pronunciation =

Pronunciation of a word influenced by its spelling

A spelling pronunciation is the pronunciation of a word according to its spelling rather than its standard or traditional pronunciation. Words that are spelled with letters that were never pronounced or that were not pronounced for many generations have increasingly been pronounced as written, especially since the arrival of mandatory schooling and universal literacy.

If a word's spelling was standardized prior to sound changes that produced its traditional pronunciation, a spelling pronunciation may reflect an older pronunciation. This is often the case with compound words (e.g., waistcoat, cupboard, forehead) and for many words with silent letters (e.g. often). Sometimes silent letters do not reflect older English pronunciations, but were added to reflect a word's spelling in its language of origin (e.g. victual, rhyming with little but derived from Late Latin victualia) or on the basis of erroneous etymologies (island, scythe).

Spelling pronunciations are often prescriptively discouraged and perceived as incorrect next to the traditionally accepted, and usually more widespread, pronunciation. If a spelling pronunciation persists and becomes more common, it may eventually join the existing form as a standard variant (for example waistcoat and often), or even become the dominant pronunciation (as with forehead and falcon).

== Prevalence and causes ==
Many spelling pronunciations occur in languages with historical orthography, such as French and English, although most languages have some non-phonemic spellings.. This is especially true for people who are only taught to read and write and who are not taught when the spelling indicates an outdated (or etymologically incorrect) pronunciation. In other words, when many people do not clearly understand where spelling came from and what it is (a tool for recording speech, not the other way around), spelling pronunciations are common.

On the other hand, spelling pronunciations are also evidence of the reciprocal effects of spoken and written language on each other. Many spellings represent older forms and corresponding older pronunciations. Some spellings, however, are not etymologically correct.

Speakers often privilege spelling pronunciations. Pronunciations can then arise that are similar to older pronunciations or that can even be completely new pronunciations that are suggested by the spelling but never occurred before.

== English examples ==
- kiln with a fully pronounced n, instead of a silent n. Kiln was originally pronounced kil with the n silent, as documented in Webster's Dictionary of 1828. From English Words as Spoken and Written for Upper Grades by James A. Bowen 1900: "The digraph ln, n silent, occurs in kiln. A fall down the kiln can kill you."
- often, pronounced with /t/. This is a reversion to the 15th-century pronunciation, but the pronunciation without /t/ is still preferred by 73% of British speakers and 78% of American speakers. Older dictionaries do not list the pronunciation with /t/ although the 2nd edition of the OED does (and the first edition notes the pronunciation with the comment that it is prevalent in the south of England and often used in singing; see the Dictionary of American Regional English for contemporaneous citations that discuss the status of the competing pronunciations). The sporadic nature of such shifts is apparent upon examination of examples such as whistle, listen and soften in which the t remains usually silent.
- forehead once rhymed with horrid but is now pronounced with the second syllable as /hɛd/ by 85% of American speakers and 65% of British speakers. This is a reversion to the original pronunciation.
- clothes was historically pronounced the same way as the verb close ("Whenas in silks my Julia goes/.../The liquefaction of her clothes"—Herrick), but many speakers now insert a /ð/, a voiced th. This is a reversion to the 15th-century pronunciation.
- salmon is pronounced by a minority of English speakers with /l/, due to the letter l being re-introduced, despite being neither written nor pronounced in the original Anglo-French pronunciation.
- The modern British pronunciation of solder is usually /ˈsoʊldər/, but the North American pronunciation of solder is usually /ˈsɒdər/ with a silent ⟨l⟩. The word solder is derived from the old French souder, and the ⟨l⟩ was re-introduced in the 1500s on etymological grounds with the Latin solidāre. Even though the pronunciation without the /l/ was the traditional way to pronounce it in Britain, the spelling pronunciation with the /l/ eventually became the standard there.
- falcon is now nearly always pronounced with /l/, and only 3% of speakers have no /l/. The /l/ was silent in the old pronunciation: compare French faucon and the older English spellings faucon and fawcon. That may suggest either analogical change or the reborrowing of the original Latin.
- alms, balm, calm, psalm, etc. are now often pronounced with /l/ in some parts of the United States. In most of the United Kingdom, the traditional /ɑːm/ pronunciation continues to prevail.
- comptroller is often pronounced with /mp/; the accepted pronunciation is controller (the mp spelling is based on the mistaken idea that the word is related to comp(u)tare "count, compute," but it comes from contre-roll "file copy").
- ye (actually, yͤ or Þe), the definite article, as in Ye Olde Coffee Shoppe, is often pronounced like the archaic English pronoun ye instead of as the word the, based on the misleading use of the symbol y to substitute for the archaic printer's mark Þ: the letter thorn. (On the other hand, the beginning of the pronoun ye in Middle and Early Modern English is correctly pronounced like the beginning of you.)
- Mackenzie, Menzies, Dalziel now include the sound /z/ in place of the original /j/, due to the insular flat-topped g of Gaelic scripts being commonly transcribed into English as the similar-looking letter z.
- victuals, pronounced /ˈvɪtəlz/ (rhyming with skittles), whose c (for a consonant that had been lost long before the word was borrowed from French) was re-introduced on etymological grounds, is sometimes pronounced with /kt/. The original pronunciation is reflected in, for example, the cat food brand "Tender Vittles".
- The pronunciation of waistcoat as waist-coat is now more common than the previous pronunciation /ˈwɛskət/.
- conduit, historically pronounced /ˈkɒndɪt/ or /ˈkʌn-/, is now nearly always pronounced /ˈkɒndjuɪt/ in most of the United States.
- covert, historically pronounced /ˈkʌvərt/ (reflecting its link with the verb cover) is now usually pronounced /ˈkoʊvərt/, by analogy to overt.
- medicine, historically pronounced with two syllables but now quite often with three (some speakers use two when they mean medicaments and three when they mean medical knowledge; the pronunciation with three syllables is standard in the United States).
- Bartholomew, formerly pronounced /ˈbɑːrtəlmi/ or /bɑːrˈtɒləmi/, is now /bɑːrˈθɒləmjuː/.
- Anthony (from Latin Antonius), now (in Anglophone countries outside the UK) is typically /ˈænθəni/ rather than /ˈæntəni/.
- Sir George Everest's surname is pronounced /ˈiːvrɪst/. The mountain named after him – Mount Everest – is generally pronounced /ˈɛvərɪst/.
- Interjections such as tsk tsk! or tut tut! (a pair of dental clicks), now commonly /ˈtɪsk ˈtɪsk/ and /ˈtʌt ˈtʌt/.
- The words Arctic, Antarctic and Antarctica were originally pronounced without the first /k/, but the spelling pronunciation has become very common. The first c was originally added to the spelling for etymological reasons and was then misunderstood as not being silent.
- herb, a word with origins in Old French, is generally pronounced with a silent h in the United States. The same was true of the United Kingdom until the 19th century, when it adopted a spelling pronunciation, with an audible h.
- Ralph, originally pronounced /reɪf/ or /ˈrɑːf/ in the United Kingdom, is now often pronounced /rælf/.
- nephew was, until recent generations, predominantly pronounced /ˈnɛvjuː/ in Britain, descended from Middle English nevew and originally borrowed from Old French neveu, a spelling which remains unchanged into modern French. But the v was later changed to ph where the p hints at its Latin root nepot-, which can be found in more recent Latin loanwords like nepotism. Today, spelling pronunciation has shifted the word's pronunciation predominantly to /ˈnɛfjuː/.

=== Borrowings ===
When English borrows words from other languages, it usually keeps the original spelling, and they are often pronounced according to English conventions:

- Italian maraschino, bruschetta pronounced with /ʃ/ rather than /sk/;
- Italian pistachio (Italian spelling pistacchio) pronounced with /tʃ/ (or with /ʃ/, as if it were a French word) rather than /kk/;
- French hotel (French spelling hôtel, with silent h) pronounced with /h/.
- German spiel and stein pronounced with /s/ rather than /ʃ/.
- Spanish armadillo, llama pronounced /l/;
- Norwegian ski pronounced with /sk/ rather than /ʃ/.
- Equip (French équiper) pronounced with /kw/ rather than /k/.

In some cases, the original sounds simply do not exist in English:

- French champagne pronounced /ʃæmˈpeɪn/ rather than /ʃɑ̃paɲ/.

North American placenames of non-English origin often preserve the spelling and are almost always anglicized using a spelling pronunciation

- French: St. Louis, Missouri /sɛ̃ lwi/ ⇒ /seɪnt ˈluːɪs/; Montpelier, Vermont /mɔ̃pɛlje/ ⇒ /mɒntˈpiːliər/; New Orleans, Louisiana /ɔʁleɑ̃/ ⇒ /ˈɔːrlənz/; Detroit, Michigan /detʁwa/ ⇒ /dɪˈtrɔɪt/; Pierre, South Dakota /pjɛʁ/ ⇒ /pɪər/; Versailles, Kentucky /vɛʁsaj/ ⇒ /vɜːrˈseɪlz/; Des Moines, Iowa /de mwan/ ⇒ /də ˈmɔɪn/ (the s's remain silent); Terre Haute, Indiana /tɛʁ ot/ ⇒ /ˌtɛrə ˈhoʊt/.
- Mexico and Texas (from Native American languages through Spanish) are pronounced with /ks/ in English, though in Spanish they were originally pronounced with /ʃ/, now with /x~h/. Likewise, Don Quixote used to be pronounced /ˈkwɪksət/ or /ˈkwɪksoʊt/ in English (hence quixotic, quixotism), but by now Spanish-styled pronunciation /kiːˈhoʊti/ has become common.

== Opinions ==
Spelling pronunciations give rise to varied opinions. Often, those who retain the old pronunciation consider the spelling pronunciation to be a mark of ignorance or insecurity. Those who use a spelling pronunciation may not be aware that it is one and consider the earlier version to be slovenly since it slurs over a letter. Conversely, the users of some innovative pronunciations such as "Febuary" (for February) may regard another, earlier version as a pedantic spelling pronunciation.

Henry Watson Fowler (1858–1933) reported that in his day, there was a conscious movement among schoolteachers and others encouraging people to abandon anomalous traditional pronunciations and to speak as is spelled. According to major scholars of early modern English (Dobson, Wyld et al.), in the 17th century, there was already beginning an intellectual trend in England to pronounce as is spelled. That presupposes a standard spelling system, which was only beginning to form at the time. Similarly, quite a large number of corrections slowly spread from scholars to the general public in France, starting several centuries ago.

A different variety of spelling pronunciations are phonetic adaptations, pronunciations of the written form of foreign words within the frame of the phonemic system of the language that accepts them. An example of that process is the final silent consonant in French croissant /kʁwa.sɑ̃/ sometimes being pronounced /kɹəˈsɑnt/ in English.

== Children and foreigners ==
Children who read frequently often have spelling pronunciations because, if they do not consult a dictionary, they have only the spelling to indicate the pronunciation of words that are uncommon in the spoken language. Well-read second language learners may also have spelling pronunciations.

In some instances, a population in a formerly non-English-speaking area may retain such second language markers in the now native-English speaking population. For example, Scottish Standard English is replete with second language marks from when Scots started to be subsumed by English in the 17th century.

However, since there are many words that one reads far more often than one hears, adult native-language speakers also succumb. In such circumstances, the spelling pronunciation may well become more comprehensible than the other. That, in turn, leads to the language evolution mentioned above. What is a spelling pronunciation in one generation can become the standard pronunciation in the next.

== In other languages ==
In French, the modern pronunciation of the 16th-century French author Montaigne’s name as [mɔ̃tɛɲ], rather than the contemporary [mɔ̃taɲ], is a spelling pronunciation.

When English club was first borrowed into French, the approved pronunciation was [klab], as being a reasonable approximation of the English. The standard then became [klyb] on the basis of the spelling, and later, in Europe, [klœb], deemed closer to the English original. The standard pronunciation in Quebec French remains [klʏb]. Similarly, shampooing "shampoo; product for washing the hair" at the time of borrowing was [ʃɑ̃puiŋ] but it is now [ʃɑ̃pwɛ̃].

Old Italian had a pair of post-alveolar affricates /t͡ʃ/ and /d͡ʒ/ (as in [ˈpaːt͡ʃe] and [priviˈlɛːd͡ʒo], written pace and privilegio), and one of post-alveolar fricatives /ʃ/ and /ʒ/ (as in [ˈbaːʃo] and [ˈprɛːʒo], written bascio/bacio and presgio/pregio), which could only occur between vowels. During the 13th century, the afore mentioned affricates became allophonically fricatives if singleton and intervocalic (the modern Tuscan pronunciation of pace and privilegio being [ˈpaːʃe] and [priviˈlɛːʒo]), essentially merging /t͡ʃ/ - /ʃ/ and /d͡ʒ/ - /ʒ/ into positional allophones and rendering obsolete and useless the -s- spellings. After the Italian Unification, the Tuscan pronunciation of pace and privilegio was deemed too vulgar and dialectal for the standard language, and the original pronunciation was indirectly restored; in the modern Standard Italian accent, they are always realized as [ˈpaːt͡ʃe] and [priviˈlɛːd͡ʒo]. Since the spelling did not distinguish between the original pairs of post-alveolar affricates and fricatives, bacio and pregio started being unetymologically pronounced [ˈbaːt͡ʃo] and [ˈprɛːd͡ʒo] as well.

In present-day Italian, a few early English loanwords are pronounced according to Italian spelling rules such as water ("toilet bowl," from English water (closet)), pronounced [ˈvater], and tramway, pronounced [tranˈvai]. The Italian word ovest ("west") comes from a spelling pronunciation of French ouest (which, in turn, is a phonetic transcription of English west); that particular instance of spelling pronunciation must have occurred before the 16th century, when the letters u and v were still indistinct.

A few foreign proper names are normally pronounced according to the pronunciation of the original language (or a close approximation of it), but they retain an older spelling pronunciation when they are used as parts of Italian street names. For example, the name of Edward Jenner retains its usual English pronunciation in most contexts, but Viale Edoardo Jenner (a main street in Milan) is pronounced [ˈvjale edoˈardo 'jɛnner]. The use of such old-fashioned spelling pronunciations was probably encouraged by the custom of translating given names when streets were named after foreign people: Edoardo for Edward, or Giorgio for George for Via Giorgio Washington.

In Spanish, the ch in some German words is pronounced /tʃ/ or /ʃ/, instead of /x/. Bach is pronounced [bax], and Kuchen is [ˈkuxen], but Rorschach is [ˈrorʃaʃ], rather than [ˈrorʃax], Mach is [maʃ] or [mat͡ʃ], and Kirchner is [ˈkirʃner] or [ˈkirt͡ʃner]. Other spelling pronunciations are club pronounced [klub], iceberg pronounced [iθeˈβer] in Spain (in the Americas, it is pronounced [ˈajsbɚɡ]), and folclor and folclore as translations of folklore, pronounced [folˈklor] and [folˈkloɾe]. Also in Spanish, the acute accent in the French word élite is taken as a Spanish stress mark, and the word is pronounced [ˈelite].

When Slavic languages like Polish or Czech borrow words from English with their spelling preserved, the pronunciation tends to follow the rules of the receiving language. Words such as marketing are pronounced as spelled, instead of the more phonetically faithful [ˈmarkɨtɨng].

In standard Finnish, the sound /d/ developed as a spelling pronunciation for the letter d, though it originally represented a /ð/ sound. Similarly, /ts/ in words like metsä (forest) is a pronunciation spelling of tz used in pre-1770s orthography, which originally represented a long /θ/ sound. The dental fricatives had become rare by the 1700s, when the standard pronunciations started to develop into their current forms, which became official in the 1800s. The /d/ sound, however, is not present in most dialects and is generally replaced by a /r/, /l/ or simply dropped (e.g. lähde "water spring" may be pronounced as lähre, lähle or lähe). Standard ts is often replaced with tt or ht (mettä, mehtä).

In Vietnamese, initial v is often pronounced like a y ([j]) in the central and southern varieties. However, in formal speech, speakers often revert to the spelling pronunciation, which is increasingly being used in casual speech as well.

Chinese has a similar phenomenon called youbian dubian where unfamiliar characters may be read with the pronunciation of similar characters that feature the same phonetic component. For instance, the character 町 is rarely used in Chinese but is often used in Japanese place names (where it is pronounced chō). When read in Mandarin Chinese, it came to be pronounced dīng (such as in Ximending, a district in Taipei that was named during Japanese occupation) in analogy with the character 丁 (also pronounced dīng), even though its expected etymological reflex is tǐng.

In Welsh the word cadair is traditionally pronounced with either a /a/ or /ɛ/, depending on dialect, in the final syllable – i.e. ⟨ai⟩. The pronunciation /-air/ is a spelling pronunciation; the spelling was settled on so as not to give preference to any particular dialect. A similar situation occurred with the word eisiau which is usually pronounced /ɪʃɛ/ or /ɪʃa/ but many younger and second-language learners pronounce it as spelt: /ɛiʃaɨ/.

== See also ==
- Acronym
- Folk etymology
- Heterography
- Hypercorrection
- Hyperforeignism
- Orthography
- Spelling reform
- The Chaos
- Padonkaffsky jargon
