= Yǒu biān dú biān =

Rule of thumb for Chinese pronunciation

Yǒu biān dú biān (simplified Chinese: 有边读边; traditional Chinese: 有邊讀邊; pinyin: yǒu biān dú biān; lit. '[if] there is a side... read the side'), or dú bàn biān (读半边; 讀半邊; dú bàn biān; 'read the half'), is a rule of thumb people use to pronounce a Chinese character when they do not know its exact pronunciation. A longer version is '有邊讀邊，沒邊讀中間' (yǒu biān dú biān, méi biān dú zhōngjiān; lit. "[if] there is a side, read the side; [if] there is no side, read the middle part").

Around 90% of Chinese characters are phono-semantic compounds that consist of two parts: a semantic part (often the radical) that suggests a general meaning (e.g. the part 貝 [shell] usually indicates that a character concerns commerce, as people used shells as currency in ancient times), and a phonetic part which shows how the character is or was pronounced (e.g. the part 皇 (pinyin: huáng) usually indicates that a character is pronounced huáng in Mandarin Chinese).

The phonetic part represents the exact or almost-exact pronunciation of the character when the character was first created; characters sharing the same phonetic part had identical or similar readings. Linguists rely heavily on this fact to reconstruct the sounds of ancient Chinese. However, over time, the reading of a character may be no longer the one indicated by the phonetic part due to sound change and general vagueness.

When one encounters such a two-part character and does not know its exact pronunciation, one may take one of the parts as the phonetic indicator. For example, reading 詣 (pinyin: yì) as zhǐ because its "side" 旨 is pronounced as such. Some of these readings have become acceptable over time; they have been listed in dictionaries as alternative pronunciations, or simply become the common reading. For example, the character 町 ting in 西門町 (Ximending) is read as if it were 丁 ding. It has been called a "phenomenon of analogy", and is observed in as early as the Song dynasty.

== See also ==
- Spelling pronunciation
- The Chinese Language: Fact and Fantasy
