= Murders of Sumarti Ningsih and Jesse Lorena =

2014 double murder in Hong Kong

- Sumarti Ningsih and Jesse Lorena
- Date: October 27 – November 1, 2014
- Location: Wan Chai, Hong Kong
- Accused: Rurik Jutting
- Convicted: November 8, 2016
- Charges: Murder, sexual assault
- Verdict: Guilty
- Sentence: Life imprisonment

Sumarti Ningsih was found dead, and Seneng Mujiasih near death, on November 1, 2014, in a luxurious one-bedroom apartment in Wan Chai, Hong Kong. Mujiasih, who was pronounced dead shortly after being found, also used the name Jesse Lorena Ruri. The apartment was rented by Rurik George Caton Jutting, who was convicted of and sentenced to life imprisonment for their murders on 8 November 2016.

== Murders ==
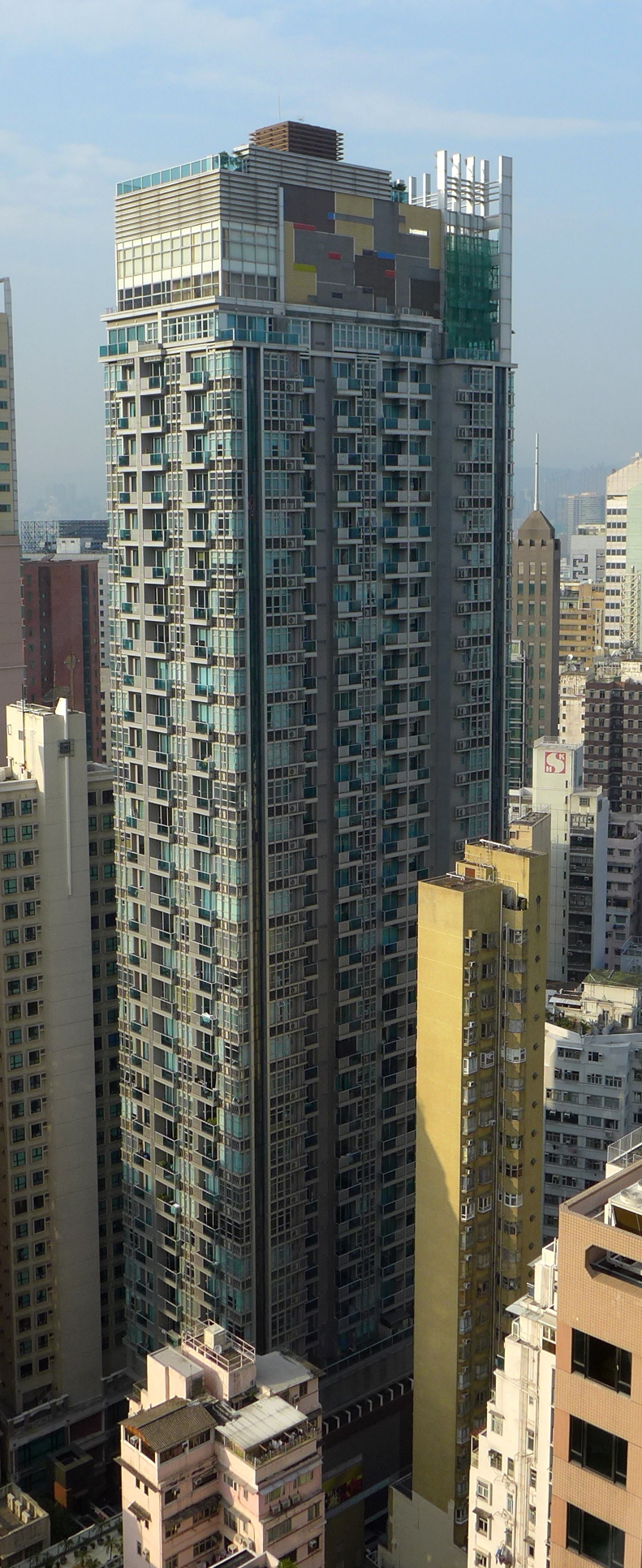
The J Residence in Wan Chai in 2013

The two female victims were originally believed to be sex workers from Southeast Asia. Ningsih, 25, is believed to be Indonesian and Lorena, at first unidentified, was thought to be 30, and of Philippine origin. However, it was later revealed Lorena was from a region near Java, Indonesia. Lorena's occupation as a sex worker is also disputed.

Sumarti Ningsih is believed to have arrived in Hong Kong a month before the murder on a tourist visa, and been murdered on 27 October 2014. The last known contact from Ningsih was on 26 October 2014, near Lockhart Road in Wan Chai. Jesse Lorena is thought to have resided in Hong Kong for more than eight years, originally worked as a domestic helper, but transitioned to a "part-time disc jockey in a pub" at the time of the murder. Lorena was last seen at around 20:45 on 31 October 2014, outside a pub in the Wan Chai red light district, and spoke briefly to Robert van den Bosch, a Dutch DJ who worked at the pub, who had also been Lorena's acquaintance for four years. She said, "I'm going to have fun. I'm going to a Halloween party," before leaving; this was the last known communication from Lorena before her murder. The two women were found murdered at the J Residence in Wan Chai. On the morning of 1 November 2014, Jutting called the police three times to report that "something happened" in his 31st-floor one-bedroom flat. His call at 3:42 am requested the police investigate his apartment. When the police arrived, a 12-inch knife, sex toys and cocaine were found at the apartment, and Lorena was found lying naked on the floor, with cut wounds to her neck, throat and buttocks; she was alive when the police arrived but was pronounced dead soon after. Jutting had been talking "delirious nonsense" and was arrested at the scene.

Eight hours after Jutting's arrest, a second partially decapitated female corpse was discovered in a large black suitcase on the balcony of the apartment. The badly decomposing corpse was partially clothed, wrapped in towels and had her hands and legs bound with ropes. It was later identified as Ningsih's.

Police examined the contents of Jutting's phone, and found about 2000 photos. Jutting had taken photos of himself with different portions of the corpses, including sexual organs and the partially severed head of Ningsih, and also said in a video that he killed one of the victims. Jutting was charged with the murder of the two women. After his arrest, he refused to cooperate with police.

== Aftermath ==
Following the murders, the Hong Kong police raided the Neptune III basement dance club in the Wan Chai district. Officers checked work and immigration papers while police vans took up positions in the local streets. A reconstruction of the murders was scheduled for 8 November 2014.

Indonesian police have been coordinating with Interpol and the Foreign Office to find out more about this event. They also collected antemortem data required to identify the victims. Indonesian foreign minister, Retno Marsudi said that the government will do the best to fulfil their citizen rights.

== Victims ==
=== Sumarti Ningsih ===
Sumarti Ningsih (a.k.a. Alice, in Hong Kong) was born in Cilacap, Indonesia, on 22 April 1991. After graduating from elementary school, she married and had a son who was five years old at the time of her death. Ningsih first went to Hong Kong in 2011, where she worked as domestic helper for two years and eight months. When she returned to Indonesia in 2013, she attended a disc jockey course for five months in Yogyakarta. Ningsih returned to Hong Kong in August 2014 with a tourist visa, looking for a new job as disc jockey. Before the murders, she told her family that she intended to return home on 2 November 2014.

=== Jesse Lorena ===
Seneng Mujiasih (a.k.a. Jesse Lorena, in Hong Kong) was a 30-year-old woman, from Muna Regency, Southeast Sulawesi, Indonesia who first came to Hong Kong to work as a domestic helper in 2006. The Indonesian Consulate-General in Hong Kong said Mujiasih had overstayed as her Hong Kong work permit had expired.

== Perpetrator ==
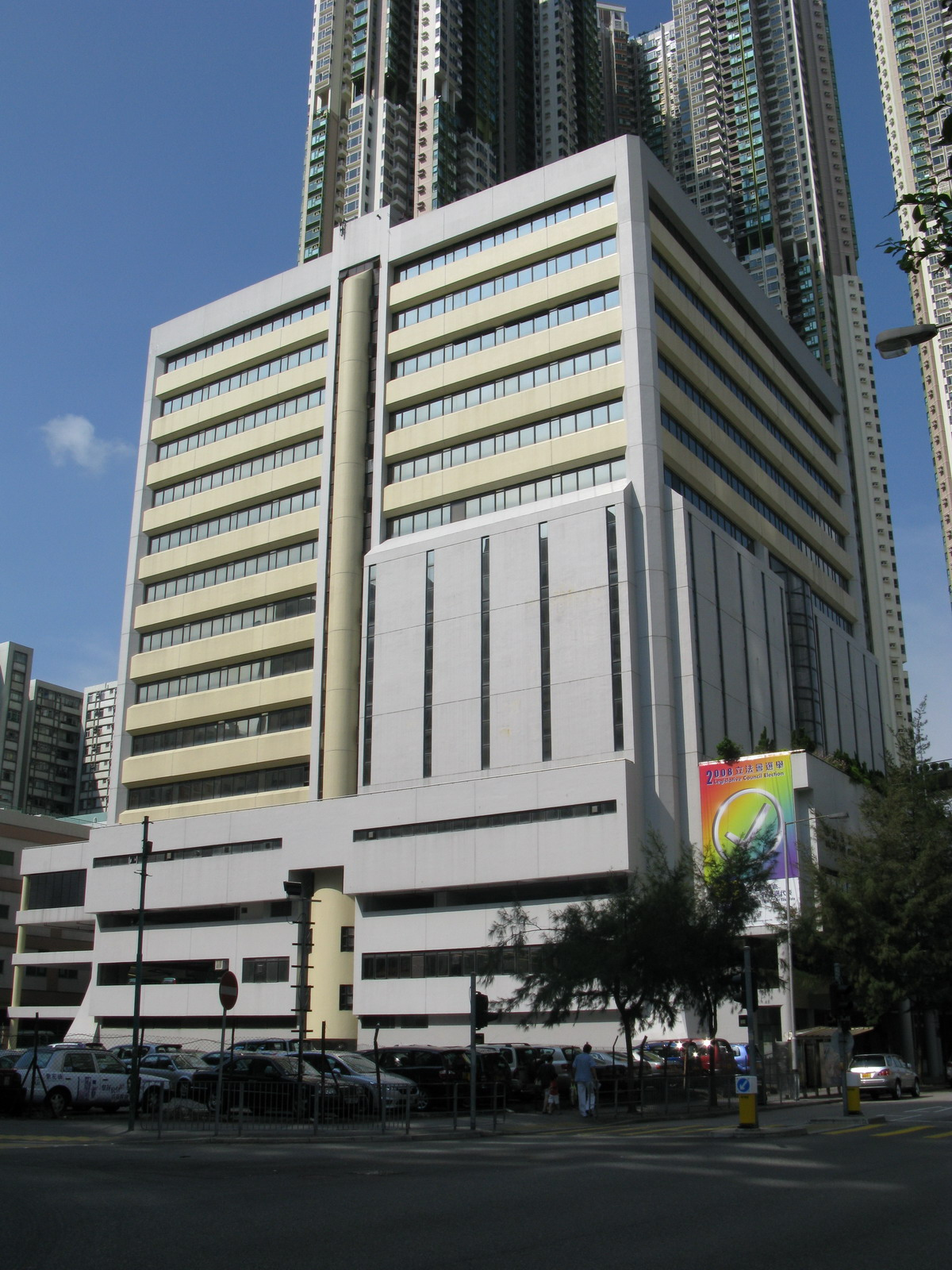
Eastern Magistrates Court

Rurik George Caton Jutting was born March 1985 in London, England is a British citizen, and a former Bank of America Merrill Lynch employee; he resigned on the Monday before the murders. Jutting was educated at Winchester College and Peterhouse, Cambridge. He is believed to have started his career working for Barclays Bank in the United Kingdom after graduating from Cambridge with a degree in history and law. He then worked for Bank of America Merrill Lynch's London office from July 2010 until his move to the Hong Kong office in July 2013. He worked on "tax-minimization trades that are under scrutiny from prosecutors, regulators, tax collectors and the bank’s own compliance department", according to The Wall Street Journal, and he was also reported to be a competitive poker player.

A friend of Jutting while he was a student at Cambridge said he was 'awkward' around girls. Another female friend described Jutting as 'hard-working and intelligent - a gentleman'.

Jutting's mental stability is in question. He was reportedly devastated when his fiancée cheated on him with another man. Jutting attempted to forgive the betrayal and patch up the relationship but was unable to do so. His fiancée left the day their relationship ended because 'his reaction was so extreme'. After his arrest, an automated email reply from Jutting's work email said the banker was out of office "indefinitely," and appeared to describe him as "an insane psychopath." The message also contained the line 'For escalation please contact God, though suspect the devil will have custody [Last line only really worked if I had followed through]'.

== Trial, appeals, and imprisonment ==
The criminal case, officially known as Hong Kong Special Administrative Region v Jutting Rurik George Caton, ESC3743/14, was heard at the Court of First Instance. Jutting appeared in court and expressed understanding of the charges brought against him, but declined to enter a plea, before the court was adjourned until 10 November 2014.

Although four psychiatrists testified that he had narcissistic personality disorder, Jutting was declared mentally fit to stand trial as a result of his November court appearance, with the case adjourned to July 2015.

On 8 November 2016, Jutting was found guilty of two counts of murder, and was sentenced to life imprisonment.

In August 2018, Hong Kong's Court of Final Appeal rejected his appeal after just 8 minutes of deliberation. He was returned to maximum security Stanley Prison to serve out his life sentence.
