= Chinese character classification =

Chinese characters are generally logographs, but can be further categorized based on the manner of their creation or derivation. Some characters may be analysed structurally as compounds created from smaller components, while some are not decomposable in this way. A small number of characters originate as pictographs and ideographs, but the vast majority are what are called phono-semantic compounds, which involve an element of pronunciation in their meaning.

A traditional six-fold classification scheme was originally popularized in the 2nd century CE, and remained the dominant lens for analysis for almost two millennia, but with the benefit of a greater body of historical evidence, recent scholarship has variously challenged and discarded those categories. In older literature, Chinese characters are often referred to as "ideographs", inheriting a historical misconception of Egyptian hieroglyphs.

== Overview ==
Chinese characters have been used in several different writing systems throughout history. The concept of a writing system includes both the written symbols themselves, called graphemes—which may include characters, numerals, or punctuation—as well as the rules by which they are used to record language. Chinese characters are logographs, which are graphemes that represent units of meaning in a language. Specifically, characters represent the smallest units of meaning in a language, which are referred to as morphemes. Morphemes in Chinese—and therefore the characters used to write them—are nearly always a single syllable in length. In some special cases, characters may denote non-morphemic syllables as well; due to this, written Chinese is often characterised as morphosyllabic. (Note: According to Handel: "While monosyllabism generally trumps morphemicity—that is to say, a bisyllabic morpheme is nearly always written with two characters rather than one—there is an unmistakable tendency for script users to impose a morphemic identity on the linguistic units represented by these characters.") Logographs may be contrasted with letters in an alphabet, which generally represent phonemes, the distinct units of sound used by speakers of a language. Despite their origins in picture-writing, Chinese characters are no longer ideographs capable of representing ideas directly; their comprehension relies on the reader's knowledge of the particular language being written.

The areas where Chinese characters were historically used—sometimes collectively termed the Sinosphere—have a long tradition of lexicography attempting to explain and refine their use; for most of history, analysis revolved around a model first popularized in the 2nd-century Shuowen Jiezi dictionary. More recent models have analysed the methods used to create characters, how characters are structured, and how they function in a given writing system.

=== Structural analysis ===
Most characters can be analysed structurally as compounds made of smaller components (部件; bùjiàn), which are often independent characters in their own right, adjusted to occupy a given position in the compound. Components within a character may serve a specific function: phonetic components provide a hint for the character's pronunciation, and semantic components indicate some element of the character's meaning. Components that serve neither function may be classified as pure signs with no particular meaning, other than their presence distinguishing one character from another.

A straightforward structural classification scheme may consist of three pure classes of semantographs, phonographs and signs—having only semantic, phonetic, and form components respectively, as well as classes corresponding to each combination of component types. Of the 3500 characters that are frequently used in Standard Chinese, pure semantographs are estimated to be the rarest, accounting for about 5% of the lexicon, followed by pure signs with 18%, and semantic–form and phonetic–form compounds together accounting for 19%. The remaining 58% are phono-semantic compounds.

The Chinese palaeographer Qiu Xigui (b. 1935) presents three principles of character function adapted from earlier proposals by Tang Lan (1901–1979) and Chen Mengjia (1911–1966), with semantographs describing all characters whose forms are wholly related to their meaning, regardless of the method by which the meaning was originally depicted, phonographs that include a phonetic component, and loangraphs encompassing existing characters that have been borrowed to write other words. Qiu also acknowledges the existence of character classes that fall outside of these principles, such as pure signs.

== Semantographs ==
=== Pictographs ===
Most of the oldest characters are pictographs (象形; xiàngxíng), representational pictures of physical objects. Examples include 日 ('Sun'), 月 ('Moon'), and 木 ('tree'). Over time, the forms of pictographs have been simplified in order to make them easier to write. As a result, it is often no longer evident what thing was originally being depicted by a pictograph; without knowing the context of its origin in picture-writing, it may be interpreted instead as a pure sign. However, if its use in compounds still reflects a pictograph's original meaning, as with 日 in 晴 ('clear sky'), it can still be analysed as a semantic component.

Oracle bone	Seal	Clerical	Semi-cursive	Cursive	Regular		Plain Text		Pinyin	Gloss
Oracle bone	Seal	Clerical	Semi-cursive	Cursive	Traditional	Simplified	Traditional	Simplified	Pinyin	Gloss
							日		rì	'Sun'
							月		yuè	'Moon'
							山		shān	'mountain'
							水		shuǐ	'water'
							雨		yǔ	'rain'
							木		mù	'wood'
							禾		hé	'rice plant'
							人		rén	'person'
							女		nǚ	'woman'
							母		mǔ	'mother'
							目		mù	'eye'
							牛		niú	'cow'
							羊		yáng	'goat'
							馬	马	mǎ	'horse'
							鳥	鸟	niǎo	'bird'
							龜	龟	guī	'turtle'
							龍	龙	lóng	'dragon'
							鳳	凤	fèng	'phoenix'

=== Indicatives ===
Indicatives (指事; zhǐshì; 'indication') depict an abstract idea with an iconic form, including iconic modification of pictographs. In the examples below, the numerals representing small numbers are represented a corresponding number of strokes, directions are represented by a graphical indication above or below a line. Parts of a tree are communicated by indicating the corresponding part of the pictogram meaning 'tree'.

Character	一	二	三	上	下	本	末
Pinyin	yī	èr	sān	shàng	xià	běn	mò
Gloss	'one'	'two'	'three'	'up'	'below'	'root' (Note: A tree (木) with the base highlighted by an extra stroke.)	'apex' (Note: A tree (木) with the top highlighted by an extra stroke.)

=== Compound ideographs ===
Compound ideographs (會意; huì yì; 'joined meaning'), also called associative compounds, logical aggregates, or syssemantographs, are compounds of two or more pictographic or ideographic characters to suggest the meaning of the word to be represented. Xu Shen gave two examples:

- 武; 'military', formed from 戈; 'dagger-axe' and 止; 'foot'
- 信; 'truthful', formed from 人; 'person' (later reduced to 亻) and 言; 'speech'

Other characters commonly explained as compound ideographs include:

- 林; lín; 'forest', composed of two trees
- 森; sēn; 'full of trees', composed of three trees
- 休; xiū; 'rest', depicting a man by a tree
- 采; cǎi; 'harvest', depicting a hand on a bush (later written 採)
- 看; kàn; 'read', depicting a hand above an eye
- 莫; mù; 'sunset', depicting the sun disappearing into the grass, originally written as 茻; 'thick grass' enclosing 日—later written 暮.

Many characters formerly classed as compound ideographs are now believed to have been misidentified. For example, Xu's example 信 representing the word xìn ← *snjins 'truthful', is usually considered a phono-semantic compound, with 人; rén ← *njin as phonetic and ⾔ 'SPEECH' as a signific. In many cases, reduction of a character has obscured its original phono-semantic nature. For example, the character 明; 'bright' is often presented as a compound of 日; 'sun' and 月; 'moon'. However this form is probably a simplification of an attested alternative form 朙, which can be viewed as a phono-semantic compound.

Peter A. Boodberg and William G. Boltz have argued that no ancient characters were compound ideographs. Boltz accounts for the remaining cases by suggesting that some characters could represent multiple unrelated words with different pronunciations, as in Sumerian cuneiform and Egyptian hieroglyphs, and the compound characters are actually phono-semantic compounds based on an alternative reading that has since been lost. For example, the character 安; ān ← *‍ʔan 'peace' is often cited as a compound of ⼧ 'ROOF' with 女; 'woman'. Boltz speculates that the character 女 could represent both the word nǚ ← *‍nrjaʔ 'woman' and the word ān ← *‍ʔan 'settled', and that the ⼧ 'ROOF' signific was later added to disambiguate the latter usage. In support of this second reading, he points to other characters with the same 女 component that had similar pronunciations in Old Chinese: 妟; yàn ← *‍ʔrans 'tranquil', 奻; nuán ← *‍nruan 'to quarrel' and 姦; jiān ← *‍kran 'licentious'. Other scholars reject these arguments for alternative readings and consider other explanations of the data more likely, for example viewing 妟 as a reduced form of 晏, which can be analysed as a phono-semantic compound with 安 as phonetic. They consider the characters 奻 and 姦 to be implausible phonetic compounds, both because the proposed phonetic and semantic elements are identical and because the widely differing initial consonants *‍ʔ- and *‍n- would not normally be accepted in a phonetic compound. Notably, Christopher Button has shown how more sophisticated palaeographical and phonological analyses can account for the examples of Boodberg and Boltz without relying on polyphony.

While compound ideographs are a limited source of Chinese characters, they form many kokuji created in Japan to represent native words. Examples include:

- 働 hatara(ku) 'to work', formed from 人 'person' and 動 'move'
- 峠 tōge 'mountain pass', formed from 山 'mountain', 上 'up' and 下 'down'

As Japanese creations, such characters had no Chinese or Sino-Japanese readings, but a few have been assigned invented Sino-Japanese readings. For example, the common character 働 has been given the reading dō, taken from 動, and even borrowed into modern written Chinese with the reading dòng.

== Loangraphs ==
The phenomenon of existing characters being adapted to write other words with similar pronunciations was necessary in the initial development of Chinese writing, and has continued throughout its history. Some loangraphs (假借; jiǎjiè; 'borrowing') are introduced to represent words previously lacking another written form—this is often the case with abstract grammatical particles such as 之 and 其. For example, the character 來 (lái) was originally a pictograph of a wheat plant, with the meaning *‍m-rˁək 'wheat'. As this was pronounced similar to the Old Chinese word *‍mə.rˁək 'to come', 來 was loaned to write this verb. Eventually, 'to come' became established as the default reading, and a new character 麥 (mài) was devised for 'wheat'. When a character is used as a rebus this way, it is called a 假借字 (jiǎjièzì; 'borrowed character'), translatable as 'phonetic loan character' or 'rebus character'.

The process of characters being borrowed as loangraphs should not be conflated with the distinct process of semantic extension, where a word acquires additional senses, which often remain written with the same character. As both processes often result in a single character form being used to write several distinct meanings, loangraphs are often misidentified as being the result of semantic extension, and vice versa.

As with Egyptian hieroglyphs and cuneiform, early Chinese characters were used as rebuses to express abstract meanings that were not easily depicted. Thus, many characters represented more than one word. In some cases the extended use would take over completely, and a new character would be created for the original meaning, usually by modifying the original character with a determinative. For instance, 又 (yòu) originally meant 'right hand', but was borrowed to write the abstract adverb yòu ('again'). Modern usage is exclusively the latter sense, while 右 (yòu), which adds the ⼝ 'MOUTH' radical, represents the sense meaning 'right'. This process of graphical disambiguation is a common source of phono-semantic compound characters.

Loangraphs are also used to write words borrowed from other languages, such as the various Buddhist terminology introduced to China in antiquity, as well as contemporary non-Chinese words and names. For example, each character in the name 加拿大 (Jiānádà; 'Canada') is often used as a loangraph for its respective syllable. However, the barrier between a character's pronunciation and meaning is never total: when transcribing into Chinese, loangraphs are often chosen deliberately as to create certain connotations. This is regularly done with corporate brand names: for example, Coca-Cola's Chinese name is 可口可乐; 可口可樂 (Kěkǒu Kělè; 'delicious enjoyable').

Examples of jiajiezi
Character	Rebus	Original	New character
四	sì 'four'	sì 'nostrils'	泗
枼	yè 'flat', 'thin'	yè 'leaf'	葉
北	běi 'north'	bèi 'back (of the body)'	背
要	yào 'to want'	yāo 'waist'	腰
少	shǎo 'few'	shā 'sand'	沙 and 砂
永	yǒng 'forever'	yǒng 'swim'	泳

While the word jiajie has been used since the Han dynasty (202 BCE – 220 CE), the related term tongjia (通假; 'interchangeable borrowing') is first attested during the Ming dynasty (1368–1644). The two terms are commonly used as synonyms, but there is a distinction between jiajiezi being a phonetic loan character for a word that did not originally have a character, such as using 東 ('a bag tied at both ends') for dōng ('east'), and tongjia being an interchangeable character used for an existing homophonous character, such as using 蚤 (zǎo; 'flea') for 早 (zǎo; 'early').

According to Bernhard Karlgren (1889–1978), "One of the most dangerous stumbling-blocks in the interpretation of pre-Han texts is the frequent occurrence of loan characters."

== Phonographs ==
=== Phono-semantic compounds ===
Phono-semantic compounds (形声; 形聲; xíngshēng; 'form and sound' or 谐声; 諧聲; xiéshēng; 'sound agreement') represent most of the modern Chinese lexicon. They are created as compounds of at least two components:

- a phonetic component via the rebus principle, with approximately the correct pronunciation.
- a semantic component, also called a determinative or signific, one of a limited number of characters that supplies an element of meaning. In most cases this is also the radical under which a character is listed in a dictionary.

As in ancient Egyptian writing, such compounds eliminated the ambiguity caused by phonetic loans. This process can be repeated, with a phono-semantic compound character itself being used as a phonetic in a further compound, which can result in quite complex characters, such as 劇 (豦 = 虍 + 豕, 劇 = 刂 + 豦). Often, the semantic component is on the left, but there are other possible positions.

As an example, a verb 'to wash oneself' is pronounced mù, which happens to be homophonous with 'tree', which was written with the pictograph 木. The verb mù could have simply been written 木, but to disambiguate it was compounded with the character for 'water', which gives some idea of the word's meaning. The result was eventually written as 沐 (mù; 'to wash one's hair'). Similarly, the ⽔ 'WATER' determinative was combined with 林 (lín; 'woods') to produce the water-related homophone 淋 (lín; 'to pour').

Determinative	Rebus	Compound
氵 'WATER'	木; mù	沐; mù; 'to wash oneself'
氵 'WATER'	林; lín	淋; lín; 'to pour'

However, the phonetic is not always as meaningless as this example would suggest. Rebuses were sometimes chosen that were compatible semantically as well as phonetically. It was also often the case that the determinative merely constrained the meaning of a word which already had several. 菜; cài; 'vegetable' is a case in point. The determinative ⾋ 'GRASS' for plants was combined with 采; cǎi; 'harvest'. However, 采; cǎi does not merely provide the pronunciation. In Classical texts, it was also used to mean 'vegetable'. That is, 采 underwent a semantic extension from 'harvest' to 'vegetable', and the addition of ⾋ 'GRASS' merely specified that the latter meaning was to be understood.

Determinative	Rebus	Compound
艹 'GRASS'	采; cǎi; 'to gather'	菜; cài; 'vegetable'
扌 'HAND'	白; bái	拍; pāi; 'to hit'
⽳ 'CAVE'	九; jiǔ	究; jiū; 'to investigate'
日 'SUN'	央; yāng	映; yìng; 'reflection'

==== Sound change ====
Originally characters sharing the same phonetic had similar readings, though they have now diverged substantially. Linguists rely heavily on this fact to reconstruct the sounds of Old Chinese. Contemporary foreign pronunciations of characters are also used to reconstruct historical Chinese pronunciation, chiefly that of Middle Chinese.

When people try to read an unfamiliar compound, they will typically assume that it is constructed on phono-semantic principles and follow the rule of thumb to youbian dubian "read the side, if there is a side", and take one component to be the phonetic, which often results in errors. Since the sound changes that had taken place over the two to three thousand years since the Old Chinese period have been extensive, in some instances, the phono-semantic natures of some compound characters have been obliterated, with the phonetic component providing no useful phonetic information at all in the modern language. For instance, 逾 (yú; /y³⁵/; 'exceed'), 輸 (shū; /ʂu⁵⁵/; 'lose', 'donate'), 偷 (tōu; /tʰoʊ̯⁵⁵/; 'steal', 'get by') share the phonetic 俞 (yú; /y³⁵/; 'agree') but their pronunciations bear no resemblance to each other in Standard Chinese or any other variety. In Old Chinese, the phonetic has the reconstructed pronunciation *lo, while the phono-semantic compounds listed above have been reconstructed as *lo *l̥o and *l̥ˤo respectively. Nonetheless, all characters containing 俞 are pronounced in Standard Chinese as various tonal variants of yu, shu, tou, and the closely related you and zhu.

==== Simplification ====
Since the phonetic elements of many characters no longer accurately represent their pronunciations, when the Chinese government simplified character forms, they often substituted phonetics that were simpler to write, but also more accurate to the modern Standard Chinese pronunciation. This has sometimes resulted in forms which are less phonetic than the original ones in varieties of Chinese other than Standard Chinese. For the example below, many determinatives have also been simplified, usually by standardizing existing cursive forms.

	Determinative	Rebus	Compound
Traditional	⾦ 'GOLD'	童; tóng	鐘; zhōng; 'bell'
Simplified	钅 'GOLD'	中; zhōng	钟; zhōng; 'bell'

=== Phonetic–phonetic compounds ===
A technique (Hội âm; 會音) used with chữ Nôm used to write Vietnamese and sawndip used to write Zhuang with no equivalent in China created compounds using two phonetic components. In Vietnamese, this was done because Vietnamese phonology included consonant clusters not found in Chinese, and were thus poorly approximated by the sound values of borrowed characters. Compounds used components with two distinct consonant sounds to specify the cluster, e.g. 𢁋 (blăng; (Note: This is the Middle Vietnamese pronunciation; the word is pronounced in modern Vietnamese as trăng.) 'Moon') was created as a compound of 巴 (ba) and 陵 (lăng).

== Signs ==
Some characters and components are pure signs, whose meaning merely derives from their having a fixed and distinct form. Basic examples of pure signs are found with the numerals beyond four, e.g. 五 ('five') and 八 ('eight'), whose forms do not give visual hints to the quantities they represent.

== Ligatures and portmanteaux ==
There is a class of characters formed as ligatures (合文; héwén) of the characters making up multi-syllable words. These are distinct from ideographic compounds, which illustrate the meaning of single morphemes. More broadly, they represent an exception to the prevailing principle that characters represent individual morphemes. A ligature character often retains the word's multi-syllable pronunciation, but can sometimes acquire additional single-syllable readings. Ligatures with pronunciations derived as contractions of the original word can be additionally characterized as portmanteaux. A common portmanteau is 甭 (béng; 'needn't'), which is a graphical ligature of 不用 (bùyòng) that is pronounced as a fusion of bù and yòng. However, this character was also created at an earlier date as 甭 (qì; 'to abandon'), where it instead functions as a true compound ideograph that represents a single unrelated morpheme. 廿 ('twenty') is a common ligature of 二十 (èrshí), and is usually read as èrshí. While its alternate readings in other varieties are portmanteaux, the reading nián used in Mandarin is not, as it was historically changed to an unrelated syllable to avoid sounding like one of the variety's expletives.

== Traditional Shuowen Jiezi classification ==
The Shuowen Jiezi is a Chinese dictionary compiled c. 100 CE by Xu Shen. It divided characters into six categories (六書; liùshū) according to what he thought was the original method of their creation. The Shuowen Jiezi ultimately popularized the six category model which would serve as the foundation of traditional Chinese lexicography for the next two millennia. Xu was not the first to use the term: it first appeared in the Rites of Zhou (2nd century BCE), though it may not have originally referred to methods of creating characters. When Liu Xin (d. 23 CE) edited the Rites he used the term 'six categories' alongside a list of six character types, but he did not provide examples. Slightly different versions of the sixfold model are given in the Book of Han (1st century CE) and by Zheng Zhong, as quoted in Zheng Xuan's 1st-century commentary of the Rites of Zhou. In the postface to the Shuowen Jiezi, Xu illustrated each character type with a pair of examples.

While the traditional classification is still taught, it is no longer the focus of modern lexicography. Xu's categories are neither rigorously defined nor mutually exclusive: four refer to the structural composition of characters, while the other two refer to techniques of repurposing existing shapes. Modern scholars generally view Xu's categories as principles of character formation, rather than a proper classification.

The earliest extant corpus of Chinese characters are in the form of oracle bone script, attested from c. 1250 BCE at the site of Yin, the capital of the Shang dynasty during the Late Shang period (c. 1250 – c. 1050 BCE). They primarily take the form of short inscriptions on the turtle shells and the shoulder blades of oxen, which were used in an official form of divination known as scapulimancy. Oracle bone script is the direct ancestor of modern written Chinese, and is already a mature writing system in its earliest attestation. Roughly one-quarter of oracle bone script characters are pictographs, with rest either being phono-semantic compounds or compound ideographs. Despite millennia of change in shape, usage, and meaning, a few of these characters remain recognizable to modern Chinese readers.

Over 90% of the characters used in modern written vernacular Chinese originated as phono-semantic compounds. However, as both meaning and pronunciation in the language have shifted over time, many of these components no longer serve their original purpose. A lack of knowledge as to the specific histories of these components often leads to folk and false etymologies. Knowledge of the earliest forms of characters, including Shang-era oracle bone script and the Zhou-era bronze scripts, is often necessary for reconstructing their historical etymologies. Reconstructing the phonology of Middle and Old Chinese from clues present in characters is a field of historical linguistics. In Chinese, historical Chinese phonology is called yinyunxue (音韻學).

=== Derivative cognates ===
Derivative cognates (转注; 轉注; zhuǎnzhù; 'reciprocal meaning') are the smallest category, and also the least understood. They are often omitted from modern systems. Xu gave the example of 考 kǎo 'to verify' with 老 lǎo 'old', which had similar Old Chinese pronunciations of *‍khuʔ and *‍C-ruʔ (Note: "C" refers to an unknown initial consonant.) respectively. These may have had the same etymological root meaning 'elderly person', but became lexicalized into two separate words. The term does not appear in the body of the dictionary, and may have been included in the postface out of deference to Liu Xin.

== See also ==
- Chinese calligraphy
- Stroke order
- Ateji – Characters used as phonographs in Japanese
- Man'yōgana – Characters used as syllabograms in Japanese
- Transcription into Chinese characters
- Phonetic series (Chinese characters)
