= Stanley Prison =

Prison in Stanley, Hong Kong

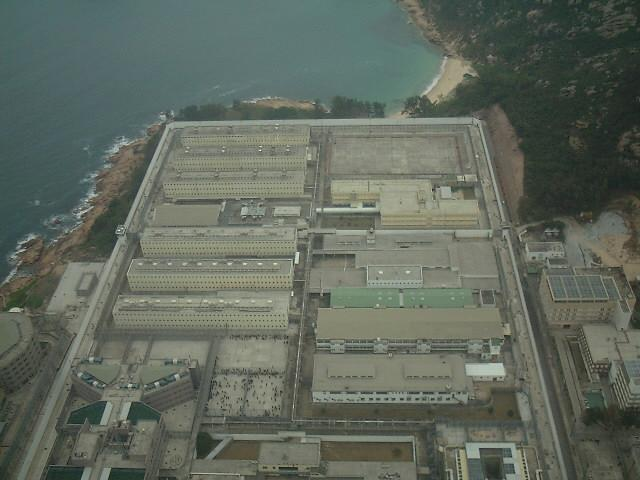
- Interactive map of Stanley Prison
- Location: Stanley, Hong Kong; 22°12′43″N 114°13′08″E
- Capacity: 1,511
- Opened: January 1937; 89 years ago
- Managed by: Hong Kong Correctional Services Department

Stanley Prison
- Traditional Chinese: 赤柱監獄
- Simplified Chinese: 赤柱监狱
Transcriptions
Standard Mandarin
- Hanyu Pinyin: Chìzhù Jiānyù
Yue: Cantonese
- Yale Romanization: Chek chyúh gāam yuhk
- Jyutping: Cek3 cyu5 gaam1 juk6

Stanley Prison (c. January 1937, previously known as Hong Kong Prison at Stanley) is one of the six maximum security facilities in Hong Kong.

== History ==
Built in 1937, Stanley Prison is currently the oldest institution still in service (the oldest prison built in Hong Kong was Victoria Prison, which ceased operation on 24 December 2005) and houses both male adult convicted prisoners and male adult remand prisoners. It was set up by the then Prisons Department, and is now administered by the Correctional Services Department. The maximum capacity of the prison is 1,511 and it has over 800 staff and officers. Stanley Prison, at the time of its construction, was considered to be one of the finest prisons in the British Empire. It was a modern structure built of stone, concrete and steel and consisted of six cell blocks set behind an 18-foot wall. It was originally designed to house 1,500 prisoners.

Before Hong Kong officially abolished the death penalty in 1993, Stanley Prison had been a place of execution between 1946 and 1966. Although the law did not change until 1993, the last execution that was carried out in Stanley Prison was in November 1966. 122 people were executed in Stanley Prison until then, however, this figure does not include the large number of prisoners who were killed by the Japanese during the occupation of Hong Kong in World War II—see below. The area which once housed the gallows has now been replaced with the prison hospital.

== Japanese occupation ==
Hong Kong fell to the invading Japanese on Christmas Day 1941 following a brief but brutal conflict. During the Japanese occupation, the grounds of the prison were used as part of Stanley Internment Camp. It was a place of torture and execution, with Mateen Ansari, who was posthumously awarded the George Cross for his heroism in resisting the Japanese, as one of the most famous victims. During the Japanese invasion of China, refugees crawled across the border to Hong Kong and many became hawkers on the streets. Those who were caught were sent to Stanley Prison and soon the inmate population grew to over 3,000, well over its limits.

== Hong Kong Correctional Services Museum ==
Adjacent to Stanley Prison is the Hong Kong Correctional Services Museum. The museum is housed in a two-storey building next to the parade ground of the Staff Training Institute of the Correctional Services Department in Stanley. It has an area of 480 square metres with a collection of some 600 artefacts.

== Notable inmates ==
- Kanao Inouye: Canadian-Japanese collaborator, hanged in 1947.
- Naomasa Sakonju: Japanese war criminal, hanged in 1948.
- Rurik Jutting: Convicted of the murders of Sumarti Ningsih and Jesse Lorena.
- Chan Man-lok and Leung Wai-lun: Convicted of the Hello Kitty murder case.
- Alex Kwong Kong-chi, Kwong Kau and Anthony Kwong Kong-kit: Convicted of the murder of Abby Choi.
- Tony Wong Chun-loong, a.k.a. Wong Yuk-long
- Ting Kai-tai: given a life sentence for the 2008 murder of Wong Ka-mui
- Jimmy Lai: Media mogul, held in solitary on charges of sedition as of 2024

== See also ==
- Prisons in Hong Kong
- Prison Gothic
- Stanley Mosque
