= Prison Gothic =

Sans serif typeface

- Category: Gothic, sans serif
- Designers: Gary Yau, Thomas Ng
- Date released: 30 November 2022

Prison Gothic is a Chinese character typeface project started in 2016. The typeface is based on street signs in Hong Kong made by Stanley Prison inmates.

== Origin ==
Prison Gothic originates from traffic signs produced by inmates of Stanley Prison in the 1970s. The inmates used cutleries to engrave characters based on the Ishii Gothic typeface; however, since traditional Chinese characters were not standarized at that time, the characters gained their distinct rigid and bold look. Beginning in the mid-1990s, the HKCSD gradually transitioned to computer-aided design and manufacturing, and by 1997, the signs were no longer manufactured at Stanley Prison. There are 700 signs remaining in Prison Gothic.

In October 2016, the Road Research Society launched the "Prison Gothic Revival Initiative", aiming to revive the typeface as a computer font. After five years of development, they launched a funding campaign in July 2022, ending on 22 August. They ultimately raised HK$1.33 million, exceeding the original target by 191%. The computer typeface was introduced in November.
