= Phonetic series (Chinese characters) =

Chinese characters sharing the same phonetic character component

A xiesheng (Chinese: 諧聲; pinyin: xiéshēng; lit. 'harmonious sound') or phonological series is a set of Chinese characters sharing the same sound-based element. Characters belonging to these series are generally phono-semantic compounds, where the character is composed of a semantic element (or radical) and a sound-based element, encoding information about the meaning and the pronunciation respectively.

For example, the character 波 is composed of the semantic component 氵 'water' and the sound component 皮 (believed to have been pronounced something like *ba). Thus, 波 represents a word which has to do with water and was pronounced something like *ba. In fact, the word which 波 represents means 'wave' and was pronounced like *pa in Middle Chinese.

By grouping together characters with the same sound component into a xiesheng series, one is able to compare words that were perceived to be quite similar in pronunciation at the time that the characters for these words were invented.

As an example, xiesheng series no. 25 from Bernhard Karlgren's Grammata Serica Recensa is reproduced below, with Middle Chinese readings in Baxter's transcription system:

- a 皮 bje
- d 疲 bje
- e 被 bjeX
- i 陂 pje
- j 披 phje
- l 波 pa
- m 跛 paX
- n 簸 paX
- n 簸 paH
- o 破 phaH
- q 婆 ba
