= Japanese script reform =

Attempt to correlate standard spoken Japanese with the written word

The Japanese script reform is the attempt to correlate standard spoken Japanese with the written word, which began during the Meiji period. This issue is known in Japan as the kokugo kokuji mondai (国語国字問題, national language and script problem). The reforms led to the development of the modern Japanese written language, and explain the arguments for official policies used to determine the usage and teaching of kanji rarely used in Japan.

== History ==
=== Pre-World War II reforms ===
A misconception is held that Japanese script reform originated from the Supreme Commander of the Allied Powers during the Occupation of Japan, but in fact, a plan had already been put into place prior to the occupation. Reform efforts date back to at least 1900, and proposals to reform kanji usage had been developed in the 1920s.

In the 1900 kana usage reforms, hentaigana (old variant forms of kana) were eliminated, though historical kana orthography (dating to the Heian period, a millennium before) was retained. A separate character for n ん was also prescribed; previously it had been written as む (the same as mu) and ん was a hentaigana for both these sounds. A proposal to eliminate certain kanji from use was implemented in a number of regions and overseas territories in the 1920s, near the end of the Taishō period.

In November 1922, the rinji kokugo chōsakai (臨時國語調査會, Select Committee on the Study of the Japanese Language), the precursor to the Japanese Language Council, now the Japanese Language subdivision of the Agency for Cultural Affairs, selected and approved a list of 1,962 kanji characters for daily use. This group of characters formed the basis for the tōyō kanji list, which eventually developed into the modern jōyō kanji list. In December 1923, the committee approved a set of reforms for kana usage; the prototype for the modern kana system.

=== Reforms ===
The reforms made after the Second World War have had a particularly significant impact on accepted kanji usage in the modern Japanese language.

On 12 November 1945, the Yomiuri Shimbun newspaper published an editorial concerning the abolition of kanji, and on 31 March 1946, the first American Education Delegation arrived in Japan at the invitation of the Supreme Commander for the Allied Powers (SCAP) and issued its first report. The report pointed out the difficulties concerning kanji use, and advocated the use of rōmaji, which they considered more convenient. As a result, the gradual abolition of kanji became official policy for the SCAP, and the tōyō kanji list and modern kana usage proposals were drawn up in accordance with this policy.

==== Tōyō kanji ====
The tōyō kanji list, containing 1850 characters, was published by the cabinet on 16 November 1946 with the intention of completely abolishing the use of kanji in the future. The list reduced the number of kanji deemed appropriate for daily use, and categorized certain kanji for specific use in official publications and documents.

Prior to this reform, an attempt had already been made to standardise several kanji, known as kyūjitai, with other forms, known as shinjitai, but was not conducted systematically. For new character forms, changes were only made to several characters with minimal modifications.

Another separate attempt was made to limit the number of kanji readings, but the first list proved much too restrictive. For instance, the character for fish 魚 had its readings limited to gyo and uo when the most common reading, sakana, was not officially recognized by the list. These shortcomings were acknowledged in the revised list of tōyō kanji, published on 28 June 1972.

On 5 July 1956, the Japanese Language Council announced a list of substitute characters for words that contained characters not on the official list in an effort to ease the implementation of tōyō kanji. This use of alternative, common kanji in place of rarer ones was called kakikae (書き換え) (also written as kakikae (書き替え)).

Different characters for words were unified using characters from the tōyō kanji list. The list below shows some examples, with the non-tōyō kanji placed in brackets.

- 注文 (註文) chūmon (order, request)
- 遺跡 (遺蹟) iseki (historic ruins)
- 更生 (甦生) kōsei (rebirth, originally read sosei, and may be written as 蘇生 to reflect the original reading)
- 知恵 (智慧) chie (wisdom)
- 略奪 (掠奪) ryakudatsu (pillage, plunder)
- 妨害 (妨碍, 妨礙) bōgai (jamming, interference)
- 意向 (意嚮) ikō (intention, idea)
- 講和 (媾和) kōwa (reconciliation, peace)
- 格闘 (挌鬭) kakutō (fighting)
- 書簡 (書翰) shokan (letter, epistle)

Jargon and other specialized words that could be written in more than one way were generally written using characters from the list.

- 骨格 (骨骼) kokkaku (skeletal structure)
- 奇形 (畸形) kikei (birth defect)

Other words that used kanji that were not included in the list were given phonetic substitutes.

- 防御 (防禦) bōgyo (defence)
- 扇動 (煽動) sendō (abet, agitate)
- 英知 (叡智) eichi (wisdom)
- 混交 (混淆) konkō (mix)
- 激高 (激昂) gekikō (excited, enraged)

For kanji compounds with characters that could not be reasonably substituted, the recommendation was to write the "missing" kanji in kana instead, a practice known as mazegaki (交ぜ書き), which is very common in the names of chemical elements.

- 皮フ (皮膚) hifu (skin)
- イ族 (彝族) izoku (Yi people)
- フッ素 (弗素) fusso (fluorine)
- たん白質 (蛋白質) tanpakushitsu (protein)
- 憂うつ (憂鬱) yū-utsu (melancholy) and うつ病 (鬱病) utsubyō (depression)

However, the recent prevalence of computers has made it easier for Japanese speakers to identify and use rarer characters, and the idea of having a list of approved characters has come under reconsideration. Japanese media have increasingly used non-approved kanji with furigana to aid the reader in place of mazegaki.

==== Kanji for names ====
On 16 February 1948, 881 of the tōyō kanji were designated to be taught during primary education, and became known as the kyōiku kanji (education kanji).

In the same year, Article 50 of the family register law made it illegal to name a child using characters not on the official list. When this law first came into effect, the Ministry of Justice declared that all newborn babies must be registered in the koseki (the Japanese family registry) with a name that used only hiragana, katakana or tōyō kanji. However, in 1951, an additional 92 characters were approved by the government as jinmeiyō kanji; kanji acceptable for use in names. This list was modified in 1997 to increase to a total of 285 characters. At the time, eight characters from the original jinmeiyō kanji list were added to the jōyō kanji (daily use) list, and were removed from the group of jinmeiyō kanji.

On 27 September 2004, another 488 kanji were approved for use in names, partly as a result of the ruling by the Sapporo High Court that it was unacceptable for so many common characters to be excluded from use in names simply because they were not part of the official list. 578 characters were initially added, though some characters unsuitable for names such as 怨 (grudge, resent), 痔 (haemorrhoids) and 屍 (corpse) were removed as a result of public feedback.

==== Criticisms ====
The tōyō kanji list, which was created as a step towards the abolition of kanji, had undergone frequent criticism by scholars. In 1958, Tsuneari Fukuda wrote an article in the magazine Koe pointing out that it was impossible to restrict kanji use, and in 1961, several prominent anti-reformists walked out of the Japanese Language Council general meeting in protest of the dominance of the phoneticists, who were always re-elected to their positions on the council.

The following year, Japanese Language Council member Tomizō Yoshida argued that the council should base their reforms on standardising the current writing system using a mixture of kanji and kana, and in 1965, Morito Tatsuo, the then chairman of the council, announced that the complete abolition of kanji was now inconceivable and that Yoshida's suggestion would become official policy.

==== Modern kana usage ====
On 16 November 1946, historical kana usage underwent official reform to reflect modern pronunciation as gendai kanazukai (現代かなづかい, modern kana usage). In addition, two kana, ゐ/ヰ wi and ゑ/ヱ we, were officially declared obsolete, as the pronunciations they represented had dropped from the language many centuries before.

Some reformers wished to eliminate kanji altogether, and have a phonetic written language only using kana, but this was decided against, and further reforms were halted.

Modern kana usage still has one or two incongruities, as reform was halted at an intermediate stage. On 1 July 1985, the government confirmed that no further reforms would be made in the near future.

- Three particles maintain their historical kana form: the topic marker wa is written は ha instead of わ, the direction marker e is written へ he instead of え and the object marker o is written with the otherwise archaic kana を wo instead of お.
- The sounds ji and zu are usually written with the kana じ and ず respectively, with two exceptions. In compound words of Japanese origin where the second element normally begins chi or tsu and is voiced in the compound, the kana ぢ and づ are used instead. For example, 鼻血 hanaji (nose bleed) consists of 鼻 hana (nose) and 血 chi (blood). As chi is written using the kana ち, hanaji is written はなぢ, adding a dakuten to the original kana to indicate that it is voiced. This is a form of morpho-phonemic orthography, to indicate that it comes from voicing a ち rather than voicing a し or being an unrelated じ.
- ぢ and づ are also used in words of Japanese origin if the preceding kana is the unvoiced form of the same character. For example, the words つづく (続く) and ちぢむ (縮む) are written in this manner, though the correct kana usage for chijimi (the Japanese word for the Korean dish buchimgae) is チジミ, as opposed to チヂミ, as the word is not native to the language.
- ぢ and づ are never used for words of Chinese origin. The character 通 is usually read tsū, but in compounds it may be read as zū (for instance, 融通 yūzū (flexibility) is written ゆうずう) with no regard to its usual pronunciation.

=== Reintroduction of older kanji in mass media ===
When reporting the lawsuits regarding cases of Minamata disease in 1970, the non-tōyō kanji 怨 on, "grudge", was used to refer to the feelings of the bereaved families. As a result of this widespread coverage, this kanji was reintroduced into popular usage, which opened the door for many more kanji to be rehabilitated.

=== Jōyō kanji and the Japanese Industrial Standards ===
The jōyō kanji list, consisting at that time of 1,945 characters, was published by the Japanese government in 1981 to serve as a replacement for the tōyō kanji list. This newer list was based on the older tōyō kanji list, though jōyō kanji was more of a guide to kanji usage while tōyō kanji was created to gradually eliminate kanji usage.

Around the same time, the Japanese Industrial Standards Committee (JIS) also attempted to create a standardised kanji character set for use in computing and word processing, and to assign a unique character code to each kanji for data processing. This character set was, like the jōyō kanji, merely a subset of the thousands of documented kanji, and became known colloquially as the JIS kanji set. The character set has undergone several revisions since its inception. The first of these, officially known as JIS C 6226, or more commonly as the old JIS kanji set, was published in 1978 and contained 6802 characters. After the creation of the jōyō kanji list in 1983, the old set was expanded to contain 6877 characters, including some non-kanji characters. This is known as the new JIS kanji set, and was designated as JIS X 0208 in 1987.

Approximately 200 characters were changed from their traditional form to their simplified form in the change from the old JIS to the new JIS set, meaning that documents written on computers using the old character set would not display the same characters when displayed on a computer that used the new character set.

The JIS character set makes no distinction between the forms of characters, so it is not possible to distinguish between traditional and simplified forms. However, some characters, such as 剣, 劒, and 劍, are distinguished within the character set, despite being variations of the same character.

=== Gaiji ===
Increased use of kana to kanji conversion on word processors and computers during the mid-1980s brought drastic changes to the amount of Japanese written by hand. As a result, the use of kanji outside the jōyō kanji increased, reversing the prior trend of using fewer kanji. These characters were called gaiji (lit. "outside characters").

The preface to the Japanese Language Council internal report on the jōyō kanji states that the council's decision on the forms of characters not on the approved list is pending, and will await research from each field. The new JIS character set extends kanji simplification to gaiji, creating a discrepancy between the standard forms of characters used in literature and materials produced on a computer or word processor. There is pressure for the Japanese publishing industry to adopt the new JIS character set abbreviations, and the resulting variation in gaiji led the Japanese Language Council, in their final report in December 2000, to produce a list of standard forms for many of these kanji to be used as a guideline. This list is called the Hyōgai kanji jitai-hyō (表外漢字字体表; lit. "Non-listed kanji form list") in Japan.

This list was compiled by researching the various gaiji forms used in printed materials, and 1022 major characters were given standard forms to be used in print type face. 22 of these characters were simplified common forms, and the abbreviated forms of three radicals were acknowledged as permissible alternatives for these characters. However, the general policy of the list was to use traditional forms for all gaiji.

Though newspaper publishers had been firm advocates for reducing the number of kanji, the release of the gaiji list forced them to reduce mazegaki in newspaper print. Subsequent issues of the Kisha handobukku shinbun yōji yōgo shū (記者ハンドブック 新聞用字用語集; lit. 'Journalist handbook of newspaper character usage') tended to increase the number of permissible characters, so that former mazegaki words could be written as kanji (for example, the use of 拉致 in place of ら致 or 危惧 in place of 危ぐ). As newspapers began to use computerised typesetting, some newspapers reintroduced ruby characters to indicate the reading of uncommon kanji. Though not a unified movement, there was a general trend towards increased kanji use. Other mass media organizations followed suit, and the NHK shin yōji yōgo jiten (NHK 新用字用語辞典; lit. NHK's dictionary of new character usage) also reduced the amount of mazegaki used.

There were substantial discrepancies between the gaiji list and JIS forms, but these discrepancies were corrected in 2004 with the release of JIS X 0213, which brought the JIS in line with the Japanese Language Council. The changes in jinmeiyō kanji made by the Ministry of Justice during the same year also conformed to this standard printed form, with 芦 being an exception. Computers have also moved towards a standard form following the printed character forms. However, JIS X 0213 subsumes personal place names and other proper nouns that were excluded from the gaiji list, so confusion may still result for characters like 辻, where the character form differs between the printed standard and naming standard.

Jōyō kanji and jinmeiyō kanji (list as of 2000) were not included on the gaiji list, so the standards for those characters are the forms used in the jinmeiyō kanji list. Similarly, 曙 and 蓮, which were added to the jinmeiyō kanji list in 1990, remain the standard forms for the same reason, even though traditional forms exist for those characters (a dot in the middle of 者 for 曙, and a double-dotted radical for 蓮). These kanji remained unchanged in the alterations made to the list in 2004. On the other hand, the characters 堵 and 逢, which were added to the jinmeiyō kanji list in 2004, do have a standard printed form with a dot in the middle of 者 and two dots on the radical, and were amended accordingly in JIS X 0213.

== Historical advocates for reform ==
The use of kanji as part of Japanese orthography has been a matter of debate since at least the end of the Edo period. The use of kanji has been criticised for various reasons, the main criticisms being:

- There are too many kanji, and it is difficult to remember how to read and write them.
- The Latin alphabet is used internationally, and using kanji separates Japan from the rest of the world. This argument was used from a technical point of view after the appearance of the typewriter and computer.
- Processing kanji is more time-consuming on word processors and computers.
- Text that uses kanji generally requires kanji conversion, which is inefficient in comparison to text that only uses kana or rōmaji.

These criticisms led to arguments that reduction or eradication of kanji was a matter of national interest. The idea of abolishing kanji is often referenced to Maejima Hisoka's report titled Kanji onhaishi no gi (漢字御廃止之議; lit. "The argument for the abolition of kanji"), which was submitted to the shōgun Tokugawa Yoshinobu in 1866. The report argued that kanji should be abolished because the process of learning kanji was inefficient; however, in recent years the existence of this report has come into question. Other advocates of kanji reform include the following:

- Kamo no Mabuchi, Kokuikō (国意考)

Critical of the number of kanji, and argued that kana were more convenient because they were phonetic characters like the alphabet. Notes that a French dictionary was written using only 50 characters, and that Dutch uses only 25 characters.

- Motoori Norinaga, Tamakatsuma (玉勝間)
- Fukuzawa Yukichi, Moji no Oshie (文字之教; lit. 'The teaching of characters') (1873)
- Maejima Hisoka, Kanji Onhaishi no Gi (漢字御廃止之儀; lit. 'The argument for the abolition of kanji') (1866)
- Nishi Amane, Yōji o motte kokugo o shosuru no ron (洋字ヲ以テ国語ヲ書スルノ論; lit. "Argument for writing Japanese in western script") (advocating the use of rōmaji)
- Suematsu Kenchō, Nihon Bunshōron (日本文章論; lit. 'Japanese syntax') (1886)
- Ueda Kazutoshi
- Mori Arinori, Nihon no Kyōiku (日本の教育; lit. 'Japanese education') (Advocating the use of English)
- Nanbu Yoshikazu (Advocated the use of rōmaji)
- Baba Tatsui, Nihongo Bunten (日本語文典; lit. 'Japanese grammar')
- Shiga Naoya, Kokugo Mondai (国語問題; lit. 'The language problem') (Advocating the use of French) (Kaizō magazine, April, 1946)

The romaji issue is still occasionally pushed by fringe writers, for example the 2011 book "Kanji is the ruin of Japanese" (漢字が日本語をほろぼす, Kanji ga Nihongo wo horobosu) by Katsuhiko Tanaka (田中克彦).

== Current issues ==
=== Character-related issues ===
Current opinion favors the inclusion of the character 碍 under the Jōyō Kanji list in order to promote the more positive word for handicapped person, 障碍者, because the current word for handicapped, 障害者, uses the character 害, which means “damage” or “harm” (invoking pity) and has a secondary derogatory meaning of "harm or evil influence".

=== Mazegaki ===
The current issue of mazegaki, mixing kanji and kana to write a single word, originated with the modern reforms, particularly the introduction of the tōyō kanji list. Though the intention was to allow words requiring characters that were not included on the list to be substituted with a suitable synonym, in reality, the rule was circumvented by writing these kanji in kana and making mazegaki commonplace. Foods commonly written either just in kana or in mazegaki include 醤油／しょう油 (shōyu, soy sauce) and 味噌 (miso). Other words commonly written as mazegaki include 改ざん, 破たん, 隠ぺい, 漏えい, 覚せい剤, and 団らん where the traditional forms are 改竄, 破綻, 隠蔽, 漏洩, 覚醒剤, and 団欒 respectively. Note that in some cases the unused kanji is very complicated (欒 has 23 strokes), while in other cases the character may be relatively simple but not on the official list (e.g. 洩 has only 9 strokes). This is also common for medical terms, which often use rare kanji, as in 骨粗しょう症 for 骨粗鬆症.

Mazegaki is not enforced and is rarely used in literature, where traditional forms are often used, although it is common in media outlets such as newspapers and television broadcasts, since non-Jōyō kanji are not supposed to be used in these contexts. In extreme cases, jōyō kanji may be written in this way in television programmes or manga aimed at younger children or language learners – for example 哺乳類 (honyūrui "mammal") as ほ乳類. Mazegaki may also be used in signs, possibly as katakana – for example, 皮膚科 (hifuka dermatologist) may be written as 皮フ科 to improve legibility from a distance.

At the time of the introduction of the tōyō kanji list, the use of ruby characters, also known as furigana, led to high printing costs for newspaper companies due to difficulties in typesetting, and mazegaki eliminated the need for furigana. The resulting reduction in printing costs caused the restriction or abolition of kanji to give serious economic advantages to newspaper companies, and they became heavily involved in decisions made by the Japanese Language Council.

=== Kakikae ===
The use of common kanji in place of uncommon ones with the same reading is known as kakikae ("changed writing"). One of the most common examples is the use of 才 instead of 歳, both pronounced sai, when writing ages, as in 10才 rather than 10歳. Another common example is 抽籤 chūsen (lottery), which is often written as 抽選, in addition to the mazegaki 抽せん mentioned above. A rarer example is the word 沈澱 chinden 'settlement (of sediment)', which is a combination of the characters 沈 'to sink' and 澱 'sediment', so the meaning is evident from the kanji. However, in modern writing the uncommon character 澱 has been substituted with 殿 'Mr, lord' (omitting the 3-stroke water radical on the left), a similar character with the same pronunciation but a different meaning, yielding the combination 沈殿, which could now be construed to mean 'sinking lord'.

Various hybrid simplifications also exist, using simpler non-standard characters. This is generally used in handwriting instead of print, and these characters are known as ryakuji ("abbreviated characters"). For example, replacing 闘 with 斗, both pronounced to, is kakikae, as these are both standard characters, but replacing 闘 with the non-standard character 閗 (⿵門斗: 斗 contained in 門) is a ryakuji.

=== Controversy ===
Advocates of the method explain that it makes content easier to read and will attract a wider audience, while critics argue that it is sloppy and erodes traditional culture. Further, mazegaki is criticized because the Japanese script, not using spaces, makes determining word boundaries difficult, an issue largely circumvented by writing most content words in kanji. Thus it is not immediately clear whether hiragana (or katakana) adjacent to kanji are part of the same word, okurigana, or a different word entirely.

As they are phonetic substitutions, one of the problems with using mazegaki and kakikae is that the original meaning of the word is not clear from the characters. Kanji have both sound and meaning (and both can come in two variants: an on'yomi reading based on an approximation of its original Classical Chinese pronunciation, and a kun'yomi reading based on a native Japanese translation of the Classical Chinese word), and most compounds are created by combining both (ateji usually use only sound, and jukujikun usually use only meaning, however). For example, 破たん hatan means "financial/systemic breakdown" or "tear/split (in clothing)" (the latter being an archaic usage). The 破 portion means "to rip" (not necessarily in relation to clothing), "to break", and "to defeat", which are terms that are reflected by its kun'yomi readings and many of the terms it is compounded into, none of which are pronounced [ha]; its on'yomi reading is [ha], and on its own without additional syllables and kana can mean "the middle section of a specific genre of song"; the kana portion たん is tan and can mean "phlegm", "simple", or "sigh", terms that aren't related to tears, cloth, or physical ruin .

Although there are some examples where kakikae uses a simpler character with a similar or related meaning and is generally not criticized, for the most part the substitutions have been purely phonetic and the practices of mazegaki and kakikae have been criticised for legitimising sloppy Japanese and eroding part of Japanese culture.

=== Variant characters in Microsoft Windows ===
In 2005, Microsoft announced that the fonts Meiryo, MS Gothic, and MS Mincho in the Windows Vista operating system would comply with JIS X 0213:2004. Though this removed incompatibilities with the accepted gaiji forms in the Windows environment, it did raise concerns that the characters would be displayed differently depending on the version of Windows system used, re-creating the problems that occurred in the shift from the old to new JIS character set. Microsoft allayed these fears by announcing that the standard Japanese fonts on Vista would be OpenType compatible, and old character forms could also be used by converting between variant forms. In actuality, the Adobe Systems applications InDesign and Illustrator, the JustSystems application Ichitaro, and LibreOffice allow conversion of variant forms in software that have full support for OpenType. However, there are few other applications released for Windows Vista that support OpenType, and Office 2007 does not support conversion of variant kanji forms.

== See also ==
- Historical kana usage
- Asahi characters
- Character encoding

== Bibliography ==
- Suzuki, Yasuyuki. (1977). Kokugo Kanji Mondai no Riron. Mugi shobō, ISBN 978-4-8384-0108-6.
- Takashima, Toshio. Kanji to Nihonjin. Bungeishunjū, ISBN 978-4-16-660198-1.
- Tabei, Fumio.「完璧」はなぜ「完ぺき」と書くのか. Taishukan Shoten, ISBN 978-4-469-22179-4.
- Tsuneari, Fukuda. Watashi no Kokugo kyōshitsu. Bungeishunjū, ISBN 978-4-16-725806-1.
