= Okurigana =

Kana suffixes following kanji stems in Japanese written words

Okurigana (送り仮名; Japanese pronunciation: [okɯɾiɡana], "accompanying letters") are kana suffixes following kanji stems in Japanese written words. They serve two purposes: to inflect adjectives and verbs, and to force a particular kanji to have a specific meaning and be read a certain way. For example, the plain verb form 見る (miru, "see") inflects to past tense 見た (mita, "saw"), where 見 is the kanji stem, and る and た are okurigana, written in hiragana script. With very few exceptions, (Note: Examples of exceptions are the verbs 皮肉る, 牛耳る and 退治る, the る is -る denominative verb suffix.) okurigana are used only with kun'yomi (native Japanese readings), not with on'yomi (Chinese readings), as Chinese morphemes do not inflect in Japanese, (Note: Verbs with Chinese roots are instead formed by appending する (suru, to do), or occasionally variant forms such as -じる (-jiru) (from -ずる, rendaku of -する), and only the する, which is a separate word, inflects.) and their pronunciation is inferred from context, since many are used as parts of compound words (kango).

When used to inflect an adjective or verb, okurigana can indicate aspect (perfective versus imperfective), affirmative or negative meaning, or grammatical politeness, among many other functions. In modern usage, okurigana are almost invariably written with hiragana; katakana were also commonly used in the past.

== English analogues ==
Analogous orthographic conventions find occasional use in English, which, being more familiar, help in understanding okurigana.

As an inflection example, when writing Xing for cross-ing, as in Ped Xing (pedestrian crossing), the -ing is a verb suffix, while cross is the dictionary form of the verb – in this case cross is the reading of the character X, while -ing is analogous to okurigana. By contrast, in the noun Xmas for Christmas, the character Χ is instead read as Christ (it is actually a chi in origin, from the Greek Χριστός, Khristós). The suffixes serve as phonetic complements to indicate which reading to use.

Another common example is in ordinal and cardinal numbers – "1" is read as one, while "1st" is read as fir-st.

Note that word, morpheme (constituent part of word), and reading may be distinct: in "1", "one" is at once the word, the morpheme, and the reading, while in "1st", the word and the morpheme are "first", while the reading is fir, as the -st is written separately, and in "Xmas" the word is "Christmas" while the morphemes are Christ and -mas, and the reading "Christ" coincides with the first morpheme.

== Inflection examples ==
Adjectives in Japanese use okurigana to indicate aspect and affirmation-negation, with all adjectives using the same pattern of suffixes for each case. A simple example uses the character 高 (high) to express the four basic cases of a Japanese adjective. The root meaning of the word is expressed via the kanji (高, read taka and meaning "high" in each of these cases), but crucial information (aspect and negation) can only be understood by reading the okurigana following the kanji stem.

高い (takai)
High (positive, imperfective), meaning "[It is] expensive" or "[It is] high"
高くない (takakunai)
High (negative, imperfective), meaning "[It is] not expensive/high"
高かった (takakatta)
High (positive, perfective), meaning "[It was] expensive/high"
高くなかった (takakunakatta)
High (negative, perfective), meaning "[It was not] expensive/high"

Japanese verbs follow a similar pattern; the root meaning is generally expressed by using one or more kanji at the start of the word, with aspect, negation, grammatical politeness, and other language features expressed by following okurigana.

食べる (taberu)
Eat (positive, imperfective, direct politeness), meaning "[I/you/etc.] eat"
食べない (tabenai)
Eat (negative, imperfective, direct), meaning "[I/you/etc.] do not eat"
食べた (tabeta)
Eat (positive, perfective, direct), meaning "[I/you/etc.] ate/have eaten"
食べなかった (tabenakatta)
Eat (negative, perfective, direct), meaning "[I/you/etc.] did not eat/have not eaten"

Compare the direct polite verb forms to their distant forms, which follow a similar pattern, but whose meaning indicates more distance between the speaker and the listener:

食べます (tabemasu)
Eat (positive, imperfective, distant politeness), meaning "[My group/your group] eats"
食べません (tabemasen)
Eat (negative, imperfective, distant), meaning "[My group/your group] does not eat"
食べました (tabemashita)
Eat (positive, perfective, distant), meaning "[My group/your group] ate/has eaten"
食べませんでした (tabemasen deshita)
Eat (negative, perfective, distant), meaning "[My group/your group] did not eat/has not eaten"

== Disambiguation of kanji ==
Okurigana are also used as phonetic complements to disambiguate kanji that have multiple readings, and consequently multiple meanings. Since kanji, especially the most common ones, can be used for words with many (usually similar) meanings — but different pronunciations — key okurigana placed after the kanji help the reader to know which meaning and reading were intended. Both individual kanji and multi-kanji words may have multiple readings, and okurigana are used in both cases.

Okurigana for disambiguation are a partial gloss, and are required: for example, in 下さる, the stem is 下さ (and does not vary under inflection), and is pronounced くださ (kudasa) – thus 下 corresponds to the reading くだ (kuda), followed by さ (sa), which is written here kuda-sa. Note the okurigana are not considered part of the reading; grammatically the verb is kudasa-ru (verb stem + inflectional suffix), but orthographically the stem itself is analyzed as kuda-sa (kanji reading + okurigana). Compare with furigana, which specify the reading of the kanji, appear outside the line of the text, and which are omitted if understood.

Disambiguation examples include common verbs which use the characters 上 (up) and 下 (down):

上 (a)
上がる (a-garu) "to ascend/to make ready/to complete", and 上げる (a-geru) "to raise, to give (upwards)"
上 (nobo)
上る (nobo-ru) "to go up/to climb (a set of stairs)", and 上す (nobo-su) "serve food, raise a matter (uncommon)" (Note: Do not confuse 上る with its homophone, 登る (both pronounced "noboru"). One meaning of 登る is "to climb (especially with hands and feet)".)
下 (kuda)
下さる (kuda-saru) "to give [to the speaker from a superior]", and 下る (kuda-ru) "to be handed down [intransitive]"
下 (o)
下りる (o-riru) "to get off/to descend" and 下ろす (o-rosu) "to let off (transitive)"
下 (sa)
下がる (sa-garu) "to dangle (intransitive)", and 下げる (sa-geru) "to hang, to lower (transitive)"

Observe that many Japanese verbs come in transitive/intransitive pairs, as illustrated above, and that a single kanji reading is shared between the two verbs, with sufficient okurigana written to reflect changed endings. The above okurigana are as short as possible, given this restriction – note for instance that のぼる (noboru) / のぼす (nobosu) are written as 上る / 上す, not as ×上ぼる or ×上ぼす, while あがる must be written as 上がる to share a kanji reading with 上げる.

Another example includes a common verb with different meanings based on the okurigana:

話す (hana-su)
"to speak/to talk". Example: ちゃんと話す方がいい。 (chanto hanasu hō ga ii), meaning "It's better if you speak correctly."
話し (hana-shi)
noun form of the verb hanasu, "to speak". Example: 話し言葉と書き言葉 (hanashi kotoba to kaki kotoba), meaning "spoken words and written words".
話 (hanashi)
noun, meaning "a story" or "a talk". Example: 話はいかが？ (hanashi wa ikaga?), meaning "How about a story?"

Okurigana are not always sufficient to specify the reading. For example, 怒る (to become angry) can be read as いかる (ika-ru) or おこる (oko-ru) – ×怒かる and ×怒こる are not used (Note: Compare 起こる／起こす (おこる、おこす, o-koru, o-kosu), which does use こ.) – 開く (to open) may be read either as あく (a-ku) or as ひらく (hira-ku) – ×開らく is not used – and 止める may be read either as とめる (to-meru) or as やめる (ya-meru) – ×止る is not used. (Note: 止る is sometimes used for 止まる (とまる, to-maru), the intransitive version of 止める (とめる, to-meru), however.) In such cases the reading must be deduced from context or via furigana.

Ambiguity may be introduced in inflection – even if okurigana specify the reading in the base (dictionary) form of a verb, the inflected form may obscure it. For example, 行く i-ku "go" and 行う okona-u "perform, carry out" are distinct in dictionary form, but in past ("perfective") form become 行った i-tta "went" and 行った okona-tta "performed, carried out" – which reading to use must be deduced from context or furigana. (Note: In this example, the non-standard okurigana 行なう oko-nau is sometimes used for clarity.)

=== 生 ===
One of the most complex examples of okurigana is the kanji 生, pronounced shō or sei in borrowed Chinese vocabulary, which stands for several native Japanese words as well:

- 生 nama 'raw' or ki 'pure/unprocessed'
- 生う o-u 'grow/spring up'
- 生きる i-kiru 'live'
- 生かす i-kasu 'make use of (experience, skills)'
- 生ける i-keru 'arrange (flowers)'
- 生む u-mu 'bear (child)/produce'
- 生まれる/生れる u-mareru/uma-reru 'be born'
- 生える ha-eru 'grow' (intransitive)
- 生やす ha-yasu 'grow' (transitive)

as well as the hybrid Chinese-Japanese words

- 生じる shō-jiru 'occur', which is a modification of
- 生ずる shō-zuru (single character + ずる (rendaku of する))

Note that some of these verbs share a kanji reading (i, u, and ha), and okurigana are conventionally picked to maximize these sharings.

=== Multi-character words ===
Okurigana may also be used in multi-kanji words, where the okurigana specifies the pronunciation of the entire word, not simply the character that they follow; these distinguish multi-kanji native words from kango (borrowed Chinese words) with the same characters. Examples include nouns such as 気配り kikubari "care, consideration" versus 気配 kehai "indication, hint, sign" (note that the reading of 気 changes between ki and ke, despite it not having an okurigana of its own), and verbs, such as 流行る hayaru "be popular, be fashionable", versus 流行 ryūkō "fashion". Note that in this later case, the native verb and the borrowed Chinese word with the same kanji have approximately the same meaning, but are pronounced differently.

Okurigana can also occur in the middle of a compound, such as 落ち葉 ochiba "fallen leaves" and 落葉 rakuyō "fallen leaves, defoliation" – note that the reading of the terminal 葉 changes between ba and yō despite it occurring after the okurigana.

=== Historical suffixes ===
For a few categories of words, okurigana correspond to historical suffixes which are no longer distinct or productive, and the suffix is now fused to the word, but still written in hiragana. This is particularly the case for words which function as adjectives, with notable categories including:

- -shii adjectives, such as 嬉しい ure-shii "happy"
- -yaka na adjectives, such as 賑やか（な） nigi-yaka(na) "bustling, busy"
- -raka na adjectives, such as 明らか（な） aki-raka(na) "clear, obvious"
- -taru adjectives, such as 堂々たる dōdō-taru "magnificent, stately"
- -naru adjectives, such as 単なる tan-naru "mere, simple"

Note that only the -i in -shii inflects; the other kana are invariant, and in practice serve only for disambiguation and to reflect historical grammar. Briefly, -shii adjectives used to be a different class from -i adjectives (distinguished historically as -ku and -shiku adjectives, for present -i and -shii), but have since merged; -yaka and -raka used to be suffixes, but are no longer productive, while -taru and -naru are historical variants of what is now the adjective particle -na. See Japanese adjectives for details.

== Informal rules ==
=== Verbs ===
The okurigana for group I verbs (五段動詞 godan dōshi, also known as u-verbs) usually begin with the final mora of the dictionary form of the verb.

飲む no-mu to drink, 頂く itada-ku to receive, 養う yashina-u to cultivate, 練る ne-ru to twist

For group II verbs (一段動詞 ichidan dōshi, also known as ru-verbs) the okurigana begin at the mora preceding the last, unless the word is only two morae long.

妨げる samata-geru to prevent, 食べる ta-beru to eat, 占める shi-meru to comprise, 寝る ne-ru to sleep, 着る ki-ru to wear

If the verb has different variations, such as transitive and intransitive forms, then the different morae are written in kana, while the common part constitutes a single common kanji reading for all related words.

閉める shi-meru to close (transitive), 閉まる shi-maru to close (intransitive) – in both cases the reading of 閉 is shi.
落ちる o-chiru to fall, 落とす o-tosu to drop – in both cases the reading of 落 is o.

In other cases (different verbs with similar meanings, but which are not strictly variants of each other), the kanji will have different readings, and the okurigana thus also indicate which reading to use.

脅かす obiya-kasu to threaten (mentally), 脅す odo-su to threaten (physically)

=== Adjectives ===
Most adjectives ending in -i (true adjectives) have okurigana starting from the -i.

安い yasu-i, 高い taka-i, 赤い aka-i

Okurigana starts from shi for adjectives ending in -shii (this reflects historical grammar; see above).

楽しい tano-shii, 著しい ichijiru-shii, 貧しい mazu-shii

Exceptions occur when the adjective also has a related verbal form. In this case, as with related verbs (above), the reading of the character is kept constant, and the okurigana are exactly the morae that differ.

暖める atata-meru (verb), 暖かい atata-kai (adjective) – in both cases 暖 is read atata.
頼む tano-mu (verb), 頼もしい tano-moshii (adjective) – in both cases 頼 is read tano.

As with verbs, okurigana are also used to distinguish between readings (unrelated adjectives with the same kanji), in which case the okurigana indicate which reading to use.

細い hoso-i, 細かい koma-kai; 大いに ō-ini, 大きい ō-kii

Na-adjectives (adjectival verbs) that end in -ka have okurigana from the ka.

静か shizu-ka, 確か tashi-ka, 豊か yuta-ka, 愚か oro-ka

=== Adverbs ===
The last mora of an adverb is usually written as okurigana.

既に sude-ni, 必ず kanara-zu, 少し suko-shi

Note that such adverbs are often written in kana, such as 全く matta-ku まったく and 専ら moppa-ra もっぱら.

=== Nouns ===
Nouns do not normally have okurigana.

月 tsuki, 魚 sakana, 米 kome

In some cases the reading is then ambiguous, and must be deduced from context or by furigana.

生 nama or ki
鉄 tetsu or kurogane (tetsu is usual)

However, if the noun is derived from a verb or adjective, it may take the same okurigana, although some may be omitted in certain cases (see below). The derivation may not be apparent if it is old and the verb is no longer in use (see below).

当たり a-tari (from 当たる a-taru), 怒り ika-ri (from 怒る ika-ru), 釣り tsu-ri (from 釣る tsu-ru), 兆し kiza-shi (from 兆す kiza-su)

For some nouns it is obligatory to omit the okurigana, despite having a verbal origin.

話 hanashi (from 話す hana-su), 氷 kōri (from 氷る/凍る kō-ru), 畳 tatami (from 畳む tata-mu)

In these cases, the noun form of the corresponding verb does take okurigana.

話し hana-shi is the nominal form of the verb 話す hana-su, and not the noun 話 hanashi.

Formally, the verbal noun (VN, still retaining verbal characteristics) takes okurigana, as is usual for verbs, while the deverbal noun (DVN, without verbal characteristics) does not take okurigana, as is usual for nouns.

To understand this grammatical distinction, compare the English present participle (verb form ending in -ing, indicating continuous aspect) and the gerund (noun form of the -ing verb form, which is a verbal noun) versus deverbal forms (which are irregular): (Note: Alternatively, compare "converse" (verb) with "conversation" (verbal noun, act of conversing) with "conversation" (deverbal noun, episode noun – the time period), which corresponds with Japanese 話す／話し／話.)

"I am learning Japanese" (verb) and "Learning is fun" (verbal noun) versus the deverbal "Alexandria was a center of learning" (here "learning" is being used as synonymous with "knowledge", rather than an activity)

Similarly, some nouns are derived from verbs, but written with different kanji, in which case no okurigana are used.

堀 hori moat, from 掘り hori (nominal form of 掘る horu to dig)

In other cases a kanji may be derived from another verb or verb combination and retain the okurigana:

幸せ shiawa-se from 仕合せ shi-awa-se

Some okurigana come from Old Japanese, and the underlying verb is no longer in use.

幸い saiwa-i from earlier saihahi
勢い ikio-i from 勢ふ ikio-fu (compare 勢 sei)

Note that these -i suffixes are not i-adjectives – they are the ends of verb stems.

=== Compounds ===
In compounds, okurigana may be omitted if there is no ambiguity in meaning or reading – in other words, if that compound is only read a single way. If okurigana occur after several characters (esp. both in the middle of the compound and at the end of the compound, as in 2-character compounds), either only the middle okurigana, or both the middle and the final okurigana may be omitted; omitting only the final okurigana but retaining the middle okurigana is rather unusual and somewhat questionable, though not unknown (marked with “?” below).

受け付け u-ke tsu-ke, 受付け uke tsu-ke, ?受け付 ?u-ke tsuke, 受付 uke tsuke
行き先 i-ki saki, 行先 iki saki

This is particularly done for Japanese compound verbs (the okurigana inflection of the first, main verb is dropped), as above. This is especially common in reducing or removing kana in formulaic constructions, particularly in signs. For example, in the common phrase 立入禁止 (tachi-iri kin-shi, Do not enter; literally, entry prohibited) in analyzed as 立ち入り + 禁止, but the okurigana are usually dropped.

If the compound is unfamiliar to the reader, there is the risk of it being incorrectly read with on readings, rather than the kun readings – for example, 乗入禁止 "drive-in forbidden" is read nori-ire-kin-shi (乗り入れ禁止) – the first two characters are a compound verb – but an unfamiliar reader may guess jōnyū-kinshi based on the on readings. However, this is not a problem with familiar compounds, whose reading is already known.

Okurigana are avoided in compounds where the reading cannot easily be analyzed into readings of the individual characters, as these are confusing – the reading simply must be learnt separately. These include especially ateji and gikun, as well as cases where a compound word has changed pronunciation over the years, and is no longer a simple combination of the compounds. For example, 息吹 i-buki "breath" is specifically prescribed to not have okurigana – there is the related verb 息吹く i-bu-ku "to breathe", which must have okurigana for inflection, but 息 is otherwise pronounced iki, so there is the risk of misreading as *iki-buki. This is formalized for the words in the addendum to the Jōyō list in the second category of exceptions, listed below.

=== Exceptions ===
The above rules are guidelines, and there are exceptions and special cases that must be learnt individually: okurigana that has become standard for historical reasons (now obscure or not obvious at a glance) or by convention rather than logic. Compare for instance:

明るい aka-rui – rather than ×明い akaru-i
明かり a-kari (明り aka-ri also acceptable)

These both originally derived from the verb 明る aka-ru, which is no longer in use; the first is an irregularly derived i-adjective, while the latter is a deverbal noun. Compare 明く a-ku and 明らか aki-raka.

== Formal rules ==
The Japanese Ministry of Education (MEXT) prescribes rules on how to use okurigana, giving standardized Japanese orthography. The original notification (see references) is from 1973, but it was amended in 1981 when the jōyō kanji table was issued.

The rules apply to kun'yomi (native Japanese readings) of kanji in the jōyō kanji table; they do not apply to kanji outside the jōyō kanji table, or kanji without kun'yomi (with only on'yomi, Chinese readings). The notification gives 7 general rules (通則) and 2 rules for difficult cases (付表の語) in the jōyō kanji table's word list attachment (付表). The first 2 rules (1 & 2) address words that conjugate, the next 3 rules (3–5) address words that do not conjugate, and the last 2 rules (6 & 7) address compound words. Whenever there's doubt whether something is permissible use (許容) or not, the general rule (通則) is to be followed. In some cases, variations are permitted, when there is no danger of confusion; in other case, when there is danger of confusion, variations are not permitted.

Scope:

- The notification provides the basis for okurigana usage in laws, official documents, newspapers, magazines, broadcasts, and similar places where modern Japanese is written using the readings given in the jōyō kanji table.
- The notification does not attempt to regulate the use of okurigana in science, technology, art, and other special fields or in writing of individuals.
- The notification does not apply to proper nouns or kanji used as symbols.
- Okurigana are not used for on readings, and they are not mentioned in the rules except where necessary.

Examples for each rule, with permitted variations:

- The 1981 Cabinet notification prescribes (通則1) the okurigana usage 書く (for 書 read as かく) and 賢い (for 賢 read as かしこい).

This rule states that one needs to write (at least) the part of the word that changes under inflection – the last mora.

- The 1981 Cabinet notification prescribes (通則1) the okurigana usage 行う (for 行 read as おこなう), but 行なう is also explicitly permitted (通則1許容).
- The 1981 Cabinet notification prescribes (通則2) the okurigana usage 交わる (for 交 read as まじわる). ×交る is not allowed by the rules, because it could be mistaken for 交じる (まじる).

In Japanese, there are many pairs of transitive/intransitive verbs, some of which differ in the last mora, other of which differ in the second to last mora, as in this example. This is the case illustrated here in 通則2, though the rule also addresses other points.

- The 1981 Cabinet notification prescribes (通則2) the okurigana usage 終わる (for 終 read as おわる), but 終る is permitted (通則2許容) because there's no fear of it being misread.
- The 1981 Cabinet notification prescribes (通則3) the okurigana usage 花.
- The 1981 Cabinet notification prescribes (通則4) the okurigana usage 氷.
- The 1981 Cabinet notification prescribes (通則4) the okurigana usage 組. When used as the continuative form of 組む, the form 組み is to be used instead.
- The 1981 Cabinet notification prescribes (通則4) the okurigana usage 答え (for 答 read as こたえ), but 答 is permitted (通則4許容) because there's no fear of it being misread.
- The 1981 Cabinet notification prescribes (通則5) the okurigana usage 大いに.
- The 1981 Cabinet notification prescribes (通則6) the okurigana usage 申し込む (for もうしこむ), but 申込む is permitted (通則6許容) because there's no fear of it being misread.
- The 1981 Cabinet notification prescribes (通則6) the okurigana usage 引き換え (for ひきかえ), but 引換え and 引換 are permitted (通則6許容) because there's no fear of their being misread.
- The 1981 Cabinet notification prescribes (通則6) the okurigana usage 次々 (iteration mark), but 休み休み (no iteration mark if okurigana are present).
- The 1981 Cabinet notification prescribes (通則7) the okurigana usage 身分.
- The 1981 Cabinet notification prescribes (付表の語1) the okurigana usage 手伝う.
- The 1981 Cabinet notification prescribes (付表の語2) the okurigana usage 名残.

=== Special cases ===
There are 16 special cases listed, 7 where okurigana are required or recommended, 9 where it is forbidden. These refer to prescribed spellings of words on the attachment to the Jōyō kanji list.

Required or recommended (acceptable alternatives in parentheses) (付表の語1):

- 浮つく
- お巡りさん
- 差し支える (差支える)
- 五月晴れ (五月晴)
- 立ち退く (立退く)
- 手伝う
- 最寄り

Forbidden (付表の語2):

- 息吹 i-buki
- 桟敷 sa-jiki
- 時雨 shigure
- 築山 tsuki-yama (avoid confusion with 築き kizu-ki)
- 名残 na-gori (avoid confusion with 残り noko-ri)
- 雪崩 nadare (avoid confusion with 崩れ kuzu-re)
- 吹雪 fubuki
- 迷子 mai-go (avoid confusion with 迷い mayo-i)
- 行方 yuku-e

== Issues ==
=== Variation ===
While MEXT prescribes rules and permitted variations, in practice there is much variation – permitted or not – particularly in older texts (prior to guidelines) and online – note that these rules are not prescriptive for personal writings, but only in official documents and media. As an example, the standard spelling of the word kuregata is 暮れ方, but it will sometimes be seen as 暮方.

=== Sound change ===
While okurigana are sufficient to show inflection of adjectives and verbs, in rare cases further sound change occurs that affects the stem, and must be inferred from the okurigana, without being explicitly written. An everyday example is o-hayo-u (お早う; Good day), where the stem would normally be pronounced haya (はや), as this comes from the i-adjective haya-i (早い; early) – the a → o sound change must be inferred from the following -u. This sound change is due to this being a polite adjective form.

If there is additional non-inflectional okurigana, then these are change, and this is sufficient to show the sound change in the spelling. This occurs for adjectives ending in -shii, like ure-shii (嬉しい; happy), hence ure-shū (嬉しゅう). A basic example other than -shii of such okurigana use is ō-kyū (大きゅう), from ō-kii (大きい; big).

=== Confusion with compounds ===
There is a risk of confusion of okurigana with compounds: some Japanese words are traditionally written with kanji, but today some of these kanji are hyōgaiji (uncommon characters), and hence are often written as a mixture of kanji and kana, the uncommon characters being replaced by kana; this is known as mazegaki. The resulting orthography is seen by some as confusing and unsightly, particularly if it is the second character that is written in kana – the kana characters are where okurigana would be expected to go – and this is one motivation for expansions of kanji lists. For example, until the 2010 expansion of the jōyō kanji, the word kanpeki (perfect) was officially written 完ぺき, not as the compound 完璧, since the character 璧 was not on the official list, and takarakuji (lottery) is officially (and also popularly) written as 宝くじ, not as 宝籤, since the second character is not in the jōyō kanji and is also quite complicated. This is less of an issue when the first kanji is written in kana, as in ヤシ殻 (yashi-kaku, coconut shell), which is formally 椰子殻.

=== Unwritten particles ===
Converse to okurigana, where part of the pronunciation of a word is written after the kanji, in some cases following kana is dropped (or included in the reading of the previous character). This is primarily for the attributive particles 〜の -no (sometimes written in katakana as ノ) and 〜が -ga (sometimes written ヶ or ケ), and is most common in names. For example, the common family name Inoue (I-no-ue Well's top, top of well) is generally written 井上, though if the particle were written it would be 井の上. Similarly, Amagasaki (Ama-ga-saki, Nun's peak) is generally written 尼崎, but can be written 尼ヶ崎, and Sen no Rikyū is written 千利休 (here the particle is between the family and given name). This can sometimes cause ambiguity, as in the Yamanote Line (for a time called the Yamate Line) and the Agatsuma Line (which could be read as Azuma). Particles are considered grammatically separate from the attached word (they are not an inflection), and this is not considered okurigana, despite some superficial similarities.

=== Other affixes ===
Japanese has various affixes, some of which are written in kana and should not be confused with okurigana. Most common are the honorifics, which are generally suffixes, such as 〜さん -san (Mr., Ms.), and bikago (美化語, "beautified language"), such as お〜 and ご〜 as in お茶 (ocha, tea).

== See also ==
- Phono-semantic compound characters, the analogous principle in the autochthonous Chinese script
