= Kanji =

Chinese characters used in Japanese writing

- "Kanji" written in kanji with furigana
- Script type: Logographic
- Period: 5th century AD – present
- Direction: Vertical right-to-left, left-to-right
- Languages: Old Japanese, Kanbun, Japanese, Ryukyuan languages, Hachijō

Related scripts
- Parent systems: Oracle bone script: Seal script; Clerical script; Regular script; Kanji
- Sister systems: Hanja, zhuyin, traditional Chinese, simplified Chinese, chữ Hán, chữ Nôm, Khitan script, Jurchen script, Tangut script, Yi script

ISO 15924
- ISO 15924: Hani (500), Han (Hanzi, Kanji, Hanja)

Unicode
- Unicode alias: Han

Kanji (/ˈkæn.dʒi, ˈkɑːn.-/; Japanese: 漢字, hiragana: かんじ, Katakana: カンジ, pronounced [kaɲdʑiꜜ], 'Han characters') are logographic Chinese characters, historically adapted from Chinese writing scripts, used in the writing of Japanese. They comprised a major part of the Japanese writing system during the time of Old Japanese and are still used today, along with the subsequently derived syllabic (phonographic) scripts of hiragana and katakana. Most Kanji characters have two pronunciations: kun'yomi, based on the sounds of vernacular Japanese, where the Kanji is often phonetically transcribed with furigana; and on'yomi, based on the imitation of the original Middle Chinese sound when it was borrowed from written Chinese. Some Kanji characters were indigenously invented in Japan by constructing character components derived from other Chinese characters.

After the Meiji Restoration, Japan made its own efforts to simplify the Kanji characters, now known as shinjitai (新字体; 'new character form'), by a process similar to China's simplification efforts, with the intention to increase literacy among the general public. Since the 1920s, the Japanese government has published character lists periodically to help direct the education of its citizenry through the myriad Chinese characters that exist. There are nearly 3,000 kanji used in Japanese names and in common communication.

The term kanji is a direct borrowing and phonetic reading (on'yomi) of the Chinese word hanzi (traditional Chinese: 漢字; simplified Chinese: 汉字; pinyin: hànzì), which is one of the formal terms used when referring to Chinese characters. The significant use of Chinese characters in Japan first began to take hold around the 5th century AD and has since had a profound influence in shaping Japanese culture, language, literature, history, and records. Inkstone artifacts at archaeological sites dating back to the earlier Yayoi period were also found to contain Chinese characters.

Although some characters, as used in Japanese and Chinese, have similar meanings and pronunciations, others have meanings or pronunciations that are unique to one language or the other. For example, 誠 means 'honest' in both languages but is pronounced makoto or sei in Japanese, and chéng in Standard Mandarin Chinese. Individual kanji characters and multi-kanji words invented in Japan from Chinese morphemes have been borrowed into Chinese, Korean, and Vietnamese in recent times. These are known as wasei-kango, or Japanese-made Chinese words.

== History ==
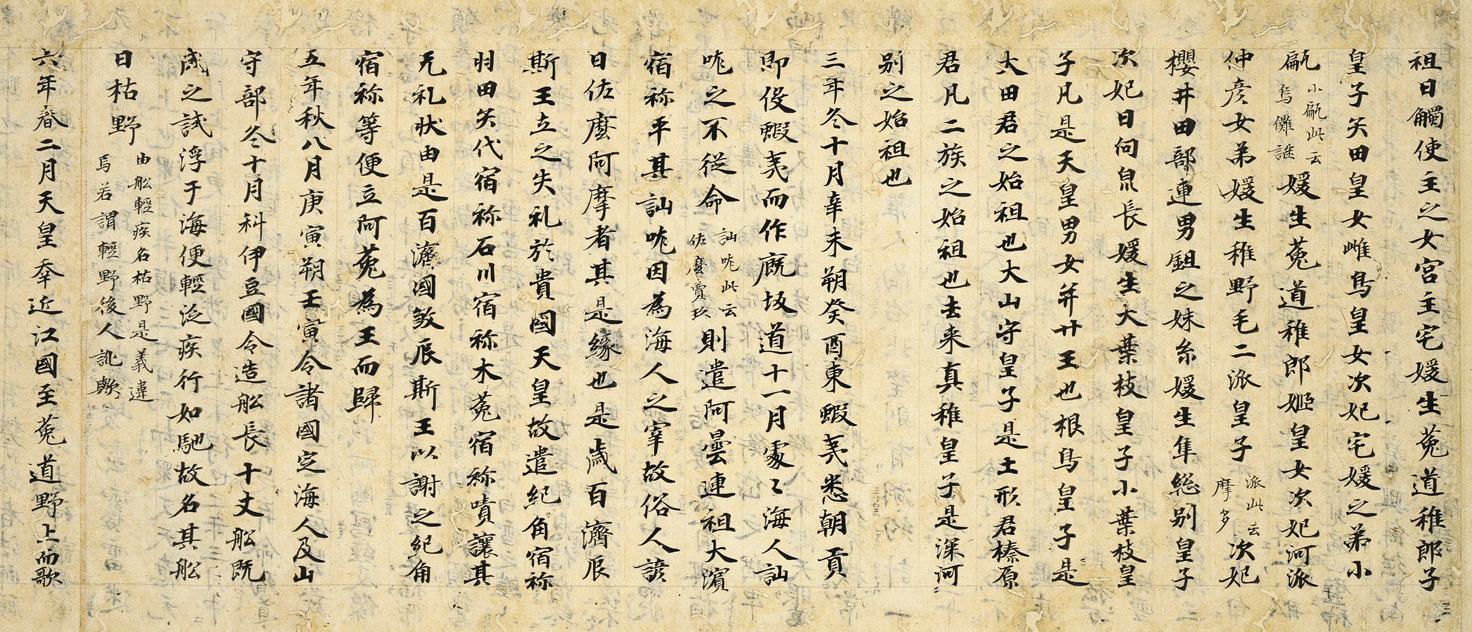
Nihon Shoki (720 AD), considered by historians and archaeologists as the most complete extant historical record of ancient Japan, was written entirely in kanji.

Chinese characters first came to Japan on official seals, letters, swords, coins, mirrors, and other decorative items imported from China. The earliest known instance of such an import was the King of Na gold seal given by Emperor Guangwu of Han to a Wa emissary in 57 AD. Chinese coins as well as inkstones from the first century AD have also been found in Yayoi period archaeological sites. However, the Japanese people of that era probably had little to no comprehension of the script, and they would remain relatively illiterate until the fifth century AD, when writing in Japan became more widespread. According to the Nihon Shoki and Kojiki, a semi-legendary scholar called Wani was dispatched to Japan by the Kingdom of Baekje during the reign of Emperor Ōjin in the early fifth century, bringing with him knowledge of Confucianism and Chinese characters.

The earliest Japanese documents were probably written by bilingual Chinese or Korean officials employed at the Yamato court. For example, the diplomatic correspondence from King Bu of Wa to Emperor Shun of Liu Song in 478 AD has been praised for its skillful use of allusion. Later, groups of people called fuhito were organized under the monarch to read and write Classical Chinese. During the reign of Empress Suiko (593–628), the Yamato court began sending full-scale diplomatic missions to China, which resulted in a large increase in Chinese literacy at the Japanese court.

In ancient times, paper was so rare that people wrote kanji onto thin, rectangular strips of wood, called mokkan (木簡). These wooden boards were used for communication between government offices, tags for goods transported between various countries, and the practice of writing. The oldest written kanji in Japan discovered so far were written in ink on wood as a wooden strip dated to the 7th century, a record of trading for cloth and salt.

The Japanese language had no written form at the time Chinese characters were introduced, and texts were written and read only in Chinese. Later, during the Heian period (794–1185), a system known as kanbun emerged, which involved using Chinese text with diacritical marks to allow Japanese speakers to read Chinese sentences and restructure them into Japanese on the fly, by changing word order and adding particles and verb endings, in accordance with the rules of Japanese grammar. This was essentially a kind of codified sight translation.

Chinese characters also came to be used to write texts in the vernacular Japanese language, resulting in the modern kana syllabaries. Around 650 AD, a writing system called man'yōgana (used in the ancient poetry anthology Man'yōshū) evolved that used a number of Chinese characters for their sound, rather than for their meaning. Man'yōgana written in cursive style evolved into hiragana (literally "fluttering kana" in reference to the motion of the brush during cursive writing), or onna-de, that is, "ladies' hand", a writing system that was accessible to women (who were denied higher education). Major works of Heian-era literature by women were written in hiragana. Katakana (literally "partial kana", in reference to the practice of using a part of a kanji character) emerged via a parallel path: monastery students simplified man'yōgana to a single constituent element. Thus the two other writing systems, hiragana and katakana, referred to collectively as kana, are descended from kanji. In contrast with kana (仮名, literally "borrowed name", in reference to the character being "borrowed" as a label for its sound), kanji are also called mana (真名, literally "true name", in reference to the character being used as a label for its meaning).

In modern Japanese, kanji are used to write certain words or parts of words (usually content words such as nouns, adjective stems, and verb stems), while hiragana are used to write inflected verb and adjective endings, phonetic complements to disambiguate readings (okurigana), particles, and miscellaneous words which have no kanji or whose kanji are considered obscure or too difficult to read or remember. Katakana are mostly used for representing onomatopoeia, non-Japanese loanwords (except those borrowed from ancient Chinese), the names of plants and animals (with exceptions), and for emphasis on certain words.

== Orthographic reform and lists of kanji ==
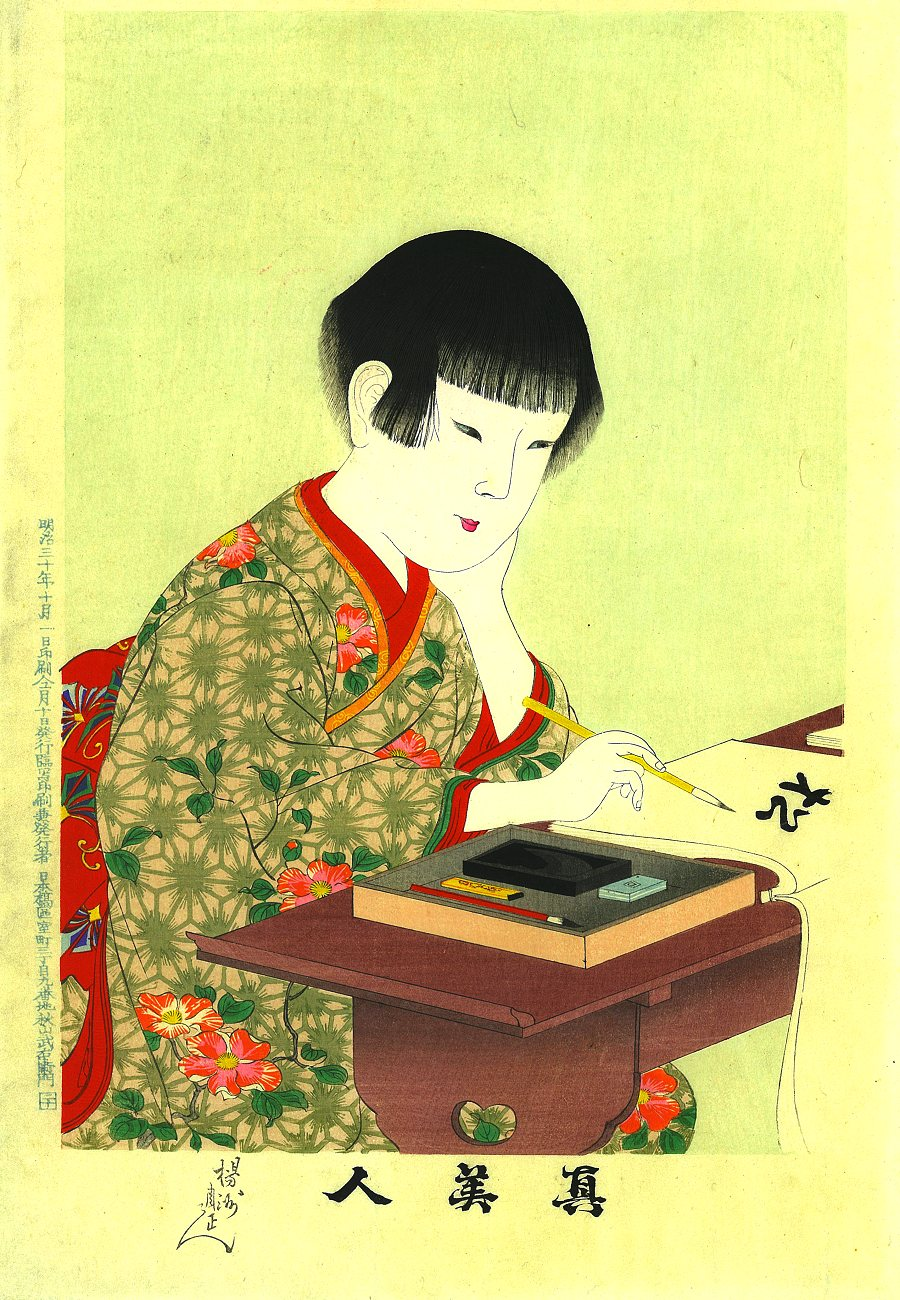
A young woman practicing kanji. Ukiyo-e woodblock print by Yōshū Chikanobu, 1897.

Since ancient times, there has been a strong opinion in Japan that kanji is the orthodox form of writing, but others have argued against it. Kamo no Mabuchi, a scholar of the Edo period, criticized the large number of characters in kanji. He also appreciated the small number of characters in kana characters and argued for the limitation of kanji.

After the Meiji Restoration and as Japan entered an era of active exchange with foreign countries, the need for script reform in Japan began to be called for. Some scholars argued for the abolition of kanji and the writing of Japanese using only kana or Latin characters. These views were not widespread.

However, the need to limit the number of kanji characters was understood, and in May 1923, the Japanese government announced 1,962 kanji characters for regular use. In 1940, the Japanese Army decided on the "Table of Restricted Kanji for Weapons Names" (兵器名称用制限漢字表, heiki meishō yō seigen kanji hyō) which limited the number of kanji that could be used for weapons names to 1,235. In 1942, the National Language Council announced the "Standard Kanji Table" (標準漢字表, hyōjun kanji-hyō) with a total of 2,528 characters, showing the standard for kanji used by ministries and agencies and in general society.

In 1946, after World War II and under the Allied occupation of Japan, the Japanese government, guided by the Supreme Commander of the Allied Powers, instituted a series of orthographic reforms, to help children learn and to simplify kanji use in literature and periodicals.

The number of characters in circulation was reduced, and formal lists of characters to be learned during each grade of school were established. Some characters were given simplified glyphs, called shinjitai (新字体). Many variant forms of characters and obscure alternatives for common characters were officially discouraged.

These are simply guidelines, so many characters outside these standards are still widely known and commonly used; these are known as hyōgaiji (表外字).

=== Kyōiku kanji ===
The kyōiku kanji (教育漢字; lit. "education kanji") are the 1,026 first kanji characters that Japanese children learn in elementary school, from first grade to sixth grade. The grade-level breakdown is known as the gakunen-betsu kanji haitōhyō (学年別漢字配当表), or the gakushū kanji (学習漢字). This list of kanji is maintained by the Japanese Ministry of Education and prescribes which kanji characters and which kanji readings students should learn for each grade.

=== Jōyō kanji ===
The jōyō kanji (常用漢字; regular-use kanji) are 2,136 characters consisting of all the kyōiku kanji, plus 1,110 additional kanji taught in junior high and high school. In publishing, characters outside this category are often given furigana. The jōyō kanji were introduced in 1981, replacing an older list of 1,850 characters known as the tōyō kanji (当用漢字; general-use kanji), introduced in 1946. Originally numbering 1,945 characters, the jōyō kanji list was expanded to 2,136 in 2010. Some of the new characters were previously jinmeiyō kanji; some are used to write prefecture names: 阪, 熊, 奈, 岡, 鹿, 梨, 阜, 埼, 茨, 栃 and 媛.

=== Jinmeiyō kanji ===
As of September 25, 2017, the jinmeiyō kanji (人名用漢字; kanji for use in personal names) consists of 863 characters. Kanji on this list are mostly used in people's names and some are traditional variants of jōyō kanji. There were only 92 kanji in the original list published in 1952, but new additions have been made frequently. Sometimes the term jinmeiyō kanji refers to all 2,999 kanji from both the jōyō and jinmeiyō lists combined.

=== Hyōgai kanji ===
Hyōgai kanji (表外漢字; "unlisted characters") are any kanji not contained in the jōyō kanji and jinmeiyō kanji lists. These are generally written using traditional characters, but extended shinjitai forms exist.

=== Japanese Industrial Standards for kanji ===
The Japanese Industrial Standards for kanji and kana define character code-points for each kanji and kana, as well as other forms of writing such as the Latin alphabet, Cyrillic script, Greek alphabet, Arabic numerals, etc. for use in information processing. They have had numerous revisions. The current standards are:

- JIS X 0208, the most recent version of the main standard. It has 6,355 kanji.
- JIS X 0212, a supplementary standard containing a further 5,801 kanji. This standard is rarely used, mainly because the common Shift JIS encoding system could not use it. This standard is effectively obsolete.
- JIS X 0213, a further revision which extended the JIS X 0208 set with 3,695 additional kanji, of which 2,743 (all but 952) were in JIS X 0212. The standard is in part designed to be compatible with Shift JIS encoding.
- JIS X 0221:1995, the Japanese version of the ISO 10646/Unicode standard.

==== Gaiji ====
Gaiji (外字; literally "external characters") are kanji that are not represented in existing Japanese encoding systems. These include variant forms of common kanji that need to be represented alongside the more conventional glyph in reference works and can include non-kanji symbols as well.

Gaiji can be either user-defined characters, system-specific characters or third-party add-on products. Both are a problem for information interchange, as the code point used to represent an external character will not be consistent from one computer or operating system to another.

Gaiji were nominally prohibited in JIS X 0208-1997 where the available number of code-points was reduced to only 940. JIS X 0213-2000 used the entire range of code-points previously allocated to gaiji, making them completely unusable. Most desktop and mobile systems have moved to Unicode negating the need for gaiji for most users. Historically, gaiji were used by Japanese mobile service providers for emoji.

Unicode allows for optional encoding of gaiji in private use areas, while Adobe's SING (Smart INdependent Glyphlets) technology allows the creation of customized gaiji.

The Text Encoding Initiative uses a <g> element to encode any non-standard character or glyph, including gaiji. The g stands for gaiji.

== Total number of kanji ==
There is no definitive count of kanji characters, just as there is none of Chinese characters generally. The Dai Kan-Wa Jiten, which is considered to be comprehensive in Japan, contains about 50,000 characters. The Zhonghua Zihai, published in 1994 in China, contains about 85,000 characters, but the majority of them are not in common use in any country, and many are obscure variants or archaic forms.

A list of 2,136 jōyō kanji is regarded as necessary for functional literacy in Japanese. Approximately a thousand more characters are commonly used and readily understood by the majority in Japan and a few thousand more find occasional use, particularly in specialized fields of study but those may be obscure to most out of context. A total of 13,108 characters can be encoded in various Japanese Industrial Standards for kanji.

== Readings ==
Individual kanji may be used to write one or more different words or morphemes, leading to different pronunciations or "readings." The correct reading may be determined by contextual cues (such as whether the character represents part of a compound word versus an independent word), the exact intended meaning of the word, and its position within the sentence. For example, 今日 is mostly read kyō, meaning "today", but in formal writing it is read konnichi, meaning "nowadays". Furigana is used to specify ambiguous readings, such as rare, literary, or otherwise non-standard readings.

Readings are categorized as either kun'yomi (訓読み) (literally "meaning reading"), native Japanese, or on'yomi (音読み) (literally "sound reading"), borrowed from Chinese. Most kanji have at least a single reading of each category, though some have only one, such as kiku (菊; "chrysanthemum", an on-reading) or iwashi (鰯; "sardine", a kun-reading); Japanese-coined kanji (kokuji) often only have kun'yomi readings.

Some common kanji have ten or more possible readings; the most complex common example is 生, which is read as sei, shō, nama, ki, o-u, i-kiru, i-kasu, i-keru, u-mu, u-mareru, ha-eru, and ha-yasu, totaling eight basic readings (the first two are on, while the rest are kun), or 12 if related verbs are counted as distinct.

=== On'yomi (Sino-Japanese reading) ===
The on'yomi (音読み; [oɰ̃jomi], lit. "sound(-based) reading"), the Sino-Japanese reading, is the modern descendant of the Japanese approximation of the base Chinese pronunciation of the character at the time it was introduced. It was often previously referred to as translation reading, as it was recreated readings of the Chinese pronunciation but was not the Chinese pronunciation or reading itself, similar to the English pronunciation of Latin loanwords. There also exist kanji created by the Japanese and given an on'yomi reading despite not being a Chinese-derived or a Chinese-originating character. Some kanji were introduced from different parts of China at different times, and so have multiple on'yomi, and often multiple meanings. Kanji invented in Japan (kokuji) would not normally be expected to have on'yomi, but there are exceptions, such as the character 働 "to work", which has the kun'yomi "hatara(ku)" and the on'yomi "dō", and 腺 "gland", which has only the on'yomi "sen"—in both cases these come from the on'yomi of the phonetic component, respectively 動 "dō" and 泉 "sen".

=== Kun'yomi (native reading) ===
The kun'yomi (訓読み; [kɯɰ̃jomi], lit. "meaning reading"), the native reading, is a reading based on the pronunciation of a native Japanese word, or yamato kotoba, that closely approximated the meaning of the Chinese character when it was introduced. As with on'yomi, there can be multiple kun'yomi for the same kanji, and some kanji have no kun'yomi at all.

=== Ateji ===
Ateji (当て字) are characters used only for their sounds. In this case, pronunciation is still based on a standard reading, or used only for meaning (broadly a form of ateji, narrowly jukujikun). Therefore, only the full compound—not the individual character—has a reading. There are also special cases where the reading is completely different, often based on a historical or traditional reading.

The analogous phenomenon occurs to a much lesser degree in Chinese varieties, where there are literary and colloquial readings of Chinese characters—borrowed readings and native readings. In Chinese these borrowed readings and native readings are etymologically related, since they are between Chinese varieties (which are related), not from Chinese to Japanese (which are not related). They thus form doublets and are generally similar, analogous to different on'yomi, reflecting different stages of Chinese borrowings into Japanese.

=== Gairaigo ===
Longer readings exist for non-Jōyō characters and non-kanji symbols, where a long gairaigo word may be the reading (this is classed as kun'yomi—see single character gairaigo, below)—the character 糎 has the seven kana reading センチメートル senchimētoru "centimeter", though it is generally written as "cm" (with two half-width characters, so occupying one space); another common example is '%' (the percent sign), which has the five kana reading パーセント pāsento.

=== Mixed readings ===
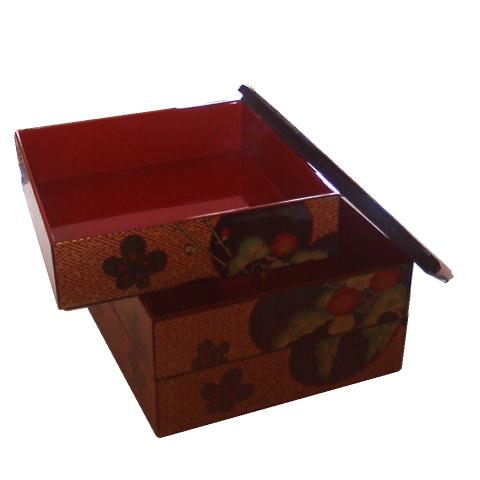
A jūbako (重箱), which has a mixed on-kun reading

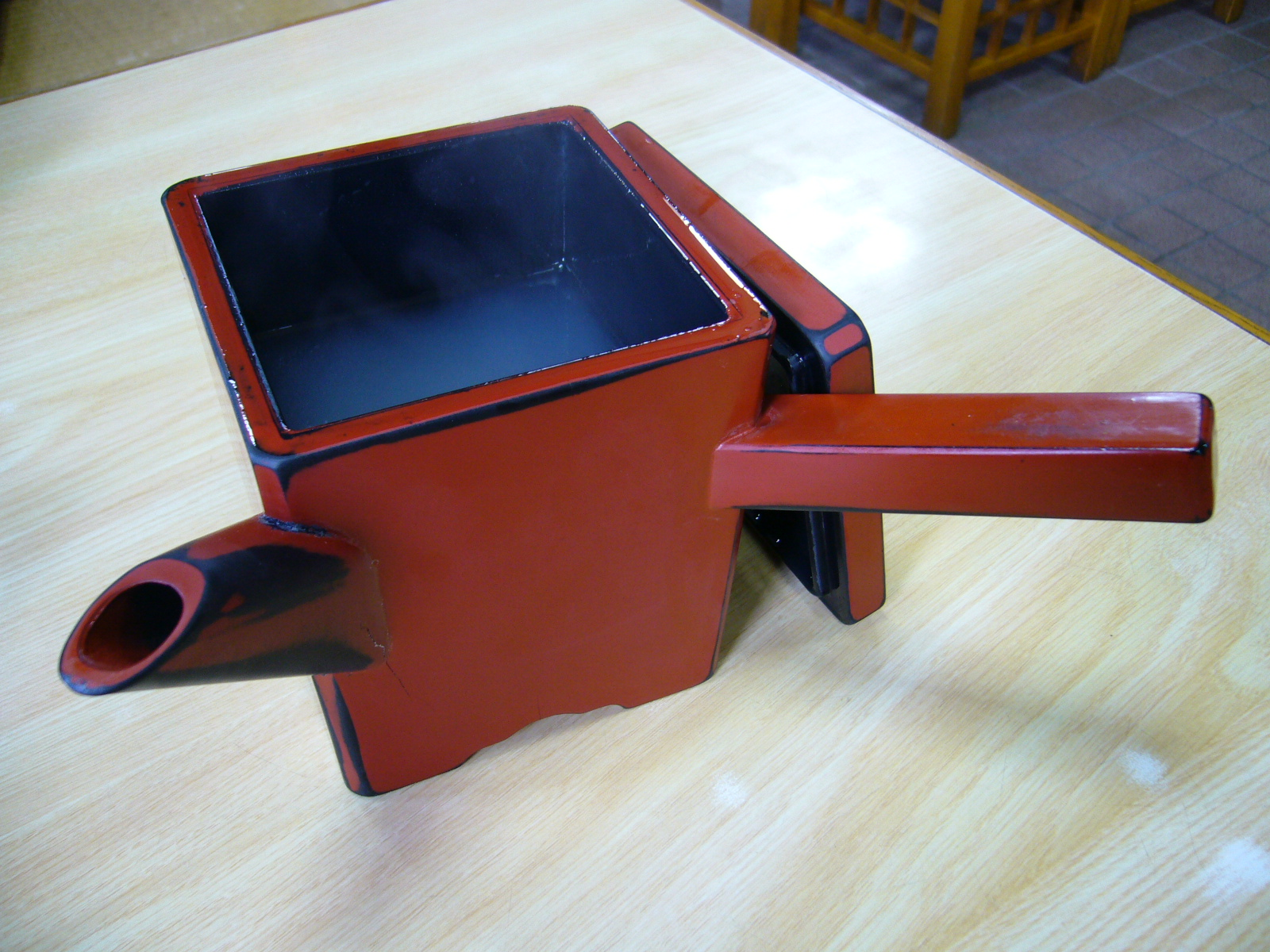
A yutō (湯桶), which has a mixed kun-on reading

There are many kanji compounds that use a mixture of on'yomi and kun'yomi; these may be considered hybrid words. Readings in which the first kanji is on'yomi and the second is kun'yomi are classified as jūbakoyomi (重箱読み; multi-layered food box reading), while kun-on words are classified as yutōyomi (湯桶読み; hot liquid pail reading). The words jūbako and yutō are themselves examples of the reading patterns they represent (they are autological words). Other examples include basho (場所; "place", kun-on), kin'iro (金色; "golden", on-kun) and aikidō (合気道; the martial art Aikido", kun-on-on).

Ateji often use mixed readings. For instance, the city of Sapporo (サッポロ), whose name derives from the Ainu language and has no meaning in Japanese, is written with the on-kun compound 札幌 (sapporo) (which includes sokuon as if it were a purely on compound).

=== Special readings ===
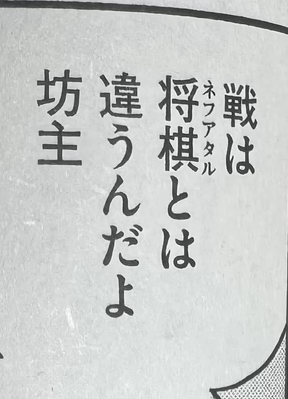
A line of dialogue from the manga Vinland Saga using gikun, the word "ネファタル" (hnefatafl) is written with the kanji for "将棋" (shogi) to clarify for Japanese readers that hnefatafl is a board game similar to shogi.

Gikun (義訓) and jukujikun (熟字訓) are readings of kanji combinations that have no direct correspondence to the characters' individual on'yomi or kun'yomi. From the point of view of the character, rather than the word, this is known as a nankun (難訓; "difficult reading"), and these are listed in kanji dictionaries under the entry for the character.

Gikun are other readings assigned to a character instead of its standard readings. An example is reading 寒 (meaning "cold") as fuyu ("winter") rather than the standard readings samu or kan, and instead of the usual spelling for fuyu of 冬. Another example is using 煙草 (lit. 'smoke grass') with the reading tabako ("tobacco") rather than the otherwise-expected readings of *kemuri-gusa or *ensō. Some of these, such as for tabako, have become lexicalized, but in many cases this kind of use is typically non-standard and employed in specific contexts by individual writers. Aided with furigana, gikun could be used to convey complex literary or poetic effect (especially if the readings contradict the kanji), or clarification if the referent may not be obvious.

Jukujikun are when the standard kanji for a word are related to the meaning, but not the sound. The word is pronounced as a whole, not corresponding to sounds of individual kanji. For example, 今朝 ("this morning") is jukujikun. This word is not read as *ima'asa, the expected kun'yomi of the characters, and only infrequently as konchō, the on'yomi of the characters. The most common reading is kesa, a native bisyllabic Japanese word that may be seen as a single morpheme, or as a compound of ke (“this”, as in kefu, the older reading for 今日, “today”), and asa, “morning”. Likewise, 今日 ("today") is also jukujikun, usually read with the native reading kyō; its on'yomi, konnichi, does occur in certain words and expressions, especially in the broader sense "nowadays" or "current", such as 今日的 ("present-day"), although in the phrase konnichi wa ("good day"), konnichi is typically spelled wholly with hiragana rather than with the kanji 今日.

Jukujikun are primarily used for some native Japanese words, such as 大和 or 倭 (Yamato, the name of the dominant ethnic group of Japan and of a former Japanese province, as well as an ancient name for Japan), and for some old borrowings, such as 柳葉魚 (shishamo, literally "willow leaf fish") from Ainu, 煙草 (tabako, literally “smoke grass”) from Portuguese, or 麦酒 (bīru, literally “wheat alcohol”) from Dutch, especially if the word was borrowed before the Meiji period. Words whose kanji are jukujikun are often usually written as hiragana (if native), or katakana (if borrowed); some old borrowed words are also written as hiragana, especially Portuguese loanwords such as かるた (karuta) from Portuguese "carta" (English "card") or てんぷら (tempura) from Portuguese "tempora" (English “times, season”), as well as たばこ (tabako).

A case where jukujikun is used for Sino-Japanese is the word kyōdai, which, prototypically, means "brothers" and is spelt 兄(きょう)弟(だい) ("big and little brothers"). However, the meaning has been expanded to "siblings" in general, and can assume such spellings as 姉(きょう)妹(だい) ("(big and little) sisters", alternatively pronounced shimai), 兄(きょう)妹(だい) ("big brother and little sister") and 姉(きょう)弟(だい) ("big sister and little brother"). It is also possible to say otoko kyōdai ("male siblings; brothers") and onna kyōdai ("female siblings; sisters").

Sometimes, jukujikun can even have more kanji than there are syllables, examples being kera (啄木鳥, “woodpecker”), gumi (胡頽子, “silver berry, oleaster”), and Hozumi (八月朔日, a surname). This phenomenon is observed in animal names that are shortened and used as suffixes for zoological compound names, for example when 黄金虫, normally read as koganemushi, is shortened to kogane in 黒黄金虫 kurokogane, although zoological names are commonly spelled with katakana rather than with kanji. Outside zoology, this type of shortening only occurs on a handful of words, for example 大元帥 daigen(sui), or the historical male name suffix 右衛門 -emon, which was shortened from the word uemon.

The kanji compound for jukujikun is often idiosyncratic and created for the word, and there is no corresponding Chinese word with that spelling. In other cases, a kanji compound for an existing Chinese word is reused, where the Chinese word and on'yomi may or may not be used in Japanese. For example, 馴鹿 ("reindeer") is jukujikun for tonakai, from Ainu, but the on'yomi reading of junroku is also used. In some cases, Japanese coinages have subsequently been borrowed back into Chinese, such as 鮟鱇 (ankō, "monkfish").

The underlying word for jukujikun is a native Japanese word or foreign borrowing, which either does not have an existing kanji spelling (either kun'yomi or ateji) or for which a new kanji spelling is produced. Most often the word is a noun, which may be a simple noun (not a compound or derived from a verb), or may be a verb form or a fusional pronunciation. For example, the word 相撲 (sumō, "sumo") is originally from the verb 争う (sumau, “to vie, to compete”), while 今日 (kyō, "today") is fusional (from older ke, "this" + fu, "day").

In rare cases, jukujikun is also applied to inflectional words (verbs and adjectives), in which case there is frequently a corresponding Chinese word. The most common example of an inflectional jukujikun is the adjective 可愛い (kawai-i, “cute”), originally kawafayu-i; the word (可愛) is used in Chinese, but the corresponding on'yomi is not used in Japanese. By contrast, "appropriate" can be either 相応しい (fusawa-shii, as jukujikun) or 相応 (sōō, as on'yomi). Which reading to use can be discerned by the presence or absence of the -shii ending (okurigana). A common example of a verb with jukujikun is 流行る (haya-ru, “to spread, to be in vogue”), corresponding to on'yomi 流行 (ryūkō). A sample jukujikun deverbal (noun derived from a verb form) is 強請 (yusuri, "extortion"), from 強請る (yusu-ru, “to extort”), spelling from 強請 (kyōsei, "extortion"). Note that there are also compound verbs and, less commonly, compound adjectives, and while these may have multiple kanji without intervening characters, they are read using the usual kun'yomi. Examples include 面白い (omo-shiro-i, "interesting", literally "face + white") and 狡賢い (zuru-gashiko-i, "sly", lit. "cunning, crafty + clever, smart").

Typographically, the furigana for jukujikun are often written so they are centered across the entire word, or for inflectional words over the entire root—corresponding to the reading being related to the entire word—rather than each part of the word being centered over its corresponding character, as is often done for the usual phono-semantic readings.

=== Single character gairaigo ===
In some rare cases, kanji may have a reading borrowed from a modern foreign language (gairaigo), though usually gairaigo are written in katakana. Notable examples include pēji (頁、ページ; page), botan (釦／鈕、ボタン; button), zero (零、ゼロ; zero), and mētoru (米、メートル; meter). These are classed as kun'yomi, because the character is used for its meaning—the kun'yomi label may sometimes be misleading, since most kun'yomi are native Japanese readings. The readings are also rendered in katakana, unlike the usual hiragana for native kun'yomi. Note that most of these characters are for units, particularly SI units, in many cases using new characters (kokuji) coined during the Meiji period, such as kiromētoru (粁、キロメートル; kilometer, 米 "meter" + 千 "thousand").

=== Nanori ===
Some kanji also have lesser-known readings called nanori (名乗り), which are mostly used for names (often given names) and, in general, are closely related to the kun'yomi. Place names sometimes also use nanori or, occasionally, unique readings not found elsewhere.

=== When to use which reading ===
Although there are general rules for when to use on'yomi and when to use kun'yomi, many kanji have multiple on- or kun-readings, and the language is littered with exceptions; how a character was meant to be read is sometimes ambiguous even to native speakers (this is especially true for names, both of people and places).

A single kanji followed by okurigana (hiragana forming part of a word)—such as the inflectable suffixes forming native verbs and adjectives like 赤い (akai; red) and 見る (miru; to see)—always indicates kun'yomi. Okurigana can indicate which kun'yomi to use, as in 食べる (ta-beru) versus 食う (ku-u), both meaning "(to) eat", but this is not always sufficient, as in 開く, which may be read as a-ku or hira-ku, both meaning "(to) open".

Kanji compounds (jukuji), especially yojijukugo, usually, but not always, use on'yomi, usually (but not always) kan-on. In ge-doku (解毒; detoxification, anti-poison), 解 is read with its kan-on reading instead of its more common go-on reading, kai. Exceptions are common—情報 (jōhō; information), for example, is go-kan. 牛肉 (gyū-niku; beef) and 羊肉 (yō-niku; mutton) have on-on readings, but 豚肉 (buta-niku; pork) and 鶏肉 (tori-niku; poultry) have kun-on readings. Examples of fully kun'yomi compounds include 手紙 (tegami; letter), 日傘 (higasa; parasol), and the infamous 神風 (kamikaze; divine wind). Some kun'yomi compounds have non-inflective okurigana, such as 唐揚げ (karaage; Chinese-style fried chicken) and 折り紙 (origami); many can also be written with the okurigana omitted.

Kanji in isolation are typically read using their kun'yomi; exceptions include the on'yomi 愛 (ai; love), 禅 (Zen), and 点 (ten; mark, dot). Most of these on'yomi cases involve kanji that have no kun'yomi. For kanji with multiple common isolated readings, such as 金, which may be read as kin (gold) or kane (money, metal), only context can determine the intended reading.

The isolated kanji versus compound distinction gives words for similar concepts completely different pronunciations. Alone, 北 (north) and 東 (east) use the kun'yomi kita and higashi, but 北東 (northeast), uses the on'yomi hokutō. Inconsistencies also occur between compounds; 生 is read as sei in 先生 (sensei; teacher) but as shō in 一生 (isshō; one's whole life) (both on'yomi).

Multiple readings have given rise to a number of homographs, in some cases having different meanings depending on how they are read. One example is 上手, which can be read in three different ways: jōzu (skilled), uwate (upper part), or kamite (stage left/house right). In addition, 上手い has the reading umai (skilled). More subtly, 明日 has three different readings, all meaning "tomorrow": ashita (casual), asu (polite), and myōnichi (formal).

Conversely, some terms are homophonous but not homographic, and thus ambiguous in speech but not in writing. To remedy this, alternate readings may be used for confusable words. For example, 私立 (privately established, esp. school) and 市立 (municipal) are both normally pronounced shi-ritsu; in speech these may be distinguished by the alternative pronunciations watakushi-ritsu and ichi-ritsu. More informally, in legal jargon 前文 (preamble) and 全文 (full text) are both pronounced zen-bun, so 前文 may be pronounced mae-bun for clarity, as in "Have you memorized the preamble [not 'whole text'] of the constitution?". As in these examples, this is primarily done using a kun'yomi for one character in a normally on'yomi term.

==== Legalese ====
Certain words take different readings depending on whether the context concerns legal matters or not. For example:

Word	Common reading	Legalese reading
懈怠 ("negligence")	ketai	kaitai
競売 ("auction")	kyōbai	keibai
兄弟姉妹 ("siblings")	kyōdai shimai	keitei shimai
境界 ("metes and bounds")	kyōkai	keikai
競落 ("acquisition at an auction")	kyōraku	keiraku
遺言 ("will")	yuigon	igon
図画 ("imagery")	zuga	toga (Note: Particularly in "obscene imagery" (猥褻図画, waisetsu toga).)

=== Ambiguous readings ===
In some instances where even context cannot easily provide clarity for homophones, alternative readings or mixed readings can be used instead of regular readings to avoid ambiguity. For example:

Ambiguous reading	Disambiguated readings
baishun	baishun (売春; "selling sex", on) kaishun (買春; "buying sex", yutō)
itoko	jūkeitei (従兄弟; "male cousin", on) jūshimai (従姉妹; "female cousin", on) jūkei (従兄; "older male cousin", on) jūshi (従姉; "older female cousin", on) jūtei (従弟; "younger male cousin", on) jūmai (従妹; "younger female cousin", on)
jiten	kotobaten (辞典; "word dictionary", yutō) kototen (事典; "encyclopedia", yutō) mojiten (字典; "character dictionary", irregular, from moji (文字; "character"))
kagaku	kagaku (科学; "science", on) bakegaku (化学; "chemistry", yutō)
karyō	ayamachiryō (過料; "administrative fine", yutō) togaryō (科料; "misdemeanor fine", yutō)
kōshin	Kinoesaru (甲申; "Greater-Wood-Monkey year", kun) Kinoetatsu (甲辰; "Greater-Wood-Dragon year", kun) Kanoesaru (庚申; "Greater-Fire-Monkey year", kun) Kanoetatsu (庚辰; "Greater-Fire-Dragon year", kun)
Shin	Hatashin (秦; "Qin", irregular, from the alternative reading Hata used as a family name) Susumushin (晋; "Jin", irregular, from the alternative reading Susumu used as a personal name)
shiritsu	ichiritsu (市立; "municipal", yutō) watakushiritsu (私立; "private", yutō)

There are also cases where the words are technically heterophones, but they have similar meanings and pronunciations, therefore liable to mishearing and misunderstanding.

Word with an alternative reading	Word that may be confused with
gishu (技手; "assistant engineer", on), alternatively gite, jūbako	gishi (技師; "engineer", on)
shuchō (首長; "chief", on), alternatively kubichō, yutō	shichō (市長; "mayor", on)

=== Different kanji for different meanings ===
In the same ways English dedicates different spellings to different meanings of the same etymological words, such as born/borne, past/passed, flower/flour, discreet/discrete, etc., Japanese also has a few similar cases.

The polysemous adjective yasui [jɑ̈̀sɨ́ì] is spelt with different kanji depending on its meanings: 安い・廉い for "cheap," with the kanji 廉 representing the Chinese word for "cheap;" and 易い for "easy; simple," with 易 representing the Chinese word for "easy; simple." Its more archaic meaning, "calm; at ease; peaceful; at peace; in peace," is preserved in the imperative form 安かれ (yasukare; 'may you/they/it be at peace (alive); may you/they/it rest in peace (dead)'), which explains the kanji 安 which represents the Chinese word for "calm; peaceful."

The adjective atsui [ɑ̈̀t͡sɨ́ì] is spelt as 熱い for tangible things hot to the touch, and as 暑い for hot weather or climate. 熱 and 暑 are distinct words in Chinese, although the former can also be used for hot weather or climate. Atsui (厚い; [ɑ̈̀t͡sɨ́í]) meaning "thick" is unrelated.

The words oji "uncle" and oba "aunt" can be spelt differently depending on the age of the aunt or uncle relative to that of one's parent. If he or she is older than one's parent, the spellings are 伯父 and 伯母; if he or she is younger, they are 叔父 and 叔母. These spellings are taken from Chinese, although 伯母 and 叔母 are specifically the wives of one's paternal uncles rather than just "aunts" as in Japanese.

=== Alteration of spelling with homophonous kanji ===
Sometimes spellings of words may be altered with the homophony of certain kanji.

The kanji 和 (wa, lit. 'harmony'), when used for "Japan," was a replacement of the homophonous 倭 due to its other negative meanings such as "dwarf." For more, see Wa (name of Japan). This homophony only occurs in Japanese, while other languages have different readings for these characters, as in Mandarin hé, Korean 화 (hwa) and Vietnamese hoà/hòa/huề for 和, and wō, 왜 (wae) and oa for 倭.

The kanji 才 (sai) originally means "talent," but due to its simple calligraphy as well as homophony with 歳 (sai), it is often used as a counter for "year of age," although the former has not completely displaced the latter. These characters are not homophonous in other languages, where 才 is cái in Mandarin, 재 (jae) in Korean and tài in Vietnamese, while 歳 is suì, 세 (se) and tuế.

The word for telephone, 電話(機) denwa(ki) in Japanese, is spelt with the Chinese characters for "lightning/electricity," "speech" and "machine" in that order, together literally meaning "electric-speech machine", a homophonous alteration of the original name for the device, 伝話機 (or 傳話機 in kyūjitai), literally "speech-transmitting machine," whereby 伝 meant "transmit." The original spelling was first attested in 1878, two years after the telephone was introduced into Japan, and the later spelling came into competition with it not long after, as shown in an 1885 legislative document which pointed out the inconsistencies in terminology in a bill between 傳話 (with 傳 as in "transmit"), 電話 (with 電 as in "lightning") and even テレボン (terebon, supposedly a misspelling of terehon, an early rendition of the English word telephone). One 1892 English-Japanese dictionary uses the spelling 傳話機 for the "telephone" entry whose definition contains the word "electricity", but 電話機 for the "telephonic" entry right underneath. Ultimately, only 電話 survived and was adapted into Sino-Xenic vocabularies as diànhuà in Mandarin Chinese, 전화 (jeonhwa) in Korean and điện thoại in Vietnamese. Likewise, the word denshin(ki) (電信(機); 'telegraph'; lit. 'electric-signal machine'; earlier 伝信機 lit. 'signal-transmitting machine', first attested in 1860) was adapted as diànxìn, 전신 (jeonsin) and điện tín. Compare denpō (電報; 'telegram'; lit. 'electric information') which has always been spelt as such, adapted as diànbào, 전보 (jeonbo) and điện báo. The homophony between 電 "electricity" and 伝 "transmit" only occurs in Japanese and Korean, but not in Mandarin and Vietnamese, where 電 is diàn and điện, while 伝 is chuán and truyền.

The word kansū ('mathematical function'), a Chinese borrowing, was originally spelt 函数, with the kanji for "box/contain" and "number," thus "containing number," which refers to the fact that functions "contain" variables. (Note: The "box" meaning also happens to match the "black box" schema of a function.) The term is first attested in Dàiwēijī Shíjí (代微積拾級 'Ten Levels of Algebra and Calculus'), a seminal 1859 translation into Chinese of Elias Loomis's Elements of Analytical Geometry and of the Differential and Integral Calculus, resulting from a joint effort between the Chinese mathematician Li Shanlan and the British missionary Alexander Wylie. (Note: Variables were originally notated with 天 ('heaven') and 地 ('earth'), as in 天＝函（地）, equivalent to Loomis's u=f(x).) Due to the nonstandard status of the kanji 函 (kan), homophonous alternatives such as 干 (kan) were proposed, but ultimately 関 (kan, but historically kwan) won out. This homophony only occurs in Japanese, and other languages adopted their own readings of 函 as in Mandarin hánshù, Korean 함수 (hamsu) and Vietnamese hàm số, as opposed to their readings of 関 which are guān, 관 (gwan) and quan.

=== Place names ===
Several famous place names, including those of Japan itself (日本 Nihon or sometimes Nippon), those of some cities such as Tokyo (東京 Tōkyō) and Kyoto (京都 Kyōto), and those of the main islands Honshu (本州 Honshū), Kyushu (九州 Kyūshū), Shikoku (四国 Shikoku), and Hokkaido (北海道 Hokkaidō) are read with on'yomi; however, the majority of Japanese place names are read with kun'yomi: 大阪 Ōsaka, 青森 Aomori, 箱根 Hakone. Names often use characters and readings that are not in common use outside of names. When characters are used as abbreviations of place names, their reading may not match that in the original. The Osaka (大阪) and Kobe (神戸) baseball team, the Hanshin (阪神) Tigers, take their name from the on'yomi of the second kanji of Ōsaka and the first of Kōbe. The name of the Keisei (京成) railway line—linking Tokyo (東京) and Narita (成田)—is formed similarly, although the reading of 京 from 東京 is kei, despite kyō already being an on'yomi in the word Tōkyō.

Japanese family names are also usually read with kun'yomi: 山田 Yamada, 田中 Tanaka, 鈴木 Suzuki. Japanese given names often have very irregular readings. Although they are not typically considered jūbako or yutō, they often contain mixtures of kun'yomi, on'yomi and nanori, such as 大助 Daisuke [on-kun], 夏美 Natsumi [kun-on]. Being chosen at the discretion of the parents, the readings of given names do not follow any set rules, and it is impossible to know with certainty how to read a person's name without independent verification. Parents can be quite creative, and rumors abound of children called 地球 Āsu ("Earth") and 天使 Enjeru ("Angel"); neither are common names, and have normal readings chikyū and tenshi respectively. Some common Japanese names can be written in multiple ways, e.g., Akira can be written as 亮, 彰, 明, 顕, 章, 聴, 光, 晶, 晄, 彬, 昶, 了, 秋良, 明楽, 日日日, 亜紀良, 安喜良 and many other characters and kanji combinations not listed, Satoshi can be written as 聡, 哲, 哲史, 悟, 佐登史, 暁, 訓, 哲士, 哲司, 敏, 諭, 智, 佐登司, 總, 里史, 三十四, 了, 智詞, etc., and Haruka can be written as 遥, 春香, 晴香, 遥香, 春果, 晴夏, 春賀, 春佳, and several other possibilities. Common patterns do exist, however, allowing experienced readers to make a good guess for most names. To alleviate any confusion on how to pronounce the names of other Japanese people, most official Japanese documents require Japanese to write their names in both kana and kanji.

Chinese place names and Chinese personal names appearing in Japanese texts, if spelled in kanji, are almost invariably read with on'yomi. Especially for older and well-known names, the resulting Japanese pronunciation may differ widely from that used by modern Chinese speakers. For example, Mao Zedong's name is pronounced as Mō Takutō (毛沢東) in Japanese, and the name of the legendary Monkey King, Sun Wukong, is pronounced Son Gokū (孫悟空) in Japanese.

Today, Chinese names that are not well known in Japan are often spelled in katakana instead, in a form much more closely approximating the native Chinese pronunciation. Alternatively, they may be written in kanji with katakana furigana. Many such cities have names that come from non-Chinese languages like Mongolian or Manchu. Examples of such not-well-known Chinese names include:

English name	Japanese name		
English name	Rōmaji	Katakana	Kanji
Harbin	Harubin	ハルビン	哈爾浜
Ürümqi	Urumuchi	ウルムチ	烏魯木斉
Qiqihar	Chichiharu	チチハル	斉斉哈爾
Lhasa	Rasa	ラサ	拉薩

Internationally renowned Chinese-named cities tend to imitate the older English pronunciations of their names, regardless of the kanji's on'yomi or the Mandarin or Cantonese pronunciation, and can be written in either katakana or kanji. Examples include:

English name	Traditional Chinese Characters	Simplified Chinese Characters	Mandarin name (pinyin)	Shanghainese name (Wugniu)	Hokkien name (Tâi-lô)	Cantonese name (Yale)	Kanji	Katakana	Rōmaji
Hong Kong	香港	香港	Xiānggǎng	shian-kaon	Hiong-káng / Hiang-káng	Hēung Góng	香港	ホンコン	Honkon
Macao/Macau	澳門	澳门	Àomén	au-men	Ò-mn̂g / Ò-muî / Ò-bûn	Ou Mún / Ou Mùhn	澳門	マカオ	Makao
Shanghai	上海	上海	Shànghǎi	zaon-he	Siōng-hái / Siǒng-hái / Siāng-hái	Seuhng Hói	上海	シャンハイ	Shanhai
Beijing/Peking	北京	北京	Běijīng	poq-cin	Pak-kiann	Bāk Gīng	北京	ペキン	Pekin
Nanjing/Nanking	南京	南京	Nánjīng	noe-cin	Lâm-kiann	Nàahm Gīng	南京	ナンキン	Nankin
Taipei	台北/臺北	台北	Táiběi	de-poq	Tâi-pak	Tòih Bāk	台北	タイペイ / タイホク	Taipei / Taihoku
Kaohsiung	高雄/打狗	高雄/打狗	Gāoxióng / Dǎgǒu	kau-yon / tan-keu	Ko-hiông / Tá-káu / Tánn-káu	Gōu Hùhng / Dá Gáu	高雄 / 打狗	カオシュン / タカオ	Kaoshun / Takao

Notes:

- Guangzhou, the city, is pronounced Kōshū, while Guangdong, its province, is pronounced Kanton, not *Kōtō (in this case, opting for a tō-on reading rather than the usual kan-on reading).
- Hangzhou (expected Kōshū) is often pronounced Kuishū to disambiguate with Guangzhou.
- Kaohsiung was originally pronounced Takao (or similar) in Hokkien and Japanese. It received this written name (kanji/Chinese) from Japanese, and later its spoken Mandarin name from the corresponding characters. The English name "Kaohsiung" derived from its Mandarin pronunciation. Today it is pronounced either カオシュン or タカオ in Japanese.
- Taipei is generally pronounced たいほく in Japanese.

In some cases the same kanji can appear in a given word with different readings. Normally this occurs when a character is duplicated and the reading of the second character has voicing (rendaku), as in 人人 hito-bito "people" (more often written with the iteration mark as 人々), but in rare cases the readings can be unrelated, as in tobi-haneru (跳び跳ねる; "hop around", more often written 飛び跳ねる).

=== Pronunciation assistance ===
Because of the ambiguities involved, kanji sometimes have their pronunciation for the given context spelled out in ruby characters known as furigana, (small kana written above or to the right of the character, e.g. 振仮名(ふりがな)) or kumimoji (small kana written in-line after the character). This is especially true in texts for children or foreign learners. It is also used in newspapers and manga for rare or unusual readings, or for situations like the first time a character's name is given, and for characters not included in the officially recognized set of essential kanji. Works of fiction sometimes use furigana to create new "words" by giving normal kanji non-standard readings, or to attach a foreign word rendered in katakana as the reading for a kanji or kanji compound of the same or similar meaning.

=== Spelling words ===
Conversely, specifying a given kanji, or spelling out a kanji word—whether the pronunciation is known or not—can be complicated, due to the fact that there is not a commonly used standard way to refer to individual kanji (one does not refer to "kanji #237"), and that a given reading does not map to a single kanji—indeed there are many homophonous words, not simply individual characters, particularly for kango (with on'yomi). It is easiest to write the word out—either on paper or tracing it in the air—or look it up (given the pronunciation) in a dictionary, particularly an electronic dictionary; when this is not possible, such as when speaking over the phone or writing implements are not available (and tracing in air is too complicated), various techniques can be used. These include giving kun'yomi for characters—these are often unique—using a well-known word with the same character (and preferably the same pronunciation and meaning), and describing the character via its components. For example, one may explain how to spell the word kōshinryō (香辛料; spice) via the words kao-ri (香り; fragrance), kara-i (辛い; spicy), and in-ryō (飲料; beverage)—the first two use the kun'yomi, the third is a well-known compound—saying "kaori, karai, ryō as in inryō."

=== Dictionaries ===
In dictionaries, both words and individual characters have readings glossed, via various conventions. Native words and Sino-Japanese vocabulary are glossed in hiragana (for both kun and on readings), while borrowings (gairaigo)—including modern borrowings from Chinese—are glossed in katakana; this is the standard writing convention also used in furigana. By contrast, readings for individual characters are conventionally written in katakana for on readings, and hiragana for kun readings. Kun readings may further have a separator to indicate which characters are okurigana, and which are considered readings of the character itself. For example, in the entry for 食, the reading corresponding to the basic verb eat (食べる, taberu) may be written as た.べる (ta.beru), to indicate that ta is the reading of the character itself. Further, kanji dictionaries often list compounds including irregular readings of a kanji.

== Local developments and divergences from Chinese ==
Since kanji are essentially Chinese hanzi used to write Japanese, the majority of characters used in modern Japanese still retain their Chinese meaning, physical resemblance with some of their modern traditional Chinese characters counterparts, and a degree of similarity with Classical Chinese pronunciation imported to Japan from the 5th to 9th centuries. Nevertheless, after centuries of development, there is a notable number of kanji used in modern Japanese which have different meaning from hanzi used in modern Chinese. Such differences are the result of:

- the use of characters created in Japan,
- characters that have been given different meanings in Japanese, and
- post-World War II simplifications (shinjitai) of the character.

Likewise, the process of character simplification in mainland China since the 1950s has resulted in the fact that Japanese speakers who have not studied Chinese may not recognize some simplified characters.

=== Kokuji ===
In addition to unique Japanese renditions of existing Chinese characters, there also exist kanji that were invented in Japan; these may be referred to as kokuji (国字; national characters) or wasei kanji (和製漢字; Japanese-made kanji). They are primarily formed by combining existing components in unique ways, as is typical for Chinese characters. The Jōyō list contains about 9 kokuji, of which the most commonly used is 働 (dō; work) used in the fundamental verb 働く (hataraku; to work). It is formed from the 'person' radical 亻 plus 動 (movement). Some kokuji, including 働, have entered the Chinese language.

The term kokuji may also refer to Chinese characters coined in other (non-Chinese) countries; the corresponding phenomenon in Korea is called gukja (Korean: 국자; Hanja: 國字; national characters); there are however far fewer Korean-coined characters than Japanese-coined ones. Other languages using the Chinese family of scripts sometimes have far more extensive systems of native characters, most significantly Vietnamese chữ Nôm, which comprises over 20,000 characters used throughout traditional Vietnamese writing, and Zhuang sawndip, which comprises over 10,000 characters, which are still in use.

=== Kokkun ===
In addition to kokuji, there are kanji that have been given meanings in Japanese that are different from their original Chinese meanings. These are not considered kokuji but are instead called kok‌kun (国訓) and include characters such as the following:

Char.	Japanese		Chinese	
Char.	Reading	Meaning	Pinyin	Meaning
藤	fuji	wisteria	téng	rattan, cane, vine
沖	oki	offing, offshore	chōng	rinse, minor river (Cantonese)
椿	tsubaki	Camellia japonica	chūn	Toona spp.
鮎	ayu	sweetfish	nián	catfish (rare, usually written 鯰)
咲	saki	blossom	xiào	smile (rare, usually written 笑)

== Types of kanji by category ==
Han-dynasty scholar Xu Shen, in his 2nd-century dictionary Shuowen Jiezi, classified Chinese characters into six categories (Chinese: 六書 liùshū, Japanese: 六書 rikusho). The traditional classification is still taught but is problematic and is no longer the focus of modern lexicographic practice, as some categories are not clearly defined, nor are they mutually exclusive: the first four refer to structural composition, while the last two refer to usage.

=== Shōkei moji (象形文字) ===
Shōkei (Mandarin: xiàngxíng) characters are pictographic sketches of the object they represent. For example, 目 is an eye, while 木 is a tree. The current forms of the characters are very different from the originals, though their representations are more clear in oracle bone script and seal script. These pictographic characters make up only a small fraction of modern characters.

=== Shiji moji (指事文字) ===
Shiji (Mandarin: zhǐshì) characters are ideographs, often called "simple ideographs" or "simple indicatives" to distinguish them and tell the difference from compound ideographs (below). They are usually simple graphically and represent an abstract concept such as 上 "up" or "above" and 下 "down" or "below". These make up a tiny fraction of modern characters.

=== Kaii moji (会意文字) ===
Kaii (Mandarin: huìyì) characters are compound ideographs, often called "compound indicatives", "associative compounds", or just "ideographs". These are usually a combination of pictographs that combine semantically to present an overall meaning. An example of this type is 休 (rest) from 亻 (person radical) and 木 (tree). Another is the kokuji 峠 (mountain pass) made from 山 (mountain), 上 (up) and 下 (down). These make up a tiny fraction of modern characters.

=== Keisei moji (形声文字) ===
Keisei (Mandarin: xíngshēng) characters are phono-semantic or radical-phonetic compounds, sometimes called "semantic-phonetic", "semasio-phonetic", or "phonetic-ideographic" characters, are by far the largest category, making up about 90% of the characters in the standard lists; however, some of the most frequently used kanji belong to one of the three groups mentioned above, so keisei moji will usually make up less than 90% of the characters in a text. Typically they are made up of two components, one of which (most commonly, but by no means always, the left or top element) suggests the general category of the meaning or semantic context, and the other (most commonly the right or bottom element) approximates the pronunciation. The pronunciation relates to the original Chinese, and may now only be distantly detectable in the modern Japanese on'yomi of the kanji; it generally has no relation at all to kun'yomi. The same is true of the semantic context, which may have changed over the centuries or in the transition from Chinese to Japanese. As a result, it is a common error in folk etymology to fail to recognize a phono-semantic compound, typically instead inventing a compound-indicative explanation.

=== Tenchū moji (転注文字) ===
Tenchū (Mandarin: zhuǎnzhù) characters have variously been called "derivative characters", "derivative cognates", or translated as "mutually explanatory" or "mutually synonymous" characters; this is the most problematic of the six categories, as it is vaguely defined. It may refer to kanji where the meaning or application has become extended. For example, 楽 is used for 'music' and 'comfort, ease', with different pronunciations in Chinese reflected in the two different on'yomi, gaku "music" and raku "pleasure".

=== Kasha moji (仮借文字) ===
Kasha (Mandarin: jiǎjiè) are rebuses, sometimes called "phonetic loans". The etymology of the characters follows one of the patterns above, but the present-day meaning is completely unrelated to this. A character was appropriated to represent a similar-sounding word. For example, 来 in ancient Chinese was originally a pictograph for "wheat". Its syllable was homophonous with the verb meaning "to come", and the character is used for that verb as a result, without any embellishing "meaning" element attached. The character for wheat 麦, originally meant "to come", being a keisei moji having 'foot' at the bottom for its meaning part and "wheat" at the top for sound. The two characters swapped meaning, so today the more common word has the simpler character. This borrowing of sounds has a very long history.

== Related symbols ==
The iteration mark (々) is used to indicate that the preceding kanji is to be repeated, functioning similarly to a ditto mark in English. It is pronounced as though the kanji were written twice in a row, for example iroiro (色々; "various") and tokidoki (時々; "sometimes"). This mark also appears in personal and place names, as in the surname Sasaki (佐々木). This symbol is a simplified version of the kanji 仝, a variant of dō (同; "same").

Another abbreviated symbol is ヶ, in appearance a small katakana ke, but actually a simplified version of the kanji 箇, a general counter. It is pronounced ka when used to indicate quantity (such as 六ヶ月, rokkagetsu "six months") or ga if used as a genitive (as in 関ヶ原 sekigahara "Sekigahara").

The way how these symbols may be produced on a computer depends on the operating system. In macOS, typing じおくり will reveal the symbol 々 as well as ヽ, ゝ and ゞ. To produce 〻, type おどりじ. Under Windows, typing くりかえし will reveal some of these symbols, while in Google IME, おどりじ may be used.

== Collation ==
Kanji, whose thousands of symbols defy ordering by conventions such as those used for the Latin script, are often collated using the traditional Chinese radical-and-stroke sorting method. In this system, common components of characters are identified; these are called radicals. Characters are grouped by their primary radical, then ordered by number of pen strokes within radicals. For example, the kanji character 桜, meaning "cherry", is sorted as a ten-stroke character under the four-stroke primary radical 木 meaning "tree". When there is no obvious radical or more than one radical, convention governs which is used for collation.

Other kanji sorting methods, such as the SKIP system, have been devised by various authors.

Modern general-purpose Japanese dictionaries (as opposed to specifically character dictionaries) generally collate all entries, including words written using kanji, according to their kana representations (reflecting the way they are pronounced). The gojūon ordering of kana is normally used for this purpose.

== Kanji education ==
An image that lists most jōyō-kanji, according to Halpern's KKLD indexing system, with kyo-iku kanji color-coded by grade level

Japanese schoolchildren are expected to learn 1,026 basic kanji, the kyōiku kanji, before finishing the sixth grade. The order in which these characters are learned is fixed. The kyōiku kanji list is a subset of a larger list, originally of 1,945 kanji and extended to 2,136 in 2010, known as the jōyō kanji required for the level of fluency necessary to read newspapers and literature in Japanese. This larger list of characters is to be mastered by the end of the ninth grade. Schoolchildren learn the characters by repetition and radical.

Students studying Japanese as a foreign language are often required by a curriculum to acquire kanji without having first learned the vocabulary associated with them. Strategies for these learners vary from copying-based methods to mnemonic-based methods such as those used in James Heisig's series Remembering the Kanji. Other textbooks use methods based on the etymology of the characters, such as Mathias and Habein's The Complete Guide to Everyday Kanji and Henshall's A Guide to Remembering Japanese Characters. Pictorial mnemonics, as in the text Kanji Pict-o-graphix by Michael Rowley, are also seen.

The Japan Kanji Aptitude Testing Foundation provides the Kanji kentei (日本漢字能力検定試験 Nihon kanji nōryoku kentei shiken; "Test of Japanese Kanji Aptitude"), which tests the ability to read and write kanji. The highest level of the Kanji kentei tests about six thousand kanji.

== See also ==
- Chinese influence on Japanese culture
- Braille kanji
- Hanja (Korean equivalent)
- Chữ Hán (Vietnamese equivalent)
- Han unification
- Chinese family of scripts
- Japanese script reform
- Japanese typefaces (shotai)
- Japanese writing system
- Kanji of the year
- List of kanji by stroke count
- Radical (Chinese character)
- Stroke order
- Table of kanji radicals
- Rōmaji – method of writing Japanese with the Latin alphabet
- Cangjie – legendary inventor of Chinese characters
