= Tōyō kanji =

List standardized kanji in Japan

The tōyō kanji (当用漢字; lit. "general-use kanji") are those kanji listed on the Tōyō kanji hyō (当用漢字表; literally "list of general-use kanji"), which was released by the Japanese Ministry of Education (文部省) on 16 November 1946, following a reform of kanji characters of Chinese origin in the Japanese language. The intention of the tōyō list was to declare which kanji could be used in official government documents.

The 1,850-character list was not meant to be exhaustive, as many characters that were in common use at the time, and are today, were not included. It was meant as a baseline for satisfactory functional literacy in Japanese at a secondary education level, as all of the listed characters were to be taught nationwide in compulsory education.

They were replaced in 1981 by the jōyō kanji, which initially included 1,945 characters, but was expanded to 2,136 characters in 2010 following several revisions.

== Reform ==
Thousands of kanji characters were in use in various writing systems, leading to great difficulties for those learning written Japanese. Additionally, several characters had identical meanings but were written differently from each other, further increasing complexity.

After World War II, the Ministry of Education decided to minimize the number of kanji by choosing the most commonly used kanji, along with simplified kanji (see Shinjitai) commonly appearing in contemporary literature, to form the tōyō kanji. This was an integral part of the postwar reform of Japanese national writing.

This was meant as a preparation for re-introducing their previous unsuccessful reform abolishing Chinese characters. Although the postwar timing meant no public debate was held on the future of the Japanese written language, the defenders of the original kanji system considered and accepted the tōyō kanji as a reasonable compromise. Since this compromise could not then be withdrawn in favour of more radical reform, discussion of kanji abolition ended. Thirty-five years passed before further reforms were brought to the Japanese written form.

The table of the pronunciations of the kanji was published in 1948 and the exposition of altered character forms (Shinjitai) in 1949.

In 1981, the Ministry of Education decided to replace the tōyō kanji with a more flexible system, leading to the publication of the jōyō kanji. This rendered the tōyō kanji obsolete.

== Applications and limitations ==
In addition to a list of the standardized tōyō kanji, the reform published by the Ministry for Education in 1946 also contains a set of guidelines for their use.

Regarding provenance and scope, the foreword of the document states that:

- The table of tōyō kanji put forth therein, are the selection of kanji recommended for use by the general public, including legal and governmental documents, newspapers, and magazines.
- The presented kanji are selected as an approximate set of those characters found to be of no insignificant utility in the lives of today's Japanese citizens.
- Concerning proper nouns, there is a wide range of usage beyond what may be formulated as rules, and consequently they are treated as outside the scope of this standard.
- The simplified character forms from modern custom are taken as the proper form, and their original forms are provided alongside them for reference.
- A systemization of the character forms and their readings is still under consideration (this referring to the later 1948 and 1949 publications that addressed these points in detail).

Regarding guidelines for use, it continues:

- If the kanji set forth in this standard do not suffice for the writing of a word, then either a different word should be substituted, or else the word shall be written in kana.
- Write pronouns, adverbs, conjunctions, interjections, auxiliary verbs, and particles using kana as much as possible (normally hiragana is used for these).
- Foreign placenames and people's names are to be written in kana, except that traditional usage examples such as 米国 (beikoku, America) or 英国 (eikoku, England) are permitted.
- Words of foreign origin are to be written in kana (katakana is customarily used, but exceptions occur).
- Names of plants and animals should be written in kana (katakana is frequently but not ubiquitously used for these).
- Ateji (words like 玉子 (tamago, egg) and 多分 (tabun, probably) that use the characters for their sounds, ignoring meaning) are to be written in kana. (This rule is not widely followed in practice.)
- As a general rule, furigana should not be used.
- Concerning technical and specialized terminology, it is hoped that the list of characters prescribed by the list of tōyō kanji will serve as a template for further standardization (acknowledging that the tōyō list may be insufficient for these applications, but should be used to guide more complete de facto standards).

(In the above, parenthetical remarks are used for exposition and do not reflect text that is present in the document.)

== Mazegaki ==
Because the majority of character-based words are composed of two (or more) kanji, many words were left with one character included in the tōyō kanji, and the other character missing. In this case, the recommendation was to write the included part in kanji and the excluded part in kana, e.g. ふ頭 for 埠頭 and 危ぐ for 危惧. These words were called mazegaki (交ぜ書き; "mixed characters").

== List of the 1,850 tōyō kanji ==
一 丁 七 丈 三 上 下 不 且 世 丘 丙 中 丸 丹 主 久 乏 乘 乙 九 乳 乾 乱 了 事 二 互 五 井 亞 亡 交 享 京 人 仁 今 介 仕 他 付 代 令 以 仰 仲 件 任 企 伏 伐 休 伯 伴 伸 伺 似 但 位 低 住 佐 何 佛 作 佳 使 來 例 侍 供 依 侮 侯 侵 便 係 促 俊 俗 保 信 修 俳 俵 併 倉 個 倍 倒 候 借 倣 値 倫 仮 偉 偏 停 健 側 偶 傍 傑 備 催 傳 債 傷 傾 働 像 僚 僞 僧 價 儀 億 儉 儒 償 優 元 兄 充 兆 先 光 克 免 兒 入 内 全 両 八 公 六 共 兵 具 典 兼 册 再 冒 冗 冠 冬 冷 准 凍 凝 凡 凶 出 刀 刃 分 切 刈 刊 刑 列 初 判 別 利 到 制 刷 券 刺 刻 則 削 前 剖 剛 剩 副 割 創 劇 剤 劍 力 功 加 劣 助 努 効 劾 勅 勇 勉 動 勘 務 勝 労 募 勢 勤 勳 励 勧 勺 匁 包 化 北 匠 匹 匿 区 十 千 升 午 半 卑 卒 卓 協 南 博 占 印 危 却 卵 卷 卸 卽 厘 厚 原 去 参 又 及 友 反 叔 取 受 口 古 句 叫 召 可 史 右 司 各 合 吉 同 名 后 吏 吐 向 君 吟 否 含 呈 呉 吸 吹 告 周 味 呼 命 和 咲 哀 品 員 哲 唆 唐 唯 唱 商 問 啓 善 喚 喜 喪 喫 單 嗣 嘆 器 噴 嚇 嚴 嘱 囚 四 回 因 困 固 圈 國 囲 園 円 図 團 土 在 地 坂 均 坊 坑 坪 垂 型 埋 城 域 執 培 基 堂 堅 堤 堪 報 場 塊 塑 塔 塗 境 墓 墜 增 墨 堕 墳 墾 壁 壇 圧 壘 壞 士 壯 壱 壽 夏 夕 外 多 夜 夢 大 天 太 夫 央 失 奇 奉 奏 契 奔 奧 奪 獎 奮 女 奴 好 如 妃 妊 妙 妥 妨 妹 妻 姉 始 姓 委 姫 姻 姿 威 娘 娯 娠 婆 婚 婦 婿 媒 嫁 嫡 孃 子 孔 字 存 孝 季 孤 孫 学 宅 宇 守 安 完 宗 官 宙 定 宜 客 宣 室 宮 宰 害 宴 家 容 宿 寂 寄 密 富 寒 察 寡 寢 実 寧 審 写 寬 寮 宝 寸 寺 封 射 將 專 尉 尊 尋 対 導 小 少 就 尺 尼 尾 尿 局 居 届 屈 屋 展 層 履 属 山 岐 岩 岸 峠 峰 島 峽 崇 崩 岳 川 州 巡 巢 工 左 巧 巨 差 己 市 布 帆 希 帝 帥 師 席 帳 帶 常 帽 幅 幕 幤 干 平 年 幸 幹 幻 幼 幽 幾 床 序 底 店 府 度 座 庫 庭 庶 康 庸 廉 廊 廃 廣 廳 延 廷 建 弊 式 弓 弔 引 弟 弦 弧 弱 張 強 彈 形 彩 彫 彰 影 役 彼 往 征 待 律 後 徐 径 徒 得 從 御 復 循 微 徵 德 徹 心 必 忌 忍 志 忘 忙 忠 快 念 怒 怖 思 怠 急 性 怪 恆 恐 恥 恨 恩 恭 息 悦 悔 悟 患 悲 悼 情 惑 惜 惠 惡 惰 悩 想 愁 愉 意 愚 愛 感 愼 慈 態 慌 慕 惨 慢 慣 慨 慮 慰 慶 憂 憎 憤 憩 憲 憶 憾 懇 應 懲 懷 懸 恋 成 我 戒 戰 戲 戸 房 所 扇 手 才 打 扱 扶 批 承 技 抄 抑 投 抗 折 抱 抵 押 抽 拂 拍 拒 拓 拔 拘 拙 招 拜 括 拷 拾 持 指 振 捕 捨 掃 授 掌 排 掘 掛 採 探 接 控 推 措 描 提 揚 換 握 揭 揮 援 損 搖 捜 搬 携 搾 摘 摩 撤 撮 撲 擁 択 擊 操 担 拠 擦 挙 擬 拡 攝 支 收 改 攻 放 政 故 敘 教 敏 救 敗 敢 散 敬 敵 敷 数 整 文 斗 料 斜 斤 斥 新 断 方 施 旅 旋 族 旗 既 日 旨 早 旬 昇 明 易 昔 星 映 春 昨 昭 是 時 晚 晝 普 景 晴 晶 暇 暑 暖 暗 暫 暮 暴 曆 曇 曉 曜 曲 更 書 替 最 会 月 有 服 朕 朗 望 朝 期 木 未 末 本 札 朱 机 朽 材 村 束 杯 東 松 板 析 林 枚 果 枝 枯 架 柄 某 染 柔 査 柱 柳 校 株 核 根 格 栽 桃 案 桑 梅 條 械 棄 棋 棒 森 棺 植 業 極 栄 構 槪 樂 楼 標 枢 模 樣 樹 橋 機 橫 檢 櫻 欄 権 次 欲 欺 款 歌 欧 歓 止 正 步 武 歳 歷 帰 死 殉 殊 殖 残 段 殺 殿 殴 母 每 毒 比 毛 氏 民 氣 水 氷 永 求 汗 汚 江 池 決 汽 沈 沒 沖 河 沸 油 治 沼 沿 況 泉 泊 泌 法 波 泣 注 泰 泳 洋 洗 津 活 派 流 浦 浪 浮 浴 海 浸 消 涉 液 涼 淑 淚 淡 淨 深 混 清 浅 添 減 渡 測 港 渴 湖 湯 源 準 溫 溶 滅 滋 滑 滯 滴 満 漁 漂 漆 漏 演 漢 漫 漸 潔 潜 潤 潮 澁 澄 沢 激 濁 濃 濕 済 濫 浜 滝 瀨 湾 火 灰 災 炊 炎 炭 烈 無 焦 然 煮 煙 照 煩 熟 熱 燃 燈 燒 営 燥 爆 炉 爭 爲 爵 父 片 版 牛 牧 物 牲 特 犠 犬 犯 狀 狂 狩 狹 猛 猶 獄 独 獲 猟 獸 献 玄 率 玉 王 珍 珠 班 現 球 理 琴 環 璽 甘 生 産 用 田 由 甲 申 男 町 界 畑 畔 留 畜 畝 略 番 画 (Note: Given in the Chinese style.) 異 当 疊 疎 疑 疫 疲 疾 病 症 痘 痛 痢 痴 療 癖 登 発 白 百 的 皆 皇 皮 盆 益 盛 盜 盟 盡 監 盤 目 盲 直 相 盾 省 看 眞 眠 眼 睡 督 瞬 矛 矢 知 短 石 砂 砲 破 研 硝 硫 硬 碁 碎 碑 確 磁 礁 礎 示 社 祈 祉 祕 祖 祝 神 祥 票 祭 禁 禍 福 禪 礼 秀 私 秋 科 秒 租 秩 移 税 程 稚 種 称 稻 稿 穀 積 穗 穏 穫 穴 究 空 突 窒 窓 窮 窯 窃 立 並 章 童 端 競 竹 笑 笛 符 第 筆 等 筋 筒 答 策 箇 算 管 箱 節 範 築 篤 簡 簿 籍 米 粉 粒 粗 粘 粧 粹 精 糖 糧 系 糾 紀 約 紅 紋 納 純 紙 級 紛 素 紡 索 紫 累 細 紳 紹 紺 終 組 結 絶 絞 絡 給 統 糸 絹 経 綠 維 綱 網 綿 緊 緖 線 締 緣 編 緩 緯 練 縛 縣 縫 縮 縱 総 績 繁 織 繕 絵 繭 繰 継 続 纎 欠 罪 置 罰 署 罷 羊 美 着 群 義 羽 翁 翌 習 翼 老 考 者 耐 耕 耗 耳 聖 聞 声 職 聽 粛 肉 肖 肝 肥 肩 肪 肯 育 肺 胃 背 胎 胞 胴 胸 能 脂 脅 脈 脚 脱 脹 腐 腕 脳 腰 腸 腹 膚 膜 膨 胆 臟 臣 臨 自 臭 至 致 台 與 興 旧 舌 舍 舖 舞 舟 航 般 舶 船 艇 艦 良 色 芋 芝 花 芳 芽 苗 若 苦 英 茂 茶 草 荒 荷 莊 茎 菊 菌 菓 菜 華 万 落 葉 著 葬 蒸 蓄 薄 薦 薪 薰 藏 藝 藥 藩 虐 処 虛 虜 虞 号 蚊 融 虫 蚕 蛮 血 衆 行 術 街 衝 衞 衡 衣 表 衰 衷 袋 被 裁 裂 裏 裕 補 裝 裸 製 複 襲 西 要 覆 見 規 視 親 覚 覽 観 角 解 触 言 訂 計 討 訓 託 記 訟 訪 設 許 訴 診 詐 詔 評 詞 詠 試 詩 詰 話 該 詳 誇 誌 認 誓 誕 誘 語 誠 誤 説 課 調 談 請 論 諭 諮 諸 諾 謀 謁 謄 謙 講 謝 謠 謹 証 識 譜 警 訳 議 護 誉 読 変 讓 谷 豆 豊 豚 象 豪 予 貝 貞 負 財 貢 貧 貨 販 貫 責 貯 弐 貴 買 貸 費 貿 賀 賃 賄 資 賊 賓 賜 賞 賠 賢 賣 賦 質 賴 購 贈 賛 赤 赦 走 赴 起 超 越 趣 足 距 跡 路 跳 踊 踏 践 躍 身 車 軌 軍 軒 軟 軸 較 載 軽 輝 輩 輪 輸 轄 轉 辛 弁 辞 辱 農 込 迅 迎 近 返 迫 迭 述 迷 追 退 送 逃 逆 透 逐 途 通 速 造 連 逮 週 進 逸 遂 遇 遊 運 遍 過 道 達 違 逓 遠 遣 適 遭 遅 遵 遷 選 遺 避 還 辺 邦 邪 邸 郊 郞 郡 部 郭 郵 都 鄕 配 酒 酢 酬 酪 酵 酷 酸 醉 醜 医 釀 釈 里 重 野 量 金 針 鈍 鈴 鉛 銀 銃 銅 銑 銘 鋭 鋼 錄 錘 錠 銭 錯 鍊 鍛 鎖 鎭 鏡 鐘 鉄 鑄 鑑 鉱 長 門 閉 開 閑 間 閣 閥 閲 関 防 阻 附 降 限 陛 院 陣 除 陪 陰 陳 陵 陶 陷 陸 陽 隆 隊 階 隔 際 障 隣 随 險 隠 隷 隻 雄 雅 集 雇 雌 双 雜 離 難 雨 雪 雲 零 雷 電 需 震 霜 霧 露 霊 青 靜 非 面 革 音 韻 響 頂 項 順 預 頒 領 頭 題 額 顏 願 類 顧 顯 風 飛 飜 食 飢 飮 飯 飼 飽 飾 養 餓 余 館 首 香 馬 駐 騎 騰 騷 駆 驗 驚 駅 骨 髄 体 高 髮 鬪 鬼 魂 魅 魔 魚 鮮 鯨 鳥 鳴 鷄 塩 麗 麦 麻 黃 黑 默 点 党 鼓 鼻 斎 歯 齢

== See also ==
- Japanese script reform
