= Furigana =

Japanese style of ruby text

Furigana (振り仮名; Japanese pronunciation: [ɸɯɾigaꜜna] or [ɸɯɾigana]) is a Japanese reading aid consisting of smaller kana (syllabic characters) printed either above or next to kanji (logographic characters) or other characters, to indicate their pronunciation or sometimes their meaning. It is one type of ruby text. Furigana is also known as yomigana (読み仮名) and rubi (ルビ; [ɾɯꜜbi]) in Japanese. In modern Japanese, it is usually used to gloss rare kanji, to clarify rare, nonstandard or ambiguous kanji readings, or in children's or learners' materials. Before the post-World War II script reforms, it was more widespread.

Furigana is most often written in hiragana, though in certain cases it may be written in katakana. Romaji or kanji can also be used as ruby characters instead of kana. In vertical text, tategaki, the furigana is usually placed to the right of the line of text; in horizontal text, yokogaki, it is usually placed above the line of text, as illustrated below.

日(に)本(ほん)語(ご)	or	日(に)本(ほん)語(ご)

In less common instances, furigana may be place below horizontal text, to the left of vertical text, or (in even rarer cases) on both sides of the kanji.

The term furigana comes from the stem of the verb furu (振(ふ)る, to sprinkle on) and kana (仮名(かな)).

== Appearance ==
Furigana may be added by character, in which furigana character(s) are centered over each corresponding kanji individually; or by word or phrase, in which the entire furigana text is centered over several kanji, even if the kanji do not represent equal shares of the kana spelling. The latter method is more common, especially since some words in Japanese have unique pronunciations (jukujikun) unrelated to the readings of any of the kanji in a word.

Furigana fonts are generally sized so that two kana characters fit naturally over one kanji; when more kana are required, this is resolved either by adjusting the furigana by using a condensed font (narrowing the kana), or by adjusting the kanji by intercharacter spacing (adding spaces around the kanji). In case an isolated kanji character has a long reading—for example 〜に携わる (where 携 reads たずさ, tazusa)—the furigana may instead spill over into the space next to the neighboring kana characters, without condensing or changing spacing. Three-kana readings are not uncommon, particularly due to yōon with a long vowel, such as ryō (りょう); five kana are required for kokorozashi (志、こころざし) and six for uketamawaru (承る、うけたまわる), the longest of any character in the Joyo kanji. Very long readings also occur for certain kanji or symbols which have a gairaigo (loan word) reading; the word "centimeter" is generally written as "cm" (two half-width characters occupying one space) and has the seven-kana reading センチメートル (senchimētoru) (it can also be written as the kanji 糎, though this is very rare); another common example is "%" (the percent sign), which has the five kana reading パーセント (pāsento). These cause severe spacing problems due to length and these words being used as units (hence closely associated with the preceding figure).

The distinction between regular kana and the smaller character forms (yōon and sokuon), which are used in regular orthography to mark such things as gemination and palatalization, is often not made in furigana: for example, the usual hiragana spelling of the word 却下 (kyakka) is きゃっか, but in furigana it might be written きやつか. This was especially common in old-fashioned movable type printing when smaller fonts were not available. Nowadays, with computer-based printing systems, this occurs less frequently.

=== Katakana ===
When it is necessary to distinguish between native Japanese kun'yomi pronunciations and Chinese-derived on'yomi pronunciations, for example in kanji dictionaries, the kun'yomi pronunciations are written in hiragana, and the on'yomi pronunciations are written in katakana. However, this distinction is really only important in dictionaries and other reference works. In ordinary prose, the script chosen will usually be hiragana. The general exceptions to this are written with katakana, for example:

- Modern Chinese place names, personal names, food names, and other loanwords
  - Examples: 上海(シャンハイ), 烏龍(ウーロン), 麻辣湯(マーラータン), 回鍋肉(ホイコーロー), 功夫(カンフー), 無問題(モーマンタイ) (from Cantonese)
  - In more casual writing these are simply written in katakana, as borrowed words
- Single kanji, jukujikun, and Chinese place names with gairaigo readings
  - Single kanji: 頁(ページ), 零(ゼロ), 節(ノット), 垢(アカ) (ateji for the abbreviation of アカウント)
  - Jukujikun: 煙草(タバコ), 合羽(カッパ), 珈琲(コーヒー), 加里(カリ), 倶楽部(クラブ), 越幾斯(エキス)
  - Chinese place names: 北京(ペキン), 広東(カントン)
- Rare or dated, alternate kanji spellings of gairaigo
  - Single kanji: 釦(ボタン), 打(ダース), 米(メートル), 瓦(グラム), 屯(トン), 吋(インチ), 呎(フィート), 碼(ヤード), 哩(マイル), 弗(ドル), 片(ペンス)
  - Multiple kanji: 硝子(ガラス), 檸檬(レモン), 麦酒(ビール), 朱欒(ザボン), 基督(キリスト), 燐寸(マッチ), 天鵞絨(ビロード), 木乃伊(ミイラ)
  - Foreign place names: 亜米利加(アメリカ), 印度(インド), 独逸(ドイツ)
- Animal and plant names are sometimes in katakana
  - Examples: 兎(ウサギ), 牛(ウシ), 紫陽花(アジサイ), 銀杏(イチョウ)

Occasionally this style is also used for aesthetic choices, usually with loanwords from other languages (especially English). For example, the kanji 一角獣 (literally 'one horn beast') might be glossed with katakana ユニコーン, yunikōn, to show the pronunciation of the loanword "unicorn", which is unrelated to the normal reading of the kanji. Generally, though, such loanwords are just written in straight katakana.

== Alignment rules in word processing or typesetting ==
Various word processing or typesetting software programs, such as Microsoft Word, Adobe InDesign, Adobe InCopy, etc. have features for adding ruby text, especially Japanese furigana. Among formatting features are different rules for aligning the kana over or to the right of the base text, usually either when the base text string is longer than the furigana string or vice versa. Extra spaces may be needed depending on the size of the shorter string (either the ruby string or the base string) relatively to the longer one.

- Centered, left/top or right/bottom: No spaces are added in between the characters. The shorter string is aligned to the center (中付きルビ nakatsuki rubi), the left/top (肩付きルビ katatsuki rubi) or the right/bottom of the longer string.
- 1-2-1 (JIS): Spaces are added at the start of and the end of the shorter string, and in between its component characters, so that the spaces in between are twice as wide or tall as the spaces at the start and at the end. Space width or height is calculated based on the width or height of the square bounding box of a glyph (Japanese typefaces are generally monospaced). The strings are still, in essence, aligned to the center of each other, rather than to the left/top or right/bottom.
- 0-1-0: Equal spaces are added, similarly to the 1-2-1 rule, in between the component characters of the shorter string, but not its start or end.

== Usage ==
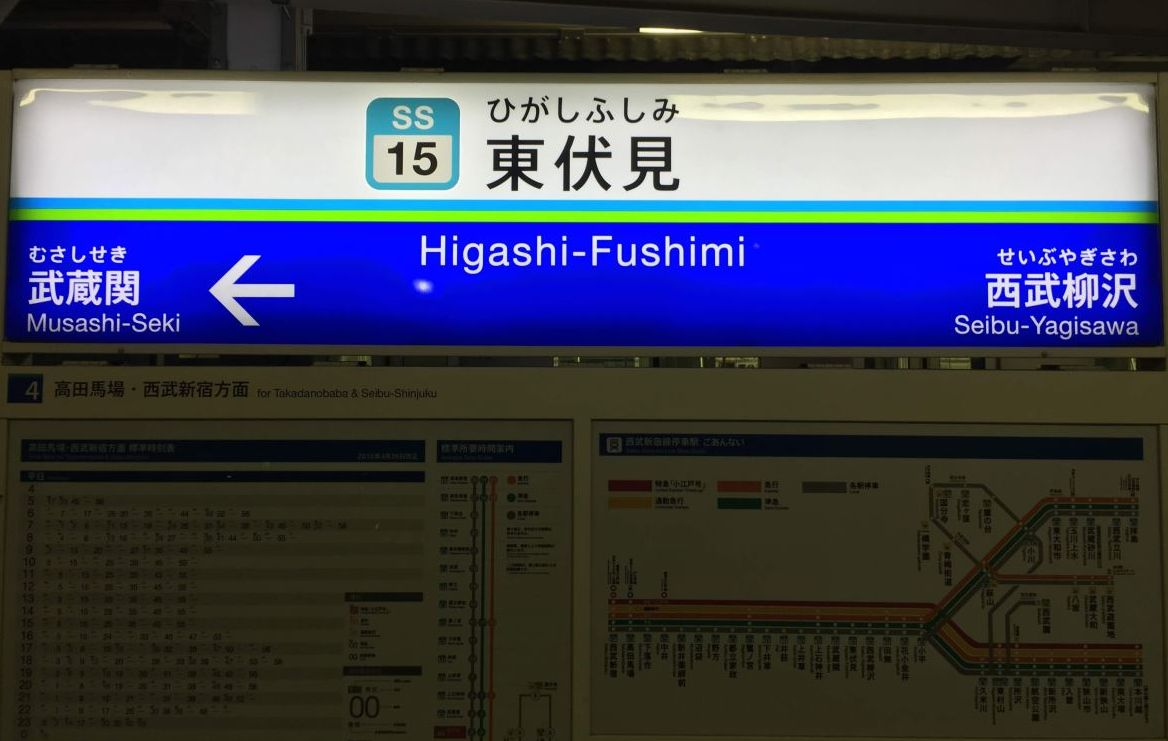
Furigana indicates the pronunciation above the kanji for the names of three stations on the Seibu Railway: 東伏見(ひがしふしみ) (Higashi-Fushimi), 武蔵関(むさしせき) (Musashi-Seki), and 西武柳沢(せいぶやぎさわ) (Seibu-Yagisawa). The sign also includes romaji below the kanji for each station.

=== Numeric characters ===
Numeric characters used for counting are usually not tagged with furigana, e.g. 二本(ほん) / 2本(ほん), 2つめ, 第(だい)二巻(かん) / 第(だい)2巻(かん), and 2ページ. Exceptions include a few cases such as 一人 / 1人 and 二人 / 2人, which may be tagged with separate kana for each character (一(ひと)人(り) / 1(ひと)人(り)) or non-separated kana for the whole word (一人(ひとり) / 1人(ひとり)) depending on the style of the publisher in question, and characters for numerals greater than 1,000 (千), such as 万 (10,000), 億 (100,000,000). However, numeric words in established compounds like 一(いっ)歩(ぽ) and 一(ひと)目(め) are generally tagged with furigana.

=== Children's works ===
Furigana are most commonly used in works for children, who may not have sufficiently advanced reading skills to recognize the kanji, but can understand the word when written phonetically in hiragana. Because children learn hiragana before katakana, in books for very young children, there are hiragana－furigana next to the katakana characters. It is common to use furigana on all kanji characters in works for young children. This is called sōrubi (総ルビ) in Japanese.

Many children's manga, shōnen and shōjo manga use furigana (again however, rarely on numerals). Shōnen and shōjo manga tend to have furigana for all non-numeric characters, while some manga (such as early volumes of Doraemon and other manga published by Shogakukan), may also ignore furigana on elementary-grade kanji or easy words. (Note: For example, in the Doraemon short titled 人間切(せつ)断(だん)機(き), the word 人間 has no furigana.) Seinen and josei manga ignores furigana most of the time, even on the names of the characters if they're common names, although some publishers may still routinely use furigana for the first mentions of important characters' names in a volume or chapter.

Some websites, tools, and apps exist which add furigana to Japanese web pages (alternatively rōmaji or kiriru-moji as ruby characters); these are popular with both Japanese children and foreign Japanese learners.

=== General ===
In works aimed at adult Japanese speakers, furigana may be used on a word written in uncommon kanji; in the mass media, they are generally used on words containing non-Jōyō kanji.

Furigana also commonly appear alongside kanji names and their romanizations on signs for railway stations, even if the pronunciation of the kanji is commonly known. Furigana also appear often on maps to show the pronunciation of unusual place names.

Before the second world war, the Japanese youth might have arguably been almost illiterate, and unable to read texts containing high amounts of Kanji if not for furigana.

=== Names ===
Japanese names are usually written in kanji. Because there are many possible readings for kanji names, including special name-only readings called nanori, furigana are often used to give the readings of names. On Japanese official forms, where the name is to be written, there is always an adjacent column for the name to be written in furigana. In general, forms require hiragana if ふりがな is written as the field name, and katakana if フリガナ is written instead.

Furigana may also be used for foreign names written in kanji. Chinese and Korean names are the most common examples: Chinese names are usually pronounced with Japanese readings and the pronunciation written in hiragana, while Korean names are usually pronounced with Korean readings and the pronunciation written in katakana.

=== Language learning ===
Kanji and kanji compounds are often presented with furigana in Japanese-language textbooks for non-native speakers. There are books and websites such as NHK News Web Easy with furigana (sometimes in rōmaji ruby characters instead) for Japanese learners, which may be bilingual or Japanese only. These are popular with foreigners wishing to master Japanese faster and enjoy reading Japanese short stories, novels or articles. It also makes it easier to look up words with kanji in a dictionary. Although, some people discourage the use of furigana as they claim learners may be over-reliant on them.

Furigana are also often used in foreign-language textbooks for Japanese learners to indicate pronunciation. The words are written in the original foreign script, such as hangul for Korean, and furigana is used to indicate the pronunciation. According to Ministry of Education guidelines, and the opinions of educators, the use of Japanese furigana should be avoided in English teaching due to the differences in pronunciation between English and Japanese. For instance, the word "birthdate" might be glossed in furigana as バースデイト (bāsudeito), which corresponds to an imperfect pronunciation.

=== Disambiguation ===
Most words with kanji that have several readings can be easily disambiguated based on context. However, in situations with limited context or that an author wants to make it very clear, furigana may be used to do show which reading is intended. Examples are 私(わたし) and 私(わたくし), 辛(つら)い and 辛(から)い, 大人気(だいにんき) and 大人気(おとなげ), 上手(じょうず) and 上手(うわて), etc.

=== Gikun ===
Furigana unrelated to the kanji they are assigned to are often used to convey certain effects, rather than to denote a phonetic guide, especially in manga, anime, video games, and tabletop games. This usage is known as 義訓 gikun (see also Kanji special readings). The specific effects vary.

It may be used to visually reinforce complex ideas without having to use long expressions. For example, the word 悪夢 akumu 'nightmare' may be annotated with しんじつ shinjitsu 'truth' (i.e. 悪夢(しんじつ)) rather than its true reading, to convey the meaning of "nightmarish truth". Some authors may even use furigana that means the opposite of what the base text does to reinforce the complicated relationship between characters. For example, 親友 shin'yū 'close friend' may be annotated with ライバル raibaru 'rival', to mean "a rival who is also friend".

Another use is to indicate the meanings of ambiguous or foreign words. For example, the word ここ (koko, 'here') may be annotated with a more specific description like 病院 byōin 'hospital' (i.e. 病院(ここ)) to mean "here (at this hospital)". Or in a work of science fiction, an astronaut may use the word ふるさと furusato 'my hometown', when referring to planet Earth; to clarify that for the reader, ふるさと may be written over the word 地球 chikyū 'Earth'. A similar technique is used in Japanese subtitles on foreign films to associate the written Japanese with the sounds actually being spoken by the actors, or in a translation of a work of fiction to preserve the original sound of a proper name in furigana while indicating its meaning with kanji. For example, "Firebolt" in the Harry Potter series is written 炎の雷(ファイアボルト), composed of the kanji 炎の雷 honō no ikazuchi 'flame thunderbolt' and the furigana ファイアボルト faiaboruto.

Some manga combine the rendition of a foreign word (especially an obscure one) in furigana as the intended reading of a term, with more familiar kanji as the meaning. For example, 駅 eki 'station' may be annotated with ステーション sutēshon (the rendition of the English "station") to convey a foreign, exotic feel. This is sometimes done conversely, for example, by annotating an exotic term like ベーゼ bēze 'kiss' with a more common synonym like キッス kissu.

Some writers use furigana to represent slang pronunciations, particularly those that would be difficult to understand without the kanji to provide their meaning. Others use it simply to shrink kana spellings that are too long, thanks to the small type of furigana. For example, インターポール intāpōru "Interpol" may be shortened to ICPO(インターポール).

=== Karaoke ===
In karaoke it is common for furigana to be placed on the song lyrics. The song lyrics are often written in kanji pronounced quite differently from the furigana. The furigana version is used for pronunciation. Sometimes, katakana is written above foreign words written in other scripts (usually English) as a pronunciation guide, for example: new world(ニューワールド).

== Other Japanese reading aids ==
=== Okurigana ===
Okurigana are kana that appear inline at normal size following kanji stems, typically to complete and to inflect adjectives and verbs. In this use they may also help to disambiguate kanji with multiple readings; for example, 上がる (あがる, agaru) vs. 上る (のぼる, noboru). Unlike furigana, the use of okurigana is a mandatory part of the written language.

=== Kunten ===
In the written style known as kanbun, which is the Japanese approximation of Classical Chinese, small marks called kunten are sometimes added as reading aids. Unlike furigana, which indicate pronunciation, kunten indicate Japanese grammatical structures absent from the kanbun, and also show how words should be reordered to fit Japanese sentence structure.

=== Furikanji ===
Ruby characters are sometimes also used to indicate meaning, rather than pronunciation. Over the foreign text, smaller-sized Japanese words, in kana or kanji, corresponding to the meaning of the foreign words, effectively translate it in place. While rare now, some late 19th–early 20th century authors used kanji as ruby for loanwords written in katakana. This usage is called furikanji (振り漢字) in Japanese, since furigana implies the use of kana. For example, リリック(歌詞) ririkku 'lyric' may be tagged with 歌詞 kashi 'lyrics' for clarification rather than for phonetic guidance.

== See also ==
- Okurigana
- Ruby character
- Zhuyin
