= Jōyō kanji =

2136 kanji recommended for proficiency in Japanese

The jōyō kanji (常用漢字; Japanese pronunciation: [dʑoːjoːkaꜜɲdʑi], lit. "regular-use kanji") are kanji listed on the Jōyō kanji hyō (常用漢字表; literally "regular-use kanji list"), which is issued by the Japanese Ministry of Education. The current list of 2,136 characters was issued in 2010. It is a slightly modified version of the tōyō kanji, which was the initial list of secondary school–level kanji standardized after World War II. The list is not a comprehensive list of all characters and readings in regular use; rather, it is intended as a literacy baseline for those who have completed compulsory education, as well as a list of permitted characters and readings for use in official government documents. Due to the requirement that official government documents make use of only jōyō kanji and their readings, several rare characters are also included due to their use in the Constitution of Japan, which was being written at the same time the original 1,850-character tōyō kanji list was compiled.

The 2,136 kanji in the jōyō kanji consist of:

- 1,026 kanji taught in primary school (grades 1–6) (the kyōiku kanji)
- 1,110 additional kanji taught in secondary school (grades 7–9)

== Changes from the tōyō kanji ==
In 1981, the jōyō kanji replaced the tōyō kanji as the standardized list of common kanji. The differences between the two consisted of 95 additional characters, and the simplification of 燈 as 灯.

== History ==
- 1923: The Ministry of Education specified 1,962 kanji and 154 simplified characters.
- 1931: The former jōyō kanji list was revised and 1,858 characters were specified.
- 1942: 1,134 characters as standard jōyō kanji and 1,320 characters as sub-jōyō kanji were specified.
- 1946: The 1,850 characters of tōyō kanji were adopted by law "as those most essential for common use and everyday communication". This list included 881 "basic requirement" kanji for elementary school.
- 1981: The 1,945 characters of jōyō kanji were adopted, replacing the list of tōyō kanji.
- 2010: The list was revised on 30 November to include an additional 196 characters and remove five characters (勺, 銑, 脹, 錘, and 匁), for a total of 2,136. The amendment also made changes to the readings of kanji present in the previous jōyō kanji list. Twenty-eight kanji gained new readings, three kanji lost obscure readings and the kun'yomi of 側 was changed from kawa (かわ) to gawa (がわ). The 196 additional characters are:

媛 怨 鬱 唄 淫 咽 茨 彙 椅 萎 畏 嵐 宛 顎 曖 挨 韓 鎌 葛 骸 蓋 崖 諧 潰 瓦 牙 苛 俺 臆 岡 旺 艶 稽 憬 詣 熊 窟 串 惧 錦 僅 巾 嗅 臼 畿 亀 伎 玩 挫 沙 痕 頃 駒 傲 乞 喉 梗 虎 股 舷 鍵 拳 桁 隙 呪 腫 嫉 𠮟/叱 鹿 餌 摯 恣 斬 拶 刹 柵 埼 塞 采 戚 脊 醒 凄 裾 須 腎 芯 尻 拭 憧 蹴 羞 袖 汰 遜 捉 踪 痩 曽 爽 遡 狙 膳 箋 詮 腺 煎 羨 鶴 爪 椎 捗 嘲 貼 酎 緻 綻 旦 誰 戴 堆 唾 鍋 謎 梨 奈 那 丼 貪 頓 栃 瞳 藤 賭 妬 塡[填] 溺 諦 阜 訃 肘 膝 眉 斑 阪 汎 氾 箸 剝[剥] 罵 捻 虹 匂 喩 闇 弥 冶 麺 冥 蜜 枕 昧 勃 頰[頬] 貌 蜂 蔑 璧 餅 蔽 脇 麓 籠 弄 呂 瑠 瞭 侶 慄 璃 藍 辣 拉 沃 瘍 妖 湧 柿 哺 楷 睦 釜 錮 賂 毀 勾
Note: Characters in bold are used in the names of prefectures. Jōyō kanji followed by a character in brackets are not included in JIS X 0208; the character in brackets is the unofficial print variant JIS X 0208 does have. JIS X 0208 also lacks 𠮟, but does include the official variant 叱. The jōyō kanji 茨, 韓, 牙, and 栃 also have official variants.

The Ministry of Education, Culture, Sports, Science and Technology instructed teachers to start teaching the new characters in fiscal 2012, and high schools and universities started using the characters in their entrance exams in the 2015 academic year.

== See also ==
- Basic Hanja for educational use, a standardized list of Chinese characters used in Korean (Hanja) published by the South Korean Ministry of Education
- Hyōgaiji
- Japanese script reform
- Jinmeiyō kanji
- Kanji radicals
- Kyōiku kanji (List of kanji by school year)
- Learning kanji
- The List of Commonly Used Standard Chinese Characters, a similar standardized list of characters published by the Chinese Ministry of Education, including those designated as "frequently-used" and "commonly-used"
