= Tense =

Tense may refer to:

== Linguistics ==
- Grammatical tense, a property of verbs indicating chronology
  - Tense–aspect–mood, a wider set of verb features (colloquially "tense")
- Tenseness, a constrained pronunciation, especially of vowels

== Arts and media ==
- Tense (album), a 2014 album by TVXQ
- Tense (artwork), a 1990 art installation by Anya Gallaccio
- The Tense, a 2025 concert tour by Taeyeon

== Other uses ==
- Tense, a state of muscle contraction
- Tense, a sequence of modifiers in tense logic

== See also ==
- Tension (disambiguation)
- Tensed, Idaho, US
- - Tense Nervous Head (1993 EP) and Tense Moments (1994 mini-album) by Headswim
  - Tense Nervous Headache, 1988 album by Boy George
  - "Dating Tense!", a song on 2015 album Undertale Soundtrack by Toby Fox
  - E-Tense, a brand of DS Automobiles
  - Future tense (disambiguation)
  - In Tense, 2022 album by Harish Raghavan
  - "The Orchestra Is Feeling Tense", a song on 2024 album Black Friday by Tom Odell
  - Past Tense (disambiguation)
  - Perfect Tense (album), by Fallulah, 2016
  - Present Tense (disambiguation)
  - "Preset Tense", a song on 2017 album From Deewee by Soulwax
  - The Rupture Tense, 2022 poetry book by Jenny Xie
  - Quarter tense, an Irish Christian event
- Stiff voice, a method of pronunciation
