= Stress =

Stress may refer to:

== Science and medicine ==
- Stress (biology), an organism's response to a stressor such as an environmental condition
- Stress (linguistics), relative emphasis or prominence given to a syllable in a word, or to a word in a phrase or sentence
- Stress (mechanics), the internal forces that neighboring particles of a continuous material exert on each other
- Oxidative stress, an imbalance of free radicals
- Psychological stress, a feeling of strain and pressure
  - Occupational stress, stress related to one's job
- Surgical stress, systemic response to surgical injury

== Arts, entertainment, and media ==
=== Music ===
==== Groups and musicians ====
- Stress (Brazilian band), a Brazilian heavy metal band
- Stress (British band), a British rock band
- Stress (pop rock band), an early 1980s melodic rock band from San Diego
- Stress (musician) (born 1977), hip hop singer from Switzerland
- Stress (record producer) (born 1979), artistic name of Can Canatan, Swedish musician and record producer

==== Albums ====
- Stress (Anonymus album), 1997
- Stress (Daddy Freddy album), 1991
- Stress (Stress album), self-titled album by Brazilian band Stress
- Stress: The Extinction Agenda, 1994 album by Organized Konfusion

==== Songs ====
- "Stress" (Justice song), 2007 song by Justice
- "The Stress", a 1989 song by Chisato Moritaka
- "Stress", a song by Odd Børre, Norway's entry in the 1968 Eurovision Song Contest
- "Stress", a song by Godsmack from Godsmack
- "Stress", a 2000 song by Jim's Big Ego

==== Music techniques ====
- Stress (music), a type of emphasis placed on a particular note or set of notes

=== Other arts, entertainment, and media ===
- Stress (journal), a medical journal
- "Stress" (Not Going Out), a television episode
- "Stress" (The Unit), a television episode

== Other uses ==
- Stress (font), varying stroke widths of a font

== See also ==
- Emphasis (disambiguation)
- Stress cracking (disambiguation)
- Stress intensity factor
- Stress tensor (disambiguation)
- Stress test (disambiguation)
- Tension (disambiguation)
