= Japanese writing system =

Japanese
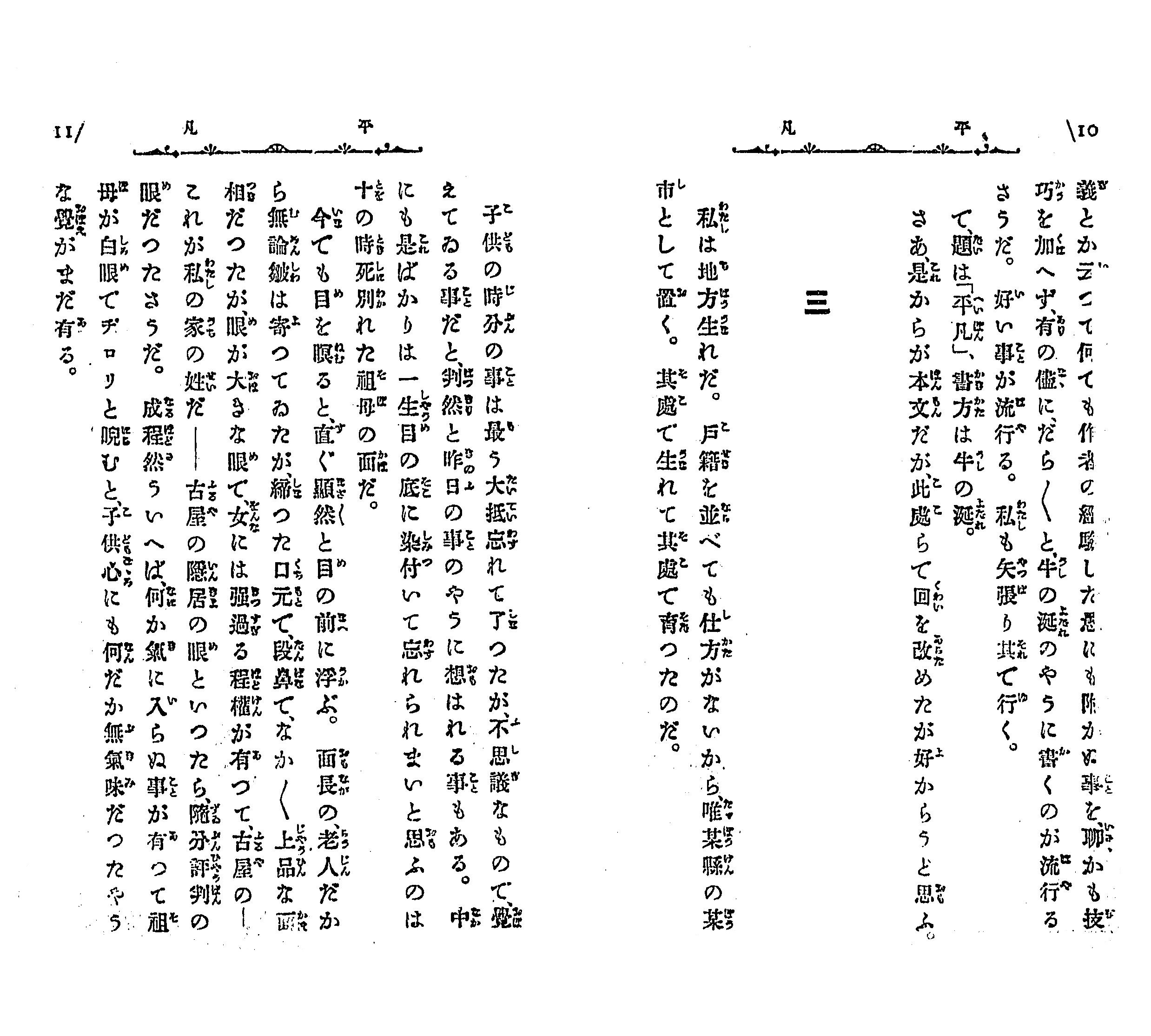
- Japanese novel using kanji kana majiri bun (text with both kanji and kana), the most general orthography for modern Japanese. Ruby characters (or furigana) are also used to transcribe kanji words (in modern publications these would generally be omitted for well-known kanji). The text is in the traditional tategaki ("vertical writing") style; it is read down the columns and from right to left, like traditional Chinese. Published in 1908.
- Script type: mixed logographic (Kanji), syllabic (Kana)
- Period: 4th century AD to present
- Direction: Top-to-bottom, right-to-left; Left-to-right, top-to-bottom
- Languages: Japanese language Ryukyuan languages Hachijō language

Related scripts
- Parent systems: (See kanji and kana): Japanese

ISO 15924
- ISO 15924: Jpan (413), Japanese (alias for Han + Hiragana + Katakana)

Unicode
- Unicode range: U+4E00–U+9FBF Kanji; U+3040–U+309F Hiragana; U+30A0–U+30FF Katakana

The modern Japanese writing system (日本語の表記体系, Nihongo no hyōki taikei) uses a combination of logographic kanji, which are adopted Chinese characters; and phonographic kana, which evolved from cursives/components of Chinese characters. Modern kana consists of two sets of syllabaries: hiragana, used primarily for native or naturalized Japanese words and grammatical elements; and katakana, used primarily for foreign names, loanwords (gairaigo), onomatopoeia, scientific terminology and sometimes for emphasis. A third set, hentaigana, are historical variants of the now-standard hiragana, and are still sometimes used for stylistic purposes. Almost all written Japanese sentences contain a mixture of kanji and kana. Because of this mixture of scripts, in addition to a large inventory of usable kanji characters, the Japanese writing system is considered to be one of the most complicated currently in use.

Several thousand kanji characters are in regular use, which mostly originate from traditional Chinese characters. Others made indigenously in Japan are referred to as "Japanese kanji" (和製漢字, wasei kanji), also known as "[our] country's kanji" (国字, kokuji). Each character has an intrinsic semantic meaning (or range of meanings), and most have more than one pronunciation, the choice of which depends on context. There are 2,136 commonly used ones (jōyō kanji) as of 2010, and Japanese school students are required to learn 1,026 characters (kyōiku kanji) before graduating sixth grade. The total number of kanji is well over 50,000, though this includes tens of thousands of characters only present in historical writings and never used in modern Japanese. Despite the complexity of writing kanji, modern Japanese texts without kanji are rare; most are either children's books — since children tend to know few kanji at an early age — or early electronics, including computers, feature phones and video games, which could not display complex graphemes like kanji due to both graphical and computational limitations of the hardware and software.

In modern kana usage, hiragana and katakana syllabaries each contain 46 basic characters (which can be organized using the gojūon), or 71 including diacritics, in their alphabet sets. With one or two minor exceptions, each different sound in the Japanese language (that is, each different syllable; strictly, each mora) corresponds to one character in each syllabary. Unlike kanji, the only function of kana characters is to transcribe pronunciations; they can only convey semantic meanings after forming words. Although hiragana and katakana characters both derived from the earlier man'yōgana — which are Chinese characters used as loangraphs during the Nara period for phonetic transcription using their Middle Chinese pronunciations — their forms have been simplified/modified to such an extent that they are no longer visually obvious to their grapholinguistic origins.

To a lesser extent, modern written Japanese also uses initialisms from the Latin alphabet, for example in terms such as "BC/AD", "a.m./p.m.", "FBI", and "CD". Romanized Japanese is most frequently used by foreign students of Japanese who have not yet mastered kana, and by native speakers for computer input.

== Use of scripts ==
=== Kanji ===
Kanji (漢字) are logographic characters taken from Chinese script (since 1946, simplified to shinjitai) and used in the writing of Japanese.

It is known from archaeological evidence that the first contacts that the Japanese had with Chinese writing took place in the 1st century AD, during the late Yayoi period. However, the Japanese people of that era probably had little to no comprehension of the script, and they would remain relatively illiterate until the 5th century AD in the Kofun period, when writing in Japan became more widespread.

Kanji characters are used to write most content words of native Japanese or (historically) Chinese origin, which include the following:

- many nouns, such as 川 (kawa, "river") and 学校 (gakkō, "school")
- the stems of most verbs and adjectives, such as 見 in 見る (miru, "see") and 白 in 白い (shiroi, "white")
- the stems of many adverbs, such as 速 in 速く (hayaku, "quickly") and 上手 as in 上手に (jōzu ni, "masterfully")
- most Japanese personal names and place names, such as 田中 (Tanaka) and 東京 (Tōkyō). (Certain names may be written in hiragana or katakana, or some combination of these, plus kanji.)

Some Japanese words are written with different kanji depending on the specific usage of the word—for instance, the word naosu (to fix, or to cure) is written 治す when it refers to curing a person, and 直す when it refers to fixing an object.

Most kanji have more than one possible pronunciation (or "reading"), and some common kanji have many. These are broadly divided into on'yomi, which are readings that approximate to a Chinese pronunciation of the character at the time it was adopted into Japanese, and kun'yomi, which are pronunciations of native Japanese words that correspond to the meaning of the kanji character. However, some kanji terms have pronunciations that correspond to neither the on'yomi nor the kun'yomi readings of the individual kanji within the term, such as 明日 (ashita, "tomorrow") and 大人 (otona, "adult").

Unusual or nonstandard kanji readings may be glossed using furigana. Kanji compounds are sometimes given arbitrary readings for stylistic purposes. For example, in the 5th night of Ten Nights of Dreams by Natsume Sōseki, 接続って is used for tsunagatte, the gerundive -te form of the verb tsunagaru ("to connect"), which would usually be written as 繋がって or つながって. The word 接続, meaning "connection", is normally pronounced setsuzoku.

=== Kana ===
Kana (仮名) are a set of syllabic scripts used in the Japanese writing system. The term originally means 'provisional' or 'borrowed names'. In modern usage, kana are primarily divided into hiragana and katakana, though historically they also included other forms such as man'yōgana and sōgana. All types of kana ultimately derive from Chinese characters (kanji): they borrow the original phonetic values of kanji and were developed from simplified forms or components of those characters.

Historically, there was no strict functional distinction between hiragana and katakana. Texts could be written in a mixture of Chinese characters and either form of kana entirely alone without a fixed division of roles. This situation changed following language reforms after World War II, which established a functional division between the two syllabaries comparable to the distinction between lowercase and uppercase letters in Western alphabetic scripts. In contemporary Japanese, the pronunciation and orthography of kana are regulated by the system known as modern kana usage (gendai kanazukai).

==== Hiragana ====
Hiragana (平仮名) emerged as a manual simplification via cursive script of the most phonetically widespread kanji among those who could read and write during the Heian period (794–1185). The main creators of the current hiragana were ladies of the Japanese imperial court, who used the script in the writing of personal communications and literature, such as the Tale of Genji.

Hiragana is used to write the following:

- okurigana (送り仮名)—inflectional endings for adjectives and verbs—such as る in 見る (miru, "see") and い in 白い (shiroi, "white"), and respectively た and かった in their past tense inflections 見た (mita, "saw") and 白かった (shirokatta, "was white").
- joshi (助詞)—small, usually common words that, for example, mark sentence topics, subjects and objects or have a purpose similar to English prepositions such as "in", "to", "from", "by" and "for".
- miscellaneous other words of various grammatical types that lack a kanji rendition, or whose kanji is obscure, difficult to typeset, or considered too difficult to understand for the context (such as in children's books).
- furigana (振り仮名)—phonetic renderings of hiragana placed above or beside the kanji character. Furigana may aid children or non-native speakers or clarify nonstandard, rare, or ambiguous readings, especially for words that use kanji not part of the jōyō kanji list.

There is also some flexibility for words with common kanji renditions to be instead written in hiragana, depending on the individual author's preference (all Japanese words can be spelled out entirely in hiragana or katakana, even when they are normally written using kanji). Some words are colloquially written in hiragana and writing them in kanji might give them a more formal tone, while hiragana may impart a softer or more emotional feeling. For example, the Japanese word kawaii, the Japanese equivalent of "cute", can be written entirely in hiragana as in かわいい, or with kanji as 可愛い.

Some lexical items that are normally written using kanji have become grammaticalized in certain contexts, where they are instead written in hiragana. For example, the root of the verb 見る (miru, "see") is normally written with the kanji 見 for the mi portion. However, when used as a supplementary verb as in 試してみる (tameshite miru) meaning "to try out", the whole verb is typically written in hiragana as みる, as we see also in 食べてみる (tabete miru, "try to eat [it] and see").

==== Katakana ====
Katakana (片仮名) emerged around the 9th century, in the Heian period, when Buddhist monks created a syllabary derived from Chinese characters to simplify their reading, using portions of the characters as a kind of shorthand. The origin of the system is attributed to the monk Kūkai.

Katakana is used to write the following:

- transliteration of foreign words and names (by transcription into Japanese), such as コンピュータ (konpyūta, "computer") and ロンドン (Rondon, "London"). However, some foreign borrowings that were naturalized may be rendered in hiragana, such as たばこ (tabako, "tobacco"), which comes from Portuguese.
- commonly used names of animals and plants, such as トカゲ (tokage, "lizard"), ネコ (neko, "cat") and バラ (bara, "rose"), and certain other technical and scientific terms, including chemical and mineral names such as カリウム (kariumu, "potassium"), ポリマー (porimā, "polymer") and ベリル (beriru, "beryl").
- occasionally, the names of miscellaneous other objects whose kanji are rare, such as ローソク (rōsoku, "candle"); the kanji form, 蝋燭, contains the hyōgaiji 蝋.
- onomatopoeia, such as ワンワン (wan-wan, "woof-woof"), and other sound symbolism
- emphasis, much like italicisation in European languages.

Katakana can also be used to impart the idea that words are spoken in a foreign or otherwise unusual accent; for example, the speech of a robot.

=== Rōmaji ===
The first contact of the Japanese with the Latin alphabet occurred in the 16th century, during the Muromachi period, when they had contact with Portuguese navigators, the first European people to visit the Japanese islands. The earliest Japanese romanization system was based on Portuguese orthography. It was developed around 1548 by a Japanese Catholic named Anjirō.

The Latin alphabet is used to write the following:

- Latin-alphabet acronyms and initialisms, such as NATO or UFO
- Japanese personal names, corporate brands, and other words intended for international use (for example, on business cards, in passports, etc.)
- foreign names, words, and phrases, often in scholarly contexts
- foreign words deliberately rendered to impart a foreign flavour, for instance, in commercial contexts
- other Japanized words derived or originated from foreign languages, such as Jリーグ (jei rīgu, "J.League"), Tシャツ (tī shatsu, "T-shirt") or B級グルメ (bī-kyū gurume, "B-rank gourmet [cheap and local cuisines]")

=== Arabic numerals ===
Arabic numerals (as opposed to traditional kanji numerals) are often used to write numbers in horizontal text, especially when numbering things rather than indicating a quantity, such as telephone numbers, serial numbers and addresses. Arabic numerals were introduced in Japan probably at the same time as the Latin alphabet, in the 16th century during the Muromachi period, the first contact being via Portuguese navigators. These numerals did not originate in Europe, as the Portuguese inherited them during the Arab occupation of the Iberian peninsula.

In the modern period, Japanese keyboards, such as the IME (Input Method Editor), primarily default their usage to the fullwidth Unicode Arabic numerals １ as opposed to 1, though most actual usage uses the common halfwidth one 1, especially when used to represent a quantity. The fullwidth character may be used for spacing purposes aesthetically.

=== Hentaigana ===
Hentaigana (変体仮名), a set of archaic kana made obsolete by the Meiji reformation, are sometimes used to impart an archaic flavor, like in items of food (esp. soba).

=== Additional mechanisms ===
Jukujikun is the writing of words using kanji that reflect the meaning of the word though the pronunciation of the word is entirely unrelated to the usual pronunciations of the constituent kanji. Conversely, ateji is the employment of kanji that appear solely to represent the sound of the compound word but are, conceptually, utterly unrelated to the signification of the word.

=== Examples ===
Sentences are commonly written using a combination of all three Japanese scripts: kanji (in red), hiragana (in purple), and katakana (in orange), and in limited instances also include Latin alphabet characters (in green) and Arabic numerals (in black):

Tシャツを3枚購入しました。

The same text can be transliterated to the Latin alphabet (rōmaji), although this will generally only be done for the convenience of foreign language speakers:

Tīshatsu o san-mai kōnyū shimashita.

Translated into English, this reads:

I bought 3 T-shirts.

All words in modern Japanese can be written using hiragana, katakana, and rōmaji, while only some have kanji. Words that have no dedicated kanji may still be written with kanji by employing either ateji (as in man'yogana, から = 可良) or jukujikun, as in the title of とある科学の超電磁砲 (超電磁砲 being used to represent レールガン).

Kanji	Hiragana	Katakana	Rōmaji	English translation
私	わたし	ワタシ	watashi	I, me
金魚	きんぎょ	キンギョ	kingyo	goldfish
煙草 or 莨	たばこ	タバコ	tabako	tobacco, cigarette
東京	とうきょう	トーキョー	tōkyō	Tokyo, literally meaning "eastern capital"
八十八	やそはち	ヤソハチ	yasohachi	eighty-eight
none	です	デス	desu	is, am, to be (hiragana, of Japanese origin); death (katakana, of English origin)

Although rare, there are some words that use all three scripts in the same word. An example of this is the term くノ一 (kunoichi), which uses a hiragana, a katakana, and a kanji character, in that order. It is said that if all three characters are put in the same kanji "square", they all combine to create the kanji 女 (woman/female). Another example is 消しゴム (keshigomu) which means "eraser", and uses a kanji, a hiragana, and two katakana characters, in that order.

=== Statistics ===
A statistical analysis of a corpus of the Japanese newspaper Asahi Shimbun from the year 1993 (around 56.6 million tokens) revealed:

Character frequency
Characters	Types	Proportion of corpus (%)
Kanji	4,476	41.38
Hiragana	83	36.62
Katakana	86	6.38
Punctuation and symbols	99	13.09
Arabic numerals	10	2.07
Latin letters	52	0.46

Kanji frequency
Frequency rank	Cumulative frequency (%)
10	10.00
50	27.41
100	40.71
200	57.02
500	80.68
1,000	94.56
1,500	98.63
2,000	99.72
2,500	99.92
3,000	99.97

== Collation ==
Collation (word ordering) in Japanese is based on the kana, which express the pronunciation of the words, rather than the kanji. The kana may be ordered using two common orderings, the prevalent gojūon (fifty-sound) ordering, or the old-fashioned iroha ordering. Kanji dictionaries are usually collated using the radical system, though other systems, such as SKIP, also exist.

== Direction of writing ==
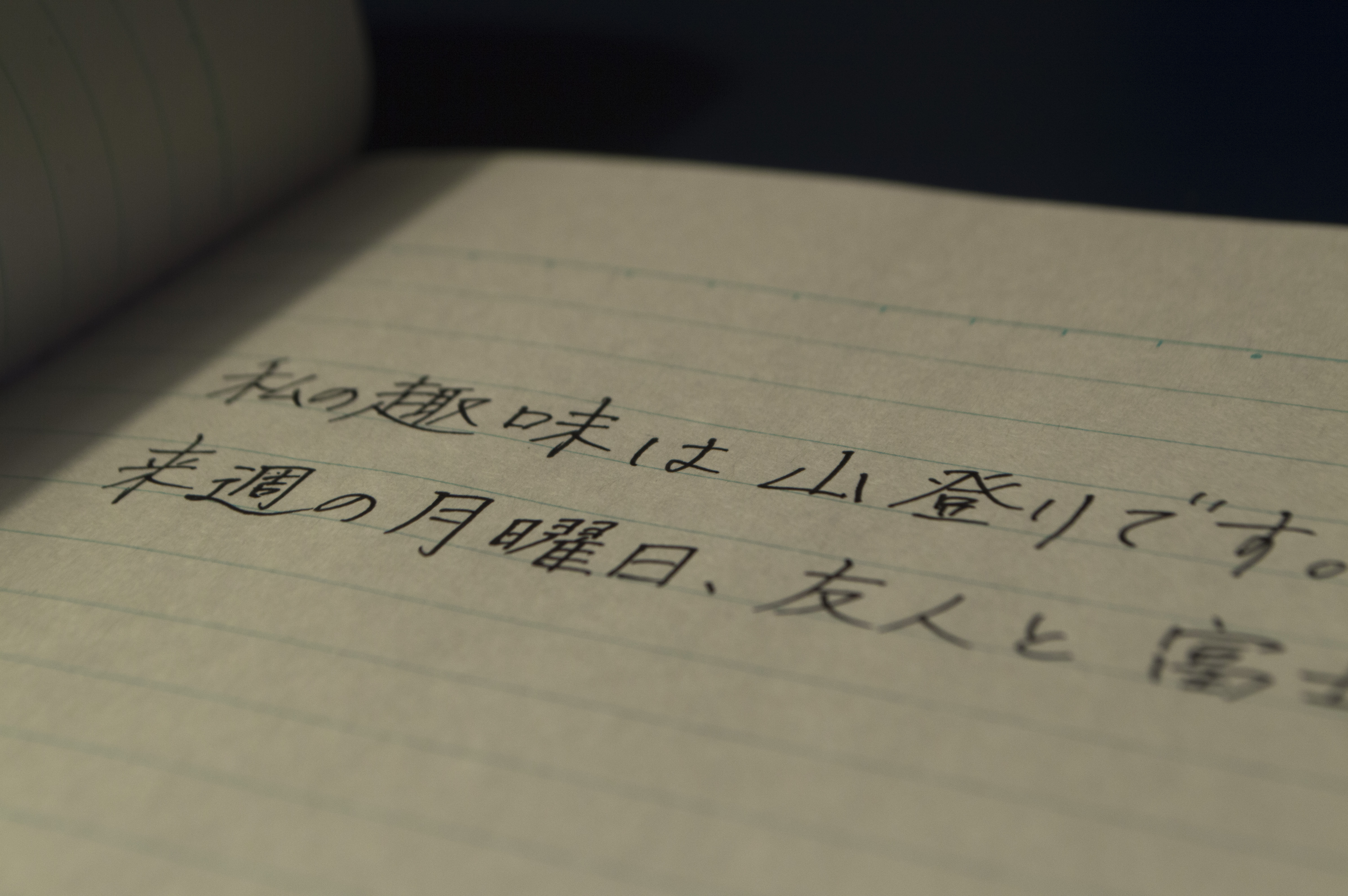
Yokogaki

Traditionally, Japanese is written in a format called tategaki (縦書き), which was inherited from traditional Chinese practice. In this format, the characters are written in columns going from top to bottom, with columns ordered from right to left. After reaching the bottom of each column, the reader continues at the top of the column to the left of the current one.

Modern Japanese also uses another writing format, called yokogaki (横書き). This writing format is horizontal and reads from left to right, as in English.

A book printed in tategaki opens with the spine of the book to the right, while a book printed in yokogaki opens with the spine to the left.

== Spacing and punctuation ==
Japanese is normally written without spaces between words, and text is allowed to wrap from one line to the next without regard for word boundaries. This convention was originally modelled on Chinese writing, where spacing is superfluous because each character is essentially a word in itself (although compounds are common). However, in text involving kana, readers of Japanese must work out where word divisions lie based on an understanding of what makes sense. For example, あなたはお母さんにそっくりね。 must be mentally divided as あなた / は / お母さん / に / そっくり / ね。 (Anata wa okāsan ni sokkuri ne; "You're just like your mother"). In rōmaji, it may sometimes be ambiguous whether an item should be transliterated as two words or one. For example, 愛する ("to love"), composed of 愛 (ai; "love") and する (suru; [a verb-forming suffix here]), is variously transliterated as aisuru or ai suru. Particles, like the possessive particle の in 君の犬 ("your dog"), are sometimes joined with the preceding term (kimino inu), or written as separate words (kimi no inu).

Words in potentially unfamiliar foreign compounds, normally transliterated in katakana, may be separated by a punctuation mark called a 中黒 (nakaguro; "middle dot") to aid Japanese readers. For example, ビル・ゲイツ (Biru Geitsu; Bill Gates). This punctuation is also occasionally used to separate native Japanese words, especially in concatenations of kanji characters where there might otherwise be confusion or ambiguity about interpretation, and especially for the full names of people.

The Japanese full stop (。) and comma (、) are used for similar purposes to their English equivalents, though comma usage can be more fluid than is the case in English. There is no clear standard of where the positions of commas should be inserted in a Japanese sentence. The question mark (？) is not used in traditional or formal Japanese, but it may be used in informal writing, or in transcriptions of dialogue where it might not otherwise be clear that a statement was intoned as a question. The exclamation mark (！) is restricted to informal writing. Colons and semicolons are available but are not common in ordinary text. Quotation marks are written as 「 ... 」, and nested quotation marks as 『 ... 』. Several bracket styles and dashes are available.

== History of the Japanese script ==
=== Importation of kanji ===
Japan's first encounters with Chinese characters may have come as early as the 1st century AD with the King of Na gold seal, said to have been given by Emperor Guangwu of Han in AD 57 to a Japanese emissary. However, it is unlikely that the Japanese became literate in Chinese writing any earlier than the 4th century AD.

Initially Chinese characters were not used for writing Japanese, as literacy meant fluency in Classical Chinese, not vernacular Japanese. Eventually a system called kanbun (漢文) developed. This system, which closely resembled Classical Chinese in grammar and employed kanji, used diacritics to hint at the Japanese translation. Informal mokkan (木簡) wooden tablets dating from mid-7th to mid-8th century were written in both Classical Chinese and Old Japanese kanbun, suggesting that literacy was widespread in the late 7th century. The earliest surviving written history of Japan, the Kojiki (古事記), compiled sometime before 712, was written in kanbun. Even today Japanese high schools and some junior high schools teach kanbun as part of the curriculum.

=== The development of man'yōgana ===
No full-fledged script for written Japanese existed until the development of man'yōgana (万葉仮名), which adapted kanji for their phonetic value (derived from their Chinese readings) rather than their semantic value. Man'yōgana was initially used to record poetry, as in the Man'yōshū (万葉集), compiled sometime before 759, whence the writing system derives its name. Some scholars claim that man'yōgana originated from Baekje, but this hypothesis is denied by mainstream Japanese scholars. The modern kana, namely hiragana and katakana, are simplifications and systemizations of man'yōgana.

Due to the large number of words and concepts entering Japan from China which had no native equivalent, many words entered Japanese directly, with a similar pronunciation to the original Chinese. This Chinese-derived reading is known as on'yomi (音読み), and this vocabulary as a whole is referred to as Sino-Japanese in English and kango (漢語) in Japanese. At the same time, native Japanese already had words corresponding to many borrowed kanji. Authors increasingly used kanji to represent these words. This Japanese-derived reading is known as kun'yomi (訓読み). A kanji may have none, one, or several on'yomi and kun'yomi. Okurigana are written after the initial kanji for verbs and adjectives to give inflection and to help disambiguate a particular kanji's reading. The same character may be read several different ways depending on the word. For example, the character 行 is read i as the first syllable of iku (行く; "to go"), okona as the first three syllables of okonau (行う; "to carry out"), gyō in the compound word gyōretsu (行列; "line" or "procession"), kō in the word ginkō (銀行; "bank"), and an in the word andon (行灯; "lantern").

Some linguists have compared the Japanese borrowing of Chinese-derived vocabulary as akin to the influx of Romance vocabulary into English during the Norman conquest of England. Like English, Japanese has many synonyms of differing origin, with words from both Chinese and native Japanese. Sino-Japanese is often considered more formal or literary, just as latinate words in English often mark a higher register.

=== Script reforms ===
==== Meiji period ====
The significant reforms of the 19th century Meiji era did not initially impact the Japanese writing system. However, the language itself was changing due to the increase in literacy resulting from education reforms, the massive influx of words (both borrowed from other languages or newly coined), and the ultimate success of movements such as the influential genbun itchi (言文一致) which resulted in Japanese being written in the colloquial form of the language instead of the wide range of historical and classical styles used previously. The difficulty of written Japanese was a topic of debate, with several proposals in the late 19th century that the number of kanji in use be limited. In addition, exposure to non-Japanese texts led to unsuccessful proposals that Japanese be written entirely in kana or rōmaji. This period saw Western-style punctuation marks introduced into Japanese writing.

In 1900, the Education Ministry introduced three reforms aimed at improving the process of education in Japanese writing:

- standardization of hiragana, eliminating the range of hentaigana then in use;
- restriction of the number of kanji taught in elementary schools to about 1,200;
- reform of the irregular kana representation of the Sino-Japanese readings of kanji to make them conform with the pronunciation.

The first two of these were generally accepted, but the third was hotly contested, particularly by conservatives, to the extent that it was withdrawn in 1908.

==== Pre–World War II ====
The partial failure of the 1900 reforms combined with the rise of nationalism in Japan effectively prevented further significant reform of the writing system. The period before World War II saw numerous proposals to restrict the number of kanji in use, and several newspapers voluntarily restricted their kanji usage and increased usage of furigana; however, there was no official endorsement of these, and much opposition. However, one successful reform was the standardization of hiragana, which involved reducing the possibilities of writing down Japanese morae down to only one hiragana character per morae, which led to labeling all the other previously used hiragana as hentaigana and discarding them in daily use.

==== Post–World War II ====
The period immediately following World War II saw a rapid and significant reform of the writing system. This was in part due to influence of the Occupation authorities, but to a significant extent was due to the removal of traditionalists from control of the educational system, which meant that previously stalled revisions could proceed. The major reforms were:

- gendai kanazukai (現代仮名遣い)—alignment of kana usage with modern pronunciation, replacing the old historical kana usage (1946);
- promulgation of various restricted sets of kanji:
  - tōyō kanji (当用漢字) (1946), a collection of 1850 characters for use in schools, textbooks, etc.;
  - kanji to be used in schools (1949);
  - an additional collection of jinmeiyō kanji (人名用漢字), which, supplementing the tōyō kanji, could be used in personal names (1951);
- simplifications of various complex kanji letter-forms shinjitai (新字体).

At one stage, an advisor in the Occupation administration proposed a wholesale conversion to rōmaji, but it was not endorsed by other specialists and did not proceed.

In addition, the practice of writing horizontally in a right-to-left direction was generally replaced by left-to-right writing. The right-to-left order was considered a special case of vertical writing, with columns one character high, rather than horizontal writing per se; it was used for single lines of text on signs, etc. (e.g., the station sign at Tokyo reads 駅京東, which is 東京駅 from right-to-left). The post-war reforms have mostly survived, although some of the restrictions have been relaxed. The replacement of the tōyō kanji in 1981 with the 1,945 jōyō kanji (常用漢字)—a modification of the tōyō kanji—was accompanied by a change from "restriction" to "recommendation", and in general the educational authorities have become less active in further script reform. In 2004, the jinmeiyō kanji (人名用漢字), maintained by the Ministry of Justice for use in personal names, was significantly enlarged. The jōyō kanji list was later extended to 2,136 characters in 2010.

== Romanization ==
There are a number of methods of rendering Japanese in Roman letters. The Hepburn method of romanization, designed for English speakers, is a de facto standard widely used inside and outside Japan. The Kunrei-shiki system has a better correspondence with Japanese phonology. There are differences in the romanization, such as Kunrei-shiki writing "ち" as "ti", while the Hepburn writes it as "chi". Other systems of romanization include Nihon-shiki, JSL, and Wāpuro rōmaji.

=== Lettering styles ===
- East Asian sans-serif typeface
- Edomoji
- Shodō
- Minchō

=== Variant writing systems ===
- Gyaru-moji
- Hentaigana
- Man'yōgana

== See also ==
- Ainu language § Writing
- Chinese writing system
- Genkō yōshi (graph paper for writing Japanese)
- Iteration mark (Japanese duplication marks)
- Japanese Braille
- Japanese language and computers
- Japanese manual syllabary
- Japanese typographic symbols (non-kana, non-kanji symbols)
- Kaidā glyphs (Yonaguni)
- Okinawan writing system
- Siddhaṃ script (Indic alphabet used for Buddhist scriptures)

== Sources ==
- Frellesvig, Bjarke (2010). A history of the Japanese language. Cambridge New York: Cambridge University Press. ISBN 978-0-521-65320-6.
- Gottlieb, Nanette (1996). Kanji Politics: Language Policy and Japanese Script. Kegan Paul. ISBN 0-7103-0512-5.
- Habein, Yaeko Sato (1984). The History of the Japanese Written Language. University of Tokyo Press. ISBN 0-86008-347-0.
- Miyake, Marc Hideo (2003). Old Japanese: A Phonetic Reconstruction. RoutledgeCurzon. ISBN 0-415-30575-6.
- Piggott, Joan R. (1990). "Mokkan. Wooden Documents from the Nara Period". Monumenta Nipponica. 45 (4): 449–470. doi:10.2307/2385379. ISSN 0027-0741. JSTOR 2385379.
- Seeley, Christopher (1984). "The Japanese Script since 1900". Visible Language. XVIII. 3: 267–302.
- Seeley, Christopher (1991). A History of Writing in Japan. University of Hawai'i Press. ISBN 0-8248-2217-X.
- Twine, Nanette (1991). Language and the Modern State: The Reform of Written Japanese. Routledge. ISBN 0-415-00990-1.
- Unger, J. Marshall (1996). Literacy and Script Reform in Occupation Japan: Reading Between the Lines. OUP. ISBN 0-19-510166-9.
