= Eminent =

Eminent may refer to:

- Eminent Technology, an American audio electronics company
- Eminent BV, a Dutch organ manufacturer
- HMS Eminent (W 116), a Royal Navy tugboat

== See also ==
- Eminence (disambiguation)
- Eminent domain, the power of a state to take private property for public use
- Eminent Lives, a biography series
- Prominence (disambiguation)
- Ranking, a relationship between a set of items
- Well known
