= Tensor (disambiguation) =

A tensor is an algebraic object that describes a multilinear relationship between sets of algebraic objects related to a vector space.

Tensor may also refer to:

== Mathematics ==
- Tensor (intrinsic definition)
- Tensor field
- Tensor product
- Tensor (obsolete), the norm used on the quaternion algebra in William Rowan Hamilton’s work; see Classical Hamiltonian quaternions § Tensor
- Symmetric tensor, a tensor that is invariant under a permutation of its vector arguments

== Computer science ==
- Tensor (machine learning), the application of tensors to artificial neural networks
- Tensor Processing Unit, an integrated circuit developed by Google for neural network machine learning
- Google Tensor, a system on a chip (Soc) found on some Pixel smartphones beginning with the Pixel 6
- TensorFlow, a technology developed by Google

== Other uses ==
- Tensor Trucks, a skateboarding truck company
- Tensor lamp, a trademarked brand of small high-intensity low-voltage desk lamp

== See also ==
- Tensor muscle (disambiguation)
- Tensor type, in tensor analysis
- Category: Tensors
- Glossary of tensor theory
- Curvature tensor (disambiguation)
- Stress tensor (disambiguation)
- Tense (disambiguation)
