= Future tense (disambiguation) =

In linguistics, a future tense is a verb form that marks the event described by a verb as not having happened yet, but expected to in the future.

Future tense may also refer to:

== Books ==
- Future: Tense: The Coming World Order, a 2004 book by Canadian journalist and author Gwynne Dyer
- Future Tense, a science fiction anthology edited by Kendell Foster Crossen

== Music ==
- "Future Tense", a song by the Matches from their 2008 album A Band in Hope
- Future Tense (album), a 2008 album by Apologetix

== Radio ==
- Future Tense (American radio show), hosted by John Moe and originally by Jon Gordon, renamed Marketplace Tech Report
- Future Tense (Australian radio show), hosted by Antony Funnell on Radio National
- Future Tense (Irish radio show), a former program on RTE Radio 1 hosted by Ella McSweeney

== Television ==
- "Future Tense" (Dawson's Creek), a 2000 episode
- "Future Tense" (Gargoyles), a 1996 episode
- "Future Tense" The Loud House, a 2017 episode
- "Future Tense" (Star Trek: Enterprise), a 2003 episode
- "Future Tense" (Swamp Thing), a 1992 episode

== Other uses ==
- Future Tense (film), a 2026 film by Jenna Bass

== See also ==
- Past Tense (disambiguation)
- Present Tense (disambiguation)
