= AP Art and Design =

Advanced Placement course family

Logos of AP Art and Design as of 2025

AP 2-D Art and Design

AP 3-D Art and Design

AP Drawing

Advanced Placement (AP) Art and Design, formerly known as AP Studio Art, is a series of courses offered by the College Board as part of its Advanced Placement program. AP Art and Design is divided into three categories: 2-D Art and Design, 3-D Art and Design, and Drawing.

== Portfolio ==
Unlike traditional AP exams that utilize a multiple-choice section, free response section, and occasionally an audio section, the AP Art & Design Exam is a portfolio that contains two categories: selected works and sustained investigation. The selected works are 5 pieces that are selected by the student for their quality alone. The sustained investigation is a series of 15 slides put together by the student that contain a strong theme around the artwork created. The sustained investigation contains an additional written portion where the student must explain the both their theme for the portfolio and provide evidence for practice, experimentation, and revision throughout. Selected works are graded completely separately from the sustained investigation. Depending on the AP Art & Design exam the student is taking, the components for each of the categories and what is required for a high score will vary. Regardless of the exam, all AP Art & Design portfolios have to be turned in by a set date and time.

== AP 2-D Art and Design ==
AP 2-D Art and Design deals with two-dimensional applications such as graphic design, photography, weaving, and collage. Contrary to AP Studio Art Drawing, focus is applied on the design itself instead of the composition of the artwork.

=== Portfolio ===
- Section I: Quality: A student submits 5 actual artwork that represents the student's quality of designing pieces in 2D.
- Section II: Concentration: A student submits 12 different slides that demonstrate the student's ability to make a variety of pieces in 2D that relate to one idea. These are arranged in a special order on slide coverings from College Board. Starting in 2009, an online application replaced the use of physical slides and associated documents.
- Section III: Breadth: A student submits 12 additional and different slides that demonstrate the student's ability to incorporate 2D design principles that include unity/variety, balance, emphasis, contrast, rhythm, repetition, proportion/scale, and figure-ground relationship. These are arranged similar to Section II. Starting 2009, an online application replaced the use of physical slides and associated documents.

=== Grade distribution ===
Year	1	2	3	4	5	% of scores 3 or higher	Mean score	Standard deviation	Number of students
2007	5.30%	27.40%	34.80%	21.30%	11.10%	67.30%	3.06	1.07	13,410
2008	5.60%	26.40%	33.50%	21.90%	12.60%	68.00%	3.10	1.10	15,478
2009	4.40%	27.10%	32.60%	23.50%	12.40%	68.50%	3.12	1.08	17,387
2010	4.20%	25.40%	32.70%	26.40%	11.30%	70.40%	3.15	1.06	20,699
2011	4.10%	23.60%	34.60%	25.60%	12.10%	72.30%	3.18	1.05	21,765
2012	3.90%	21.20%	32.10%	28.50%	14.30%	74.80%	3.28	1.07	23,591
2013	3.10%	17.70%	34.40%	31.30%	13.40%	79.10%	3.34	1.02	24,928
2014	3.20%	18.30%	35.10%	29.50%	13.90%	78.50%	3.33	1.03	26,811
2015	4.30%	17.40%	32.30%	28.70%	17.20%	78.20%	3.37	1.09	27,999
2016	2.20%	15.50%	35.00%	33.00%	14.40%	82.40%	3.42	0.99	30,925
2017	1.80%	13.10%	34.60%	31.20%	19.30%	85.10%	3.53	1.00	32,732
2018	3.20%	12.20%	35.80%	30.90%	17.90%	84.60%	3.48	1.02	36,249
2019	2.80%	10.80%	34.00%	31.50%	21.00%	86.40%	3.57	1.02	37,749
2020	0.60%	9.80%	41.30%	36.10%	12.10%	89.50%	3.49	0.85	36,901
2021	0.40%	12.50%	42.30%	34.70%	10.20%	87.10%	3.42	0.85	34,509
2022	0.50%	12.80%	40.30%	35.50%	10.80%	86.60%	3.43	0.87	37,045
2023	2.00%	14.40%	40.70%	31.50%	11.50%	83.60%	3.36	0.93	43,854
2024	3.20%	14.00%	42.80%	28.80%	11.20%	82.80%	3.31	0.95	47,902
2025	3.30%	13.70%	41.80%	29.30%	11.90%	83.00%	3.33	0.96	48,279
2026	9.0%	12.0%	43.0%	30.0%	12.0%	85.0%			50,000

== AP 3-D Art and Design ==
AP 3-D Art and Design is a three-dimensional (3-D) art course that holds many similarities to the 2-D course. The course deals with 3-D artistic applications such as metalworking, sculpture, computer models, and ceramics. Like AP Studio Art 2D, the focus is on the design of the artwork itself as opposed to its composition.

=== Portfolio ===
- Section I: Quality: The actual work for this exam is three-dimensional and not flat, so transporting it directly to The College Board could cause damage to the artwork and the pieces would most likely not fit in portfolios. Because of this, five pieces of artwork are shown in ten slides to showcase the quality of the student's three-dimensional pieces.
- Section II: Concentration: 12 different slides are submitted to demonstrate the student's ability to produce a variety of pieces that relate to a single idea. The slides are arranged in slide coverings in an order designated by The College Board. Starting in 2009, an online application replaced the use of physical slides and associated documents, and the student was allowed to determine the order of the works in their concentration.
- Section III: Breadth: Eight different works are shown in 16 slides which are meant to demonstrate the student's ability to incorporate a variety of different 3D Design principles, including unity/variety, balance, emphasis, contrast, rhythm, repetition, proportion/scale, and figure/ground relationship. Similar to Section II, this section's slides are also arranged in an order designated by The College Board. Starting 2009, an online application replaced the use of physical slides and associated documents.

=== Grade distribution ===
In the 2012 administration, 3,840 students took the exam with a mean score of 3.00.

Year	1	2	3	4	5	% of scores 3 or higher	Mean score	Standard deviation	Number of students
2007	7.50%	28.70%	40.30%	14.00%	9.60%	63.90%	2.90	1.05	2,320
2008	8.30%	29.70%	37.40%	14.70%	9.80%	62.00%	2.88	1.07	2,468
2009	7.00%	31.10%	37.20%	15.60%	9.10%	61.90%	2.89	1.05	2,761
2010	6.90%	30.90%	35.30%	16.80%	10.20%	62.30%	2.93	1.07	3,182
2011	6.90%	31.60%	33.40%	18.10%	10.10%	61.50%	2.93	1.08	3,406
2012	6.10%	28.50%	34.60%	20.40%	10.30%	65.40%	3.00	1.07	3,840
2013	5.90%	26.30%	37.60%	19.40%	10.90%	67.80%	3.03	1.06	4,167
2014	4.80%	27.70%	36.80%	19.60%	11.00%	67.50%	3.04	1.05	4,256
2015	3.30%	24.70%	36.00%	23.60%	12.30%	72.00%	3.17	1.04	4,590
2016	2.90%	22.30%	35.80%	25.70%	13.20%	74.80%	3.24	1.03	5,051
2017	3.20%	25.20%	37.60%	22.00%	12.00%	71.60%	3.15	1.03	5,571
2018	4.40%	26.60%	34.00%	23.50%	11.40%	69.00%	3.11	1.06	5,777
2019	4.30%	25.70%	37.50%	22.40%	10.00%	70.00%	3.08	1.02	6,040
2020	3.50%	20.90%	36.50%	31.90%	7.20%	75.60%	3.18	0.96	5,281
2021	3.70%	24.90%	36.30%	28.60%	6.50%	71.40%	3.09	0.97	4,573
2022	2.60%	23.80%	38.50%	28.60%	6.50%	73.60%	3.12	0.93	5,377
2023	4.40%	23.50%	39.90%	25.20%	7.10%	72.10%	3.07	0.97	7,505
2024	4.70%	23.40%	41.40%	24.30%	6.20%	72.00%	3.04	0.95	9,180
2025	3.90%	24.50%	39.90%	24.90%	6.70%	71.60%	3.06	0.96	7,375
2026	2.0%	23.0%	43.0%	25.0%	7.0%	75.0%			10,500

== AP Drawing ==
AP Drawing deals with basic painting and drawing. Focus is applied on the composition of the different lines/colors/shape/etc... of the painting instead of the design itself. Originally called AP Studio Art, it was later changed to AP Studio Art Drawing.

=== Portfolio ===
- Section I: Quality: A student submits 5 actual artwork to the AP College Board that represent the student's quality of technique and their design concepts.
- Section II: Concentration: A student submits 12 different slides that demonstrate the student's ability to paint and draw a variety of pieces that relate to one idea. These are arranged in a special order on slide coverings from College Board. Starting in 2009, an online application replaced the use of physical slides and associated documents.
- Section III: Breadth: A student submits 12 additional and different slides that demonstrate the student's ability to incorporate drawing techniques and issues that include drawing from observation, work with inverted or nonobjective forms, effective use of light and shade, line quality, surface manipulation, composition, various spatial systems, and expressive mark-making. There are arranged similar to Section II. Starting 2009, an online application replaced the use of physical slides and associated documents.

=== Grade distribution ===
In the 2016 administration, 18,407 students took the exam with 21 students earning a perfect score of 72/72.

Year	1	2	3	4	5	% of scores 3 or higher	Mean score	Standard deviation	Number of students
2007	6.00%	26.20%	37.20%	18.20%	12.40%	67.80%	3.05	1.09	13,558
2008	5.60%	26.90%	36.40%	17.50%	13.50%	67.50%	3.06	1.10	14,120
2009	4.40%	26.40%	37.50%	18.10%	13.60%	69.20%	3.10	1.07	14,589
2010	4.30%	23.10%	38.90%	19.30%	14.40%	72.60%	3.16	1.07	15,027
2011	5.10%	23.20%	41.50%	17.50%	12.70%	71.70%	3.09	1.05	16,266
2012	4.30%	22.30%	38.60%	20.90%	13.90%	73.40%	3.18	1.06	16,188
2013	2.70%	18.90%	42.70%	20.40%	15.30%	78.50%	3.27	1.02	16,597
2014	3.50%	19.00%	40.60%	20.90%	16.00%	77.50%	3.27	1.05	16,928
2015	3.30%	18.50%	40.40%	22.20%	15.60%	78.10%	3.28	1.04	18,105
2016	2.40%	14.60%	38.80%	27.20%	17.00%	82.90%	3.42	1.01	18,407
2017	1.60%	12.90%	35.80%	27.70%	21.90%	85.50%	3.56	1.02	19,957
2018	1.40%	9.00%	35.50%	31.70%	22.40%	89.50%	3.65	0.97	20,853
2019	1.10%	7.80%	37.00%	33.30%	20.80%	91.10%	3.65	0.93	21,769
2020	1.20%	9.80%	33.20%	40.30%	15.50%	89.10%	3.59	0.90	20,486
2021	1.40%	12.40%	34.30%	37.70%	14.20%	86.20%	3.51	0.93	18,096
2022	1.30%	10.20%	35.50%	38.30%	14.70%	88.30%	3.54	0.91	19,210
2023	2.10%	13.10%	36.10%	32.90%	15.70%	84.80%	3.47	0.98	22,555
2024	2.70%	13.50%	37.60%	31.10%	15.10%	83.80%	3.42	0.99	22,882
2025	3.20%	12.60%	35.60%	31.50%	17.10%	84.20%	3.47	1.02	23,107
2026	3.0%	14.0%	36.0%	31.0%	16.0%	83.0%			23.000
