= Eminence =

Eminence may refer to:

== Places in the United States ==
- Eminence, Arkansas, a place in Arkansas
- Eminence, Indiana
- Eminence, Kansas
- Eminence, Kentucky
- Eminence, Mississippi, in Covington County, Mississippi
- Eminence, Missouri
- Eminence, New York, a place in New York
- Eminence Township, Logan County, Illinois

== Arts and entertainment ==
- Eminence (novel), a 1998 novel by Morris West
- "Eminence" (Star Wars: The Clone Wars), a 2013 TV episode
- Eminence Symphony Orchestra, based in Sydney, Australia
- Eminence, an electronic music duo, contributors to the 2018 Notaker EP Erebus I
- Eminence, in the Marvel Cinematic Universe, a Watcher

== Other uses ==
- Eminence (anatomy), a variety of structures
- Eminence (style), a pre-nominal honorific used for high nobility and clergy
- Eminence (yacht), built in 2008
- The Eminence, a historic estate house in Auburndale, Newton, Massachusetts, U.S.

== See also ==
- Eminent (disambiguation)
- Imminence (disambiguation)
- Prominence (disambiguation)
- "Eminence Front", a 1982 song by The Who
- Éminence grise, powerful advisor or decision-maker who operates secretly or unofficially
- Immanence, the divine encompasses or is manifested in the material world.
