= Present Tense (disambiguation) =

The present tense is a grammatical tense.

Present Tense may also refer to:

== Music ==
- Present Tense (band), a Las Vegas band

=== Albums ===
- Present Tense (Sagittarius album), 1968
- Present Tense (James Carter album), 2008
- Present Tense (Wild Beasts album), 2014
- Present Tense, 1979 album by the American rock band Shoes
- Present Tense, 1990 album by Joe Locke, and the title song
- Present Tense, 1992 album by Bobby Watson, and the title song
- Present Tense (Lenny White album), 1995
- Present Tense, 1996 album by José Feliciano
- Present Tense, 2015 album by Any Trouble

=== Songs ===
- "Present Tense", on 1996 album No Code by Pearl Jam
- "Present Tense", on 2016 album A Moon Shaped Pool by Radiohead
- "The Present Tense", on 2000 album My Favourite Headache, by Geddy Lee

== Television ==
- "Present Tense" (Arrow), a 2019 episode
- "Present Tense", a season 4 episode of The Loud House
- "Present Tense" (Mork & Mindy), a 1982 episode

== Other uses ==
- Present Tense (magazine), of Jewish affairs, 1973–1990

== See also ==
- "Preset Tense", a song on 2017 album From Deewee by Soulwax
- Future tense (disambiguation)
- Past tense (disambiguation)
