= Jean Besancenot =

French painter, documentary photographer and ethnographer (1902-1992)

- Born: Jean Girard; 24 September 1902; Estrées-Saint-Denis, France
- Died: 27 July 1992 (aged 89); Bry-sur-Marne, France
- Occupations: painter, documentary photographer, ethnographer
- Years active: 1930s to 1992
- Known for: Paintings and photographs of Moroccan traditional costumes

Jean Besancenot, (French pronunciation: [ʒã bɘzãsɘ.no]; 24 September 1902 – 27 July 1992), born Jean Girard, was a French painter, documentary photographer, and self-trained ethnographer, active mainly during the 1930s and 1940s in the French protectorate in Morocco.

He is mainly known for his illustrated book Costumes du Maroc with ethnographic information and portrait paintings of Moroccans in traditional costumes and other personal adornment, published first in French in 1942. The first ethnographic information on Moroccan fashion, it has been called an "iconic" work of lasting influence on traditional Moroccan garments and how they were worn. Besides several editions in French, an English translation, Costumes of Morocco, was published in 1990. By 1953, when he published his second major work about select pieces of jewellery in Morocco, Bijoux arabes et berbères du Maroc, he had become Head of the Iconographic Service of the Moroccan Office of Information.

His work, composed of detailed descriptions, numerous black-and-white photographs, films, drawings and paintings, testifies to the history and aesthetics of Moroccan cultural heritage of the 1930s and 1940s, still little marked by Western influences. Because of ongoing reproductions and alterations in publications, by art galleries and fashion designers, his photos and paintings have been called "a form of public domain media for 'traditional' Moroccan dress".

== Biography ==
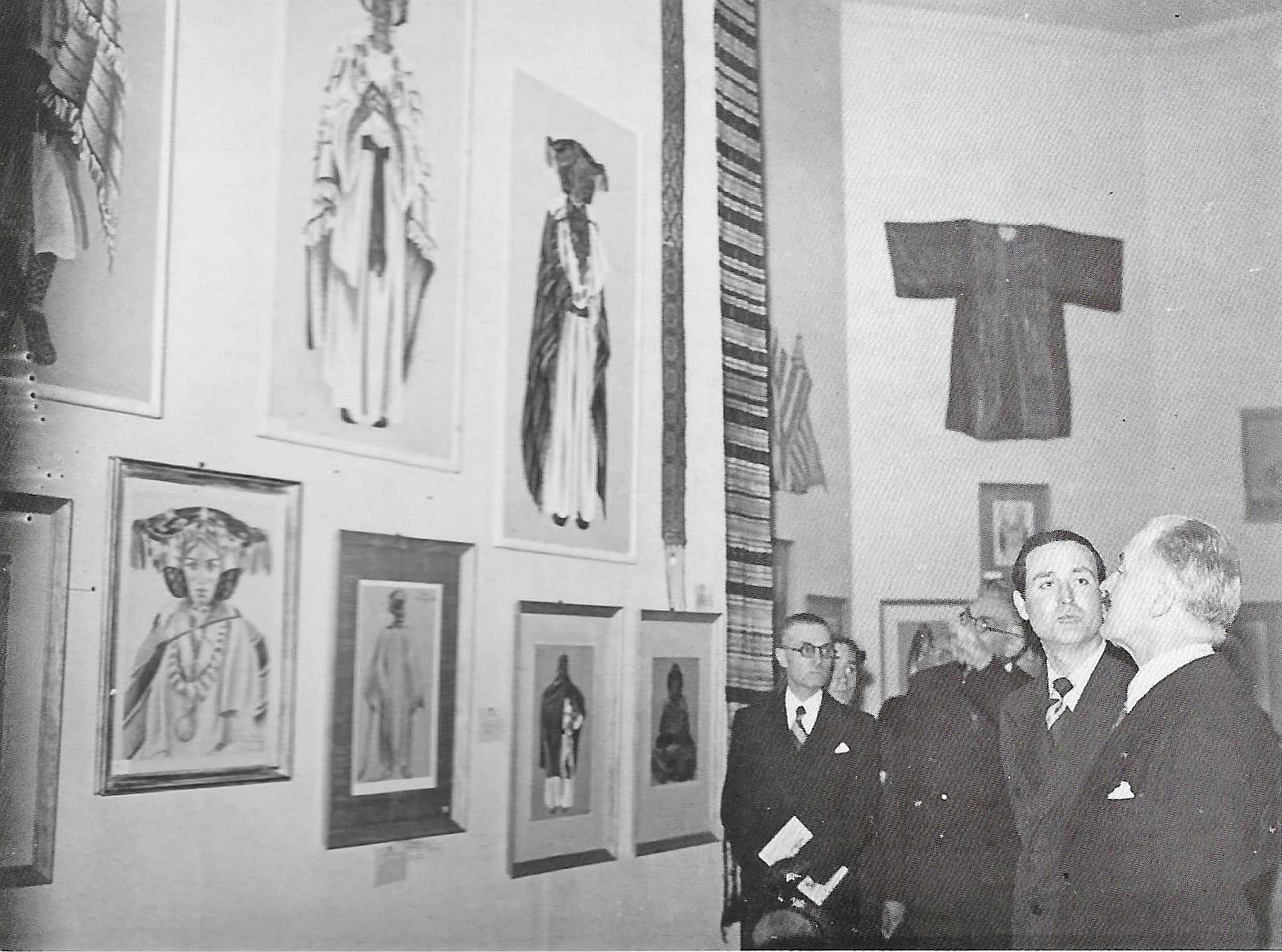
Jean Besancenot and French president Albert Lebrun at the exhibition Types et costumes du Maroc in Paris 1937

Besancenot was born as Jean Girard on 24 September 1902 in Estrées-Saint-Denis of northern France. After his studies at the École des Arts Décoratifs in Paris, he started his career as a painter with an interest in French regional folk costumes.

Commissioned by the administration of the French protectorate in Morocco, he collected ethnographic observations and records of traditional dress and lifestyles during his extensive travels in this country on three visits between 1934 and 1939, as well as during a longer stay between 1940 and 1945. In a small Ford automobile, he journeyed to remote parts of the country, travelling by donkey back in the more remote regions. Although having been warned about the general and gender-specific difficulties of approaching Moroccan people and studying the dress and jewellery of women as a foreigner, his obvious success was attributed to his friendly and sensitive approach. On some of his trips, he was accompanied by his wife, which made access to the world of women easier. At times he managed to gain the support of a communal leader (caïd), who allowed him to take pictures of his wife and children dressed in the traditional way. During his prolonged stay in the medina of Salé between 1940 and 1943, he established close relations with Jewish families in the mellah (Jewish quarter) whose daughters agreed to pose in traditional dress.

In 1945, Besancenot undertook a field trip to the southwestern regions, where he felt like one of the first Frenchmen ever to have visited these regions. During his visits in the Tafilalet, the valleys of the Draa, Dadès and Todgha, in the Anti-Atlas and the Sous region, he completed his earlier studies and took additional notes and photographs. Some of his travel was in remote Jewish Berber communities, which prompted his remark about the small town of Tissint: "I had in front of me a group of human beings who were leading exactly the same kind of life as their ancestors 2000 years ago."

== Ethnographic and artistic works ==
Besancenot first became known for his artistic illustrations and detailed descriptions of traditional folk costumes and other forms of personal adornment, including the jewellery of the Berber cultures in Morocco.

=== Costumes et types du Maroc (1942) ===
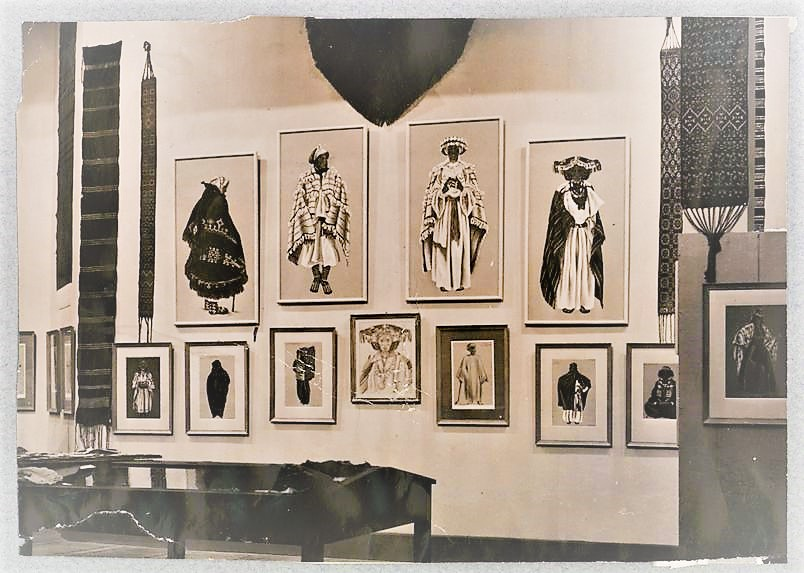
View of the exhibition Types et costumes du Maroc in Paris 1937

For his illustrated book Costumes du Maroc (1942), he identified three basic categories of costumes: rural Berber dress, Jewish dress and urban citizens' costumes, some of which showing influences from Arab culture. Moreover, each of the portraits of his 60 gouache paintings was attributed to a specific social role (married woman, palace guard, musician etc.), city or region, and Berber dress also assigned to corresponding tribal groups. His artistic portraits on a white background show more women than men (43 and 17 respectively), most of them in elaborate dress that the author found "the most beautiful or at least most representative".

As these forms of dress were still very much current and differentiated in the 1930s, Besancenot remarked that in rural areas, each type of dress represented a tribal identity. Commenting on the different forms of Moroccan dress, he drew special emphasis to the draped garments, especially common in rural communities, and to the more urban traditions of the so-called Arab dress of Moorish and Near Eastern origin. In more than 100 detailed comments on the different kinds of dress, he observed that urban people differ very clearly by their costume from the rural populations. Even so, he observed some fundamental pieces of clothing like the djellaba and the burnous in both groups. In all instances, he saw a different appearance according to the changing quality of the fabrics, as well as in the ways the same kind of garment was worn. He noted further that "the Moroccan excels in communicating extremely varied expressions by his dress. The art of wearing it plays an important role here."

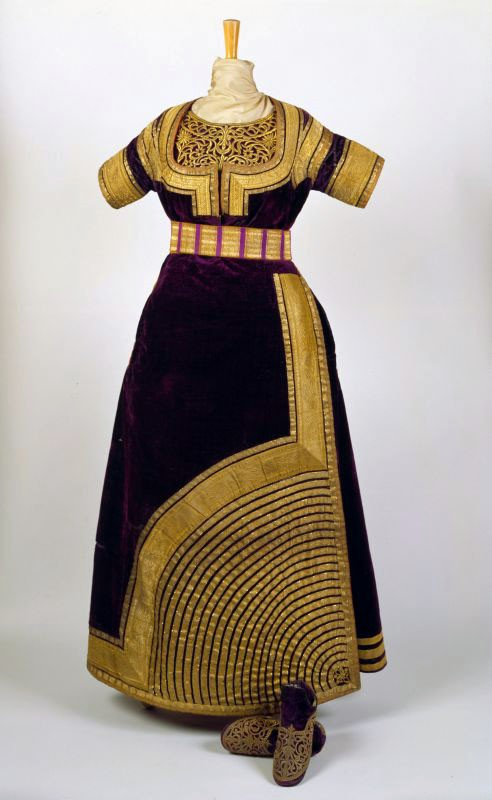
Jewish wedding dress, similar to image 51 in Costumes du Maroc

With regard to the two groups of Moroccan Jews, he presented Jewish brides of Rabat and Fes in their ceremonial dress, as well as an urban gentleman, all representative of the Sephardic communities. The other group of Jewish Moroccans, who had lived in the country since ancient times and were part of the Berber population, was represented by ornately dressed women and a boy of the southern regions.

Besancenot's artistic full size colour portraits could not render sufficient detail of hair styles, shoes or how to drape loose pieces of textiles, like the urban haik or Berber draped garments. To provide more information, he added explanations and drawings of such elements of dress on separate pages. In detailed drawings, he further described 56 pieces of urban as well as 38 of rural Berber pieces of women's jewellery.

The first edition of Costumes du Maroc was published in 1943 as a special edition of 300 copies with separate facsimile prints of the 60 costumes. Sultan Mohamed V, who opposed the anti-Jewish policy of the Vichy regime in Morocco and later became the first king of Morocco, was one of the first subscribers. A reprint of 350 copies was only produced four years before the author's death in 1988, and an enlarged second edition followed in 2008.

=== Bijoux arabes et berbères du Maroc (1953) ===
In his second major ethnographic work, titled Bijoux arabes et berbères du Maroc, Besancenot published his drawings and descriptions of almost 200 different pieces of so-called Arab and Berber jewellery from various places and traditions in Morocco. Thanks to his artistic training as painter, his drawings highlight the intricate features of the pieces in reduced detail compared to his corresponding photographs.

In the introduction to his drawings and explanations, he commented on the origins, social use and meaning of jewellery for the different communities, as well as on the changing tastes of the customers during the first half of the 20th century. With reference to the origins of Berber jewellery, he presumed influences of ancient Mediterranean traditions as well as of the caravan routes crossing the Sahara and of historical Roman and Carthaginian styles in the Maghreb. While he considered Near Eastern Arab jewellery of little influence, he stressed the importance of the medieval art of Al-Andalus on urban as well as rural (Berber) styles of jewellery. Referring to the respective clients and their tastes, he stated the general rule: Urban jewellery was usually made of gold and other adornments, and pieces for rural Berber clients were almost exclusively made of silver, both with many local variations in shape, usage and attachments of other elements. As jewellery has been an important part of a woman's dowry in the Maghreb, he further observed:

The adornment of the bride during the week of the wedding is composed of such a quantity of jewellery that only very rich families could offer it to the bride. For the less wealthy families, the negagefs [sic], women specialized in this kind of trade, rented their services for the duration of the wedding ceremonies, along with sumptuous clothes and especially the enormous quantity of jewels deemed essential for the bride to appear with honour and adorned like an idol before her friends, assembled in admiring curiosity.

— Jean Besancenot, Bijoux arabes et berbères du Maroc

In contrast to these urban traditions, Besancenot acknowledged the harsh living conditions of rural women, marked by all kinds of domestic chores like fetching water, grinding cereals, preparing food etc. He observed their similar taste for elaborate and often heavy silver jewellery. To hold simple sheets of cloth together as a draped garment, for example, the characteristic fibula brooches were a necessity, and women often wore their full set of jewellery during their daily activities. He also observed that the adornment consisted of a set of jewellery that was in principle exactly the same for each woman of a given tribal group. This uniformity began to change from the beginning of the 20th century, when these jewels still constituted "a tribal mark as certain as the women's tattoos or the patterns of the woollen blankets worn on their shoulders". Apart from weddings and other crucial events in a family's life, important occasions for women to dress in their best jewellery, make-up, hairstyle and clothes were social events like the communal dances (ahidus and ahwash).

With regard to the cultural meaning of different pieces of jewellery, Besancenot claimed that the basic forms and their decoration originally expressed symbolic messages. Even if such original messages had been lost over time, there were forms whose particular value remained well known to all members of the community. As a case in point, he referred to the same beliefs of Muslim as well as Jewish Berber women that it was necessary to protect oneself from the powers of evil, to ward off bad luck and to avail oneself of beneficial influences through jewellery worn as amulets. Moreover, in rural areas as well as in the cities, Besancenot had observed Moroccans believing in superstition and black magic.

Referring to interpretations of Berber motifs as archetypal forms with protective features that have been traced to pre-Islamic times by colonial-era ethnologists such as Gabriel Camps, art historian Cynthia Becker cautioned that the notion of an "unconscious, millennia-old “Berberness” fails "to consider the subtle social encounters and negotiations that influence artistic production."

At the end of his introduction to Bijoux arabes et berbères du Maroc, Besancenot deplored the fact that the production of traditional jewellery had been abandoned or bastardized to the point of no longer being recognizable, as light-weight and quickly made modern pieces were being favoured by local customers. Reacting to these changes, museums in Marrakesh, Rabat, Meknes and Fes had already started to collect these vanishing traditions of Moroccan jewellery.

== Ethnographic photography ==
Besancenot was originally a painter, who had learned to use photography as a means of quickly capturing his ethnographic impressions. In an interview with the journalist Dominique Carré, he commented on his approach: "I wanted to prove that scientists very often pursue their investigations in a frame of mind that partially leaves aside the aesthetic aspect. [...] They thoroughly study a number of things, but often neglect the aspects of traditional arts that contain a very important aesthetic value. I wanted to restore this value."

In the context of the movement of French ethnologists at the beginning of the 20th century, led by Paul Rivet (1876-1958) and Marcel Mauss (1872-1950), with whom Besancenot briefly studied in 1937/38, he used photography not only as an instrument to record the location and the subjects, but also as an artistic expression in its own right, marked by the interested gaze of its author. While the persons in many of his photographs were deliberately posing to present their dress and jewellery, others appear in a more natural context, for example Berber women weaving a carpet or dancing at a traditional ahwash performance. In addition to these pictures, Besancenot also took photographs of Moroccan landscapes and city scenes, for example in Marrakesh.

Based on his knowledge of Morocco, Besancenot was called upon in 1956 to write the geographical, historical and archaeological notes for the Hachette World Album Maroc, with photographs by Jacques Belin and Gabriel Gillet and an introduction by Moroccan novelist Ahmed Sefrioui. He also cooperated with the ethnographic Musée de l'Homme, whose collection later was incorporated into the Musée du quai Branly, and donated more than 500 photographs and several costumes from his private collection that are now accessible in the museum's online archive.

According to a short remark by the House of Photography of Marrakesh, Besancenot further filmed numerous scenes from the life of Jewish Berbers together with Samuel-Aaron "Zédé" Schulmann (1890-1983), who himself left a large number of photographs documenting Jewish life in Morocco.

== Final years ==
Towards the end of his life, Besancenot experienced financial difficulties and supplemented his income by selling new prints of his Moroccan photos, signed and accompanied by his ethnographic explanations. He retired to the National House of Artists in Nogent-sur-Marne near Paris and died at the age of 89 on 27 July, 1992, in Bry-sur-Marne.

== Exhibitions, publications and art history ==
=== Recognition in Morocco ===
In Morocco, the work of Besancenot has been recognised by a series of postage stamps, in newspapers and through the new edition of his Bijoux arabes et berbères du Maroc" (Arabic and Berber jewellery of Morocco) in 2001. Costumes du Maroc was published in Arabic by the Ministry of Culture in 2004, and in 2018, the House of Photography in Marrakesh presented an exhibition of his photographs with an accompanying booklet.

=== Recognition in other countries ===
As early as 1937, an exhibition of his paintings and sketches titled "Types et costumes du Maroc: peintures et dessins de Jean Besancenot" was shown in the Musée de la France d'Outre-Mer in Paris, a museum presenting life in the French colonies. In 1947, the art gallery of the Christofle jewellers in Paris organized an exhibition of Berber jewellery and other metalwork made for male customers, such as ornate powder flasks or daggers under the title Bijoux berbères du Maroc, for which Besancenot contributed the text of the booklet as well as photographs and metalwork from his collection.

For the 1948 French movie Les Noces du Sable (Desert Wedding), Besancenot co-wrote the scenario together with film director André Swobada, with a commentary on this Moroccan folk tale written and read by Jean Cocteau.

In 1984, the Institut du monde arabe in Paris acquired nearly 1800 items from his archives, including his photographic negatives and documents. Each photograph is accompanied by a descriptive sheet containing the technical description of the costumes or ornaments, with explanations about the ethnic and geographical origin of the pictures. Some of these photographs have been published in works about the traditional culture of Morocco, such as Splendeurs du Maroc and Berber memories: women and jewellery in Morocco through the Gillion Crowet Collections. From December 1988 to March 1989, the Musée des Arts Africains et Océaniens in Paris showed an exhibition of Besancenot's paintings from the book Costumes du Maroc.

In 1986, the Israel Museum in Jerusalem presented the exhibition Jewish life in Morocco. Arts and traditions. For the accompanying book, Besancenot wrote two chapters on costumes and jewellery, illustrated by his earlier photographs and drawings. In 2020, Sotheby's auction house sold a lot of fifty-five recent photographic silver prints of portraits from Morocco, with explanations, signed and dated by Besancenot. At the 2021 Paris Photo art fair, some of Besancenot's photographs of Berber women were exhibited and counted among the "Ten Unmissable Highlights".

From 30 June 2020 to 02 May 2021, an exhibition with his photographs of Moroccan Jews was presented at the Museum for Jewish Art and History in Paris. Referring to his important documentation of urban and rural Jewish communities in Morocco before their exodus after the 1950s, the museum wrote:

Jean Besancenot particularly explored Morocco's southernmost regions, little affected by westernisation, where Jewish communities, sometimes present since Antiquity, intermingled with the Berber population. Taken during the French protectorate, his photographs show the close proximity to his subjects that enabled him to combine both aesthetic and scientific concerns. They are an irreplaceable testimony to Jewish culture in Morocco, particularly female costumes and jewellery, whose forms are sometimes the same as those of Muslim women.

— Musée d'art et de l'histoire du Judaisme, Jews in Morocco, 1934-1937. Photographs by Jean Besancenot

=== Recognition in art history ===
In her article about the ongoing importance of Costumes of Morocco in post-colonial ethnography and contemporary Moroccan concepts of traditional dress, social anthropologist Claire Nicholas of Princeton University discussed his paintings, personal notes and published comments. She called his book the "most ambitious and systematic undertaking of its kind in relation to Moroccan dress. It stands today as one of the most important references for the iconography, terminology, and descriptions of 'traditional' Moroccan dress." On a critical note, she commented on his perception that Berber draped garments were a "continuation of millennium-old traditions of the ancient Mediterranean races" and judged these ideas as common, stereotypical notions of all the scholars of his time. Nevertheless, she acknowledged his "sensitivity to the problematic nature of constructing costume and human 'types', and a remarkable attentiveness to ongoing changes in Moroccan society".

Referring to contemporary reproductions and variations of his photos and paintings that she observed in Moroccan art galleries, tourist shops and publications, she found that his images "have become a form of public domain media for traditional Moroccan dress. In many cases Besancenot's name is never mentioned; the images are taken to stand for themselves." Further, references to his scholarly and artistic work have been "taken up by academics, curators, Moroccan fashion designers, commercial institutions, and Moroccan artists", and they "influence the social imaginary, both Moroccan and foreign, in so far as it constitutes a visual vocabulary of traditional Moroccan garments and how they were worn".

== Works ==
- Costumes et types du Maroc illustrés de soixante gouaches reproduites en facsimile et en camaïeu. Paris: Horizons de France. 1942. New edition Costumes du Maroc. Aix-en-Provence, France: Edisud. 1988. ISBN 9782857443575.
- Costumes du Maroc (Second, revised and enlarged ed.). Aix-en-Provence: Edisud. 2008. ISBN 9782744902185.
- English edition translated by Caroline Stone (1990). Costumes of Morocco. London: Kegan Paul International. 1990. ISBN 9780710303592.
- Bijoux arabes et berbères du Maroc: 40 planches comprenant 193 modèles de bijoux, dessinés et commentés. Casablanca: Ed. de la Cigogne. 1953. New edition Casablanca: Éditions Frontispice, 2001, ISBN 9789954026724
- and Sefrioui, Ahmed (1956). Maroc. Photographies de Jacques Belin et Gabriel Gillet. Geographical, historical and archaeological notes by Jean Besancenot. Paris: Hachette.

== Bibliography ==
- Alaoui, Rachida (2003). Costumes et parures du Maroc (in French). Courbevoie, Paris: ACR Edition. ISBN 978-2-86770-161-0. OCLC 53845208.
- Assouline, Hannah; Carré, Dominique, eds. (2020). Juifs du Maroc: Photographies de Jean Besancenot, 1934-1937 [Jews of Morocco. Photographs by Jean Besancenot, 1934-1937]. Paris: Musée d'art et d'histoire du judaïsme. ISBN 9782711878413.
- Becker, Cynthia (2010). "Deconstructing the history of Berber arts: tribalism, matriarchy and a primitive Neolithic past". In Hoffman, Katherine E.; Miller, Susan Gilson (eds.). Berbers and others: Beyond tribe and nation in the Maghrib. Bloomington: Indiana University Press. pp. 195–220. ISBN 978-0-253-35480-8.
- Draguet, Michel; de Merode, Nathalie (2020). Berber memories: women and jewellery in Morocco through the Gillion Crowet Collections. Brussels: Mercatorfonds. ISBN 978-0-300-25395-5.
- Grammet, Ivo; de Meersman, Min, eds. (1998). Splendeurs du Maroc. Tervuren: Musée royal de l'Afrique centrale. ISBN 90-75894-14-7.
- Jansen, M. Angela (2022). ""There was no fashion in Morocco before.": (Re-)creating contemporary Moroccan fashion history". In JoAnn McGregor; Heather M. Akou; Nicola Stylianou (eds.). Creating African Fashion Histories: Politics, Museums, and Sartorial Practices. Indiana University Press. pp. 187–210. ISBN 978-0-253-06014-3.
- Miller, Susan Gilson (2013). A history of modern Morocco. New York: Cambridge University Press. ISBN 978-0-521-81070-8. OCLC 855022840.
- Muller-Lancet, Aviva; Champault, Dominique; Israel Museum, eds. (1986). La Vie juive au Maroc. Arts et Traditions. Tel Aviv: Editions Stavit.
- La Maison de la Photographie (2018) Jean Besancenot 1924-1992. Marrakesh: La Maison de la Photographie, Les Editions Limitées.
- Nicholas, Claire (2014). "Of texts and textiles ...: colonial ethnography and contemporary Moroccan material heritage". The Journal of North African Studies. 19 (3): 390–412. doi:10.1080/13629387.2014.897621. S2CID 144224109.
- Rabaté, Marie-Rose; Sorber, Frieda (2009). Costumes berbères du Maroc: décors traditionnels - Berber costumes of Morocco: traditional patterns (in French and English). Paris: ACR Éditions. ISBN 9782867701856. OCLC 255026428.

== See also ==
- Jewellery of the Berber cultures
- Culture of Morocco - Carpets, dress and jewellery
- History of clothing and textiles
