= Stress testing (disambiguation) =

Stress testing or stress test is a form of deliberately intense or thorough testing.

It may also refer to:

== Techniques ==
- Cardiac stress test, a medical testing procedure to evaluate heart function
- Stress analysis, methods for computing mechanical stress
- Trier social stress test, a procedure used to induce stress in human research participants
- Voice stress analysis, sometimes called a voice stress test

== Works ==
- Stress Test (book), a book by former United States Secretary of the Treasury Timothy Geithner
- "Stress Test", a 1990 episode of The Raccoons
- "Stress Test", a season 1 episode of The Casagrandes
