= Stress tensor (disambiguation) =

Stress tensor is a representation of mechanical stress at every point within a deformed 3D object.

It may also refer to:

- Piola–Kirchhoff stress tensor, in continuum mechanics
- Viscous stress tensor, in continuum mechanics
- Maxwell stress tensor, in electromagnetism

== See also ==
- Stress deviator tensor, in classical physics
- Stress–energy tensor, in relativistic theories
- Electromagnetic stress–energy tensor, in relativistic physics

== See also ==
- Stress (disambiguation)
- Tensor (disambiguation)
- Stress measures
