= Timothy Geithner =

American banker and politician (born 1961)

Tim Geithner
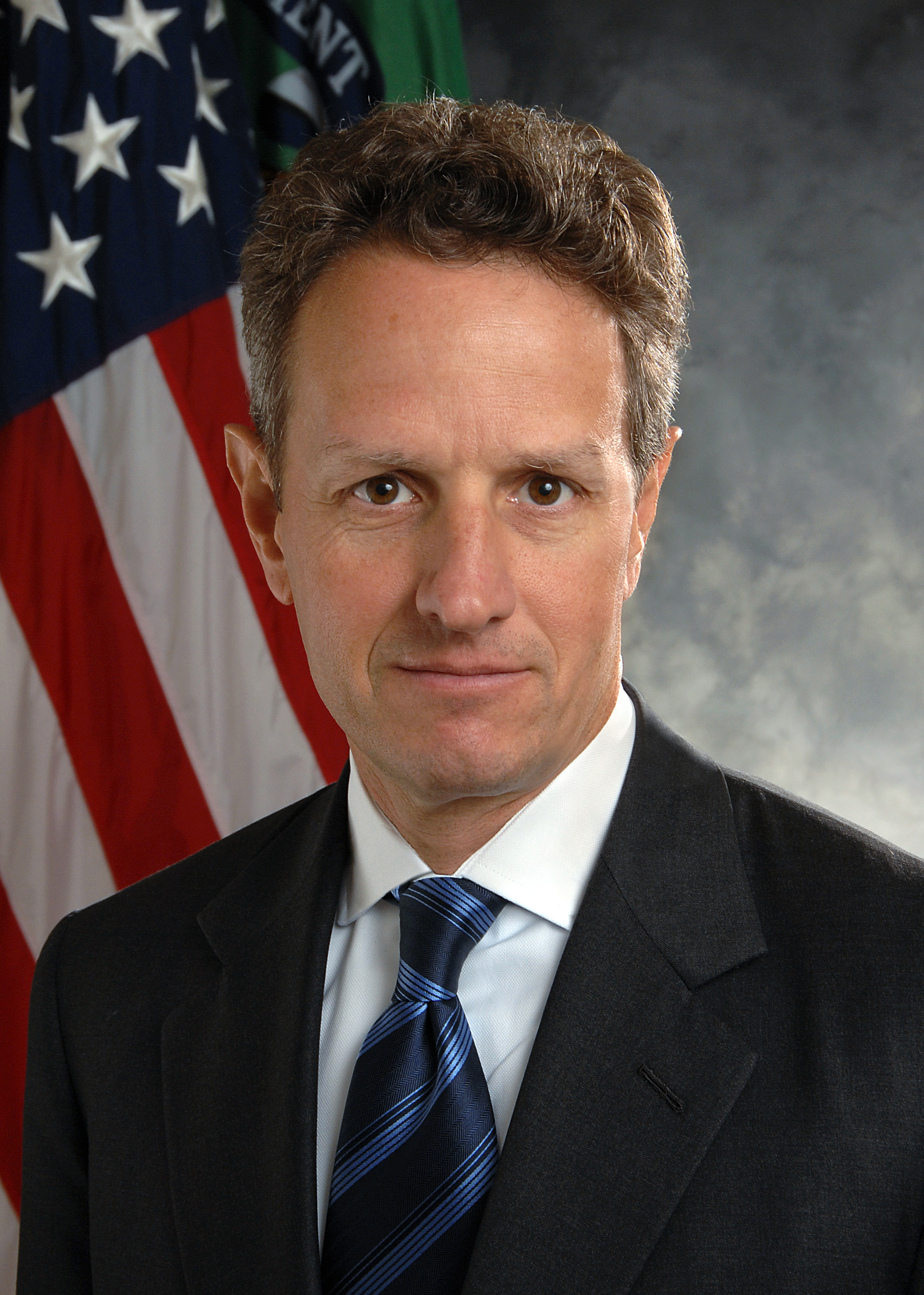
- Official portrait, 2009

75th United States Secretary of the Treasury
- In office January 26, 2009 – January 25, 2013
- President: Barack Obama
- Deputy: Neal S. Wolin
- Preceded by: Henry Paulson
- Succeeded by: Jack Lew

9th President of the Federal Reserve Bank of New York
- In office November 17, 2003 – January 26, 2009
- Preceded by: William Joseph McDonough
- Succeeded by: William C. Dudley

Under Secretary of the Treasury for International Affairs
- In office July 3, 1998 – January 20, 2001
- President: Bill Clinton
- Preceded by: David Lipton
- Succeeded by: John B. Taylor

Personal details
- Born: Timothy Franz Geithner; August 18, 1961 (age 65) New York City, U.S.
- Party: Independent
- Spouse: Carole Sonnenfeld (m. 1985)
- Children: 2
- Education: Dartmouth College (BA); Johns Hopkins University (MA)
- Geithner's voice Geithner at a Senate Appropriations subcommittee hearing on the FY2012 Treasury budget request. Recorded April 5, 2011

Timothy Franz Geithner (/ˈɡaɪtnər/; born August 18, 1961) is an American former central banker who served as the 75th United States secretary of the treasury under President Barack Obama from 2009 to 2013. He was the president of the Federal Reserve Bank of New York from 2003 to 2009, following service in the Clinton administration. Since March 2014, he has served as president and chairman of Warburg Pincus, a private equity firm headquartered in New York City.

As President of the New York Fed and Secretary of the Treasury, Geithner had a key role in government efforts to recover from the 2008 financial crisis and the Great Recession. At the New York Fed, Geithner helped manage crises involving Bear Stearns, Lehman Brothers, and the American International Group; as Treasury Secretary, he oversaw allocation of $350 billion under the Troubled Asset Relief Program, enacted during the previous administration in response to the subprime mortgage crisis. Geithner also managed the administration's efforts to restructure regulation of the nation's financial system, attempts to spur recovery of the mortgage market and the automobile industry, demands for protectionism, tax reform, and negotiations with foreign governments on global finance issues.

== Early life ==
Geithner was born in Manhattan, New York City, to Peter Franz Geithner and Deborah Moore. His father, a German American, was the director of the Ford Foundation's Asia program in New York during the 1990s, after working for the United States Agency for International Development in Zambia and Zimbabwe. During the early 1980s, Geithner's father oversaw the Ford Foundation's microfinance programs in Indonesia being developed by Ann Dunham Soetoro, Barack Obama's mother, and they met at least once in Jakarta. Geithner's paternal grandfather, Paul Herman Geithner (1902–1972), immigrated with his parents to the United States in 1908 from Zeulenroda, Germany.

Geithner's mother, a Mayflower descendant, belongs to a New England family. Her father, Charles Frederick Moore, Jr., served as vice-president of public relations for the Ford Motor Company from 1952 to 1964, and advised President Dwight D. Eisenhower, as well as Nelson Rockefeller and George W. Romney, on their respective presidential campaigns. His uncle, Jonathan Moore, served in the departments of Defense, Justice and State, as well as in the United Nations.

Geithner spent most of his childhood living abroad, including in Zimbabwe; Zambia; India; and Thailand, where he completed high school at the International School Bangkok. He studied Mandarin at Peking University in 1981, and at Beijing Normal University in 1982. Like his father, paternal grandfather and uncle; Geithner attended Dartmouth College, graduating in 1983, with an A.B. in Government and Asian studies, then earned a M.A. in international economics and East Asian studies from Johns Hopkins University's School of Advanced International Studies, in 1985. He has also studied Japanese.

== Early career ==
Geithner worked for Kissinger Associates in Washington, D.C., from 1985 to 1988, when he joined the International Affairs division of the U.S. Treasury Department. He served as an attaché at the Embassy of the United States in Tokyo, then as deputy assistant secretary for international monetary and financial policy (1995–1996), senior deputy assistant secretary for international affairs (1996–1997), and assistant secretary for international affairs (1997–1998). He was Under Secretary of the Treasury for International Affairs (1998–2001) under Secretaries Robert Rubin and Lawrence Summers, who are widely considered to have been his mentors. While at the Treasury Department, he helped manage financial crises in Brazil, Mexico, Indonesia, South Korea, and Thailand.

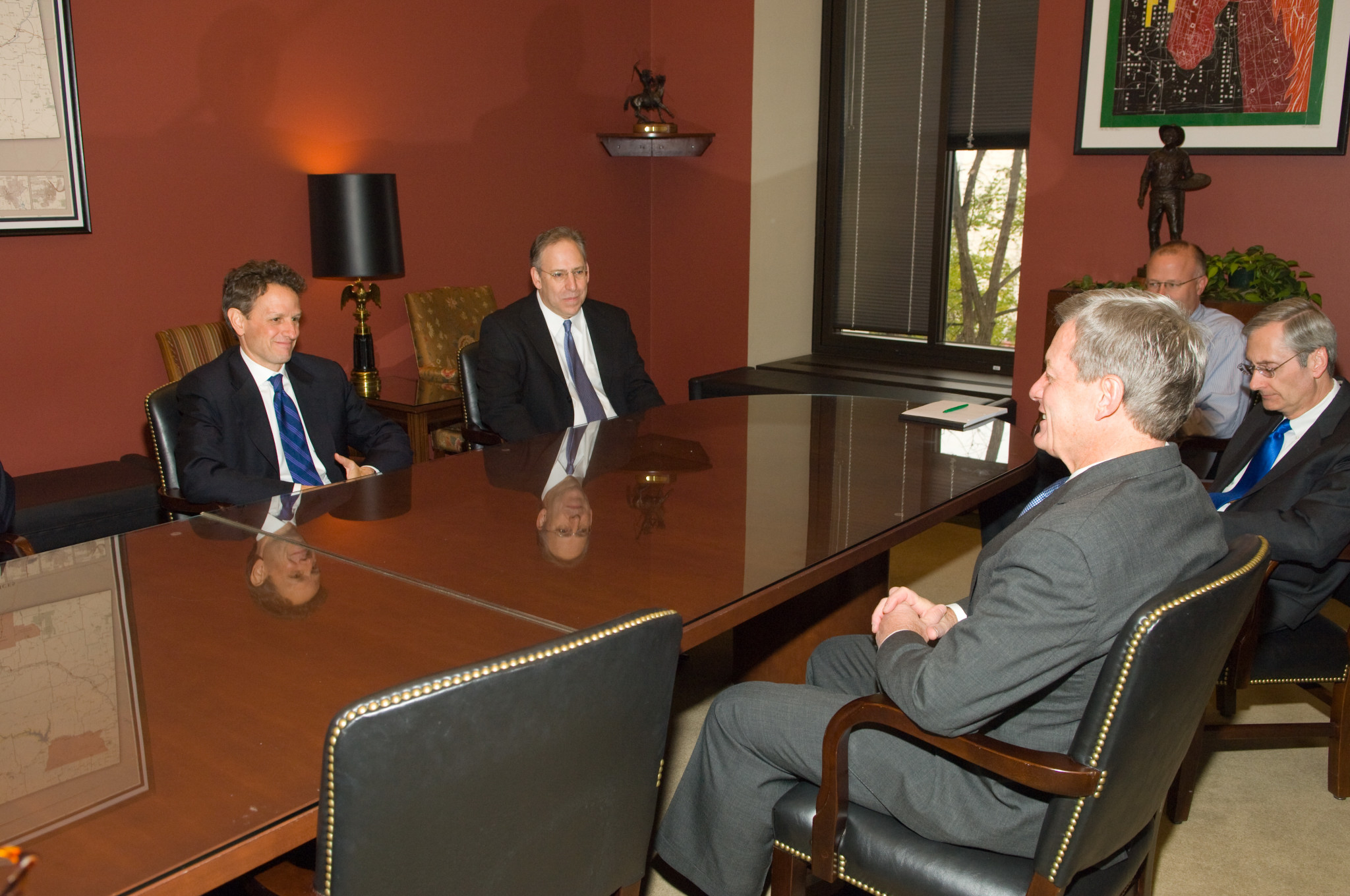
Treasury Secretary designee Geithner meets then-Finance Committee Chairman Max Baucus on November 25, 2008

In 2001, Geithner left the Treasury to join the Council on Foreign Relations as a Senior Fellow in the International Economics department. He was director of the Policy Development and Review Department at the International Monetary Fund from 2001 to 2003.

== Federal Reserve Bank of New York ==
In October 2003, Geithner was named president of the Federal Reserve Bank of New York. As president of the New York Fed, he served as Vice Chairman of the Federal Open Market Committee. In 2006, he became a member of the Washington-based financial advisory body, the Group of Thirty.

In 2005, Geithner expressed concern over Wall Street trading in financial derivatives, which ultimately contributed to the spread of the 2008 financial crisis, though he did not pursue major reforms. In 2004, Geithner called on banks to "build a sufficient cushion against adversity", though in May 2007, he expressed support for the Basel II accord, which critics, including Federal Deposit Insurance Corporation chairperson Sheila Bair, argued would reduce the amount of capital banks would be required to hold to guard against losses. That month, in a speech at the Federal Reserve Bank of Atlanta, Geithner stated, "Financial innovation has improved the capacity to measure and manage risk," but also cautioned that "financial innovation and global financial integration do not offer the prospect of eliminating the risk of asset price and credit cycles, of manias and panics, or of shocks that could have systemic consequences."

As president of the New York Fed, Geithner was a central figure in the U.S. government's response to the 2008 financial crisis.

In mid-March 2008, together with then-Treasury Secretary Henry Paulson, Geithner arranged the rescue and fire sale of Bear Stearns, which was at risk of bankruptcy, to JPMorgan Chase for $2 per share (later raised to $10 per share). The Fed agreed to provide financing for the deal and support up to $30 billion of Bear Stearns's "less-liquid assets", despite some internal protests. In doing so, the New York Fed allowed Bear Stearns itself to calculate the value of assets acquired by the government and exposed itself to losses should those assets have declined in value, though JPMorgan agreed to absorb the first $1 billion in losses. The New York Fed stored these assets in the Maiden Lane limited liability company and awarded no-bid contracts to the Wall Street asset manager BlackRock for management of the assets, with the intent of ridding itself of the assets within 10 years. In testimony before the Senate Banking Committee, countering concerns that the rescue would invite moral hazard problems, Geithner argued that "a sudden, disorderly failure of Bear would have brought with it unpredictable but severe consequences for the functioning of the broader financial system and the broader economy." Under questioning from Senator Chris Dodd, Geithner denied involvement in setting the share price of JPMorgan's purchase of Bear Stearns. Bear Stearns and JPMorgan chief executives Alan Schwartz and Jamie Dimon testified that Geithner and Federal Reserve Chairman Ben Bernanke were aware of the amount being discussed and encouraged negotiators to keep the price low to avoid rewarding investors.

In the late summer of 2008, troubles at the financial services firm Lehman Brothers were accelerating. In late August, the company announced that 1,500 employees (6% of its workforce) would be laid off, following 6,000 layoffs since June 2007. On September 9, Lehman's share price plunged 45% on fears that the company was facing billions of dollars in losses, and on news that a potential investment in the company by Korea Development Bank had fallen through. Three days later, Geithner convened a meeting of Wall Street executives, Secretary Paulson, and Securities and Exchange Commission Chairman Christopher Cox to review exposure to Lehman's fortunes and discuss a possible liquidation of Lehman. Geithner indicated that the government would not save Lehman and urged the executives to cooperate on an industry solution, warning that the crisis could spread to their own firms should a deal not be reached. Government officials believed Lehman's collapse would be less dangerous than that of Bear Stearns, though Geithner sought to avoid that contingency nonetheless, citing the increase in market fragility by the time of Lehman's crisis. Nevertheless, no industry rescue materialized. Bank of America, which had been in talks to purchase Lehman, pulled out after the government indicated it would not take on Lehman's risky real-estate assets, as it had with Bear Stearns. On September 15, Lehman announced that it would file for bankruptcy, making it the largest investment bank failure since Drexel Burnham Lambert in 1990.

Geithner, Paulson, and Bernanke later argued that Lehman's financial situation was too dire for the government to have legally rescued it. A team from Goldman Sachs and Credit Suisse had estimated prior to Lehman's bankruptcy filing that Lehman's liabilities exceeded its assets by tens of billions of dollars (i.e., a negative net worth).

Geithner was instrumental in government dealings with the American International Group (AIG) insurance company. Over the summer of 2008, as credit rating agencies downgraded mortgage-backed securities, AIG faced mounting demands to provide increased collateral to buyers of its credit default swaps. Consequently, by the time of Lehman's failure in September, AIG was facing a rapidly increasing multibillion-dollar capital shortfall. On September 13, AIG chief Robert B. Willumstad informed Geithner that the company would need to raise $40 billion and asked for government assistance in doing so. Geithner rejected the request for government funds and pressed AIG to find a private-sector solution to the company's liquidity crisis. On the morning of September, Geithner reiterated this decision at a meeting of Wall Street executives and requested that Goldman Sachs and JPMorgan organize an industry-based solution. By that evening, private-sector appetite for an AIG rescue has dissipated. Later that night, a consensus emerged at the New York Fed that AIG, with $500 billion in troubled credit-swap obligations, could not be allowed to fail. At a meeting of the Federal Reserve in Washington the next day, Geithner and Paulson proposed lending $85 billion to AIG, with all of AIG's assets held as collateral, in exchange for a 79.9% equity stake in AIG and veto rights over dividend payments. Upon delivering this offer to AIG, Geithner informed Willumstad that there would be "no negotiation".

As a result of Lehman Brothers's failure, money market funds with exposure to Lehman securities found themselves in distress on the day of Lehman's bankruptcy filing. One such fund was the Reserve Primary Fund. Due to the highly stable net asset value (NAV) of money market funds ($1.00 per share), money market funds were extensively relied on by companies for regular cash demands (e.g., payroll). Following Lehman's bankruptcy filing, due to a slowdown in credit markets, the Primary Fund was unable to sell once liquid assets to meet rapidly mounting demands for the redemption of investments. Geithner's New York Fed had been informed of the worsening situation at 7:50 that morning, and the next day rebuffed a request from the Primary Fund to assist it in making payments. Unable to sell Lehman's securities held by the fund, the board of the Primary Fund announced that it would freeze redemptions for seven days and reduce its NAV to $0.97 per share, meaning a money market fund would break the buck for only the second time in the industry's history.

To stabilize the financial market, Geithner proposed that the traditional investment banks Goldman Sachs and Morgan Stanley transform themselves into bank holding companies to ensure continuing access to funding. Both banks completed the restructuring by September 21.

Geithner believed, along with Paulson, that the Treasury needed new authority to respond to the 2008 financial crisis. Paulson described Geithner as a "very unusually talented young man...[who] understands government and understands markets".

== Secretary of the Treasury ==
=== Nomination and confirmation ===
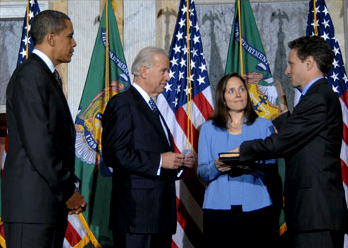
Geithner was sworn in as Treasury Secretary on January 26, 2009

During the 2008 presidential campaign, Geithner was rumored to be a possible choice for Treasury Secretary for both John McCain and Barack Obama. On November 24, 2008, President-elect Barack Obama announced his intention to nominate Geithner to be Treasury Secretary.

During his confirmation, it was disclosed that Geithner had not paid $35,000 in Social Security and Medicare payroll taxes from 2001 through 2004 while working for the International Monetary Fund. The IMF, as an international agency, did not withhold payroll taxes, but instead reimbursed the usual employer responsibility of these taxes to employees. Geithner received the reimbursements and paid the amounts received to the government, but had not paid the remaining half which would normally have been withheld from his pay. The issue, as well as other errors relating to past deductions and expenses, were noted during a 2006 audit by the Internal Revenue Service. Geithner subsequently paid the additional taxes owed. In a statement to the Senate Finance Committee, Geithner called the tax issues "careless", "avoidable", and "unintentional" errors. Geithner testified that he used the software TurboTax to prepare his 2001 and 2002 returns, but that the tax errors were his own responsibility.

On January 26, 2009, the U.S. Senate confirmed Geithner's appointment by a vote of 60–34. Geithner was sworn in as Treasury Secretary by Vice President Joe Biden and witnessed by President Barack Obama.

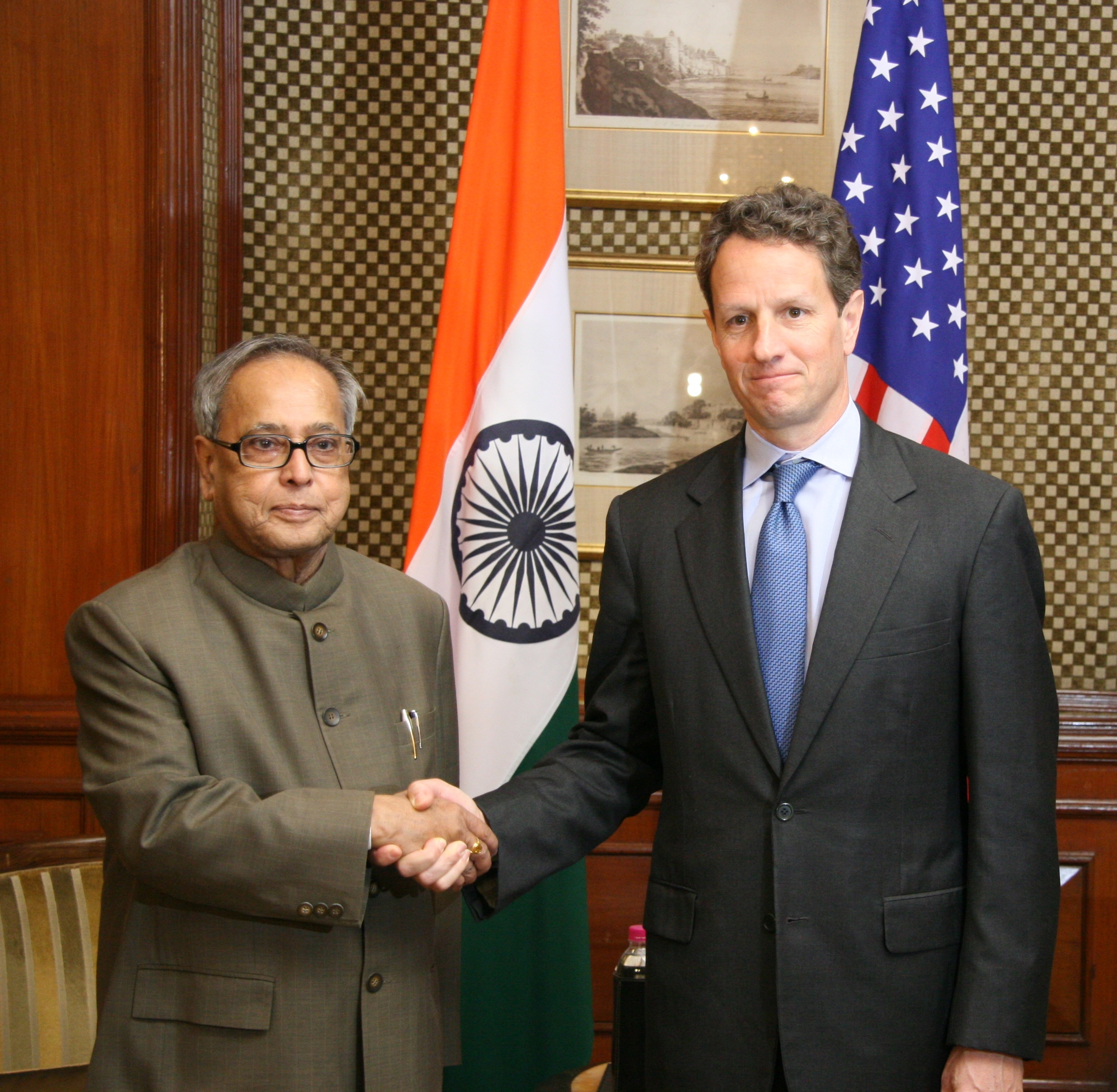
Pranab Mukherjee, then India's finance minister, with Geithner in 2010

=== Bailouts ===
Geithner had authority over the second tranche of $350 billion from the $700 billion banking bailout bill passed by Congress in October 2008. Under the Financial Stability Plan, he proposed to create a new investment fund to provide a market for the legacy loans and securities—the so-called "toxic assets"—burdening the financial system, using a mix of taxpayer and private money. He also proposed expanding a lending program that would spend as much as $1 trillion to cover the decline in the issuance of securities backed by consumer loans. He further proposed to give banks new infusions of capital with which to lend. In exchange, banks would be required to cut the salaries and perks of executives and sharply limit dividends and corporate acquisitions. The plan was criticized by Nobel laureates Paul Krugman and Joseph Stiglitz, a former World Bank Chief Economist.

The Troubled Asset Relief Program (TARP) and takeover of Fannie Mae and Freddie Mac amounted a combined outflow of $620.3 billion in Treasury funds in the form of spending, investments, and loans. As of July 2016, $689 billion has been returned to the Treasury, primarily in the form of refunds provided by bailed-out companies and revenue from dividends.

==== AIG bonuses ====
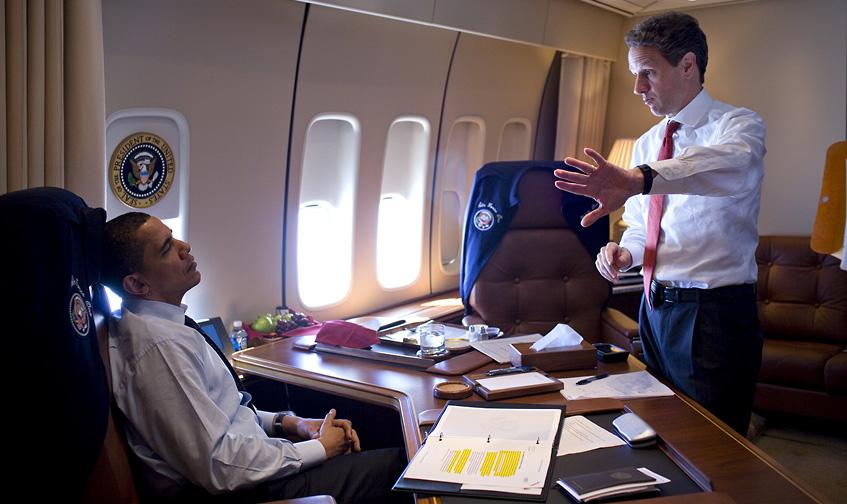
Geithner and Obama aboard Air Force One, 2009

Although President Obama expressed strong support for Geithner, outrage over hundreds of millions of dollars in bonus payments (or employee "retention" payments) by the American International Group, which had received more than $170 billion in federal bailout aid, undermined public support in early 2009. In March 2009, AIG paid $165 million in bonuses to its financial products division, the unit responsible for the company's near collapse the year prior, following $55 million paid to the same division in December 2008 and $121 million in bonus payments to senior executives. In early November 2008, a joint committee of the Federal Reserve, Ernst & Young, and AIG concluded that the bonus payments, which were in contracts predating the government takeover, could not be legally stopped.

During his time at the New York Fed and early in his tenure as Treasury Secretary, Geithner's aides had closely dealt with AIG on compensation issues, though Geithner indicated he was not aware of AIG's plans for bonus payments until March 10, 2009. On March 11, 2009, Geithner called Ed Liddy, the AIG chief, to protest the bonus payouts and request that the contracting containing the bonuses be renegotiated. Later in March, Liddy requested that employees who received bonuses of more than $100,000 return half of the payment. At Geithner's urging, Liddy cut $9.6 million in payments to company's top 50 executives in half and tied the remainder to performance.

==== AIG payments to banks ====
In November 2009, Neil Barofsky, the Treasury Department Inspector General responsible for oversight of TARP funds, issued a report critical of the use of $62.1 billion of government funds to redeem derivative contracts held by several large banks which AIG had insured against losses. The banks received face value for the contracts although their market value at the time was much lower. In the report, Barofsky said the payments "provided [the banks] with tens of billions of dollars they likely would have not otherwise received". Terms for use of the funds had been negotiated with the New York Federal Reserve Bank while Geithner was president.

In January 2010, Rep. Darrell Issa released a series of e-mails between AIG and the New York Fed. In these e-mails, the Fed urged AIG not to disclose the full details of the payments publicly or in its SEC filings. Issa pushed for an investigation of the matter, and for records and e-mails from the Fed to be subpoenaed. Rep. Edolphus Towns, Chairman of the House Oversight and Government Reform Committee, issued subpoenas for the records and scheduled hearings for late January. Federal Reserve Chairman Ben Bernanke said the Fed would welcome a full review of its actions regarding the AIG payments.

Geithner and his predecessor, former Treasury Secretary Henry Paulson, both appeared before the Committee on January 27. Geithner defended the bailout of AIG and the payments to the banks, while reiterating previous denials of any involvement in efforts to withhold details of the transactions. His testimony was met with skepticism and angry disagreement by House members of both parties.

==== Making Home Affordable ====
In his book Bailout: How Washington Abandoned Main Street While Rescuing Wall Street, Neil Barofsky argues that Geithner never had the intention to utilize the Home Affordable Modification Program as intended by Congress. Instead of providing relief for homeowners to avoid foreclosures, it was Geithner's plan that the bank should proceed with these foreclosures. Geithner said that he "estimates" that the banks "can handle ten million foreclosures, over time", and that HAMP "will help foam the runway for them" by “keeping the full flush of foreclosures from hitting the financial system all at the same time". As such, "banks participating in the program have rejected four million borrowers’ requests for help, or 72 percent of their applications, since the process began". Citimortgage and JPMorgan Chase were among the banks that refused the most HAMP claims. As such, the program only helped 887,001 people out of the over 4 Million people that were originally estimated to be able to benefit from the program.

=== China ===
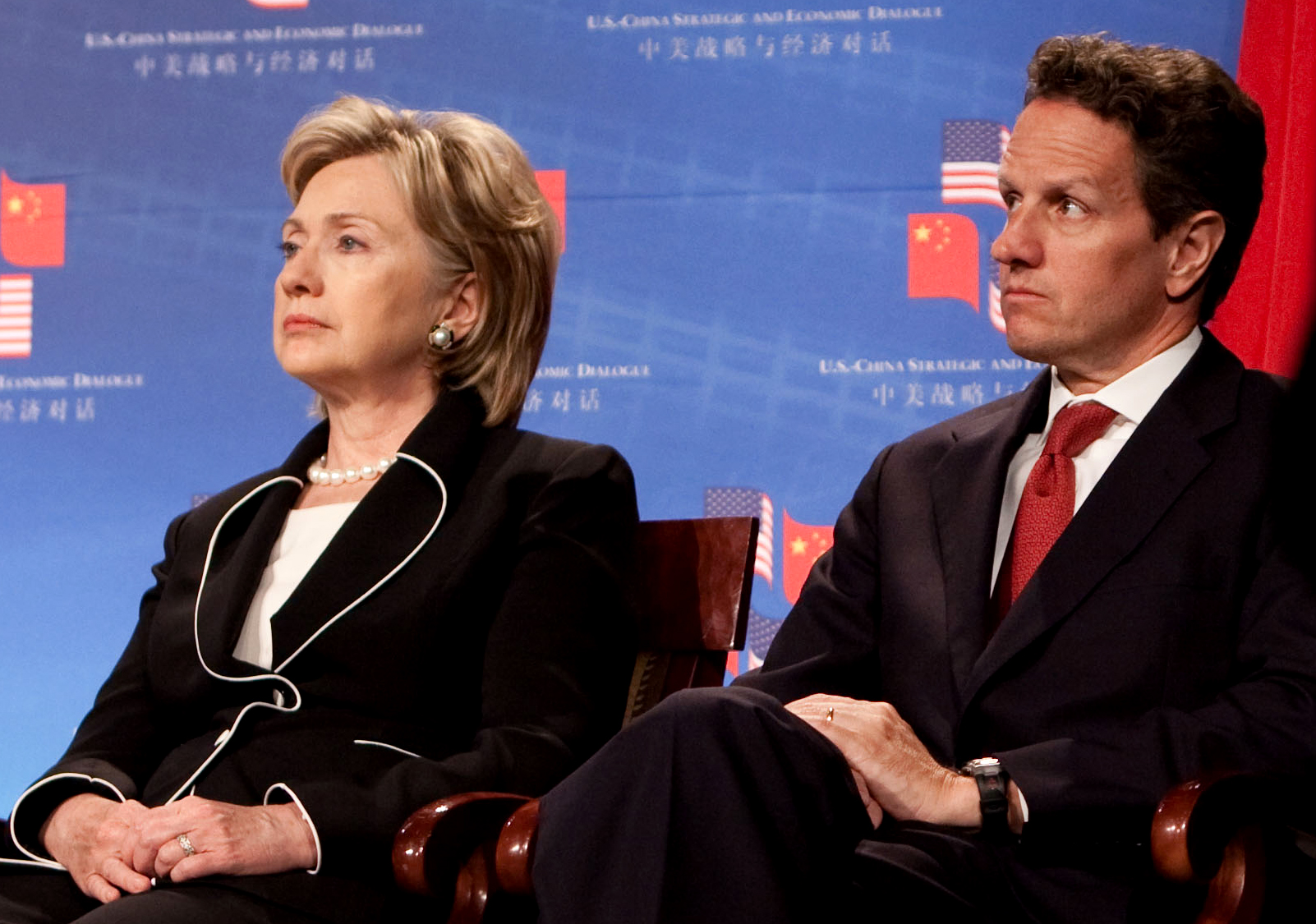
Geithner with Secretary of State Hillary Clinton at the opening session of the first U.S.–China Strategic and Economic Dialogue on July 27, 2009

In written comments to the Senate Finance Committee during his confirmation hearings, Geithner stated that the new administration believed China was "manipulating" its currency and that the Obama administration would act "aggressively" using "all the diplomatic avenues" to change China's currency practices. The Obama administration would pressure China diplomatically to change this practice more strongly than the George W. Bush Administration had done. The United States maintained that China's actions hurt American businesses and contributed to the 2008 financial crisis.

Shortly after assuming his role as Secretary of the Treasury, Geithner met in Washington with Chinese Foreign Minister Yang Jiechi. He told Yang that the U.S. attached great importance to its relations with China and that U.S.–China cooperation was essential in order for the world economy to fully recover.

On June 1, 2009, during a question-and-answer session following a speech at Peking University, Geithner was asked by a student whether Chinese investments in U.S. Treasury debt were safe. His reply that they were "very safe" drew laughter from the audience.

Geithner co-chaired the high-profile U.S.–China Strategic and Economic Dialogue from July 27 to 28 in 2009 in Washington, D.C., and led the Economic Track for the U.S. side.

In September 2011, Geithner told a forum that China had "made possible systematic stealing of intellectual property of American companies and have not been very aggressive to put in place the basic protections for property rights that every serious economy needs over time", a rebuke of longstanding policy on the part of China to demand patents and other intellectual property from companies that sought to produce their products in China. He furthered that China was acting "very, very aggressive in a strategy they started several decades ago", which he defined as the ultimatum of transferring technology or being unable to produce products in China.

=== Opposing extension of tax cuts ===
In summer 2010, The New York Times said Geithner "is President Obama's point man in opposing the extension of the Bush tax cuts for the wealthy after their Dec. 31 expiration. ... [Geithner] has cited the projected $700 billion, 10-year cost of the tax cuts, and nonpartisan analyses that they do not stimulate the economy because the wealthy tend to save the additional money rather than spend it. 'I believe there is no credible argument to be made that the purpose of government is to borrow from future generations of Americans to finance an extension of tax cuts for the top 2 percent,' [he] said in a recent speech."

=== Fiscal cliff and debt limit negotiations ===
Geithner was Obama's lead negotiator about the fiscal cliff and the increase in the 2013 debt limit. For example, on December 5, 2012, Geithner confirmed leaks from the White House, Treasury Secretary Geithner told CNBC that the Obama Administration is "absolutely" willing to go over the fiscal cliff if Republicans refused to back off from their opposition to raising rates on wealthier Americans.

=== Criticism ===
Geithner weathered criticism early in the Obama presidency, when Congressman Connie Mack (R-FL) suggested he should resign over the AIG bonus scandal, and Alabama Senator Richard Shelby said that Geithner was "out of the loop". Democrats largely joined Obama in supporting Geithner, and there was no serious talk of his losing his job from within the administration.

In November 2009, Oregon Representative Peter DeFazio, speaking for himself and some fellow members of the Progressive Caucus, suggested that both Geithner and Lawrence Summers, the director of the National Economic Council, should be fired in order to curtail unemployment and signal a new direction for the Obama administration's fiscal policy. When Geithner appeared in front of the Congressional Joint Economic Committee that month, the ranking House Republican, Kevin Brady of Texas, said to the secretary, "Conservatives agree that, as point person, you've failed. Liberals are growing in that consensus as well. Poll after poll shows the public has lost confidence in this president's ability to handle the economy. For the sake of our jobs, will you step down from your post?" Geithner defended his record, suggesting Brady was misrepresenting the situation and overestimating popular disapproval of his job performance.

In June 2011, The New Republic criticized Geithner from the left, arguing that he was and is overly concerned with the deficit at a time when, following the Great Recession, the government should be pursuing stimulus; and as a result, it is possible that the stimulus was smaller than it could have been.

== Post-Treasury career ==
Geithner left the Obama administration on January 25, 2013, and joined the Council on Foreign Relations as a Distinguished Fellow. He lectures at the Yale School of Management, and is co-chair of the board of directors of the International Rescue Committee.

In March 2014, he became the president and managing director of Warburg Pincus, a private equity firm. In February 2016, it was announced that JPMorgan Chase would provide a line of credit to help Warburg Pincus executives invest in a new multibillion-dollar fund at the firm. In July 2023, he became chairman of Warburg Pincus.

His memoir of his time as Secretary of the Treasury, Stress Test: Reflections on Financial Crises, was published in May 2014. Later that year, on October 7, 2014, Geithner testified in Starr v. United States, a lawsuit alleging that the government cheated American International Group shareholders of $40 billion by demanding a 79.9% stake in the company.

In April 2016, he was one of eight former Treasury secretaries who called on the United Kingdom to remain a member of the European Union ahead of the June 2016 membership referendum.

In July 2018, The Washington Post revealed that Mariner Finance, a company owned by the private equity firm of which Geithner is President, engaged in predatory lending behavior; capturing the sentiments of many former employees of Mariner Finance interviewed by The Post, a former manager trainee at a Mariner Finance branch in Nashville characterized the company's business model as "a way of monetizing poor people".

In the Handbook of Financial Stress Testing published in 2022, Geithner reflected back on financial stress testing and suggested ways forward.

== Personal life ==
Geithner married Carole Marie Sonnenfeld, his classmate at Dartmouth, on June 8, 1985, at his parents' summer home in Orleans, Massachusetts. She is a licensed clinical social worker and an assistant clinical professor of psychiatry and behavioral sciences at George Washington University School of Medicine, where she teaches listening skills to medical students. She is the author of a coming-of-age children's novel about grief. Her father, Albert Sonnenfeld, was a professor of French and Comparative Literature at Princeton University and a food critic; her mother, Portia, died when Carole was 25, shortly after she was married.

== Media ==
Geithner was portrayed by Billy Crudup in the HBO film Too Big to Fail, and by Alex Jennings in the BBC TV movie The Last Days of Lehman Brothers.

== Memberships ==
- Center for Global Development (Board of Directors)
- Council on Foreign Relations
- Economic Club of New York (trustee)
- Bank for International Settlements
- Bilderberg Group

== Published works ==
- Geithner, Timothy F. (2015) [2014]. Stress Test: Reflections on Financial Crises. Crown Publishing Group, Random House. ISBN 978-0804138611.
- Bernanke, Ben S.; Geithner, Timothy F.; Paulson, Henry M. (2019). Firefighting: The Financial Crisis and Its Lessons. Penguin Books. ISBN 978-0143134480.
- Bernanke, Ben S.; Geithner, Timothy F.; Paulson, Henry M. (2020). First Responders: Inside the U.S. Strategy for Fighting the 2007-2009 Global Financial Crisis. Yale University Press. ISBN 978-0300244441.

Other offices
Preceded by William Joseph McDonough	President of the Federal Reserve Bank of New York; 2003–2009	Succeeded by William C. Dudley
Political offices
Preceded by Henry Paulson	United States Secretary of the Treasury; 2009–2013	Succeeded by Jack Lew
U.S. order of precedence (ceremonial)
Preceded by Ray LaHood as Former U.S. Cabinet Member	Order of precedence of the United States as Former U.S. Cabinet Member	Succeeded by Shaun Donovan as Former U.S. Cabinet Member
