= Imminence =

Imminence or Imminent may refer to:

- Imminent lawless action, a standard currently used that was established by the United States Supreme Court in the case Brandenburg v. Ohio
- Imminent threat, justification for the use of force in international law
- Imminence (band), a Swedish metalcore band
- Imminent, a Belgian electronic noise music project including Szkieve

== See also ==
- Emergency management
- Eminence (disambiguation)
- Immanence, the divine encompasses or is manifested in the material world.
- Predatory imminence continuum
- Warning system
