= Well known =

Well known or Well-known is a phrase used in several technical contexts:

- Well-known ports, port number in the range from 0 to 1023
- Well-known text representation of coordinate reference systems, text markup language for representing coordinate reference systems
- Well-known text representation of geometry, text markup language for representing vector geometry objects
- Well-known trade mark, a status granted to famous international trade marks
- Well-known URIs, web services that use /.well-known/ URIs

== See also ==
- Eminent
- Prominence (disambiguation)
