= Curvature tensor =

In differential geometry, the term curvature tensor may refer to:

- the Riemann curvature tensor of a Riemannian manifold — see also Curvature of Riemannian manifolds;
- the Ricci curvature tensor, a contraction of the Riemann curvature tensor;
- the curvature of an affine connection or covariant derivative (on tensors);
- the curvature form of an Ehresmann connection: see Ehresmann connection, connection (principal bundle) or connection (vector bundle). It is one of the numbers that are important in the Einstein field equations.

== See also ==
- Tensor (disambiguation)
