= Emphasis =

Emphasis or emphatic may refer to:

== Communication ==
- Emphasis (telecommunications), intentional alteration of the amplitude-vs.-frequency characteristics of the signal meant to reduce adverse effects of noise
- Cultural emphasis, alleged tendency of a language's vocabulary to detail elements of the speakers' culture

=== Writing ===
- Emphasis (typography), visual enhancement a part of a text to make it noticeable
- Emphasis point, a typographic marking used in some east Asian languages to indicate emphasis

=== Linguistics ===
- Emphatic consonant, member of a phonological category of consonants in Semitic languages
- Prosodic stress, speaking an important word more loudly or slowly so that it stands out
- Do-support, a way of using additional words to call attention to important words
- Intensifier, a way of using additional words to call attention to important words

== Music ==
- Emphasis! (On Parenthesis), 2008 album by the Stanton Moore Trio
- "Emphasis/Who Wants to Live Forever", 2002 single by After Forever
- Emphatic (band), American rock band

== Other uses ==
- Emphatic Diaglott, 1864 Bible translation by Benjamin Wilson
- ST Emphatic

== See also ==
- Prominence (disambiguation)
- Stress (disambiguation)
- Markedness, quality of a non-basic or less natural linguistic form
