= Tense (artwork) =

Installation view of Tense on display in 1990.

Tense is the title of an art installation made by Turner Prize nominee Anya Gallaccio in 1990. The work consists of printed rolls of wallpaper featuring an orange motif, "the paper was pasted on the walls, and on the floor Gallaccio made an oblong 'carpet' comprising one ton of Valencia oranges which gradually decayed over the duration of the show."

In his 2001 essay, Oranges and Lemons and Oranges and Bananas, British art critic, historian and academic Michael Archer said,: "As a somewhat opportune indication that we are dealing here with continuities as much as breaks and new beginnings, it could be pointed out that Anya Gallaccio’s contribution to Bond’s East Country Yard Show was a ton of oranges spread in a large rectangular shape on the floor. It was mixed with an orange-motif wallpaper plastering one of the walls, the work made reference to the building’s past as a fruit warehouse and its planned future as a luxury residence."

The work was on display at the 1990 exhibition East Country Yard Show.
