= HMS Eminent =

Favourite-class tugboat of the Royal Navy

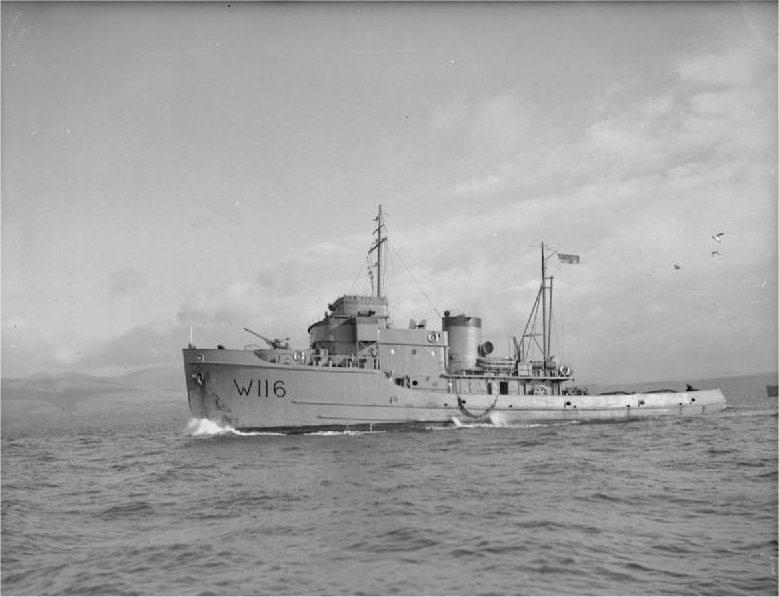

History

United Kingdom
- Name: HMS Eminent (W116)
- Builder: Defoe Shipbuilding Company, Bay City, Michigan
- Laid down: 22 May 1942
- Launched: 12 August 1942
- Commissioned: 14 September 1942
- Stricken: 8 May 1946
- Identification: IMO number: 5235870
- Fate: Returned to the United States Navy, 13 June 1946

General characteristics
- Type: Favourite-class tugboat
- Displacement: 835 tons full
- Length: 143 ft
- Beam: 33 ft 10 in (extreme)
- Draft: 13 ft 2 in (limiting)
- Propulsion: one General Motors Diesel-electric model 12-278A single Fairbanks Morse Main Reduction Gear Ship's Service Generators one Diesel-drive 60 kW 120 V D.C. one Diesel-drive 30 kW 120 V D.C. single propeller, 1,500shp
- Speed: 13 knots
- Complement: 45
- Armament: 1 x 3"/50 caliber gun 2 x single 20mm gun mounts

HMS Eminent (W 116) was a Favourite-class tugboat of the Royal Navy during World War II.

== Service history ==
Eminent was laid down on 22 May 1942 by the Defoe Shipbuilding Company in Bay City, Michigan, as BAT-10, launched 12 August 1942 and commissioned into the Royal Navy under Lend-Lease on 14 September 1942. She served throughout the war with the Royal Navy and was returned to the United States Navy on 13 June 1946 in Subic Bay and struck on 8 May. She was sold to Chinese owners on 24 September 1946, renamed Ming 105 and then renamed Ming 305. She was deleted in 1992 and scrapped in 2005.
