= Prominence (disambiguation) =

Prominence in topography is a measure of the independence of a summit.

Prominence or Prominent may also refer to:

- Celebrity, fame and public attention accorded by the mass media to individuals or groups
- Prominence (phonetics), stress given to a certain syllable in a word, or to a word in a sentence
- Prominence (video game), a science fiction point and click adventure game
- Maxillary prominence, part of the face
- Solar prominence, a large plasma and magnetic field structure in the Sun's atmosphere
- "Prominent" (song), a song by Bonez MC and RAF Camora
- Prominents, moths in the family Notodontidae

== See also ==
- Emphasis (disambiguation)
- Eminent
- Well known
