= Future Tense (Irish radio show) =

- Running time: 30 minutes
- Country of origin: Ireland
- Language: English
- Home station: RTÉ Radio 1
- Hosted by: Ella McSweeney; Brian Finn
- Produced by: Peter Mooney
- Original release: 2001 – 2004
- No. of series: 4
- Website: Future Tense homepage

Future Tense is a weekly 30-minute Irish radio programme which aired on RTÉ Radio 1. Presented by Ella McSweeney, the show focused on issues in science and technology.
