= Present Tense (Arrow) =

- Arrow episode
- Episode no.: Season 8 Episode 4
- Directed by: Kristin Windell
- Written by: Oscar Balderrama; Jeane Wong
- Cinematography by: Neil Cervin
- Editing by: David Holland
- Original air date: November 5, 2019

Guest appearances
- Echo Kellum as Curtis Holt (special guest star); Jamie Andrew Cutler as Grant Wilson / Deathstroke; Venus Terzo as Elisa Schwartz

Episode chronology
← Previous "Leap of Faith"	Next → "Prochnost"
- Arrow season 8

"Present Tense" is the fourth episode of the eighth season of the American television series Arrow, based on the DC Comics character Green Arrow, revolving around billionaire playboy Oliver Queen as he returns to Starling City (later renamed Star City), after having been shipwrecked for five years, and becomes a bow-wielding, hooded vigilante who sets out to fight crime and corruption. It is set in the Arrowverse, sharing continuity with the other television series of the universe. The episode was written by Oscar Balderrama and Jeane Wong and was directed by Kristin Windell.

Stephen Amell stars as Oliver, and is joined by principal cast members David Ramsey, Rick Gonzalez, Juliana Harkavy, Katherine McNamara, Ben Lewis, Joseph David-Jones, LaMonica Garrett and Katie Cassidy. The episode follows the future and present Team Arrow working together to stop Grant Wilson from taking over Star City.

"Present Tense" first aired in the United States on The CW on November 6, 2019, and was watched live by 0.62 million viewers, with a 0.2/1 share among adults aged 18 to 49. The episode received generally positive reviews from critics.

== Plot ==
Present team Arrow are shocked that future team Arrow has travelled back in time. William Clayton tells his father Oliver Queen that the year is meant to be 2040. William's half-sister Mia Smoak and Connor Hawke decide not to tell present team Arrow about the dystopian future of Star City under the interests of preserving their timeline, but William doubts that they can keep this a secret for long. Oliver wants to connect with his children's future selves; he is able to restore his bond with William, but Mia keeps her distance out of resentment. The next day at the bunker, the two teams watch a newscast of the Deathstroke gang. The future team believes the gang leader is John Diggle Jr. and go to confront him, only to realize it is Grant Wilson. Grant plants bombs but Oliver and the rest of the present team manage to save the future team.

Connor and William reveal everything to the present team, resulting in Rene Ramirez and John Diggle, and later Diggle and Connor arguing. Laurel Lance and Mia go to the hospital and Laurel realizes that Mia is going to try and kill Grant. Grant plans to use coordinated bomb attacks, and has them all connected to a phone. Both teams suit up and try to find Grant. Once they do, Mia is going to kill him but Oliver stops her from doing so. The next morning, Oliver takes Mia to his father Robert's grave and tells her that he did not know his true father until he had died; he does not want to be like that between them. Oliver then gets a call from Curtis Holt who says that there is a weapon that can defeat Mar Novu but the man who can make it is in Russia. Laurel exits the SCPD and Novu appears before her. He offers to bring back Earth-2, but it will require a simple task: she must betray Oliver.

== Production ==
=== Development ===
On August 21, 2019, it was announced that the fourth episode of the eighth season of Arrow would be titled "Present Tense". The episode was written by Oscar Balderrama and Jeane Wong and was directed by Kristin Windell.

=== Writing ===
The episode features the first meeting between Oliver Queen, and the adult version of his son William Clayton, played by Ben Lewis. Having read the script for the previous episode, which concludes with the adult William, alongside his sister Mia Smoak and friend Connor Hawke arriving in the present day from the future, Lewis contacted showrunner Beth Schwartz to request that the reunion between William and his father include a scene where William tells his father he is gay. Stephen Amell referred to the scene as his favorite of the season.

=== Casting ===
Main cast members Stephen Amell, David Ramsey, Rick Gonzalez, Juliana Harkavy, Katherine McNamara, Ben Lewis, Joseph David-Jones, LaMonica Garrett and Katie Cassidy appear as Oliver Queen / Green Arrow, John Diggle, Rene Ramirez and Dinah Drake, Mia Smoak, William Clayton, Connor Hawke, Mar Novu / Monitor and Laurel Lance / Black Canary. Despite the "special appearance" bill, Cassidy is still considered part of the main cast. The guest cast includes Echo Kellum as Curtis Holt, Venus Terzo as Elisa Schwartz, and Jamie Andrew Cutler as Grant Wilson / Deathstroke. Cutler reprised his role from the Legends of Tomorrow season 1 episode "Star City 2046".

=== Filming ===
Preparation ran from August 6 until August 14, 2019. Shooting ran from August 15 until August 27, 2019.

== Reception ==
=== Ratings ===
"Present Tense" was first aired in the United States on The CW on November 5, 2019. It was watched live by 0.62 million viewers with a 0.2/1 share among adults aged 18 to 49, also the lowest-viewed episode of the series.

=== Critical response ===
The review aggregator website Rotten Tomatoes reported a 100% approval rating for the episode, based on 11 reviews, with an average rating of 8.45/10. The website's critical consensus reads, "The future is brought into the "Present Tense" in an emotional Arrow installment that provides Stephen Amell with some of his most resonant material yet."

Allison Shoemaker of The A.V. Club rated the episode A−, saying, "It's a fine Arrow plot, kind of vague but mostly effective. It doesn't matter, anyway—it's just a means to an end. The real meat of the story exists in the conversations between these people, and the presence of the Deathstroke gang makes those conversations about a thousand percent more interesting." Delia Harrington of Den of Geek described it as "fun-ass television" and "a tremendous step forwards". She complimented all the callbacks to season 2 and Stephen Amell's acting stating that he is "(he) has done some of his best work so far this season, and this episode tops it all. "

Jesse Schedeen of IGN rated the episode 7.1 out of 10, noting that the Deathstroke of 2019 suffers as the actor is not very enthusiastic about the role. Schedeen praised Amell's performance and the strong material he is given to work with.
