= Stress (journal) =

- Discipline: Stress, neurology
- Language: English
- Edited by: James Herman

Publication details
- History: 1996-present
- Publisher: Taylor & Francis
- Frequency: Bimonthly
- Impact factor: 3.493 (2020)

Standard abbreviations
- ISO 4: Stress

Indexing
- CODEN: STREFR
- ISSN: 1025-3890 (print); 1607-8888 (web)
- OCLC no.: 36276980

Links
- Journal homepage; Online access; Online access

Stress is a bimonthly peer-reviewed medical journal covering research on stress in terms of: the mechanisms of stressful stimulation, the physiological and behavioural responses to stress, and their regulation, in both the short and long term; adaptive mechanisms, and the pathological consequences of stress. This includes research in physiology, neuroscience, molecular biology, genetics, immunology, and behaviour.

The journal is published by Taylor & Francis and the editor-in-chief is James Herman (University of Cincinnati). It was established in 1996 and according to the Journal Citation Reports it has a 2020 impact factor of 3.493.
