= Stress cracking =

Stress cracking may refer to:

- Environmental stress cracking
- Stress corrosion cracking
- Sulfide stress cracking
