= Tension =

Tension may refer to:

== Science ==
- Psychological stress
- Tension (physics), a force related to the stretching of an object (the opposite of compression)
- Tension (geology), a stress which stretches rocks in two opposite directions
- Voltage or electric tension, the difference in electric potential energy between two points

== Entertainment ==
- Tension (music), the perceived need for relaxation or release created by a listener's expectations
- Suspense, the feeling of uncertainty and interest about the outcome of certain actions an audience perceives
- Tension (film), a 1949 film by John Berry
- Tension (Taiwanese band), a Taiwanese a cappella group and boy band
- Tension (hardcore band), an American hardcore punk band

=== Albums ===
- Tension (Dizmas album), 2007
- Tension (Bakufu Slump album), 1994
- Tension (Kylie Minogue album), 2023
- Ten$ion, a 2012 album by Die Antwoord

=== Songs ===
- "Tension" (song), a song by Kylie Minogue from her studio album of the same name
- "Tension", a song by Avenged Sevenfold from Diamonds in the Rough
- "Tension", a song by Jack & Jack from A Good Friend Is Nice
- "Tension", a song by Killing Joke from What's THIS For...!
- "Tension", a song by Korn from The Path of Totality
- "Tension", a song by Orbital from The Altogether
- "Tension", a song by Scullion from the 1980 album Balance and Control
- "Tension", a song by Susumu Hirasawa from Paranoia Agent Original Soundtrack
- "Tension (Interlude)", a song by Børns from Blue Madonna
- "Tension", a song by Fergie from Double Dutchess

== Other uses ==
- Tension (knitting), a factor that affects knitting gauge
- Tenseness, in phonetics, a phonological quality frequently associated with vowels and occasionally with consonants
- Muscle tone or residual muscle tension, a partial contraction of the muscles
- The Void (video game), also known as Tension in some regions
- Talay Riley, British singer-songwriter nicknamed Tension

== See also ==
- Stress (disambiguation)
