= FBI (disambiguation) =

FBI is the United States Federal Bureau of Investigation, a law enforcement agency.

FBI may also refer to:

== Music ==
- F.B.I. (album), a 1996 song and album by The Dayton Family
- "F.B.I." (instrumental), a 1961 single by The Shadows
- FBi Radio, a community radio station based in Sydney, Australia

== Television ==
- The F.B.I. (TV series), a 1965–1974 television series based in part on actual FBI cases
- FBi (Fully Booked Interactive), a 2000 British children's TV show, a reformat of the series Fully Booked
- FBI (franchise), also known as The FBIs, an ensemble of police procedural television series produced by Wolf Entertainment
  - FBI (TV series), first broadcast in 2018, based on the criminal division of the Federal Bureau of Investigation
  - FBI: Most Wanted, a spin-off first broadcast in 2020
  - FBI: International, a spin-off first broadcast in 2021

== Organizations ==
- Federation of British Industries, merged into Confederation of British Industry in 1965
- Flying Buffalo Inc., a game publisher based in the Arizona, United States
- Furniture Brands International, formerly in Clayton, Missouri, an American home furnishings company
- Full Blooded Italians, a professional wrestling stable

== Science ==
- The Fauna of British India, a series of scientific books published by the British government in India (1890–1947)
- FBI mnemonics, for describing directions in magnetic fields
- FBI transform (Fourier-Bros-Iaglonitzer transform), a concept in mathematics

== Other uses ==
- F.B.I. Frog Butthead Investigators, a 2012 film

== See also ==
- The FBI Story, a 1959 film about the Federal Bureau of Investigation
- FBI MoneyPak Ransomware, a ransomware virus that claims to be from the FBI
