= Stress Test (book) =

Memoir by former Secretary of the Treasury Timothy Geithner

- First edition
- Author: Timothy Geithner
- Language: English
- Genre: Memoir
- Publisher: Crown Publishing Group
- Publication date: 2014
- Publication place: United States

Stress Test: Reflections on Financial Crises is a 2014 memoir by former United States Secretary of the Treasury Timothy Geithner, written as an account of the effort to save the United States economy from collapsing in the wake of the 2008 financial crisis. Journalist Michael Grunwald is credited as Geithner's collaborator for the writing. It was listed for five consecutive weeks on The New York Times Non-Fiction Bestseller list upon its release in May 2014.

Stress Test details how "The financial crisis exposed our system of consumer protection as a dysfunctional mess, leaving ordinary Americans way too vulnerable to fraud and other malfeasance", and notes that "Many borrowers, especially in subprime markets, bit off more than they could chew because they didn’t understand the absurdly complex and opaque terms of their financial arrangements, or were actively channeled into the riskiest deals."

== Awards and honors ==
Bill Gates named the book to his 2014 Summer Reading List.
