= Cultural emphasis =

Aspect of a culture reflected by vocabulary

Cultural emphasis is an important aspect of a culture which is often reflected through language and, more specifically, vocabulary. This means that the vocabulary people use in a culture indicates what is important to that group of people. If there are many words to describe a certain topic in a specific culture, then there is a good chance that that topic is considered important to that culture.

== Background ==
The idea of cultural emphasis is rooted in the work of Franz Boas, who is considered to be one of the founders of American Anthropology. Franz Boas developed and taught concepts such as cultural relativism and the "cultural unconscious", which allowed anthropologists who studied under him, like Edward Sapir and Ruth Benedict, to further study and develop ideas on language and culture.

== Application ==
One way in which cultural emphasis is exemplified is through the populace talking about the weather. For example, in a place where it is cold and it snows a lot, a large collection of words to describe the snow would be expected.

For example: whiteout, blizzard, sleeting, snowdrift, powder snow, packed snow, fresh snow.

In a place where it is hot, a cornucopia of associated terms would be expected.

For example: dry heat, muggy, humid, sticky, monsoon season, sweltering.

A concentration of related terms for similar phenomena suggests the importance in distinguishing between them. Furthermore, if you are not from the area, or that culture, you might not have experienced or know the difference between, for example, a dry heat or a humid heat, when the difference may have huge implications for the outcome of a particular action.

== See also ==
- Eskimo words for snow, popular urban legend that the Inuit or Eskimo have an unusually large number of words for snow
- Linguistic relativity, or "Sapir–Whorf hypothesis", the idea that the varying cultural concepts and categories inherent in different languages affect the cognitive classification of the experienced world in such a way that speakers of different languages think and behave differently because of it
