= Past Tense (disambiguation) =

The past tense is a verb tense expressing action, activity, state or being in the past.

Past Tense may also refer to:

- Past Tense (1994 film), a 1994 made-for-TV mystery starring Scott Glenn and Lara Flynn Boyle
- Past Tense (2006 film), a mystery starring Paula Trickey
- Past Tense (2014 film), a 2014 Philippine romantic comedy-drama film
- "Past Tense" (Magnum, P.I.), a 1982 television episode
- "Past Tense" (Star Trek: Deep Space Nine), 1995 pair of episodes of Star Trek
- "Past Tense" (Venture Bros. episode)
- Short Trips: Past Tense, a 2004 Big Finish original anthology edited by Ian Farrington and based on the British television series Doctor Who
- Past Tense (novel), a novel by Lee Child
- "Past Tense", a song by Intronaut on their album Valley of Smoke
- "Past Tense", a song by Meshuggah on their album Immutable
