= CJK Compatibility Ideographs =

- Range: U+F900..U+FAFF (512 code points)
- Plane: BMP
- Scripts: Han
- Assigned: 472 code points
- Unused: 40 reserved code points
- Source standards: KS X 1001; Big5; IBM 32; JIS X 0213; ARIB STD-B24; KPS 10721-2000

Unicode version history
- 1.0.1 (1992): 302 (+302)
- 3.2 (2002): 361 (+59)
- 4.1 (2005): 467 (+106)
- 5.2 (2009): 470 (+3)
- 6.1 (2012): 472 (+2)

Unicode documentation
- Code chart ∣ Web page
- Note: Range was initially part of the Private Use Area in Unicode 1.0.0, and removed from it in Unicode 1.0.1.

CJK Compatibility Ideographs is a Unicode block created to contain mostly Han characters that were encoded in multiple locations in other established character encodings, in addition to their CJK Unified Ideographs assignments, in order to retain round-trip compatibility between Unicode and those encodings. However, it also contains 12 unified ideographs sourced from Japanese character sets from IBM.

The block has dozens of ideographic variation sequences registered in the Unicode Ideographic Variation Database (IVD). These sequences specify the desired glyph variant for a given Unicode character.

== Character sources ==
Sources for the original collection of CJK Compatibility Ideographs include:

- South Korean KS X 1001 (U+F900–U+FA0B, 268 characters; see that page for the explanation)
- Taiwanese Big5 (U+FA0C–U+FA0D, 2 characters)
- "IBM 32": 32 Japanese characters from IBM (U+FA0E–U+FA2D; see below)

In ensuing versions of the standard, more characters have been added to the block from:

- South Korean KS X 1001 (U+FA2E–U+FA2F, 2 characters)
- Japanese JIS X 0213 (U+FA30–U+FA6A, 59 characters)
- Japanese ARIB STD-B24 (U+FA6B–U+FA6D, 3 characters)
- North Korean KPS 10721-2000 (U+FA70–U+FAD9, 106 characters)

=== The "IBM 32" characters ===
IBM Japanese double-byte EBCDIC includes several kanji which do not exist in, or do not round-trip from, JIS X 0208. These were included as gaiji in extensions to Shift JIS and EUC-JP from IBM (e.g. code page 942), NEC, the Open Software Foundation, and Microsoft (e.g. Windows code page 932). However, they were not used as a source for the original Unified Repertoire and Ordering (URO). Instead, 32 of the IBM extension kanji, those which had not been included in the URO from other sources, were included in the CJK Compatibility Ideographs block in the range U+FA0E–U+FA2D.

Of these 32 characters:

- 19 are unifiable with characters in the URO, and are therefore compatibility ideographs in the strict sense.
- 12 are kokuji characters which are actually unified ideographs (with the Unified_Ideograph property, and which do not change upon normalisation). In spite of their inclusion in the CJK Compatibility Ideographs block and their algorithmically generated character names beginning with "CJK COMPATIBILITY IDEOGRAPH", they are not duplicates of characters in the original CJK Unified Ideographs block in any respect; 11 of these 12 are completely non-duplicate, while U+FA23 﨣 CJK COMPATIBILITY IDEOGRAPH-FA23 was later unintentionally duplicated in CJK Unified Ideographs Extension B as U+27EAF 𧺯 CJK UNIFIED IDEOGRAPH-27EAF. They are placed there because they do not have a URO encoding, yet IBM 32 is one of the encodings where duplicate encodings are of concern. All of them are rarely used or are variants of common kanji. They are as follows:
- U+FA0E 﨎 CJK COMPATIBILITY IDEOGRAPH-FA0E
- U+FA0F 﨏 CJK COMPATIBILITY IDEOGRAPH-FA0F
- U+FA11 﨑 CJK COMPATIBILITY IDEOGRAPH-FA11
- U+FA13 﨓 CJK COMPATIBILITY IDEOGRAPH-FA13
- U+FA14 﨔 CJK COMPATIBILITY IDEOGRAPH-FA14
- U+FA1F 﨟 CJK COMPATIBILITY IDEOGRAPH-FA1F
- U+FA21 﨡 CJK COMPATIBILITY IDEOGRAPH-FA21
- U+FA23 﨣 CJK COMPATIBILITY IDEOGRAPH-FA23
- U+FA24 﨤 CJK COMPATIBILITY IDEOGRAPH-FA24
- U+FA27 﨧 CJK COMPATIBILITY IDEOGRAPH-FA27
- U+FA28 﨨 CJK COMPATIBILITY IDEOGRAPH-FA28
- U+FA29 﨩 CJK COMPATIBILITY IDEOGRAPH-FA29
- Uniquely, (U+FA20 蘒 CJK COMPATIBILITY IDEOGRAPH-FA20) is intended to be encoded as the kyūjitai form of a kokuji which received a separate encoding for a variant that is straightforwardly the (extended) shinjitai form U+8612 蘒 CJK UNIFIED IDEOGRAPH-8612. The URO only encoded the shinjitai form, and uses its stroke count to place it in this position. It is furthermore one variant of the many variants of the jinmeiyō kanji U+8429 萩 CJK UNIFIED IDEOGRAPH-8429 (i.e. Kummerowia). U+FA20 was assigned a normalisation to U+8612, even though the 龜 and 亀 components, while both forms of radical 213, are not usually considered unifiable.

== Block ==
CJK Compatibility Ideographs^{[1]}^{[2]}^{[3]} Official Unicode Consortium code chart (PDF)
	0	1	2	3	4	5	6	7	8	9	A	B	C	D	E	F
U+F90x	豈	更	車	賈	滑	串	句	龜	龜	契	金	喇	奈	懶	癩	羅
U+F91x	蘿	螺	裸	邏	樂	洛	烙	珞	落	酪	駱	亂	卵	欄	爛	蘭
U+F92x	鸞	嵐	濫	藍	襤	拉	臘	蠟	廊	朗	浪	狼	郎	來	冷	勞
U+F93x	擄	櫓	爐	盧	老	蘆	虜	路	露	魯	鷺	碌	祿	綠	菉	錄
U+F94x	鹿	論	壟	弄	籠	聾	牢	磊	賂	雷	壘	屢	樓	淚	漏	累
U+F95x	縷	陋	勒	肋	凜	凌	稜	綾	菱	陵	讀	拏	樂	諾	丹	寧
U+F96x	怒	率	異	北	磻	便	復	不	泌	數	索	參	塞	省	葉	說
U+F97x	殺	辰	沈	拾	若	掠	略	亮	兩	凉	梁	糧	良	諒	量	勵
U+F98x	呂	女	廬	旅	濾	礪	閭	驪	麗	黎	力	曆	歷	轢	年	憐
U+F99x	戀	撚	漣	煉	璉	秊	練	聯	輦	蓮	連	鍊	列	劣	咽	烈
U+F9Ax	裂	說	廉	念	捻	殮	簾	獵	令	囹	寧	嶺	怜	玲	瑩	羚
U+F9Bx	聆	鈴	零	靈	領	例	禮	醴	隸	惡	了	僚	寮	尿	料	樂
U+F9Cx	燎	療	蓼	遼	龍	暈	阮	劉	杻	柳	流	溜	琉	留	硫	紐
U+F9Dx	類	六	戮	陸	倫	崙	淪	輪	律	慄	栗	率	隆	利	吏	履
U+F9Ex	易	李	梨	泥	理	痢	罹	裏	裡	里	離	匿	溺	吝	燐	璘
U+F9Fx	藺	隣	鱗	麟	林	淋	臨	立	笠	粒	狀	炙	識	什	茶	刺
U+FA0x	切	度	拓	糖	宅	洞	暴	輻	行	降	見	廓	兀	嗀	﨎	﨏
U+FA1x	塚	﨑	晴	﨓	﨔	凞	猪	益	礼	神	祥	福	靖	精	羽	﨟
U+FA2x	蘒	﨡	諸	﨣	﨤	逸	都	﨧	﨨	﨩	飯	飼	館	鶴	郞	隷
U+FA3x	侮	僧	免	勉	勤	卑	喝	嘆	器	塀	墨	層	屮	悔	慨	憎
U+FA4x	懲	敏	既	暑	梅	海	渚	漢	煮	爫	琢	碑	社	祉	祈	祐
U+FA5x	祖	祝	禍	禎	穀	突	節	練	縉	繁	署	者	臭	艹	艹	著
U+FA6x	褐	視	謁	謹	賓	贈	辶	逸	難	響	頻	恵	𤋮	舘		
U+FA7x	並	况	全	侀	充	冀	勇	勺	喝	啕	喙	嗢	塚	墳	奄	奔
U+FA8x	婢	嬨	廒	廙	彩	徭	惘	慎	愈	憎	慠	懲	戴	揄	搜	摒
U+FA9x	敖	晴	朗	望	杖	歹	殺	流	滛	滋	漢	瀞	煮	瞧	爵	犯
U+FAAx	猪	瑱	甆	画	瘝	瘟	益	盛	直	睊	着	磌	窱	節	类	絛
U+FABx	練	缾	者	荒	華	蝹	襁	覆	視	調	諸	請	謁	諾	諭	謹
U+FACx	變	贈	輸	遲	醙	鉶	陼	難	靖	韛	響	頋	頻	鬒	龜	𢡊
U+FADx	𢡄	𣏕	㮝	䀘	䀹	𥉉	𥳐	𧻓	齃	龎						
U+FAEx																
U+FAFx																
Notes: 1. As of Unicode version 17.0; 2. Grey areas indicate non-assigned code points; 3. Yellow areas indicate the 12 unified CJK characters encoded in this block.

== History ==
The following Unicode-related documents record the purpose and process of defining specific characters in the CJK Compatibility Ideographs block:

Version	Final code points (Note: Proposed code points and characters names may differ from final code points and names)	Count	L2 ID	WG2 ID	IRG ID	Document
1.0.1	U+F900..FA2D	302		N782		Ksar, Mike (1991-10-12), Attachment to N 767 WG2-Paris meeting copies of working papers
1.0.1	U+F900..FA2D	302	L2/03-399			Fok, Anthony (2003-10-13), Unihan reported errors / changes re kHKSCS entries
1.0.1	U+F900..FA2D	302	L2/03-367	N2667		Suignard, Michel; Muller, Eric; Jenkins, John (2003-10-22), CJK Ideograph source references corrections
1.0.1	U+F900..FA2D	302	L2/03-398			Nguyen, D. (2003-10-29), Unihan reported errors / changes re kCowles
1.0.1	U+F900..FA2D	302	L2/03-417			Muller, Eric (2003-10-31), Variation sequences for CJK Compatibility characters
1.0.1	U+F900..FA2D	302	L2/06-309R			Karlsson, Kent (2006-11-07), Bug in DerivedNumericValues.txt
1.0.1	U+F900..FA2D	302	L2/06-324R2			Moore, Lisa (2006-11-29), "Consensus 109-C18", UTC #109 Minutes, "Add numeric values to 8 compatibility ideographs to match their canonical characters."
1.0.1	U+F900..FA2D	302	L2/08-238			Cook, Richard; Lunde, Ken (2008-06-09), Recommendation For IRG To Use IVD Collections
1.0.1	U+F900..FA2D	302	L2/08-373	N3525		Lunde, Ken; Muller, Eric (2008-10-06), Handling CJK compatibility characters with variation sequences
1.0.1	U+F900..FA2D	302	L2/08-425			Cook, Richard; Lunde, Ken (2008-11-18), IRG Use of IVD Collections
1.0.1	U+F900..FA2D	302	L2/09-003R			Moore, Lisa (2009-02-12), "WG2 — Compatibility Ideographs", UTC #118 / L2 #215 Minutes
1.0.1	U+F900..FA2D	302	L2/09-080	N3590		Muller, Eric (2009-03-11), Difficulties with compatibility ideographs
1.0.1	U+F900..FA2D	302	L2/09-290			Muller, Eric (2009-08-07), Draft IVD registration for Compatibility Characters
1.0.1	U+F900..FA2D	302	L2/11-243	N4111		Sources for Orphaned CJK Ideographs, 2011-06-14
1.0.1	U+F900..FA2D	302	L2/11-254			Constable, Peter (2011-06-20), "Update to UTR #45 U-Source Ideographs requested", UTC Liaison Report from WG2
1.0.1	U+F900..FA2D	302		N4103		"Resolution 58.05", Unconfirmed minutes of WG 2 meeting 58, 2012-01-03
1.0.1	U+F900..FA2D	302	L2/17-090			Chung, Jaemin (2017-04-07), Proposal to add informative notes and cross-reference to U+F92C and U+F9B8
1.0.1	U+F900..FA2D	302	L2/17-103			Moore, Lisa (2017-05-18), "B.4.1 Proposal to add informative notes and cross-reference to U+F92C and U+F9B8", UTC #151 Minutes
3.2	U+FA30..FA6A	59	L2/99-016	N1935		Paterson, Bruce (1998-11-30), Editorial corrigenda on CJK compatibility ideographs, and other items
3.2	U+FA30..FA6A	59	L2/99-240			Addition of fifty six KANJIs for compatibility, 1999-07-15
3.2	U+FA30..FA6A	59	L2/99-232	N2003		Umamaheswaran, V. S. (1999-08-03), "7.2.2.1 Editorial corrigenda on CJK compatibility", Minutes of WG 2 meeting 36, Fukuoka, Japan, 1999-03-09--15
3.2	U+FA30..FA6A	59	L2/99-311			Addition of fifty six KANJIs for compatibility, 1999-08-23
3.2	U+FA30..FA6A	59	L2/99-313	N2095		Sato, T. K. (1999-09-08), Addition of CJK ideographs which are already "unified"
3.2	U+FA30..FA6A	59	L2/99-316			Whistler, Ken (1999-09-13), Comments on JCS proposal
3.2	U+FA30..FA6A	59	L2/99-322			Collins, Lee (1999-10-11), Comments on JCS compatibility characters in L2/99-310 through L2/99-313
3.2	U+FA30..FA6A	59	L2/99-365			Moore, Lisa (1999-11-23), Comments on JCS Proposals
3.2	U+FA30..FA6A	59	L2/99-383	N2142	N710	The response to WG2 resolution M37.16: CJK compatibility ideographs from JIS (WG2 N2104), 1999-12-09
3.2	U+FA30..FA6A	59	L2/00-010	N2103		Umamaheswaran, V. S. (2000-01-05), "8.8", Minutes of WG 2 meeting 37, Copenhagen, Denmark: 1999-09-13—16
3.2	U+FA30..FA6A	59	L2/99-260R			Moore, Lisa (2000-02-07), "JCS Proposals", Minutes of the UTC/L2 meeting in Mission Viejo, October 26-28, 1999
3.2	U+FA30..FA6A	59	L2/00-101	N2197		Sato, T. K. (2000-03-15), Update: CJK COMPATIBILITY IDEOGRAPH request
3.2	U+FA30..FA6A	59	L2/00-172	N2221		Sato, T. K. (2000-04-20), JIS COMPATIBILITY IDEOGRAPHS (draft for ammendment-1) [sic]
3.2	U+FA30..FA6A	59		N2221R		JIS COMPATIBILITY IDEOGRAPHS (draft for ammendment-1) [sic] revised, 2000-06-01
3.2	U+FA30..FA6A	59	L2/00-190			Moore, Lisa (2000-06-22), UTC Rescinds Acceptance of Four Duplicate Radicals from JIS X 213
3.2	U+FA30..FA6A	59	L2/00-234	N2203 (rtf, txt)		Umamaheswaran, V. S. (2000-07-21), "7.3", Minutes from the SC2/WG2 meeting in Beijing, 2000-03-21 -- 24
3.2	U+FA30..FA6A	59	L2/00-337	N2273		JIS compatibility ideographs, 2000-09-19
3.2	U+FA30..FA6A	59	L2/00-378	N2295		Sato, T. K. (2000-10-26), Feedback from Japan on N2281 -- working draft on pDAM 1 -- CJK Compatibility
3.2	U+FA30..FA6A	59	L2/01-420			Whistler, Ken (2001-10-30), "1. SC2 M11-04", WG2 (Singapore) Resolution Consent Docket for UTC
3.2	U+FA30..FA6A	59	L2/01-405R			Moore, Lisa (2001-12-12), "Consensus 89-C20", Minutes from the UTC/L2 meeting in Mountain View, November 6-9, 2001
3.2	U+FA30..FA6A	59	L2/06-321			Whistler, Ken (2006-10-03), UCD Bug re JIS 0213
3.2	U+FA30..FA6A	59	L2/06-324R2			Moore, Lisa (2006-11-29), "Consensus 109-C16", UTC #109 Minutes, "Give U+FA30..U+FA6A the ideographic property, and fix the wordbreak property."
4.1	U+FA70..FAD9	106	L2/01-050	N2253		Umamaheswaran, V. S. (2001-01-21), "7.2.4 Proposal to add the Hanja column to 10646-1", Minutes of the SC2/WG2 meeting in Athens, September 2000
4.1	U+FA70..FAD9	106	L2/01-350	N2375		Proposal to add 160 Compatibility Hanja code table of D P R of Korea into CJK Compatibility Ideographs, 2001-09-03
4.1	U+FA70..FAD9	106	L2/02-154	N2403		Umamaheswaran, V. S. (2002-04-22), "TC 2", Draft minutes of WG 2 meeting 41, Hotel Phoenix, Singapore, 2001-10-15/19
4.1	U+FA70..FAD9	106		N2478		"Korea (DPRK):T2, USA T5", Proposed Disposition of comments on SC2 N 3584 (PDAM text for Amendment 2 to ISO/IEC 10646-1:2000), 2002-05-08
4.1	U+FA70..FAD9	106	L2/02-232	N2493		Sato, T. K.; Kobayashi, Tatsuo; Pak, Tong Gi (2002-05-22), Proposal to add 122 compatibility Hanja code table of the D P R of Korea into the CJK Compatibility Ideographs of ISO/IEC 10646-1:2000
4.1	U+FA70..FAD9	106		N2541		"USA T.8", Proposed disposition of comments on SC2 N 3624 (FPDAM text for Amendment 2 to ISO/IEC 10646-1:2000), 2002-12-02
4.1	U+FA70..FAD9	106		N2540		Freytag, Asmus (2002-12-05), Corrections to CJK Compatibility Ideographs Table in FPDAM
4.1	U+FA70..FAD9	106	L2/02-465	N2566		Collins, Lee; Freytag, Asmus (2002-12-09), Review of DPRK Compatibility Ideographs
4.1	U+FA70..FAD9	106	L2/02-471	N2572		CJK Compatibility Ideographs (Unicode 3.2, page 399), 2002-12-18
4.1	U+FA70..FAD9	106	L2/02-472	N2573		Report of DPRK compatibility characters ad hoc meeting, 2002-12-11
4.1	U+FA70..FAD9	106	L2/02-468	N2569		Suignard, Michel (2002-12-12), "USA T.5 e, USA T.8", Proposed disposition of comments on SC2 N 3624 (FPDAM text for Amendment 2 to ISO/IEC 10646-1:2000)
4.1	U+FA70..FAD9	106	L2/03-023	N2569R		Suignard, Michel (2003-01-27), "USA T.5 e, USA T.8", Disposition of Comments Report on 10646-1/FPDAM 2
4.1	U+FA70..FAD9	106	L2/03-346			Chang, Cora (2003-10-20), Analysis of characters in WG2 documents N2572, N2573
4.1	U+FA70..FAD9	106	L2/03-346.1			Chang, Cora (2003-10-20), Analysis of characters in WG2 documents N2572, N2573 [spreadsheet without glyphs]
4.1	U+FA70..FAD9	106	L2/04-207	N2776	N1062	Proposal to add 106 Compatibility Hanjas of D P R of Korea to CJK Compatibility Ideographs, 2004-05-25
4.1	U+FA70..FAD9	106	L2/04-330			Whistler, Ken (2004-08-03), "E", WG2 Consent Docket
4.1	U+FA70..FAD9	106	L2/04-316			Moore, Lisa (2004-08-19), "100-C12", UTC #100 Minutes
4.1	U+FA70..FAD9	106	L2/05-050R	N2924R		Freytag, Asmus (2005-01-28), Charts - Amendments 1 and 2 to ISO/IEC 10646:2003
4.1	U+FA70..FAD9	106	L2/10-367	N3899		KP1-0000, 2010-09-30
4.1	U+FA70..FAD9	106	L2/11-243	N4111		Sources for Orphaned CJK Ideographs, 2011-06-14
4.1	U+FA70..FAD9	106	L2/11-254			Constable, Peter (2011-06-20), "Update to UTR #45 U-Source Ideographs requested", UTC Liaison Report from WG2
4.1	U+FA70..FAD9	106		N4103		"Resolution 58.05", Unconfirmed minutes of WG 2 meeting 58, 2012-01-03
5.2	U+FA6B..FA6D	3		N3353 (pdf, doc)		Umamaheswaran, V. S. (2007-10-10), "M51.10", Unconfirmed minutes of WG 2 meeting 51 Hanzhou, China; 2007-04-24/27
5.2	U+FA6B..FA6D	3	L2/07-387			Proposal to encode six CJK Ideographs in UCS, 2007-10-17
5.2	U+FA6B..FA6D	3	L2/08-184	N3318R (pdf, appendix)		Revised proposal to encode six CJK Ideographs in UCS, 2008-03-25
5.2	U+FA6B..FA6D	3	L2/08-318	N3453 (pdf, doc)		Umamaheswaran, V. S. (2008-08-13), "M52.2k", Unconfirmed minutes of WG 2 meeting 52
5.2	U+FA6B..FA6D	3	L2/08-161R2			Moore, Lisa (2008-11-05), "Consensus 115-C14", UTC #115 Minutes
6.1	U+FA2E..FA2F	2	L2/10-087	N3747		A solution proposed by R.O.Korea for incorrectly mapped compatibility chars, 2010-03-19
6.1	U+FA2E..FA2F	2	L2/10-108			Moore, Lisa (2010-05-19), "Consensus 123-C8", UTC #123 / L2 #220 Minutes
6.1	U+FA2E..FA2F	2		N3803 (pdf, doc)		"M56.08l", Unconfirmed minutes of WG 2 meeting no. 56, 2010-09-24

== See also ==
- CJK Compatibility Ideographs Supplement
