= Asahi characters =

Forms of kanji particular to the Asahi Shimbun newspaper

Asahi characters (朝日文字, Asahi moji) are forms of kanji particular to the Asahi Shimbun newspaper. Unlike Simplified Chinese, where simplifications apply to all characters, the general custom in Japanese publications is to print jōyō/jinmeiyō kanji in simplified shinjitai forms, and to print hyōgaiji (表外字, characters outside both lists) using their original, unsimplified kyūjitai forms. For example, the jōyō kanji 齊, 齋, 劑, 濟 are printed in their shinjitai forms 斉, 斎, 剤, 済, but the hyōgaiji 臍, 纃, 薺 (also containing 齊, making simplification possible) remain unsimplified.

The Asahi Shimbun's policy, however, is always to simplify hyōgaiji in print on the model of shinjitai simplifications. For example, in Asahi Shimbun newspaper publications, 臍 (heso, "navel") would be printed as 𦜝 and 齟齬 (sogo, "discord") would be printed as 𪗱𪘚. These simplifications are known as "Asahi characters". This policy is said to have been adopted because in the age of typewriter-based printing, more complicated kanji could not be clearly printed. This newspaper also is currently the only publication using this simplification practice. These simplifications are not used in other publications by the Asahi Shimbun company.

Some of these Asahi simplifications have been included in the JIS X 0208 and above character sets, and even more (although lesser supported) are included in Unicode. Some Asahi characters have become the de facto standard forms as a result of their inclusion in the JIS standards (likely because the simplified forms are easier to display at lower sizes and resolutions), for example 鹸 in 石鹸 (sekken, "soap"), the kyūjitai form 鹼 not being included until later versions. The character 葛 (kuzu, "arrowroot") has become a source of controversy, as only the simplified form was included in the JIS standards; the kyūjitai form (using 曷) being added as a result of protest from people living in areas or with given names using this character. Simplification of the 辶 and 示 radicals is also observed by other newspaper companies.

== See also ==
- Extended shinjitai
