= Hyōgai kanji =

Japanese kanji not in the lists of jōyō kanji

Hyōgaiji (表外字; translated to "characters from outside the table/chart"), also known as hyōgai kanji (表外漢字), is a term for Japanese kanji outside the two major lists of jōyō kanji, which are taught in primary and secondary school, and the jinmeiyō kanji, which are additional kanji that are officially allowed for use in personal names. The term jōyōgai kanji (常用外漢字) is also encountered, but it designates all the kanji outside the list of jōyō kanji, including the jinmeiyō kanji.

== Number of hyōgaiji ==
Because hyōgaiji is a catch-all category for "all unlisted kanji", there is no comprehensive list, nor is there a definitive count of how many hyōgaiji exist. The highest level of the Kanji kentei (test of kanji aptitude) tests approximately 6,000 characters, of which half are hyōgaiji and 3,000 are from the official lists (2,136 jōyō kanji and 864 jinmeiyō kanji). While in principle any Chinese character or newly coined variant may be used as hyōgaiji, the Kangxi Dictionary and the 20th century Dai Kan-Wa jiten, both extremely comprehensive, contain about 47,000 and 50,000 characters, respectively, of which over 40,000 would be classed as hyōgaiji or non-standard variants if used in Japanese.

== Traditional and simplified forms ==
While many jōyō kanji are printed using new forms (shinjitai, in opposition to old forms, kyūjitai), hyōgaiji are officially printed with traditional forms such as 臍, even if some simplified variants are officially recognized in print, such as the simplified 唖, from the traditional 啞 as well as 内 from 內.

The jinmeiyō kanji list (used for names) recognizes in most cases the traditional form along with the simplified form (when one exists).

However, other unofficial simplified forms exist, known as extended shinjitai (拡張新字体, kakuchō shinjitai)—these come by applying the same simplification processes as in the development of shinjitai. The newspaper The Asahi Shimbun developed its own simplified characters, known as Asahi characters, and they have their own Unicode code points. Some of these simplifications are part of the standard JIS X 0208 and later versions. Among extended shinjitai, only a few are de facto frequently used, including 填, 頬 (extended shinjitai for the jōyō kanji 塡, 頰) or 涜, 掴 (extended shinjitai for the hyōgaiji 瀆, 摑).

=== Japanese computer fonts ===
The issue of variant non-jōyō character forms becomes apparent when using many commonly available Japanese fonts. While characters not frequently used generally retain their traditional forms, those commonly used in Japanese writing frequently are reproduced in their unofficial simplified form (extended shinjitai), rather than their official printed form. Well-known examples include:

- 繋 (tsuna(gu), "to connect") instead of standard 繫
- 掴 (tsuka(mu), "catch") with simplified phonetic component, rather than standard 摑
- 鴎 (kamome, "seagull") with simplified phonetic component, rather than standard 鷗

Some characters are provided in both their official and simplified forms, as is the case with 攪 (official printed form) and 撹 (simplified variant), but most of these characters are provided in one form only. Thus, unlike the aforementioned "Asahi characters", simplifications are not comprehensive, meaning that hyōgaiji are rendered as a mix of both standard classical forms and unofficial simplifications. This is perhaps most obvious in the archaic kanji spelling of 麺麭, pan, 'bread'. The characters, both hyōgaiji, are displayed with a simplified and an unsimplified "barley" radical side-by-side, which can be visually jarring. The lack of an unsimplified variant in many fonts leaves the user with no choice but to reproduce the word as shown above.

The use of hyōgaiji in computer fonts was brought to the fore with the 2007 launch of Mac OS X v10.5 "Leopard". This release included the fonts Hiragino Mincho Pro N and Hiragino Kaku Gothic Pro N, which reproduce hyōgaiji in their official printed forms.

A related weakness (though less relevant to modern language use) is the inability of most commercially available Japanese fonts to show the traditional forms of many jōyō kanji, particularly those whose component radicals have been comprehensively altered (such as 食 in 飲, 示 in 神, and 辵 in 運 or 連, rather than their traditional forms as used in 饅, 祀, and 迴). This is mostly an issue in the verbatim reproduction of old texts, and for academic purposes.

== Uses ==
The character 嘘 (uso, "lie, falsehood") is often mentioned as an example of a very commonly used hyōgaiji. While the official recommendation is to write the word in hiragana or katakana, a corpus survey in 2003 showed the kanji form to be by far the most common in practice. Other examples of commonly used hyōgaiji include 叩, 歪, 呆, 醤, 飴, 覗, 呑, 鮨, 掴, 噛, 頷, etc.

Hyōgaiji are often used in the names of wagashi, which draw from ancient literature.

Hyōgai kanji may be often used in manga works for stylistic purposes in character names, place names and other phrases, typically accompanied by furigana gloss to aid with their reading.

Modern Mandarin Chinese borrowings into Japanese are typically rendered with katakana like any other Japanese loanword; however, they may be sometimes stylistically spelled with their original Chinese characters and given a non-standard borrowed pronunciation, many of these characters are technically classified as hyōgaiji due to the difference in common character use between the languages. This is particularly common with mahjong terminology.

== See also ==
- List of hyōgai kanji ja.Wiktionary (in Japanese)
