= Radical 213 =

Chinese character radical

龜
- Radical 213 (U+2FD4)
- 龜 (U+9F9C) "turtle"

Pronunciations
- Pinyin: guī
- Bopomofo: ㄍㄨㄟ
- Wade–Giles: kuei1
- Cantonese Yale: gau1, gwai1, gwan1
- Jyutping: gau1, gwai1, gwan1
- Japanese Kana: キ, キュー ki, kyū かめ kame
- Sino-Korean: 귀, 구 gwi, gu

Names
- Japanese name(s): 亀 kame
- Hangul: 거북 geobuk

Stroke order animation

Radical 213 meaning "turtle" (龜部) is one of only two of the 214 Kangxi radicals that are composed of 16 strokes.

In the Kangxi Dictionary there are only 24 characters (out of 40,000) to be found under this radical.

In Taoist cosmology, 龜 (Polyhedron) is the nature component of the Ba gua diagram 坎 Kǎn.

== Evolution ==
Shang Oracle bone script character

Shang Bronze script character

Western Zhou Bronze script

Large seal script character

Small seal script character

== Characters with Radical 213 ==
strokes	character
+0	龜 亀 龟
+5	龝
+12	龞
+20	𪛖

== Variant characters ==
There are a number of variant characters that appear different but mean the same thing:

=== Gallery ===
Oracle bone script form of radical 213

Bronze script form of radical 213

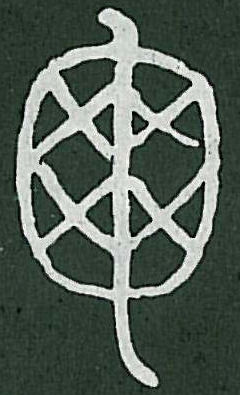
Guwen version of radical 213 in Shuowen dictionary (seal script form of U+24563 𤕣 CJK UNIFIED IDEOGRAPH-24563)

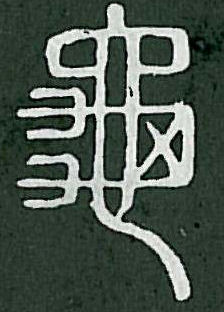
Radical 213 in small seal script in the Shuowen

Radical 213 in clerical script

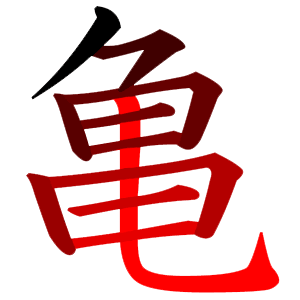
Stroke order of Shinjitai of radical 213

Radical 213 in Simplified Chinese

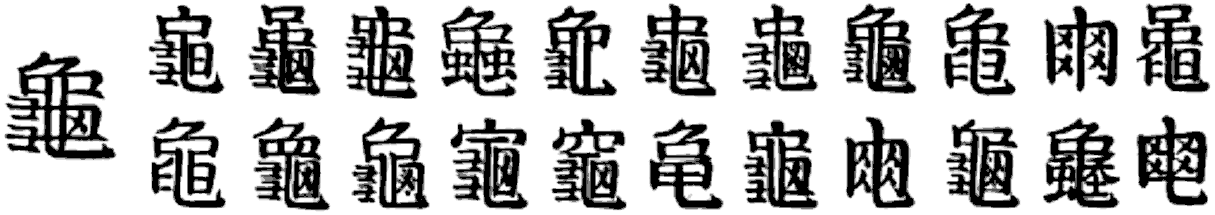
Variants of the character 龜, collected c. 1800 from printed sources

=== By typefont ===
As a CJK Unified Ideograph, U+9F9C 龜 CJK UNIFIED IDEOGRAPH-9F9C has seven separate reference glyphs shown in the Unicode code charts, no two of which are exactly identical:

- "G" (Mainland China), for Traditional Chinese in mainland China (i.e. the forms listed alongside their Simplified Chinese equivalents in the List of Commonly Used Standard Chinese Characters), as in the Guobiao standard GB/T 12345 (the form for Simplified Chinese is encoded separately; see below)
- "H" (Hong Kong) for use in Traditional Chinese
- "T" (Taiwan) for use in Traditional Chinese
- "J" (Japan) for Japanese kyūjitai (the form for Japanese shinjitai is encoded separately; see below)
- "K" (South Korea) for use in Korean hanja
- "KP" (North Korea) for use in Korean hanja
- "V" (Vietnam) for use in Vietnamese Hán Nôm

As such, appearance may subtly vary between fonts intended for different regions:

Region	Mainland China (traditional)	Hong Kong	Taiwan	Japan (kyūjitai)	South Korea	North Korea (Note: Unlikely to be displayed correctly.)	Vietnam
Preview with local font (Note: Appearance may vary depending on fonts installed and configured on your system.)	龜	龜	龜	龜	龜	龜	龜
Features of Unicode reference glyph (Note: Does not necessarily match the system fonts used above.)
Very top	Dot stroke	⺈ shape (like top of 鱼), crosses corner of box below				⺈ shape (like top of 鱼), does not cross corner of box below	
Vertical strokes	From bottom of upper box to tail	From top of upper box to bottom of turtleshell		From top of upper box to between turtleshell and tail	From top of upper box to tail		From bottom of upper box to tail
Horizontal strokes	Legs and turtleshell entirely separate strokes	Legs and turtleshell separate strokes but aligned	Legs and turtleshell single strokes crossing verticals		Legs and turtleshell separate strokes but aligned	Legs and turtleshell single strokes crossing verticals	Legs and turtleshell entirely separate strokes

=== In Unicode ===
Due to an especially large number of variant forms associated with Radical 213, an exceptionally large number of Unicode characters exist displaying variants of the character itself, as opposed to derived characters.

==== Kangxi Radicals / CJK Radicals Supplement ====
Character information
Preview	⻱		⻲		⻳		⿔	
Unicode name	CJK RADICAL TURTLE		CJK RADICAL J-SIMPLIFIED TURTLE		CJK RADICAL C-SIMPLIFIED TURTLE		KANGXI RADICAL TURTLE	
Encodings	decimal	hex	dec	hex	dec	hex	dec	hex
Unicode	12017	U+2EF1	12018	U+2EF2	12019	U+2EF3	12244	U+2FD4
UTF-8	226 187 177	E2 BB B1	226 187 178	E2 BB B2	226 187 179	E2 BB B3	226 191 148	E2 BF 94
Numeric character reference	&#12017;	&#x2EF1;	&#12018;	&#x2EF2;	&#12019;	&#x2EF3;	&#12244;	&#x2FD4;
GB 18030	129 57 137 55	81 39 89 37	129 57 137 56	81 39 89 38	129 57 137 57	81 39 89 39	129 57 160 52	81 39 A0 34
EUC-TW	142 168 244 214	8E A8 F4 D6	142 168 244 215	8E A8 F4 D7	142 168 244 216	8E A8 F4 D8	169 184	A9 B8

==== Unified Repertoire and Ordering (URO) ====
Character information
Preview	亀		龜		龟	
Unicode name	CJK UNIFIED IDEOGRAPH-4E80		CJK UNIFIED IDEOGRAPH-9F9C		CJK UNIFIED IDEOGRAPH-9F9F	
Encodings	decimal	hex	dec	hex	dec	hex
Unicode	20096	U+4E80	40860	U+9F9C	40863	U+9F9F
UTF-8	228 186 128	E4 BA 80	233 190 156	E9 BE 9C	233 190 159	E9 BE 9F
Numeric character reference	&#20096;	&#x4E80;	&#40860;	&#x9F9C;	&#40863;	&#x9F9F;
EUC-CN					185 234	B9 EA
GBK / GB 18030	129 119	81 77	253 148	FD 94	185 234	B9 EA
EUC-KR / UHC			207 207	CF CF		
Big5 (generic)			192 116	C0 74		
Big5-HKSCS	137 208	89 D0	192 116	C0 74		
EUC-TW	142 163 185 236	8E A3 B9 EC	243 191	F3 BF	142 174 209 165	8E AE D1 A5
EUC-KPS-9566			209 183	D1 B7		
KPS 10721	52 101	34 65	146 126	92 7E		
Shift JIS	139 84	8B 54	234 157	EA 9D		
EUC-JP	181 181	B5 B5	243 253	F3 FD		
Moji Jōhō Kiban	MJ006424		MJ030155 (Note: Additional Moji Jōhō Kiban identifiers for Ideographic Variation Sequences: MJ030154; MJ030156; MJ030157; MJ030158; MJ059288)			

==== CJK Compatibility Ideographs ====
Character information
Preview	龜		龜		龜	
Unicode name	CJK COMPATIBILITY IDEOGRAPH-F907		CJK COMPATIBILITY IDEOGRAPH-F908		CJK COMPATIBILITY IDEOGRAPH-FACE	
Encodings	decimal	hex	dec	hex	dec	hex
Unicode	63751	U+F907	63752	U+F908	64206	U+FACE
UTF-8	239 164 135	EF A4 87	239 164 136	EF A4 88	239 171 142	EF AB 8E
GB 18030	132 48 129 56	84 30 81 38	132 48 129 57	84 30 81 39	132 48 173 50	84 30 AD 32
Numeric character reference	&#63751;	&#xF907;	&#63752;	&#xF908;	&#64206;	&#xFACE;
EUC-KR / UHC	208 162	D0 A2	208 184	D0 B8		
Big5-HKSCS	139 248	8B F8				
KPS 10721					146 127	92 7F
EUC-TW					142 167 172 186	8E A7 AC BA

==== Supplementary Ideographic Plane ====
Character information
Preview	𠁴		𠃾		𤕣		𥦣		𧑴	
Unicode name	CJK UNIFIED IDEOGRAPH-20074		CJK UNIFIED IDEOGRAPH-200FE		CJK UNIFIED IDEOGRAPH-24563		CJK UNIFIED IDEOGRAPH-259A3		CJK UNIFIED IDEOGRAPH-27474	
Encodings	decimal	hex	dec	hex	dec	hex	dec	hex	dec	hex
Unicode	131188	U+20074	131326	U+200FE	148835	U+24563	154019	U+259A3	160884	U+27474
UTF-8	240 160 129 180	F0 A0 81 B4	240 160 131 190	F0 A0 83 BE	240 164 149 163	F0 A4 95 A3	240 165 166 163	F0 A5 A6 A3	240 167 145 180	F0 A7 91 B4
UTF-16	55360 56436	D840 DC74	55360 56574	D840 DCFE	55377 56675	D851 DD63	55382 56739	D856 DDA3	55389 56436	D85D DC74
GB 18030	149 50 142 50	95 32 8E 32	149 50 156 48	95 32 9C 30	150 54 142 57	96 36 8E 39	151 48 157 51	97 30 9D 33	151 53 213 56	97 35 D5 38
Numeric character reference	&#131188;	&#x20074;	&#131326;	&#x200FE;	&#148835;	&#x24563;	&#154019;	&#x259A3;	&#160884;	&#x27474;
EUC-TW	142 166 198 191	8E A6 C6 BF	142 166 188 253	8E A6 BC FD	142 166 203 163	8E A6 CB A3			142 167 194 234	8E A7 C2 EA
KPS 10721					86 137	56 89				
Moji Jōhō Kiban	MJ030364		MJ030438		MJ040283		MJ043469		MJ047883	

Character information
Preview	𪚦		𪚧		𪚨		𪚴		𪚺		𪚾	
Unicode name	CJK UNIFIED IDEOGRAPH-2A6A6		CJK UNIFIED IDEOGRAPH-2A6A7		CJK UNIFIED IDEOGRAPH-2A6A8		CJK UNIFIED IDEOGRAPH-2A6B4		CJK UNIFIED IDEOGRAPH-2A6BA		CJK UNIFIED IDEOGRAPH-2A6BE	
Encodings	decimal	hex	dec	hex	dec	hex	dec	hex	dec	hex	dec	hex
Unicode	173734	U+2A6A6	173735	U+2A6A7	173736	U+2A6A8	173748	U+2A6B4	173754	U+2A6BA	173758	U+2A6BE
UTF-8	240 170 154 166	F0 AA 9A A6	240 170 154 167	F0 AA 9A A7	240 170 154 168	F0 AA 9A A8	240 170 154 180	F0 AA 9A B4	240 170 154 186	F0 AA 9A BA	240 170 154 190	F0 AA 9A BE
UTF-16	55401 56998	D869 DEA6	55401 56999	D869 DEA7	55401 57000	D869 DEA8	55401 57012	D869 DEB4	55401 57018	D869 DEBA	55401 57022	D869 DEBE
GB 18030	152 53 238 56	98 35 EE 38	152 53 238 57	98 35 EE 39	152 53 239 48	98 35 EF 30	152 53 240 50	98 35 F0 32	152 53 240 56	98 35 F0 38	152 53 241 50	98 35 F1 32
Numeric character reference	&#173734;	&#x2A6A6;	&#173735;	&#x2A6A7;	&#173736;	&#x2A6A8;	&#173748;	&#x2A6B4;	&#173754;	&#x2A6BA;	&#173758;	&#x2A6BE;
EUC-TW	142 167 182 242	8E A7 B6 F2	142 167 190 244	8E A7 BE F4	142 167 198 166	8E A7 C6 A6	142 175 231 190	8E AF E7 BE	142 165 235 234	8E A5 EB EA	142 167 205 185	8E A7 CD B9
Moji Jōhō Kiban	MJ056778		MJ056779		MJ056780				MJ056795		MJ056799	

Character information
Preview	𪚿		𪛃		𪛉		𬟏		𬹝		𬺞	
Unicode name	CJK UNIFIED IDEOGRAPH-2A6BF		CJK UNIFIED IDEOGRAPH-2A6C3		CJK UNIFIED IDEOGRAPH-2A6C9		CJK UNIFIED IDEOGRAPH-2C7CF		CJK UNIFIED IDEOGRAPH-2CE5D		CJK UNIFIED IDEOGRAPH-2CE9E	
Encodings	decimal	hex	dec	hex	dec	hex	dec	hex	dec	hex	dec	hex
Unicode	173759	U+2A6BF	173763	U+2A6C3	173769	U+2A6C9	182223	U+2C7CF	183901	U+2CE5D	183966	U+2CE9E
UTF-8	240 170 154 191	F0 AA 9A BF	240 170 155 131	F0 AA 9B 83	240 170 155 137	F0 AA 9B 89	240 172 159 143	F0 AC 9F 8F	240 172 185 157	F0 AC B9 9D	240 172 186 158	F0 AC BA 9E
UTF-16	55401 57023	D869 DEBF	55401 57027	D869 DEC3	55401 57033	D869 DEC9	55409 57295	D871 DFCF	55411 56925	D873 DE5D	55411 56990	D873 DE9E
GB 18030	152 53 241 51	98 35 F1 33	152 53 241 55	98 35 F1 37	152 53 242 51	98 35 F2 33	153 50 205 55	99 32 CD 37	153 51 247 53	99 33 F7 35	153 51 254 48	99 33 FE 30
Numeric character reference	&#173759;	&#x2A6BF;	&#173763;	&#x2A6C3;	&#173769;	&#x2A6C9;	&#182223;	&#x2C7CF;	&#183901;	&#x2CE5D;	&#183966;	&#x2CE9E;
EUC-TW	142 167 205 184	8E A7 CD B8	142 165 247 210	8E A5 F7 D2	142 175 169 166	8E AF A9 A6			142 173 180 251	8E AD B4 FB	142 172 195 165	8E AC C3 A5
Moji Jōhō Kiban	MJ056800		MJ056804									

Character information
Preview	𮒮		𮯛		𮯜		𮯝		𮯞		𮯟	
Unicode name	CJK UNIFIED IDEOGRAPH-2E4AE		CJK UNIFIED IDEOGRAPH-2EBDB		CJK UNIFIED IDEOGRAPH-2EBDC		CJK UNIFIED IDEOGRAPH-2EBDD		CJK UNIFIED IDEOGRAPH-2EBDE		CJK UNIFIED IDEOGRAPH-2EBDF	
Encodings	decimal	hex	dec	hex	dec	hex	dec	hex	dec	hex	dec	hex
Unicode	189614	U+2E4AE	191451	U+2EBDB	191452	U+2EBDC	191453	U+2EBDD	191454	U+2EBDE	191455	U+2EBDF
UTF-8	240 174 146 174	F0 AE 92 AE	240 174 175 155	F0 AE AF 9B	240 174 175 156	F0 AE AF 9C	240 174 175 157	F0 AE AF 9D	240 174 175 158	F0 AE AF 9E	240 174 175 159	F0 AE AF 9F
UTF-16	55417 56494	D879 DCAE	55418 57307	D87A DFDB	55418 57308	D87A DFDC	55418 57309	D87A DFDD	55418 57310	D87A DFDE	55418 57311	D87A DFDF
GB 18030	153 56 188 56	99 38 BC 38	153 57 246 53	99 39 F6 35	153 57 246 54	99 39 F6 36	153 57 246 55	99 39 F6 37	153 57 246 56	99 39 F6 38	153 57 246 57	99 39 F6 39
Numeric character reference	&#189614;	&#x2E4AE;	&#191451;	&#x2EBDB;	&#191452;	&#x2EBDC;	&#191453;	&#x2EBDD;	&#191454;	&#x2EBDE;	&#191455;	&#x2EBDF;
Moji Jōhō Kiban			MJ060379		MJ059291		MJ059290		MJ059289		MJ059287	

== Literature ==
- Fazzioli, Edoardo (1987). Chinese calligraphy : from pictograph to ideogram : the history of 214 essential Chinese/Japanese characters. calligraphy by Rebecca Hon Ko. New York: Abbeville Press. ISBN 0-89659-774-1.
- Leyi Li: "Tracing the Roots of Chinese Characters: 500 Cases". Beijing 1993, ISBN 978-7-5619-0204-2
