= Nian, Iran =

Nian or Neyan or Niyan (Persian: نيان) may refer to:

- Nian, Hormozgan
- Nian, Kermanshah
- Nian, Razavi Khorasan
