= CJK Compatibility Ideographs Supplement =

- Range: U+2F800..U+2FA1F (544 code points)
- Plane: SIP
- Scripts: Han
- Assigned: 542 code points
- Unused: 2 reserved code points
- Source standards: CNS 11643-1992

Unicode Version History
- 3.1 (2001): 542 (+542)

Unicode documentation
- Code chart ∣ Web page

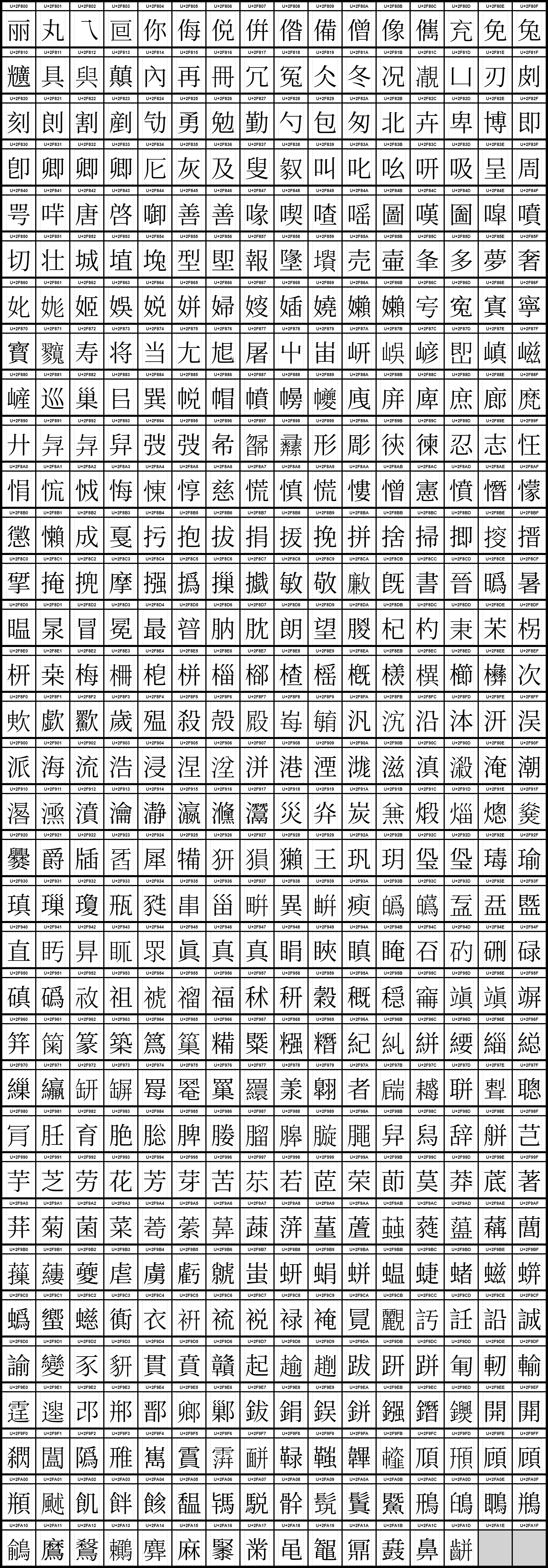
Graphical representation of the CJK Compatibility Ideographs Supplement Unicode block

CJK Compatibility Ideographs Supplement is a Unicode block containing Han characters used only for roundtrip compatibility mapping with planes 3, 4, 5, 6, 7, and 15 of CNS 11643-1992.

== Block ==
CJK Compatibility Ideographs Supplement^{[1]}^{[2]} Official Unicode Consortium code chart (PDF)
	0	1	2	3	4	5	6	7	8	9	A	B	C	D	E	F
U+2F80x	丽	丸	乁	𠄢	你	侮	侻	倂	偺	備	僧	像	㒞	𠘺	免	兔
U+2F81x	兤	具	𠔜	㒹	內	再	𠕋	冗	冤	仌	冬	况	𩇟	凵	刃	㓟
U+2F82x	刻	剆	割	剷	㔕	勇	勉	勤	勺	包	匆	北	卉	卑	博	即
U+2F83x	卽	卿	卿	卿	𠨬	灰	及	叟	𠭣	叫	叱	吆	咞	吸	呈	周
U+2F84x	咢	哶	唐	啓	啣	善	善	喙	喫	喳	嗂	圖	嘆	圗	噑	噴
U+2F85x	切	壮	城	埴	堍	型	堲	報	墬	𡓤	売	壷	夆	多	夢	奢
U+2F86x	𡚨	𡛪	姬	娛	娧	姘	婦	㛮	㛼	嬈	嬾	嬾	𡧈	寃	寘	寧
U+2F87x	寳	𡬘	寿	将	当	尢	㞁	屠	屮	峀	岍	𡷤	嵃	𡷦	嵮	嵫
U+2F88x	嵼	巡	巢	㠯	巽	帨	帽	幩	㡢	𢆃	㡼	庰	庳	庶	廊	𪎒
U+2F89x	廾	𢌱	𢌱	舁	弢	弢	㣇	𣊸	𦇚	形	彫	㣣	徚	忍	志	忹
U+2F8Ax	悁	㤺	㤜	悔	𢛔	惇	慈	慌	慎	慌	慺	憎	憲	憤	憯	懞
U+2F8Bx	懲	懶	成	戛	扝	抱	拔	捐	𢬌	挽	拼	捨	掃	揤	𢯱	搢
U+2F8Cx	揅	掩	㨮	摩	摾	撝	摷	㩬	敏	敬	𣀊	旣	書	晉	㬙	暑
U+2F8Dx	㬈	㫤	冒	冕	最	暜	肭	䏙	朗	望	朡	杞	杓	𣏃	㭉	柺
U+2F8Ex	枅	桒	梅	𣑭	梎	栟	椔	㮝	楂	榣	槪	檨	𣚣	櫛	㰘	次
U+2F8Fx	𣢧	歔	㱎	歲	殟	殺	殻	𣪍	𡴋	𣫺	汎	𣲼	沿	泍	汧	洖
U+2F90x	派	海	流	浩	浸	涅	𣴞	洴	港	湮	㴳	滋	滇	𣻑	淹	潮
U+2F91x	𣽞	𣾎	濆	瀹	瀞	瀛	㶖	灊	災	灷	炭	𠔥	煅	𤉣	熜	𤎫
U+2F92x	爨	爵	牐	𤘈	犀	犕	𤜵	𤠔	獺	王	㺬	玥	㺸	㺸	瑇	瑜
U+2F93x	瑱	璅	瓊	㼛	甤	𤰶	甾	𤲒	異	𢆟	瘐	𤾡	𤾸	𥁄	㿼	䀈
U+2F94x	直	𥃳	𥃲	𥄙	𥄳	眞	真	真	睊	䀹	瞋	䁆	䂖	𥐝	硎	碌
U+2F95x	磌	䃣	𥘦	祖	𥚚	𥛅	福	秫	䄯	穀	穊	穏	𥥼	𥪧	𥪧	竮
U+2F96x	䈂	𥮫	篆	築	䈧	𥲀	糒	䊠	糨	糣	紀	𥾆	絣	䌁	緇	縂
U+2F97x	繅	䌴	𦈨	𦉇	䍙	𦋙	罺	𦌾	羕	翺	者	𦓚	𦔣	聠	𦖨	聰
U+2F98x	𣍟	䏕	育	脃	䐋	脾	媵	𦞧	𦞵	𣎓	𣎜	舁	舄	辞	䑫	芑
U+2F99x	芋	芝	劳	花	芳	芽	苦	𦬼	若	茝	荣	莭	茣	莽	菧	著
U+2F9Ax	荓	菊	菌	菜	𦰶	𦵫	𦳕	䔫	蓱	蓳	蔖	𧏊	蕤	𦼬	䕝	䕡
U+2F9Bx	𦾱	𧃒	䕫	虐	虜	虧	虩	蚩	蚈	蜎	蛢	蝹	蜨	蝫	螆	䗗
U+2F9Cx	蟡	蠁	䗹	衠	衣	𧙧	裗	裞	䘵	裺	㒻	𧢮	𧥦	䚾	䛇	誠
U+2F9Dx	諭	變	豕	𧲨	貫	賁	贛	起	𧼯	𠠄	跋	趼	跰	𠣞	軔	輸
U+2F9Ex	𨗒	𨗭	邔	郱	鄑	𨜮	鄛	鈸	鋗	鋘	鉼	鏹	鐕	𨯺	開	䦕
U+2F9Fx	閷	𨵷	䧦	雃	嶲	霣	𩅅	𩈚	䩮	䩶	韠	𩐊	䪲	𩒖	頋	頋
U+2FA0x	頩	𩖶	飢	䬳	餩	馧	駂	駾	䯎	𩬰	鬒	鱀	鳽	䳎	䳭	鵧
U+2FA1x	𪃎	䳸	𪄅	𪈎	𪊑	麻	䵖	黹	黾	鼅	鼏	鼖	鼻	𪘀		
Notes 1.As of Unicode version 17.0 2.Grey areas indicate non-assigned code points

== History ==
The following Unicode-related documents record the purpose and process of defining specific characters in the CJK Compatibility Ideographs Supplement block:

Version	Final code points (Note: Proposed code points and characters names may differ from final code points and names)	Count	L2 ID	WG2 ID	IRG ID	Document
3.1	U+2F800..2FA1D	542	L2/00-032			Jenkins, John (2000-02-01), Compatibility Ideographs in the Unicode Standard
3.1	U+2F800..2FA1D	542	L2/00-005R2			Moore, Lisa (2000-02-14), "Compatibility Characters", Minutes of UTC #82 in San Jose
3.1	U+2F800..2FA1D	542	L2/00-049	N2159		Tseng, Shih-shyeng (2000-02-15), Proposal for Compatibility Ideographs (in Plane 2)
3.1	U+2F800..2FA1D	542	L2/00-087	N2159R		Tseng, Shih-shyeng (2000-03-10), Proposal for Compatibility Ideographs (in plane 2)
3.1	U+2F800..2FA1D	542	L2/00-099	N2196		Sato, T. K. (2000-03-15), CJK COMPATIBILITY IDEOGRAPH
3.1	U+2F800..2FA1D	542	L2/00-146	N2222R		Sato, T. K. (2000-04-21), More information needed for COMPATIBILITY IDEOGRAPHS ?
3.1	U+2F800..2FA1D	542	L2/00-147	N2223		Sato, T. K. (2000-04-21), Beyond the request of JIS COMPATIBILITY IDEOGRAPHS
3.1	U+2F800..2FA1D	542	L2/00-233	N2223R		Sato, T. K. (2000-04-21), Beyond the request of JIS COMPATIBILITY IDEOGRAPHS
3.1	U+2F800..2FA1D	542	L2/00-234	N2203 (rtf, txt)		Umamaheswaran, V. S. (2000-07-21), "7.3", Minutes from the SC2/WG2 meeting in Beijing, 2000-03-21 -- 24
3.1	U+2F800..2FA1D	542	L2/00-270			Suignard, Michel (2000-08-08), 10646-2 FCD: Comments on TCA CJK Compatibility
3.1	U+2F800..2FA1D	542	L2/00-187			Moore, Lisa (2000-08-23), "Motion 84-M9", UTC minutes -- Boston, August 8-11, 2000
3.1	U+2F800..2FA1D	542	L2/00-272	N2237		Suignard, Michel (2000-08-23), "T.10 Clause 11: Compatibility characters; T.12 Annex A.1", Comments accompanying the US positive vote on the CD ISO/IEC 10646-2
3.1	U+2F800..2FA1D	542		N2284		CJK Unified Ideographs Extension B for preDIS 10646-2, 2000-09-14
3.1	U+2F800..2FA1D	542	L2/00-334	N2270		Shih-Shyeng, Tseng (2000-09-15), Updated CJK Compatibility Ideographs sets from TCA
3.1	U+2F800..2FA1D	542	L2/00-369			Whistler, Ken (2000-10-06), "1.f CJK Compatibility Ideographs Supplement (Plane 2)", WG2 in Vouliagmeni (Athens)
3.1	U+2F800..2FA1D	542	L2/01-050	N2253		Umamaheswaran, V. S. (2001-01-21), "7.18 and 8.1", Minutes of the SC2/WG2 meeting in Athens, September 2000
3.1	U+2F800..2FA1D	542	L2/03-399			Fok, Anthony (2003-10-13), Unihan reported errors / changes re kHKSCS entries
3.1	U+2F800..2FA1D	542	L2/03-367	N2667		Suignard, Michel; Muller, Eric; Jenkins, John (2003-10-22), CJK Ideograph source references corrections
3.1	U+2F800..2FA1D	542	L2/03-398			Nguyen, D. (2003-10-29), Unihan reported errors / changes re kCowles
3.1	U+2F800..2FA1D	542	L2/04-209	N2775R	N1063	Proposal to add 13 KP source reference to existing CJK Compatibility Characters, 2004-05-25
3.1	U+2F800..2FA1D	542	L2/10-100	N3787		Request for disunifying U+2F89F from U+5FF9, 2010-04-07
3.1	U+2F800..2FA1D	542	L2/10-218		N1666	Error report on U+225D6 AND U+2F89F, 2010-06-24
3.1	U+2F800..2FA1D	542	L2/11-243	N4111		Sources for Orphaned CJK Ideographs, 2011-06-14
3.1	U+2F800..2FA1D	542	L2/11-254			Constable, Peter (2011-06-20), "Update to UTR #45 U-Source Ideographs requested", UTC Liaison Report from WG2
3.1	U+2F800..2FA1D	542		N4103		"Resolution 58.05", Unconfirmed minutes of WG 2 meeting 58, 2012-01-03
3.1	U+2F800..2FA1D	542	L2/14-260	N4621		Suignard, Michel (2014-10-23), CJK chart and source references update
3.1	U+2F800..2FA1D	542	L2/16-052	N4603 (pdf, doc)		Umamaheswaran, V. S. (2015-09-01), "M63.05", Unconfirmed minutes of WG 2 meeting 63
3.1	U+2F800..2FA1D	542	L2/19-239	N5080	N2338	TCA's feedback to IRG N2338 [Affects U+2F878, U+2F8F0, and U+2FA02], 2019-05-14
3.1	U+2F800..2FA1D	542	L2/19-240	N5081	N2337	Disunification of U+2F83B/U+5406, 2019-05-14
3.1	U+2F800..2FA1D	542	L2/19-237	N5068		Editorial Report on Miscellaneous Issues (meeting IRG#52) [Affects U+2F83B, U+2F878, U+2F8D6, U+2F8D7, U+2F8DA, U+2F8F0, U+2F984, and U+2FA02], 2019-05-17
3.1	U+2F800..2FA1D	542	L2/19-241	N5083	N2391	Errata report for WG2 submission_TCA [Affects U+2F8D6, U+2F8D7, U+2F8DA, and U+2F984], 2019-05-31
3.1	U+2F800..2FA1D	542	L2/22-077		N2512R	Shin, SangHyun; Cho, Sungduk; Kim, Kyongsok (2021-11-02), A revised proposal requesting a Horizontal Extension of 51 Hanja chars (previously submitted for ExtF/G/H) [Affects U+2F8B1]
3.1	U+2F800..2FA1D	542	L2/22-067			Lunde, Ken (2022-04-16), "19 [Affects U+2F8B1]", CJK & Unihan Group Recommendations for UTC #171 Meeting
3.1	U+2F800..2FA1D	542	L2/22-061			Constable, Peter (2022-07-27), "E.1 Section 19 [Affects U+2F8B1]", Approved Minutes of UTC Meeting 171

== See also ==
- CJK Unified Ideographs
- CJK Compatibility Ideographs
