= Nian (disambiguation) =

Nian may refer to:

- Nian (年), a Chinese mythological creature
- Nian Rebellion, an armed uprising in China, 1851–1868
- Nian, Iran (disambiguation), places in Iran
- Nian gao (年糕), Chinese food
- Nian (surname)
- Nian Hu, real name of American musician Nina Dopamine
