= Extended shinjitai =

Extended simplication of kanji

Extended shinjitai (Japanese: 拡張新字体, Hepburn: kakuchō shinjitai, lit. 'extended new character form') is the extension of the shinjitai (officially simplified kanji). They are the simplified versions of some of the hyōgaiji (表外字, kanji not included in the jōyō kanji list). They are unofficial characters; the official forms of these hyōgaiji are still kyūjitai (traditional characters).

== Simplified forms ==
When the 1,850 character-long tōyō kanji list was produced in 1949, many characters were simplified from their original forms, and the new simpler forms became the standard kanji used in Japanese writing. For instance, the characters 學, 國, and 體 became 学, 国, and 体, respectively. The jōyō kanji list, issued in 1981, contained additional simplifications such as 罐, 螢, and 龍 becoming 缶, 蛍, and 竜. In addition, the character 燈, which had already been included during the formation of the tōyō kanji list, became 灯. A total of 357 characters were reformed from kyūjitai (old character form) to become shinjitai (new character form) when the jōyō kanji list was created (辨, 瓣, and 辯 were merged into a single character: 弁, bringing the total number of new shinjitai down to 355).

However, as a result of adopting simplified characters, kanji that shared the same structural elements (radicals or other phono-semantic compounds) were not all simplified in the same way. For instance, 賣, 續, and 讀, which were included in the list, were simplified as 売, 続, and 読, although the first one is not the same component but simply looks similar. On the other hand, the hyōgaiji 贖, 犢, and 牘 – which contain the same element (𧶠) as the latter two of the three previous kanji – were not likewise given simplified counterparts. This problem arose from reforming only the most common characters rather than decomposing all characters into radicals and other constructs. This was done systematically for simplified Chinese characters, although even in there many exceptions to the rule exist.

== Creation of extended shinjitai ==
The Asahi Shimbun newspaper developed its own script known as Asahi characters, which applied the rationale of simplification to characters other than jōyō kanji. In this script, the right element of the three aforementioned unsimplified characters (贖, 犢, and 牘) were all simplified to 売. Characters that were simplified in this way are called extended shinjitai, as simplification was extended to characters outside of the jōyō kanji list.

Extended shinjitai was also implemented into JIS kanji. The first version of JIS (JIS C 6226-1978), created in 1978, contained 10 characters that were simplified in this way, such as 噓 and 叛.

JIS X 0208, created in 1983, was the first JIS character set to extensively use extended shinjitai, adopting simplifications for a large number of previously unsimplified characters. In total, 299 characters such as 鴎 (鷗), 涜 (瀆), 溌 (潑), 逢, 飴 (or 301 characters, when including 曾 and 訛) were simplified from their original forms. Simplified forms had never been used in printing these characters prior to this reform. However, the character set became subject to criticism when it was revealed that the character 鷗 in the name "森鷗外" (Mori Ōgai, a famous Japanese poet and novelist) could only be represented in word processors in its simplified form (鴎).

Examples of extended shinjitai
Formal	Extended	Notes
鷽	鴬	鷽 (uso, bullfinch) and 鶯 (uguisu, Japanese bush warbler) are different species of birds, but both kanji share the same glyph within the extended shinjitai, namely 鴬. In simplified Chinese, the character of 鷽 becomes 鸴, whereas 鶯 is 莺.
鶯	鴬	鷽 (uso, bullfinch) and 鶯 (uguisu, Japanese bush warbler) are different species of birds, but both kanji share the same glyph within the extended shinjitai, namely 鴬. In simplified Chinese, the character of 鷽 becomes 鸴, whereas 鶯 is 莺.
攪	撹	Within the Hyōgai Kanji Jitaihyō (表外漢字字体表), the traditional form 攪 was recognized as a standard printed font (印刷標準字体), while 撹 was classified as a simplified conventional font (簡易慣用字体).
摑*	掴	
簞	箪	
瀆*	涜	
儘	侭	儘 and 盡 are merged to 尽 in simplified Chinese.
藪	薮	
籠	篭	

- Characters marked * are environment-dependent characters (環境依存文字).

== Reduction of extended shinjitai ==
Established in 1990, the JIS X 0212 set of auxiliary characters supplemented the previous character set by including both the traditional and simplified forms of certain characters. For instance, the traditional 鷗, 瀆, and 潑 characters were included, in addition to the simplified 鴎, 涜, and 溌 characters. However, usage of these auxiliary characters in the Shift JIS computer encoding was not taken into consideration, and most word processors remained unable to display these traditional characters. The Japanese Language Council meeting of 1992 confirmed the need for a unified character set that could be used in all computers and word processors.

Released in February 2000, the JIS X 0213-2000 character set was presented as a solution to the problems of the previous character set, as the Shift JIS encoding was expanded to re-include traditional characters such as 鷗, 瀆, and 潑. In December of the same year, the Japanese Language Council compiled a list of 22 widely used extended shinjitai, designated as kan'ikanyōjitai (簡易慣用字体, simple common-use character forms), and approved their use in place of their traditional variants in print.

JIS X 0213-2004 (released in 2004) made minor modifications to the script, changing character shapes and strokes. For characters that are not in the jōyō kanji list, the shinnyō radical (⻌) was changed from having a single dot into a double-dot variant. The Windows Vista operating system, released in January 2007, conformed to these modifications, but confusion resulted in cases where the single dot was automatically changed to double dots in, for instance, surnames written using the character 辻.

The Asahi Shimbun newspaper also modified its characters to conform to the new standards, and altered their Asahi characters in January 2007.

In the latest 2010 jōyō reform, taking the aforementioned ⻌ radical as an example, the previous logic of one-dot corresponding to jōyō and two-dot to non-jōyō was eliminated, as for instance 謎 ("riddle") is now a jōyō kanji. This reform also clashes with established JIS X 0208 use, as in some cases less common unsimplified characters have been elevated to jōyō status in favor of variant characters with established use - for instance, as per the official jōyō table, the second character in 装填 ("reload") should be 塡. For the most part unsimplified characters have been added to the jōyō table with this reform, except for three previous simplified forms (曽, 痩 and 麺), and some extended shinjitai like 艶 in favor of 艷.

Nevertheless, the 2010 guidelines by the Japanese government also explicitly allow simplification in handwriting and do not object to use of alternate characters in electronic text, likely in recognition of established technical standards.

== See also ==
- Shinjitai
- Japanese script reform
- List of hyōgai kanji ja.Wiktionary (in Japanese)
