= Nian, Hormozgan =

Nian نيان
- Village
- Location within Iran
- Coordinates: 27°32′59″N 56°49′42″E
- Country: Iran
- Province: Hormozgan
- County: Bandar Abbas
- Bakhsh: shamil district
- Rural District: Shamil

Population (2006)
  - Total: 292
- Time zone: UTC+3:30 (IRST)
  - Summer (DST): UTC+4:30 (IRDT)

Nian (Persian: نيان, also Romanized as Nīān, Neyān, and Nīyān; also known as Nuyān) is a village in Shamil Rural District, shamil District, Bandar Abbas County, Hormozgan Province, Iran. At the 2006 census, its population was 292, in 75 families.
