= 兩 =

兩, 两, or 両 may refer to:

- Japanese ryō, a Japanese unit of weight and currency using Koban (Japanese gold coin)
- Korean yang, the currency of Korea between 1892 and 1902
- Liǎng or Tael, a Chinese unit of weight and currency using silver ingots called "Sycee"
