= Shinjitai =

Modern forms of kanji used in Japan after 1946

Japanese name
- Hiragana: しんじたい
- Katakana: シンジタイ
- Kyūjitai: 新字體
- Shinjitai: 新字体
Transcriptions
- Revised Hepburn: Shinjitai
- Kunrei-shiki: Sinzitai

Shinjitai (Japanese: 新字体; 'new character form') are the simplified forms of kanji used in Japan since the promulgation of the tōyō kanji list in 1946. Some of the new forms found in shinjitai are also found in simplified Chinese characters, but shinjitai is generally not as extensive in the scope of its modification.

Shinjitai were created by reducing the number of strokes in kyūjitai ("old character form") or seiji (正字; "proper/correct characters"), which is unsimplified kanji (usually similar to traditional Chinese characters). This simplification was achieved through a process (similar to that of simplified Chinese) of either replacing the onpu (音符, "sound mark") indicating the on reading with another onpu of the same on reading with fewer strokes, or replacing a complex component of a character with a simpler one.

There have been a few stages of simplifications made since the 1950s, but the only changes that became official were the changes in the jōyō kanji list in 1981 and 2010.

== Background ==
The following forms were established as a result of the post-war character reforms. Many were based on widely used handwritten abbreviations (略字, ryakuji) from the prewar era.

Kyūjitai	→	Shinjitai	On'yomi	Kun'yomi	Meaning
鐵	→	鉄	テツ tetsu	くろがね kurogane	n. 'iron'
與	→	与	ヨ yo	あた(える) ata(eru)	v. 'give'
學	→	学	ガク gaku	まな(ぶ) mana(bu)	n. 'study'
體	→	体	タイ tai	からだ karada	n. 'body'
臺	→	台	ダイ dai		n. pedestal
國	→	国	コク koku	くに kuni	n. 'country', 'kingdom', 'nation'
關	→	関	カン kan	せき seki	n. 'gate'
寫	→	写	シャ sha	うつ(す) utsu(su)	v. 'copy'
廣	→	広	コウ kō	ひろ(い) hiro(i)	n. 'expansive', 'wide'
狀	→	状	ジョウ jō		n. '(ontological) form'
歸	→	帰	キ ki	かえ(る) kae(ru)	v. return
齒	→	歯	シ shi	は ha	n. tooth
步	→	歩	ホ ho フ fu ブ bu	ある(く) aru(ku)	v. walk
圓	→	円	エン en	まる(い) maru(i)	n. 'circle', 'Japanese yen'; adj. 'round', 'circular'
區	→	区	ク ku	く ku	n. '(administrative) ward'

In 332 cases, characters in the new standard have fewer strokes than old forms, in 14 cases they have the same number, and in 11 cases they have one more stroke. The most drastic simplification was 廳→庁, removing 20 strokes.

=== Unofficial simplifications ===
The simplification in shinjitai were only officially applied to characters in the Tōyō and Jōyō Kanji Lists, with the kyūjitai forms remaining the official forms of hyōgaiji (表外字; characters not included in the Tōyō and Jōyō Kanji Lists). For example, the character 擧 (KYO, agaru, ageru; raise [an example]) was simplified as 挙, but the character 欅 (keyaki; zelkova tree) which also contained 擧, remained unsimplified due to its status as a Hyōgaiji.

Despite this, simplified forms of hyōgaiji do exist in Japanese character sets, and are referred to as extended shinjitai (拡張新字体). However, they are to be seen as unofficial, a position reiterated in the National Language Council's 2000 report on Characters Not Listed in the Jōyō Kanji Table.

The Asahi Shimbun newspaper is thorough in its simplification of hyōgaiji, and its in-house simplifications are called Asahi characters. For example, 痙攣 (KEIREN; cramp, spasm, convulsion) is simplified following the model of 經→経 and 攣→挛. This is also said to have been done because in the age of typewriter-based printing, more complicated kanji could not be clearly printed.

The Japanese Industrial Standards (JIS) contain numerous simplified forms of Kanji following the model of the shinjitai simplifications, such as 﨔 (the simplified form of 欅); many of these are included in Unicode, but are not present in most kanji character sets.

Ryakuji for handwriting use, such as the abbreviations for 門 (in simplified Chinese, this abbreviation, 门, has become official) and 第 (which exists in Unicode as 㐧) are not a part of the shinjitai reforms and therefore do not carry official status.

== Methods of simplifying Kanji ==
=== Adoption of grass script forms ===
Cursive script (also known as grass script) and semi-cursive script forms of kanji were adopted as shinjitai. Examples include:

- 圖→図
- 觀→観
- 示 (religion/ceremony radical) →礻
- 晝→昼

=== Standardization and unification of character forms ===
Characters in which there were two or more variants were standardized under one form. The character 島 (TŌ, shima; island) also had the variant forms 嶋 (still seen in proper names) and 嶌, but only the 島 form became standard. The 辶 radical was previously printed with two dots (as in the hyōgaiji 逞) but was written with one (as in 道), so the written form with one dot became standard. The upper 丷 portion of the characters 半, 尊, and 平 was previously printed as 八 and written 丷 (as in the aforementioned examples), but the old printed form is still seen in the hyōgaiji characters 絆 and 鮃. The character 青 (SEI, SHŌ, ao; blue) was once printed as 靑 but written as 青, so the written form became standard; the old printed form is still found in the standard form in hyōgaiji characters such as 鯖 and 蜻, but 青 is used in some fonts.

=== Change of character indicating On reading ===
Characters of the keisei moji (形声文字) group each contain a semantic component and a phonetic component. A choice was made to replace the phonetic parts with homophones which had fewer strokes. For example, 圍 was changed to 囲, because 韋 and 井 were homophones.

Other simplifications of this method include 竊→窃, 廳→庁, 擔→担. There are also colloquial handwritten simplifications (otherwise known as ryakuji) based on this model, in which various non-kanji symbols are used as onpu, for example 魔 (MA; demon) [simplification: ⿸广マ, 广+マ {Katakana ma}], 慶 (KEI; jubilation) [⿸广K, 广+K], 藤 (TŌ, fuji; wisteria) [⿱艹ト, 艹+ト {Katakana to}], and 機 (KI; machine, opportunity) [⿰木キ, 木+キ {Katakana ki}].

=== Adoption of variant characters ===
In some cases a standard character was replaced by a variant character that neither is a graphical variant nor shares an On reading, but had a historical basis for standardisation. Examples include 證 → 証 and 燈 → 灯, replacing 登 → 正 and 登 → 丁 respectively. In both cases the variant character had a different meaning and reading but was adopted due to its lower stroke count anyway.

=== Removal of components ===
Some kanji were simplified by removing entire components. For example,

- The 倠 portion of 應 was removed to become 応
- 藝→芸
- 罐→缶
- 縣→県
- 絲→糸
- 蟲→虫
- 餘→余

=== Adding a stroke ===
In five basic cases and six derivations for a total of eleven cases, kanji were modified by adding a stroke, thereby rendering the composition more regular:

- 步→歩 (涉→渉, 頻→頻) – the bottom component becomes the common 少. However, the character 捗 was not modified (Compare with the section "Inconsistencies").
- 賓︀→賓 – similarly
- 卷→巻 (圈→圏) – the bottom becomes 己
- 綠→緑 (錄→録) – the top right becomes 彐
- 免 (勉, 晚→晩) – formerly the middle stroke was part of the lower left stroke, now these are separate, so the lower two strokes form the common 儿
- 卑 (碑) – formerly the small stroke at upper left of 十 was part of the vertical stroke in 田, but now it is a separate stroke.

== Inconsistencies ==
Simplification was not carried out uniformly. Firstly, only a select group of characters (the common jōyō kanji) was simplified, with characters outside this group (the hyōgaiji) generally retaining their earlier form. For example, 賣, 續 and 讀 (with the right-side element in the latter two not being identical, but merely graphically similar) were simplified as 売, 続, and 読, respectively, but the hyōgaiji 贖, 犢 and 牘, which contain the same element (𧶠), were kept in use in their unsimplified variants.

Secondly, even when a simplification was done in some characters within this group, the analogous simplification was not applied to all characters. For instance, the character 龍, meaning "dragon", was simplified in isolation and in some compound characters, but not others. The character itself was simplified to 竜, as was the compound character 瀧 ("waterfall") → 滝; however, it was not simplified in the characters 襲 ("attack") and 籠 ("basket"), although an extended shinjitai variant, 篭, exists for the latter, and is used in practice rather often over the official variant, for instance in 篭手 vs. 籠手 ("gauntlet"). Note that despite simplification 龍 can still be found in Japanese.

Conversely, the character 貫 ("pierce") was not simplified, nor was the compound character 慣 ("accustomed"), but in the other compound character 實 it was simplified, resulting in 実 ("truth").

Similarly, 卒 ("graduate") has been kept unsimplified in isolation, but in compounds has been simplified to 卆, such as 醉 to 酔 "drunk"; 專 has been simplified to 云 in some characters, such as 傳 to 伝 ("transmit"), and 轉 to 転 ("revolve"), but it takes a different form in 團, where instead of changing the phonetic element in a regular manner to get the expected 囩 it is shortened to the meaningless component 寸, producing 団.

The latest 2010 jōyō kanji reform has added additional inconsistencies in this regard as in some instances radicals that were previously uniformly simplified across the jōyō set now first appeared in their traditional variants in some of the new jōyō characters; contrary to prior practice no new simplifications of characters have been carried out, likely in consideration of established JIS character set use spanning decades at this point. Compare 飮 → 飲 ("drink") to 2010 jōyō 餌 ("fodder, bait"), or 錢 → 銭 ("coin") to 2010 jōyō 箋 ("label"). For the latter an analogically simplified 䇳 character does exist, but was likely ignored due to having no history of use in Japanese character sets. On the other hand, former extended shinjitai 艶 ("luster") has been added in favor of 艷.

Nevertheless, the guidelines published by the Japanese government explicitly permit simplification in handwriting, and do not object to use of alternate characters in electronic text.

== Simplifications in jōyō and jinmeiyō kanji ==
In the 2,136 jōyō kanji, there are 364 pairs of simplified and traditional characters. The kanji 弁 is used to simplify three different traditional kanji (辨, 瓣, and 辯). Of these 364 traditional characters, 212 are still used as jinmeiyō kanji in names. The jinmeiyō kanji List also includes 631 kanji that are not elements of the jōyō Kanji List; 18 of them have a variant. For a list of traditional and modern forms of jōyō and jinmeiyō kanji, see Kyūjitai.

=== Traditional characters that may cause problems displaying ===
Due to Han unification, some shinjitai characters are unified with their kyūjitai counterparts. Within the jōyō kanji, there are 62 characters whose kyūjitai forms may cause problems displaying:

海 社 勉 暑 漢 神 福 練 者 都 器 殺 祝 節 梅 類 祖 勤 穀 視 署 層 著 諸 難 朗 欄 廊 虜 隆 塚 祥 侮 僧 免 卑 喝 嘆 塀 墨 悔 慨 憎 懲 敏 既 煮 碑 祉 祈 禍 突 繁 臭 褐 謁 謹 賓 贈 逸 響 頻

These characters are Unicode CJK Unified Ideographs for which the old form (kyūjitai) and the new form (shinjitai) have been unified under the Unicode standard. Although the old and new forms are distinguished under the JIS X 0213 standard, the old forms map to Unicode CJK Compatibility Ideographs which are considered by Unicode to be canonically equivalent to the new forms, and may not be distinguished by user agents. Therefore, depending on the user environment, it may not be possible to see the distinction between old and new forms of the characters. In particular, all Unicode normalization methods merge the old characters with the new ones.

蘒 (U+8612), which is not jōyō, is displayed as an (extended) shinjitai character; its kyūjitai counterpart is considered as a duplicate, and is thus not unified, even though some fonts such as Source Han Sans may treat it as unified.

== Controversies ==
Like one of the controversial aspects of simplified Chinese, some shinjitai were originally separate characters with different meanings. For example, the kanji 藝 (GEI; performance, accomplishment) was simplified to 芸, but 芸 was originally a separate character read with the On reading UN. Many of the original characters that have become merged are no longer used in modern Japanese: for example, 豫 (YO, arakaji(me); in advance) and 餘 (YO, ama(ri); excess) were merged with 予 and 余, respectively, both archaic kanji for the first person pronoun "I". However, 芸 poses a problem, in that Japan's first public library, Untei (芸亭) (built during the Nara Period), uses this character. This character also has significance in classical Japanese literature, and Japanese history books have had to distinguish between the two by writing UN using the old form of the 艹 radical, (艸).

== Differences in simplification between Chinese and Japanese ==
Mainland China, Singapore, Malaysia, and Japan simplified their writing systems independently from each other. After World War II, poor relations prevented cooperation between the nations. Traditional Chinese characters are still officially used in Hong Kong, Macau, Taiwan, and South Korea (as a supplement to Hangul, but they are no longer used in North Korea), and by many overseas Chinese.

In Chinese, many more characters were simplified than in Japanese; some characters were simplified only in the one language, but not in the other; other characters were simplified in the same way in both languages, others in different ways. This means that those who want to learn the writing systems of both Chinese and Japanese must sometimes learn three different variations of one character: traditional Chinese, simplified Chinese, and modern Japanese (e.g. 龍 - 龙 - 竜 for "dragon").

	traditional Chinese	simplified Chinese	modern Japanese	meaning
No simplification in either language Same Unicode character but appearance may vary with script; see Han unification	悲	悲	悲	sad
Same simplification in both languages	獻	献	献	offer
Simplified in Chinese only	緊	紧	緊	tight
Simplified in Japanese only	惠	惠	恵	benefit
Different simplifications in Chinese and Japanese	棧	栈	桟	stack
Chinese simplification more drastic	驅	驱	駆	drive
Japanese simplification more drastic	圓	圆	円	round
