= 梅 =

梅 may refer to:

- Prunus mume
- Mei (surname)
