= 飯 =

飯, meaning "cooked rice", may refer to:

- Rice in Chinese cuisine
- Meshi, rice in Japanese cuisine

== See also ==
- Bap (food) (rice in Korean cuisine), which is a native Korean word rather than a Sino-Korean word
- Rice dishes in Vietnamese cuisine, called cơm, which is a native Vietnamese word rather than a Sino-Vietnamese word
