= 了 =

了 is a Chinese character meaning "completion" or "understanding." It may refer to:

- le, marker for the perfective aspect in standard Chinese grammar
- Satoru, Japanese masculine given name
- Ryō (given name), Japanese unisex given name
- “Forty” for Khitan small script
