= 神 =

神 is a Chinese character meaning "spirit" or "deity". It may refer to:

- Kami, the deities, divinities, spirits, mythological, spiritual, or natural phenomena that are venerated in the Shinto religion
- Shen (Chinese religion), a Chinese word with senses of deity, god or spirit
