= 宁 =

宁 may refer to:

- Ning (surname), an uncommon Chinese surname
- Nanjing, a city in China (an abbreviation of the former name Jiangning)
- Ningxia, an autonomous region of China (an abbreviation formed by taking the first character)

== See also ==
- All English Wikipedia redirects and disambiguation pages starting with "宁"
