= Jinmeiyō kanji =

List of Chinese characters used in Japanese names

The jinmeiyō kanji (人名用漢字; Japanese pronunciation: [dʑimmeːjoːkaꜜɲdʑi], lit. 'kanji for use in personal names') are a set of 864 kanji known as "name kanji" in English. They are a supplementary list of characters that can legally be used in registered personal names in Japan, despite not being in the official list of "commonly used characters" (jōyō kanji). "Jinmeiyō kanji" is sometimes used to refer to the characters in both the jinmeiyō and jōyō lists because some Japanese names do not require the specified jinmeiyō kanji and are written entirely in jōyō kanji. Hence, jōyō kanji can also be viewed as a subset of jinmeiyō kanji.

A ministerial decree of 1946 limited the number of officially sanctioned kanji for public use to the 1,850 tōyō kanji. Only kanji on this list were acceptable as registered names, despite the fact that the list excluded many kanji frequently used in names up to that point. However, on May 25, 1951, the cabinet extended the set of characters usable in names by specifying the first 90 jinmeiyō kanji.

Over the years, the Minister of Justice has increased the number of name kanji, and has a plan for further addition in response to requests from parents. As of April 30, 2009, there were 985 jinmeiyō kanji, but this number was reduced to 861 in late 2010 when 129 jinmeiyō characters were transferred to the jōyō kanji list, and 5 characters were transferred from the jōyō list to the jinmeiyō list. The jinmeiyō list was subsequently updated in 2015, 2017, and 2026, with one character being added each time, bringing the total number of characters to 864.

In Japan, name kanji are taught at the junior-high level.

== History ==
Date	jōyō kanji		jinmeiyō kanji outside of jōyō kanji		Grand total	Changes
Date	Unique letters	Variants	Unique letters	Variants	Grand total	Changes
1946	1,850	-	0	-	1,850	A list of tōyō kanji was established
January 1, 1948	1,850	-	0	-	1,850	Characters outside of tōyō kanji were not allowed in naming children
May 25, 1951	1,850	-	92	-	1,942	+92 丑 丞 乃 之 也 亙 亥 亦 亨 亮 仙 伊 匡 卯 只 吾 呂 哉 嘉 圭 奈 宏 寅 尚 巌 巳 庄 弘 弥 彦 悌 敦 昌 晃 晋 智 暢 朋 杉 桂 桐 楠 橘 欣 欽 毅 浩 淳 熊 爾 猪 玲 琢 瑞 甚 睦 磨 磯 祐 禄 禎 稔 穣 綾 惣 聡 肇 胤 艶 蔦 藤 蘭 虎 蝶 輔 辰 郁 酉 錦 鎌 靖 須 馨 駒 鯉 鯛 鶴 鹿 麿 斉 龍 亀
July 30, 1976	1,850	-	120	-	1,970	+28 佑 允 冴 喬 怜 悠 旭 杏 梓 梢 梨 沙 渚 瑠 瞳 紗 紘 絢 翠 耶 芙 茜 葵 藍 那 阿 隼 鮎
October 1, 1981	1,945	195	166	10	2,316	jōyō kanji list introduced -8 absorbed into jōyō 仙 尚 杉 甚 磨 斉 龍 悠 +54 伍 伶 侑 尭 孟 峻 嵩 嶺 巴 彬 惇 惟 慧 斐 旦 昂 李 栗 楓 槙 汐 洵 洸 渥 瑛 瑶 璃 甫 皓 眸 矩 碧 笹 緋 翔 脩 苑 茉 莉 萌 萩 蓉 蕗 虹 諒 赳 迪 遥 遼 霞 頌 駿 鳩 鷹
March 1, 1990	1,945	195	284	10	2,434	+118 伎 伽 侃 倖 倭 偲 冶 凌 凜 凪 捺 於 旺 昴 晏 晟 晨 暉 曙 朔 凱 勁 叡 叶 唄 啄 奎 媛 嬉 宥 崚 嵐 嵯 巽 彗 彪 恕 憧 拳 捷 杜 柊 柚 柾 栞 梧 椋 椎 椰 椿 楊 榛 槻 樺 檀 毬 汀 汰 洲 湧 滉 漱 澪 熙 燎 燦 燿 爽 玖 琳 瑚 瑳 皐 眉 瞭 碩 秦 稀 稜 竣 笙 紬 絃 綜 綸 綺 耀 胡 舜 芹 茄 茅 莞 菖 菫 蒔 蒼 蓮 蕉 衿 袈 裟 詢 誼 諄 邑 醇 采 雛 鞠 颯 魁 鳳 鴻 鵬 麟 黎 黛
December 3, 1997	1,945	195	285	10	2,435	+1 琉
February 23, 2004	1,945	195	286	10	2,436	+1 曽
June 7, 2004	1,945	195	287	10	2,437	+1 獅
July 12, 2004	1,945	196	289	10	2,440	+3 毘 瀧 駕
September 27, 2004	1,945	209	755	19	2,928	+488 串 乎 云 些 仔 佃 俄 俠 俣 俐 侶 俺 俱 倦 僅 傭 儲 兎 兜 其 冥 凄 凛 凧 凰 函 刹 劉 劫 勃 勾 匂 勿 廿 卜 卿 厨 厩 叉 叢 吞 吻 哨 哩 喧 喰 喋 嘩 嘗 噌 噂 圃 坐 堯 坦 埼 埴 堆 堰 堺 堵 塙 塞 塡 壕 壬 夷 奄 套 妖 娃 姪 姥 娩 宋 宛 宕 寓 寵 尖 尤 屑 岡 峨 崖 已 巷 巾 帖 幌 幡 庇 庚 庵 廟 廻 弛 徠 忽 恢 恰 惚 悉 惹 惺 憐 戊 或 戚 戟 戴 托 按 拶 拭 挨 捉 挺 挽 掬 捲 捻 捧 掠 揃 摑 摺 撒 撰 撞 播 撫 擢 孜 斑 斡 斧 斯 昊 昏 昧 晄 晒 晦 曖 曝 曳 曾 杖 杭 杵 枕 杷 枇 柑 柴 柵 柿 柘 栃 柏 桧 檜 桔 桁 栖 梗 梛 梯 桶 梶 椛 梁 椅 棲 椀 楯 楚 楕 楢 榎 榊 槇 槍 槌 樫 樟 樋 樽 橙 檎 櫂 櫛 櫓 歎 此 殆 汝 汎 汲 沌 沓 沫 洛 浬 淵 淀 淋 湘 湊 湛 溢 溜 漕 漣 濡 瀕 灘 灸 灼 烏 焰 焚 煌 煎 煤 煉 燕 燭 爪 牒 牙 牟 牡 牽 犀 狼 玩 珂 珈 珊 珀 琥 琶 琵 瓜 瓢 瓦 甥 畏 畠 畢 畿 疋 疏 瘦 瞥 砦 砥 砧 硯 碓 碗 磐 祇 祢 禰 禱 禽 禾 秤 稟 稽 穿 窄 窟 窪 窺 竪 竺 竿 笈 笠 筈 筑 箕 箔 箸 篇 篠 簞 簾 籾 粥 粟 糊 紐 絆 綴 縞 徽 繫 繡 纂 纏 羚 羨 而 耽 肋 肘 肴 脇 腔 腎 膏 膳 臆 臥 臼 舷 舵 芥 芯 芭 芦 苔 苺 茨 茸 荻 莫 菅 萄 菩 萠 萊 菱 葦 葛 萱 葺 董 葡 蓋 蓑 蒐 蒲 蒙 蔭 蔣 蓬 蔓 蕎 蕨 蕃 蕪 蔽 薙 蕾 藁 薩 蘇 蜂 蜜 蝦 螺 蟬 蟹 蠟 袖 袴 裡 裾 裳 襖 訊 訣 註 詣 詮 詫 諏 誰 謂 諺 諦 謎 讃 豹 貌 貰 貼 賑 跨 蹄 蹟 蹴 輯 輿 轟 辻 迂 迄 辿 迦 這 逞 逗 逢 遙 遁 遡 遜 祁 鄭 酎 醐 醒 醍 醬 釉 釘 釜 釧 鋒 鋸 錐 錆 錫 鍋 鍵 鍬 鎧 閃 閏 閤 闇 阜 阪 陀 隈 隙 雀 雁 雫 鞄 鞍 鞘 鞭 韓 頁 頃 頓 頗 頰 顚 餅 饗 馴 馳 驍 魯 鰯 鱒 鱗 鳶 鴨 鵜 鷗 鷲 鷺 麒 麓 鼎 榮 圓 薗 駈 實 嶋 盃 冨 峯 萬 埜 凉 禮
April 30, 2009	1,945	209	756	20	2,930	+2 祷 穹
November 30, 2010	2,136	212	631	18	2,997	jōyō kanji reform removed 5 kanjis, added 191 kanjis (129 of those was from jinmeiyō) +5 removed from jōyō, allocated to jinmeiyō 勺 匁 脹 銑 錘 -129 absorbed into jōyō 串 伎 侶 俺 僅 冥 冶 凄 刹 勃 勾 匂 呂 唄 埼 堆 塞 塡 奈 妖 媛 宛 岡 崖 嵐 巾 弥 憧 戚 戴 拶 拭 挨 拳 捉 捻 斑 旦 旺 昧 曖 曽 枕 柵 柿 栃 桁 梗 梨 椅 椎 汎 沙 汰 湧 煎 熊 爪 爽 牙 玩 瑠 璃 瓦 畏 畿 眉 睦 瞳 瞭 稽 窟 箸 羨 肘 脇 腎 膳 臆 臼 舷 艶 芯 茨 葛 蓋 蔽 藤 藍 虎 虹 蜂 蜜 袖 裾 詣 詮 誰 諦 謎 貌 貼 蹴 遡 遜 那 酎 醒 采 釜 錦 鍋 鍵 鎌 闇 阜 阪 隙 韓 頃 須 頓 頰 餅 駒 鶴 鹿 麓 亀
January 7, 2015	2,136	212	632	18	2,998	+1 巫
September 25, 2017	2,136	212	633	18	2,999	+1 渾
June 26, 2026 (Current state)	2,136	212	634	18	3,000	+1 勒

Below is a list of changes made to the jinmeiyō kanji list since its creation in 1951.

=== May 25, 1951 ===
The first 92 characters of jinmeiyō kanji were published:

丑 丞 乃 之 也 亘 亥 亦 亨 亮 伊 匡 卯 只 吾 哉 嘉 圭 宏 寅 巌 巳 庄 弘 彦 悌 敦 昌 晃 晋 智 暢 朋 桂 桐 楠 橘 欣 欽 毅 浩 淳 爾 猪 玲 琢 瑞 磯 祐 禄 禎 稔 穣 綾 惣 聡 肇 胤 蔦 蘭 蝶 輔 辰 郁 酉 靖 馨 鯉 鯛 麿

This would include seven kanji which would become part of the original jōyō kanji in 1981:

仙 尚 杉 甚 磨 斉 龍

...with the last one 龍 (dragon) also being simplified to 竜 (dragon).

This would also include fifteen kanji which would be transferred to the jōyō kanji in 2010:

呂 奈 弥 熊 睦 艶 藤 虎 錦 鎌 須 駒 鶴 鹿 亀

=== July 30, 1976 ===
28 kanji were added, for a total of 120 characters.

佑 允 冴 喬 怜 旭 杏 梓 梢 梨 沙 渚 瑠 瞳 紗 紘 絢 翠 耶 芙 茜 藍 那 阿 隼 鮎 葵

One would become part of the original jōyō kanji in 1981: 悠.

=== October 1, 1981 ===
The jōyō kanji list was introduced, which included seven of the original 92 jinmeiyō kanji from 1951 (mentioned above), plus one of the 28 new jinmeiyō kanji from 1976 (also mentioned above); those eight were thus removed from the jinmeiyō kanji list. 54 other characters were added for a total of 166 name characters.

伍 伶 侑 尭 孟 峻 嵩 嶺 巴 彬 惇 惟 慧 斐 旦 昂 李 栗 楓 槙 汐 洵 洸 渥 瑛 瑶 璃 甫 皓 眸 矩 碧 笹 緋 翔 脩 苑 茉 莉 萌 萩 蓉 蕗 虹 諒 赳 迪 遥 遼 霞 頌 駿 鳩 鷹

=== March 1, 1990 ===
118 kanji were added for a total of 284 characters.

伎 伽 侃 倖 倭 偲 冶 凌 凜 凪 捺 於 旺 昴 晏 晟 晨 暉 曙 朔 凱 勁 叡 叶 唄 啄 奎 媛 嬉 宥 崚 嵐 嵯 巽 彗 彪 恕 憧 拳 捷 杜 柊 柚 柾 栞 梧 椋 椎 椰 椿 楊 榛 槻 樺 檀 毬 汀 汰 洲 湧 滉 漱 澪 熙 燎 燦 燿 爽 玖 琳 瑚 瑳 皐 眉 瞭 碩 秦 稀 稜 竣 笙 紬 絃 綜 綸 綺 耀 胡 舜 芹 茄 茅 莞 菖 菫 蒔 蒼 蓮 蕉 衿 袈 裟 詢 誼 諄 邑 醇 采 雛 鞠 颯 魁 鳳 鴻 鵬 麟 黎 黛

=== December 3, 1997 ===
1 kanji was added, for a total of 285 characters.

琉

=== February 23, 2004 ===
1 kanji was added, for a total of 286 characters.

曽

=== June 7, 2004 ===
1 kanji was added, for a total of 287 characters.

獅

=== June 11, 2004 ===
No addition to the jinmeiyō kanji was made on this date. However, a plan for 578 additions was put forward to the council on jinmeiyō kanji of the legislative council of the Ministry of Justice. The list included certain characters in strong demand by parents for use in their children's names, such as:

- 苺 (ichigo, "strawberry")
- 遙 (haruka, "distant", traditional variant)
- 煌 (akira, "scintillating")
- 牙 (kiba, "fang")

Many others were included not for their potential uses in names (as is noted), but rather because of their frequent use and being easy to read and write. Examples include:

- 糞 (kuso, "excrement")
- 呪 (noroi, "curse")
- 屍 (shikabane, "corpse")
- 癌 (gan, "cancer")

At this same council, the decision was made to call for suggestions on characters to be included or excluded via the Ministry of Justice website, until July 9, 2004.

=== July 12, 2004 ===
3 kanji were added, for a total of 290 characters.

毘 瀧 駕

=== July 23, 2004 ===
No additions were made. After sharp protests, the council decided to withdraw nine characters from the 489 whose inclusion had been discussed. These nine characters were:

- 糞 (kuso, "excrement")
- 呪 (noroi, "curse")
- 屍 (shikabane, "corpse")
- 癌 (gan, "cancer")
- 姦 (kan, "rape, seduction")
- 淫 (midara, "obscene")
- 怨 (urami, "resentment")
- 痔 (ji, "hemorrhoids")
- 妾 (mekake, "concubine")

The 480 other characters still remained under consideration for inclusion, with one additional character added to them, namely 掬 (kiku, "to draw up water with one's hands").

=== September 27, 2004 ===
488 characters and variant forms of 209 jōyō kanji were added, bringing the total number of the jinmeiyō kanji to 983.

串 乎 云 些 仔 佃 俄 俠 俣 俐 侶 俺 俱 倦 僅 傭 儲 兎 兜 其 冥 凄 凛 凧 凰 函 刹 劉 劫 勃 勾 匂 勿 廿 卜 卿 厨 厩 叉 叢 吞 吻 哨 哩 喧 喰 喋 嘩 嘗 噌 噂 圃 坐 堯 坦 埼 埴 堆 堰 堺 堵 塙 塞 塡 壕 壬 夷 奄 套 妖 娃 姪 姥 娩 宋 宛 宕 寓 寵 尖 尤 屑 岡 峨 崖 已 巷 巾 帖 幌 幡 庇 庚 庵 廟 廻 弛 徠 忽 恢 恰 惚 悉 惹 惺 憐 戊 或 戚 戟 戴 托 按 拶 拭 挨 捉 挺 挽 掬 捲 捻 捧 掠 揃 摑 摺 撒 撰 撞 播 撫 擢 孜 斑 斡 斧 斯 昊 昏 昧 晄 晒 晦 曖 曝 曳 曾 杖 杭 杵 枕 杷 枇 柑 柴 柵 柿 柘 栃 柏 桧 檜 桔 桁 栖 梗 梛 梯 桶 梶 椛 梁 椅 棲 椀 楯 楚 楕 楢 榎 榊 槇 槍 槌 樫 樟 樋 樽 橙 檎 櫂 櫛 櫓 歎 此 殆 汝 汎 汲 沌 沓 沫 洛 浬 淵 淀 淋 湘 湊 湛 溢 溜 漕 漣 濡 瀕 灘 灸 灼 烏 焰 焚 煌 煎 煤 煉 燕 燭 爪 牒 牙 牟 牡 牽 犀 狼 玩 珂 珈 珊 珀 琥 琶 琵 瓜 瓢 瓦 甥 畏 畠 畢 畿 疋 疏 瘦 瞥 砦 砥 砧 硯 碓 碗 磐 祇 祢 禰 禱 禽 禾 秤 稟 稽 穿 窄 窟 窪 窺 竪 竺 竿 笈 笠 筈 筑 箕 箔 箸 篇 篠 簞 簾 籾 粥 粟 糊 紐 絆 綴 縞 徽 繫 繡 纂 纏 羚 羨 而 耽 肋 肘 肴 脇 腔 腎 膏 膳 臆 臥 臼 舷 舵 芥 芯 芭 芦 苔 苺 茨 茸 荻 莫 菅 萄 菩 萠 萊 菱 葦 葛 萱 葺 董 葡 蓋 蓑 蒐 蒲 蒙 蔭 蔣 蓬 蔓 蕎 蕨 蕃 蕪 蔽 薙 蕾 藁 薩 蘇 蜂 蜜 蝦 螺 蟬 蟹 蠟 袖 袴 裡 裾 裳 襖 訊 訣 註 詣 詮 詫 諏 誰 謂 諺 諦 謎 讃 豹 貌 貰 貼 賑 跨 蹄 蹟 蹴 輯 輿 轟 辻 迂 迄 辿 迦 這 逞 逗 逢 遙 遁 遡 遜 祁 鄭 酎 醐 醒 醍 醬 釉 釘 釜 釧 鋒 鋸 錐 錆 錫 鍋 鍵 鍬 鎧 閃 閏 閤 闇 阜 阪 陀 隈 隙 雀 雁 雫 鞄 鞍 鞘 鞭 韓 頁 頃 頓 頗 頰 顚 餅 饗 馴 馳 驍 魯 鰯 鱒 鱗 鳶 鴨 鵜 鷗 鷲 鷺 麒 麓 鼎 榮 圓 薗 駈 實 嶋 盃 冨 峯 萬 埜 凉 禮

=== April 30, 2009 ===
2 more characters were added for a total number of 985 characters.

祷 穹

=== November 30, 2010 ===
In late 2010, the Japanese government added 196 characters to the jōyō kanji list. The list now includes 129 characters previously classified as jinmeiyō kanji, 11 of which are currently used in Japanese prefectures or nearby countries:

- 茨 (ibara in 茨城県, Ibaraki Prefecture)
- 媛 (hime in 愛媛県, Ehime Prefecture)
- 岡 (oka in 静岡県, Shizuoka Prefecture)
- 韓 (kan in 韓国, South Korea)
- 熊 (kuma in 熊本県, Kumamoto Prefecture)
- 埼 (sai or saki) in 埼玉県, Saitama Prefecture)
- 栃 (tochi in 栃木県, Tochigi Prefecture)
- 奈 (na in 奈良県, Nara Prefecture)
- 梨 (nashi in 山梨県, Yamanashi Prefecture)
- 阪 (saka in 大阪, Osaka)
- 阜 (fu in 岐阜県, Gifu Prefecture)

At the same time, 5 characters deleted from the jōyō kanji list were added to the jinmeiyō kanji list, making the total number of jinmeiyō kanji 861:

- 勺 (shaku (しゃく), an old unit of measure approx. 18ml in volume, or 0.033m^{2} in area)
- 錘 (sui (すい) or tsumu (つむ), a spindle or weight)
- 銑 (sen (せん), pig iron)
- 脹 (chō (ちょう) or fuku[reru] (ふく[れる]), to swell or bulge; mostly used in the compound 膨脹, normally rewritten with 張 instead)
- 匁 (monme (もんめ), a unit of weight approx 3.75g)

=== January 7, 2015 ===
1 kanji was added, for a total of 862 characters.

- 巫 (kannagi (かんなぎ), spiritual medium, oracle, shaman, shrine maiden)

=== September 25, 2017 ===
1 kanji was added, for a total of 863 characters.

渾

=== June 26, 2026 ===
1 kanji was added, for a total of 864 characters.

勒

== List of jinmeiyō kanji ==
The list is split into two parts:

- 634 characters which do not appear in the list of jōyō kanji (regular-use kanji). 18 of these have a variant, bringing the number of character forms to 652.
- 212 characters which are traditional forms (kyūjitai) of characters present in the list of jōyō kanji.

=== Jinmeiyō kanji not part of the jōyō kanji ===
Variants are given in parentheses.

丑 丞 乃 之 乎 也 云 亘（亙）些 亦 亥 亨 亮 仔 伊 伍 伽 佃 佑 伶 侃 侑 俄 俠 俣 俐 倭 俱 倦 倖 偲 傭 儲 允 兎 兜 其 冴 凌 凜（凛）凧 凪 凰 凱 函 劉 劫 勁 勺 勿 匁 匡 廿 卜 卯 卿 厨 厩 叉 叡 叢 叶 只 吾 吞 吻 哉 哨 啄 哩 喬 喧 喰 喋 嘩 嘉 嘗 噌 噂 圃 圭 坐 尭（堯）坦 埴 堰 堺 堵 塙 壕 壬 夷 奄 奎 套 娃 姪 姥 娩 嬉 孟 宏 宋 宕 宥 寅 寓 寵 尖 尤 屑 峨 峻 崚 嵯 嵩 嶺 巌（巖）巫 已 巳 巴 巷 巽 帖 幌 幡 庄 庇 庚 庵 廟 廻 弘 弛 彗 彦 彪 彬 徠 忽 怜 恢 恰 恕 悌 惟 惚 悉 惇 惹 惺 惣 慧 憐 戊 或 戟 托 按 挺 挽 掬 捲 捷 捺 捧 掠 揃 摑 摺 撒 撰 撞 播 撫 擢 孜 敦 斐 斡 斧 斯 於 旭 昂 昊 昏 昌 昴 晏 晃（晄）晒 晋 晟 晦 晨 智 暉 暢 曙 曝 曳 朋 朔 杏 杖 杜 李 杭 杵 杷 枇 柑 柴 柘 柊 柏 柾 柚 桧（檜）栞 桔 桂 栖 桐 栗 梧 梓 梢 梛 梯 桶 梶 椛 梁 棲 椋 椀 楯 楚 楕 椿 楠 楓 椰 楢 楊 榎 樺 榊 榛 槙（槇）槍 槌 樫 槻 樟 樋 橘 樽 橙 檎 檀 櫂 櫛 櫓 欣 欽 歎 此 殆 毅 毘 毬 汀 汝 汐 汲 沌 沓 沫 洸 洲 洵 洛 浩 浬 淵 淳 渚（渚︀）淀 淋 渥 渾 湘 湊 湛 溢 滉 溜 漱 漕 漣 澪 濡 瀕 灘 灸 灼 烏 焰 焚 煌 煤 煉 熙 燕 燎 燦 燭 燿 爾 牒 牟 牡 牽 犀 狼 猪（猪︀）獅 玖 珂 珈 珊 珀 玲 琢（琢︀）琉 瑛 琥 琶 琵 琳 瑚 瑞 瑶 瑳 瓜 瓢 甥 甫 畠 畢 疋 疏 皐 皓 眸 瞥 矩 砦 砥 砧 硯 碓 碗 碩 碧 磐 磯 祇 祢（禰）祐（祐︀）祷（禱）禄（祿）禎（禎︀）禽 禾 秦 秤 稀 稔 稟 稜 穣（穰）穹 穿 窄 窪 窺 竣 竪 竺 竿 笈 笹 笙 笠 筈 筑 箕 箔 篇 篠 簞 簾 籾 粥 粟 糊 紘 紗 紐 絃 紬 絆 絢 綺 綜 綴 緋 綾 綸 縞 徽 繫 繡 纂 纏 羚 翔 翠 耀 而 耶 耽 聡 肇 肋 肴 胤 胡 脩 腔 脹 膏 臥 舜 舵 芥 芹 芭 芙 芦 苑 茄 苔 苺 茅 茉 茸 茜 莞 荻 莫 莉 菅 菫 菖 萄 菩 萌（萠）萊 菱 葦 葵 萱 葺 萩 董 葡 蓑 蒔 蒐 蒼 蒲 蒙 蓉 蓮 蔭 蔣 蔦 蓬 蔓 蕎 蕨 蕉 蕃 蕪 薙 蕾 蕗 藁 薩 蘇 蘭 蝦 蝶 螺 蟬 蟹 蠟 衿 袈 袴 裡 裟 裳 襖 訊 訣 註 詢 詫 誼 諏 諄 諒 謂 諺 讃 豹 貰 賑 赳 跨 蹄 蹟 輔 輯 輿 轟 辰 辻 迂 迄 辿 迪 迦 這 逞 逗 逢 遥（遙）遁 遼 邑 祁 郁 鄭 酉 醇 醐 醍 醬 釉 釘 釧 銑 鋒 鋸 錘 錐 錆 錫 鍬 鎧 閃 閏 閤 阿 陀 隈 隼 雀 雁 雛 雫 霞 靖 鞄 鞍 鞘 鞠 鞭 頁 頌 頗 顚 颯 饗 馨 馴 馳 駕 駿 驍 魁 魯 鮎 鯉 鯛 鰯 鱒 鱗 鳩 鳶 鳳 鴨 鴻 鵜 鵬 鷗 鷲 鷺 鷹 麒 麟 麿 黎 黛 鼎 勒

Below are the 18 characters that are variant forms of characters in the list above. For each variant form, the corresponding standard form ("non-variant" form) is in parentheses.

亙（亘） 凛（凜） 堯（尭） 巖（巌） 晄（晃） 檜（桧） 槇（槙） 渚︀（渚） 猪︀（猪） 琢︀（琢） 禰（祢） 祐︀（祐） 禱（祷） 祿（禄） 禎︀（禎） 穰（穣） 萠（萌） 遙（遥）

=== Traditional variants of jōyō kanji ===
The modern form (shinjitai), which appears in the jōyō kanji list, is given in brackets.

亞（亜） 惡（悪） 爲（為） 逸︁（逸） 榮（栄） 衞（衛） 謁︀（謁） 圓（円） 緣（縁） 薗（園） 應（応） 櫻（桜） 奧（奥） 橫（横） 溫（温） 價（価） 禍︀（禍） 悔︀（悔） 海︀（海） 壞（壊） 懷（懐） 樂（楽） 渴（渇） 卷（巻） 陷（陥） 寬（寛） 漢︀（漢） 氣（気） 祈︀（祈） 器︀（器） 僞（偽） 戲（戯） 虛（虚） 峽（峡） 狹（狭） 響︀（響） 曉（暁） 勤︀（勤） 謹︀（謹） 駈（駆） 勳（勲） 薰（薫） 惠（恵） 揭（掲） 鷄（鶏） 藝（芸） 擊（撃） 縣（県） 儉（倹） 劍（剣） 險（険） 圈（圏） 檢（検） 顯（顕） 驗（験） 嚴（厳） 廣（広） 恆（恒） 黃（黄） 國（国） 黑（黒） 穀︀（穀） 碎（砕） 雜（雑） 祉︀（祉） 視︀（視） 兒（児） 濕（湿） 實（実） 社︀（社） 者︀（者） 煮︀（煮） 壽（寿） 收（収） 臭︀（臭） 從（従） 澁（渋） 獸（獣） 縱（縦） 祝︀（祝） 暑︀（暑） 署︀（署） 緖（緒） 諸︀（諸） 敍（叙） 將（将） 祥︀（祥） 涉（渉） 燒（焼） 奬（奨） 條（条） 狀（状） 乘（乗） 淨（浄） 剩（剰） 疊（畳） 孃（嬢） 讓（譲） 釀（醸） 神︀（神） 眞（真） 寢（寝） 愼（慎） 盡（尽） 粹（粋） 醉（酔） 穗（穂） 瀨（瀬） 齊（斉） 靜（静） 攝（摂） 節︀（節） 專（専） 戰（戦） 纖（繊） 禪（禅） 祖︀（祖） 壯（壮） 爭（争） 莊（荘） 搜（捜） 巢（巣） 曾（曽） 裝（装） 僧︀（僧） 層︀（層） 瘦（痩） 騷（騒） 增（増） 憎︀（憎） 藏（蔵） 贈︀（贈） 臟（臓） 卽（即） 帶（帯） 滯（滞） 瀧（滝） 單（単） 嘆︀（嘆） 團（団） 彈（弾） 晝（昼） 鑄（鋳） 著︀（著） 廳（庁） 徵（徴） 聽（聴） 懲︀（懲） 鎭（鎮） 轉（転） 傳（伝） 都︀（都） 嶋（島） 燈（灯） 盜（盗） 稻（稲） 德（徳） 突︀（突） 難︀（難） 拜（拝） 盃（杯） 賣（売） 梅︀（梅） 髮（髪） 拔（抜） 繁︀（繁） 晚（晩） 卑︀（卑） 祕（秘） 碑︀（碑） 賓︀（賓） 敏︀（敏） 冨（富） 侮︀（侮） 福︀（福） 拂（払） 佛（仏） 勉︀（勉） 步（歩） 峯（峰） 墨︀（墨） 飜（翻） 每（毎） 萬（万） 默（黙） 埜（野） 彌（弥） 藥（薬） 與（与） 搖（揺） 樣（様） 謠（謡） 來（来） 賴（頼） 覽（覧） 欄︀（欄） 龍󠄂（竜） 虜︀（虜） 凉（涼） 綠（緑） 淚（涙） 壘（塁） 類︀（類） 禮（礼） 曆（暦） 歷（歴） 練︁（練） 鍊（錬） 郞（郎） 朗︀（朗） 廊︀（廊） 錄（録）

=== Actual usage in names ===
Usage of the jinmeiyō kanji in Japanese names varies widely. For example, 之, is used in over 6,000 names, and the 53 kanji used most commonly in names are all in over 500 names each.

== See also ==
- Inmyongyong chuga hanjapyo (Korean names)
