= Kyūjitai =

Old forms of kanji

Japanese name
- Hiragana: きゅうじたい
- Kyūjitai: 舊字體
- Shinjitai: 旧字体
Transcriptions
- Revised Hepburn: Kyūjitai
- Kunrei-shiki: Kyûzitai

Kyūjitai (Japanese: 舊字體 / 旧字体, lit. 'old character forms') are the traditional forms of kanji (Chinese written characters used in Japanese writing). Their simplified counterparts are shinjitai (新字體 / 新字体, 'new character forms'). Some of the simplified characters arose centuries ago and were in everyday use in both China and Japan, but they were considered inelegant, even uncouth. After World War II, simplified character forms were made official separately in Japan and mainland China, with Japan adopting fewer and less drastic changes. For example, 電 (den) remains unchanged, whereas it was simplified to 电 (diàn) in China.

Prior to the promulgation of the tōyō kanji list in 1946, kyūjitai were known as seiji (正字, 'proper/correct characters') or seijitai (正字體). Even after kyūjitai were officially marked for discontinuation with the promulgation of the tōyō kanji list, they were used in print frequently into the 1950s due to logistical delays in changing over typesetting equipment. Kyūjitai continue in use to the present day because when the Japanese government adopted the simplified forms, it did not ban the traditional forms. Thus, traditional forms are used when an author wishes to use them and the publisher agrees.

Unlike in the People's Republic of China, where all personal names were simplified as part of the character simplification reform carried out in the 1950s, the Japanese reform applied only to a subset of the characters in use (the tōyō kanji) and excluded characters used in proper names. Therefore, kyūjitai are still used in personal names in Japan today (see jinmeiyō kanji). In modern Japanese, kyūjitai that appear in the official spelling of proper names are sometimes replaced with the modern shinjitai form.

== Jōyō kanji ==
In the 2,136 Jōyō Kanji (常用漢字), there are 364 pairs of simplified and traditional characters (for example, 亜 is the simplified form of 亞). The kanji 弁 is used to simplify three different traditional kanji (辨, 瓣, and 辯).

=== Traditional characters that may not be displayed correctly ===
Within the jōyō kanji, there are 62 characters the old forms of which may not be displayed correctly:

Kyōiku kanji (26):

- Grade 2 (2 kanji): 海 社
- Grade 3 (8 kanji): 勉 暑 漢 神 福 練 者 都
- Grade 4 (6 kanji): 器 殺 祝 節 梅 類
- Grade 5 (1 kanji): 祖
- Grade 6 (9 kanji): 勤 穀 視 署 層 著 諸 難 朗

Secondary-school kanji (36):

- Secondary school (36 kanji): 欄 廊 虜 隆 塚 祥 侮 僧 免 卑 喝 嘆 塀 墨 悔 慨 憎 懲 敏 既 煮 碑 祉 祈 禍 突 繁 臭 褐 謁 謹 賓 贈 逸 響 頻

These characters are Unicode CJK Unified Ideographs for which the old form (kyūjitai) and the new form (shinjitai) have been unified under the Unicode standard. Although the old and new forms are distinguished under the JIS X 0213 standard, the old forms map to Unicode CJK Compatibility Ideographs which are considered by Unicode to be canonically equivalent to the new forms and may not be distinguished by user agents. Therefore, depending on the user environment, it may not be possible to see the distinction between old and new forms of the characters. In particular, all Unicode normalization methods merge the old characters with the new ones.

=== List of the simplified jōyō kanji and their traditional forms ===
In the revised version of jōyō kanji, 5 kanji were removed (but preserved as jinmeiyō kanji), and 196 more kanji were added into Jōyō Kanjihyō of originally 1945 kanji; 6 of these new kanji have a traditional and a simplified form. They are underlined in the following list.

亜（亞） 悪（惡） 圧（壓） 囲（圍） 医（醫） 為（爲） 壱（壹） 逸（逸︁） 隠（隱） 栄（榮） 営（營） 衛（衞） 駅（驛） 謁（謁︀） 円（圓） 塩（鹽） 縁（緣） 艶（艷） 応（應） 欧（歐） 殴（毆） 桜（櫻） 奥（奧） 横（橫） 温（溫） 穏（穩） 仮（假） 価（價） 禍（禍︀） 画（畫） 会（會） 悔（悔︀） 海（海︀） 絵（繪） 壊（壞） 懐（懷） 慨（慨︀） 概（槪） 拡（擴） 殻（殼） 覚（覺） 学（學） 岳（嶽） 楽（樂） 喝（喝︀） 渇（渴） 褐（褐︀） 缶（罐） 巻（卷） 陥（陷） 勧（勸） 寛（寬） 漢（漢︀） 関（關） 歓（歡） 観（觀） 気（氣） 祈（祈︀） 既（既︀） 帰（歸） 器（器︀） 亀（龜） 偽（僞） 戯（戲） 犠（犧） 旧（舊） 拠（據） 挙（擧） 虚（虛） 峡（峽） 挟（挾） 狭（狹） 郷（鄕） 響（響︀） 暁（曉） 勤（勤︀） 謹（謹︀） 区（區） 駆（驅） 勲（勳） 薫（薰） 径（徑） 茎（莖） 恵（惠） 掲（揭） 渓（溪） 経（經） 蛍（螢） 軽（輕） 継（繼） 鶏（鷄） 芸（藝） 撃（擊） 欠（缺） 研（硏） 県（縣） 倹（儉） 剣（劍） 険（險） 圏（圈） 検（檢） 献（獻） 権（權） 顕（顯） 験（驗） 厳（嚴） 広（廣） 効（效） 恒（恆） 黄（黃） 鉱（鑛） 号（號） 国（國） 黒（黑） 穀（穀︀） 砕（碎） 済（濟） 斎（齋） 剤（劑） 殺（殺︀） 雑（雜） 参（參） 桟（棧） 蚕（蠶） 惨（慘） 賛（贊） 残（殘） 糸（絲） 祉（祉︀） 視（視︀） 歯（齒） 児（兒） 辞（辭） 湿（濕） 実（實） 写（寫） 社（社︀） 者（者︀） 煮（煮︀） 釈（釋） 寿（壽） 収（收） 臭（臭︀） 従（從） 渋（澁） 獣（獸） 縦（縱） 祝（祝︀） 粛（肅） 処（處） 暑（暑︀） 署（署︀） 緒（緖） 諸（諸︀） 叙（敍） 将（將） 祥（祥︀） 称（稱） 渉（涉） 焼（燒） 証（證） 奨（獎） 条（條） 状（狀） 乗（乘） 浄（淨） 剰（剩） 畳（疊） 縄（繩） 壌（壤） 嬢（孃） 譲（讓） 醸（釀） 触（觸） 嘱（囑） 神（神︀） 真（眞） 寝（寢） 慎（愼） 尽（盡） 図（圖） 粋（粹） 酔（醉） 穂（穗） 随（隨） 髄（髓） 枢（樞） 数（數） 瀬（瀨） 声（聲） 斉（齊） 静（靜） 窃（竊） 摂（攝） 節（節︀） 専（專） 浅（淺） 戦（戰） 践（踐） 銭（錢） 潜（潛） 繊（纖） 禅（禪） 祖（祖︀） 双（雙） 壮（壯） 争（爭） 荘（莊） 捜（搜） 挿（插） 巣（巢） 曽（曾） 痩（瘦） 装（裝） 僧（僧︀） 層（層︀） 総（總） 騒（騷） 増（增） 憎（憎︀） 蔵（藏） 贈（贈︀） 臓（臟） 即（卽） 属（屬） 続（續） 堕（墮） 対（對） 体（體） 帯（帶） 滞（滯） 台（臺） 滝（瀧） 択（擇） 沢（澤） 担（擔） 単（單） 胆（膽） 嘆（嘆︀） 団（團） 断（斷） 弾（彈） 遅（遲） 痴（癡） 虫（蟲） 昼（晝） 鋳（鑄） 著（著︀） 庁（廳） 徴（徵） 聴（聽） 懲（懲︀） 勅（敕） 鎮（鎭） 塚（塚︀） 逓（遞） 鉄（鐵） 点（點） 転（轉） 伝（傳） 都（都︀） 灯（燈） 当（當） 党（黨） 盗（盜） 稲（稻） 闘（鬪） 徳（德） 独（獨） 読（讀） 突（突︀） 届（屆） 難（難︀） 弐（貳） 悩（惱） 脳（腦） 覇（霸） 拝（拜） 廃（廢） 売（賣） 梅（梅︀） 麦（麥） 発（發） 髪（髮） 抜（拔） 繁（繁︀） 晩（晚） 蛮（蠻） 卑（卑︀） 秘（祕） 碑（碑︀） 浜（濱） 賓（賓︀） 頻（頻︀） 敏（敏︀） 瓶（甁） 侮（侮︀） 福（福︀） 払（拂） 仏（佛） 併（倂） 並（竝） 塀（塀︀） 餅（餠） 辺（邊） 変（變） 勉（勉︀） 歩（步） 宝（寶） 豊（豐） 褒（襃） 墨（墨︀） 翻（飜） 毎（每） 万（萬） 満（滿） 免（免︀） 麺（麵） 黙（默） 弥（彌） 訳（譯） 薬（藥） 与（與） 予（豫） 余（餘） 誉（譽） 揺（搖） 様（樣） 謡（謠） 来（來） 頼（賴） 乱（亂） 覧（覽） 欄（欄︀） 竜（龍） 隆（隆︀） 虜（虜︀） 両（兩） 猟（獵） 緑（綠） 涙（淚） 塁（壘） 類（類︀） 礼（禮） 励（勵） 戻（戾） 霊（靈） 齢（齡） 暦（曆） 歴（歷） 恋（戀） 練（練︁） 錬（鍊） 炉（爐） 労（勞） 郎（郞） 朗（朗︀） 廊（廊︀） 楼（樓） 録（錄） 湾（灣） 弁（辨/瓣/辯）

== Jinmeiyō Kanji ==
=== Kyūjitai vs. Shinjitai ===
The Jinmeiyō Kanji List contains 212 traditional characters still used in names. The modern form (shinjitai), which appears in the Jōyō Kanji List, is given in parentheses.

亞（亜） 惡（悪） 爲（為） 逸︁（逸） 榮（栄） 衞（衛） 謁︀（謁） 圓（円） 緣（縁） 薗（園） 應（応） 櫻（桜） 奧（奥） 橫（横） 溫（温） 價（価） 禍︀（禍） 悔︀（悔） 海︀（海） 壞（壊） 懷（懐） 樂（楽） 渴（渇） 卷（巻） 陷（陥） 寬（寛） 漢︀（漢） 氣（気） 祈︀（祈） 器︀（器） 僞（偽） 戲（戯） 虛（虚） 峽（峡） 狹（狭） 響︀（響） 曉（暁） 勤︀（勤） 謹︀（謹） 駈（駆） 勳（勲） 薰（薫） 惠（恵） 揭（掲） 鷄（鶏） 藝（芸） 擊（撃） 縣（県） 儉（倹） 劍（剣） 險（険） 圈（圏） 檢（検） 顯（顕） 驗（験） 嚴（厳） 廣（広） 恆（恒） 黃（黄） 國（国） 黑（黒） 穀︀（穀） 碎（砕） 雜（雑） 祉︀（祉） 視︀（視） 兒（児） 濕（湿） 實（実） 社︀（社） 者︀（者） 煮︀（煮） 壽（寿） 收（収） 臭︀（臭） 從（従） 澁（渋） 獸（獣） 縱（縦） 祝︀（祝） 暑︀（暑） 署︀（署） 緖（緒） 諸︀（諸） 敍（叙） 將（将） 祥︀（祥） 涉（渉） 燒（焼） 奬（奨） 條（条） 狀（状） 乘（乗） 淨（浄） 剩（剰） 疊（畳） 孃（嬢） 讓（譲） 釀（醸） 神︀（神） 眞（真） 寢（寝） 愼（慎） 盡（尽） 粹（粋） 醉（酔） 穗（穂） 瀨（瀬） 齊（斉） 靜（静） 攝（摂） 節︀（節） 專（専） 戰（戦） 纖（繊） 禪（禅） 祖︀（祖） 壯（壮） 爭（争） 莊（荘） 搜（捜） 巢（巣） 曾（曽） 裝（装） 僧︀（僧） 層︀（層） 瘦（痩） 騷（騒） 增（増） 憎︀（憎） 藏（蔵） 贈︀（贈） 臟（臓） 卽（即） 帶（帯） 滯（滞） 瀧（滝） 單（単） 嘆︀（嘆） 團（団） 彈（弾） 晝（昼） 鑄（鋳） 著︀（著） 廳（庁） 徵（徴） 聽（聴） 懲︀（懲） 鎭（鎮） 轉（転） 傳（伝） 都︀（都） 嶋（島） 燈（灯） 盜（盗） 稻（稲） 德（徳） 突︀（突） 難︀（難） 拜（拝） 盃（杯） 賣（売） 梅︀（梅） 髮（髪） 拔（抜） 繁︀（繁） 晚（晩） 卑︀（卑） 祕（秘） 碑︀（碑） 賓︀（賓） 敏︀（敏） 冨（富） 侮︀（侮） 福︀（福） 拂（払） 佛（仏） 勉︀（勉） 步（歩） 峯（峰） 墨︀（墨） 飜（翻） 每（毎） 萬（万） 默（黙） 埜（野） 彌（弥） 藥（薬） 與（与） 搖（揺） 樣（様） 謠（謡） 來（来） 賴（頼） 覽（覧） 欄︀（欄） 龍（竜） 虜︀（虜） 凉（涼） 綠（緑） 淚（涙） 壘（塁） 類︀（類） 禮（礼） 曆（暦） 歷（歴） 練︁（練） 鍊（錬） 郞（郎） 朗︀（朗） 廊︀（廊） 錄（録）

=== Variants ===
The Jinmeiyō Kanji List also contains 631 additional kanji that are not elements of the Jōyō Kanji List; 18 of them have a variant:

亘（亙） 凜（凛） 尭（堯） 巌（巖） 晃（晄） 桧（檜） 槙（槇） 渚（渚︀） 猪（猪︀） 琢（琢︀） 祢（禰） 祐（祐︀） 祷（禱） 禄（祿） 禎（禎︀） 穣（穰） 萌（萠） 遥（遙）

=== Former jōyō kanji still used as jinmeiyō kanji ===
The following 5 kanji were removed from the Jōyō Kanji List in 2010, but were preserved as jinmeiyō kanji. They have no simplified form.

勺 銑 脹 錘 匁

勺 and 匁 are kokuji.

=== Jinmeiyō kanji used as jōyō kanji since 2010 ===
Of the 196 new jōyō kanji, 129 were already on the Jinmeiyō Kanji List; 10 of them are used in names of Japanese prefectures, and the kanji 韓 that appears in the name of South Korea (韓国 Kankoku). Four of these kanji have both a simplified and a traditional form:

艶（艷） 曽（曾） 痩（瘦） 弥（彌）

== Hyōgai kanji ==
Hyōgai kanji are kanji that are elements of neither the Jōyō Kanji List nor the Jinmeiyō Kanji List. In Hyōgai Kanji Jitaihyō (表外漢字字体表), traditional characters are recognized as printed standard style (印刷標準字体) while the simplified characters are recognized as simple conventional style (簡易慣用字体). Here are some examples of hyōgai kanji that have a simplified and a traditional form:

唖（啞） 頴（穎） 鴎（鷗） 躯（軀） 撹（攪） 麹（麴） 鹸（鹼） 噛（嚙） 繍（繡） 蒋（蔣） 醤（醬） 掻（搔） 屏（屛） 并（幷） 沪（濾） 芦（蘆） 蝋（蠟） 弯（彎） 焔（焰） 砿（礦） 讃（讚） 顛（顚） 醗（醱） 溌（潑） 輌（輛） 繋（繫）

=== Former Hyōgai Kanji used as Jōyō Kanji since 2010 ===
In 2010, 67 hyōgai kanji were added to the Jōyō Kanji List; 2 of them have a traditional and a simplified form:

餅（餠） 麺（麵）

== Kokuji ==
Kokuji are characters that were created in Japan and were not taken over from China. Some of them, e.g. 腺, are now also used in Chinese, but most of them are not.

=== Kokuji used as Jōyō Kanji or Jinmeiyō Kanji (as of 2010) ===
The Jōyō Kanji List currently contains 9 kokuji (働 and 畑 are kyōiku kanji):

働 匂 塀 峠 腺 枠 栃 畑 込

匁 was removed from the Jōyō Kanji List in 2010, but is still used as jinmeiyō kanji.

The Jinmeiyō Kanji List currently contains 16 kokuji:

匁 俣 凧 凪 喰 柾 椛 榊 樫 畠 笹 籾 辻 雫 鰯 麿

== See also ==
- Traditional Chinese characters
