= East Asian Gothic typeface =

Font design for CJK characters

A passage from the Thousand Character Classic in sans-serif typeface. The rightmost line is the original Chinese. The middle and the left lines are transliterations in Japanese kana and Korean Hangul, respectively.

In East Asian typography, gothic typefaces or "black script" (simplified Chinese: 黑体; traditional Chinese: 黑體; pinyin: hēitǐ; Jyutping: haak1 tai2; Japanese: ゴシック体, romanized: goshikku-tai; Korean: 돋움, romanized: dodum, 고딕체 godik-che) are a style of typeface/font characterized by even thickness of strokes and lack of serif decorations, akin to sans serif styles in Western (Latin and Cyrillic) typography. The most prominent example of East Asian gothic typefaces is the one used for printing the Chinese family of scripts, which include Chinese characters and their borrowed relatives such as kanji, hanja and the radical-derived katakana. It is one of the four most commonly seen typeface styles used in modern written Chinese (along with the Song, Fangsong and regular typefaces) and is the standard Guobiao typeface used on road signs in China.

== History ==
Starting in the 1960s, the People's Republic of China's Shanghai Printing Technology and Research Institute developed new typefaces for Simplified Chinese, including gothic typefaces. The communist government favored gothic typefaces because they were plain and "represented a break with the past."

== Characteristics ==
Similar to Ming and Song typefaces, sans-serif typefaces were designed for printing, but they were also designed for legibility. They are commonly used in headlines, signs, and video applications.

=== Classifications ===
Round sans style typeface

- Square sans (Japanese: 角ゴシック kaku goshikku; simplified Chinese: 方体; traditional Chinese: 方體; pinyin: fāngtǐ; Jyutping: fong1 tai2), the classic sans-serif style in which the lines of the characters have squared ends.
  - Overlapping square sans (simplified Chinese: 叠黑体; traditional Chinese: 疊黑體; pinyin: diéhēitǐ; Jyutping: dip6 haak1 tai2) - This style is similar to the square sans, but in places where strokes overlap, a margin is inserted between the strokes to distinguish the strokes.
  - Square new book (simplified Chinese: 方新书体; traditional Chinese: 方新書體; pinyin: fāngxīn shūtǐ; Jyutping: fong1san1 syu1tai2) - Uses narrow horizontal and thick vertical strokes, similar to typefaces such as Optima.
- Round sans (Japanese: 丸ゴシック maru goshikku, simplified Chinese: 圆体/黑圆体; traditional Chinese: 圓體/黑圓體; pinyin: yuántǐ/hēiyuántǐ; Jyutping: jyun4tai2/haak1jyun4tai2, Korean:굴림체 gullimche), has rounded ends and corners to the lines of the characters. In some cases, short protruding stroke ends at intersections are eliminated to make glyphs look rounder. This is the style of typeface used for Japanese road signs.
  - Overlapping round sans (simplified Chinese: 叠圆体; traditional Chinese: 疊圓體; pinyin: diéyuántǐ; Jyutping: dip6 jyun4 tai2) - This is similar to the round sans, but in places where strokes overlap, a margin is inserted between the strokes to distinguish the strokes.
  - Rounded new book (simplified Chinese: 圆新书体; traditional Chinese: 圓新書體; pinyin: yuánxīn shūtǐ; Jyutping: jyun4san1 syu1tai2) - Uses narrow horizontal and thick vertical strokes, along with rounded line ends and corners.
- Mixed art (simplified Chinese: 综艺体; traditional Chinese: 綜藝體; pinyin: zōngyìtǐ; Jyutping: zung1 ngai6 tai2) - Curved strokes are replaced by angled strokes with sharp or round corners.

== Sans-serif typefaces in computing ==
Sans serif typefaces, especially for default system fonts, are common in Japanese computing. Also, many Korean computing environments use Gulim which includes soft curves but is a sans-serif typeface.

In Chinese, versions of Microsoft Windows XP and older, the default interface typefaces have serifs (MingLiU and SimSun), which deviates from the sans serif styling use in most other (including East Asian) regions of the product. Starting in Windows Vista, the default interface typefaces in all regions were changed to sans-serif styles, using Microsoft JhengHei in Traditional Chinese environments and Microsoft YaHei in Simplified Chinese environments.

== See also ==
- East Asian typography
- Songti script
