= East Asian typography =

Typesetting of Chinese characters

East Asian typography is the application of typography to the writing systems used for the Chinese, Japanese, Korean, and Vietnamese languages. Scripts represented in East Asian typography include Chinese characters, kana, and hangul.

== History ==
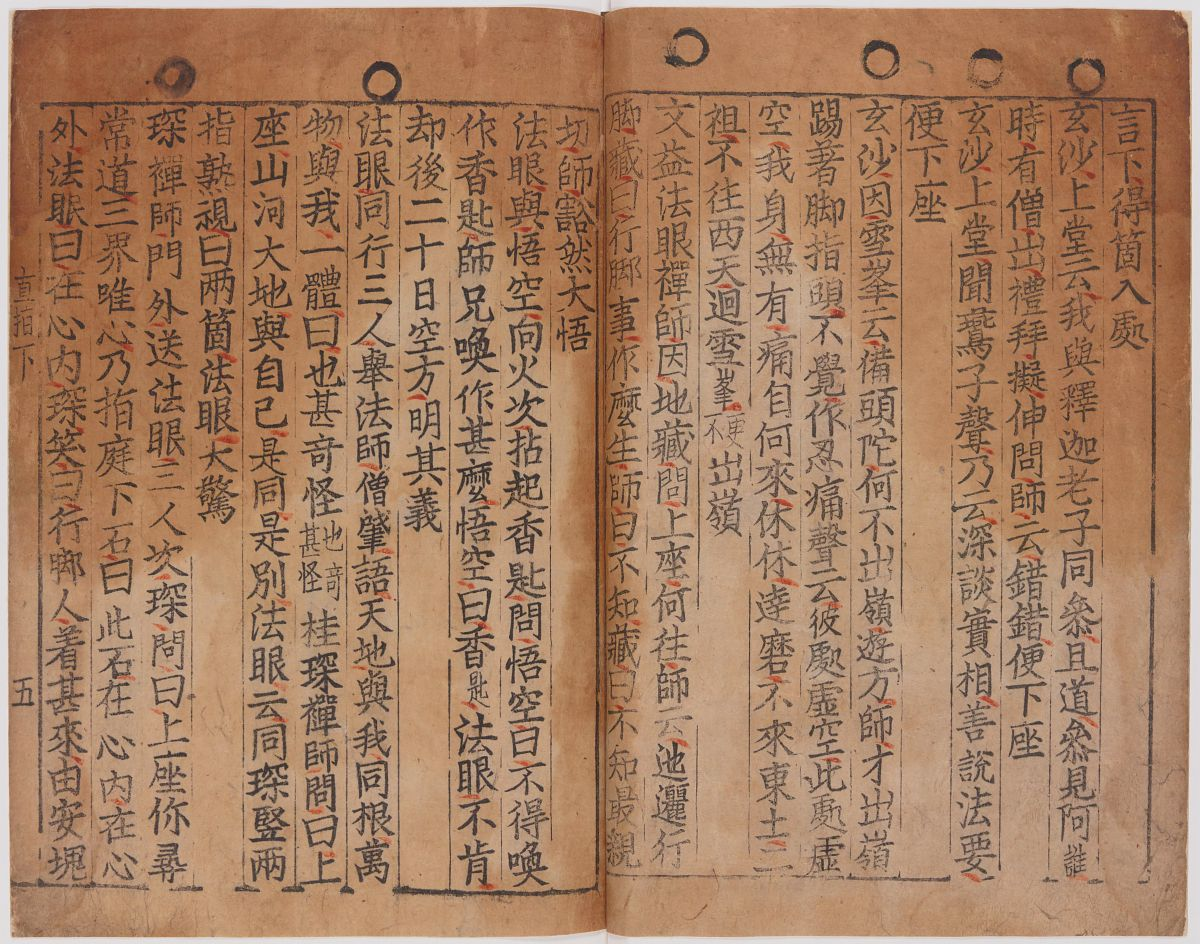
The Jikji (1377), the earliest known book printed using movable metal type – Bibliothèque nationale de France

Typesetting with movable type was invented in China during the Song dynasty by Bi Sheng (990–1051). His system used ceramic materials; clay type printing continued to be practiced in China until the Qing dynasty (1644–1912). Wang Zhen (1290–1333) was one of the pioneers of wood type. Although the wooden type was more durable under the mechanical rigors of handling, repeated printing wore the character faces down and the types could be replaced only by carving new pieces.

Metal movable type was first invented in Korea c. 1230 during the Goryeo period (918–1392). Hua Sui (1439–1513) introduced bronze type printing to China in 1490. The diffusion of both movable-type systems was limited and the technology did not spread beyond East and Central Asia, however.

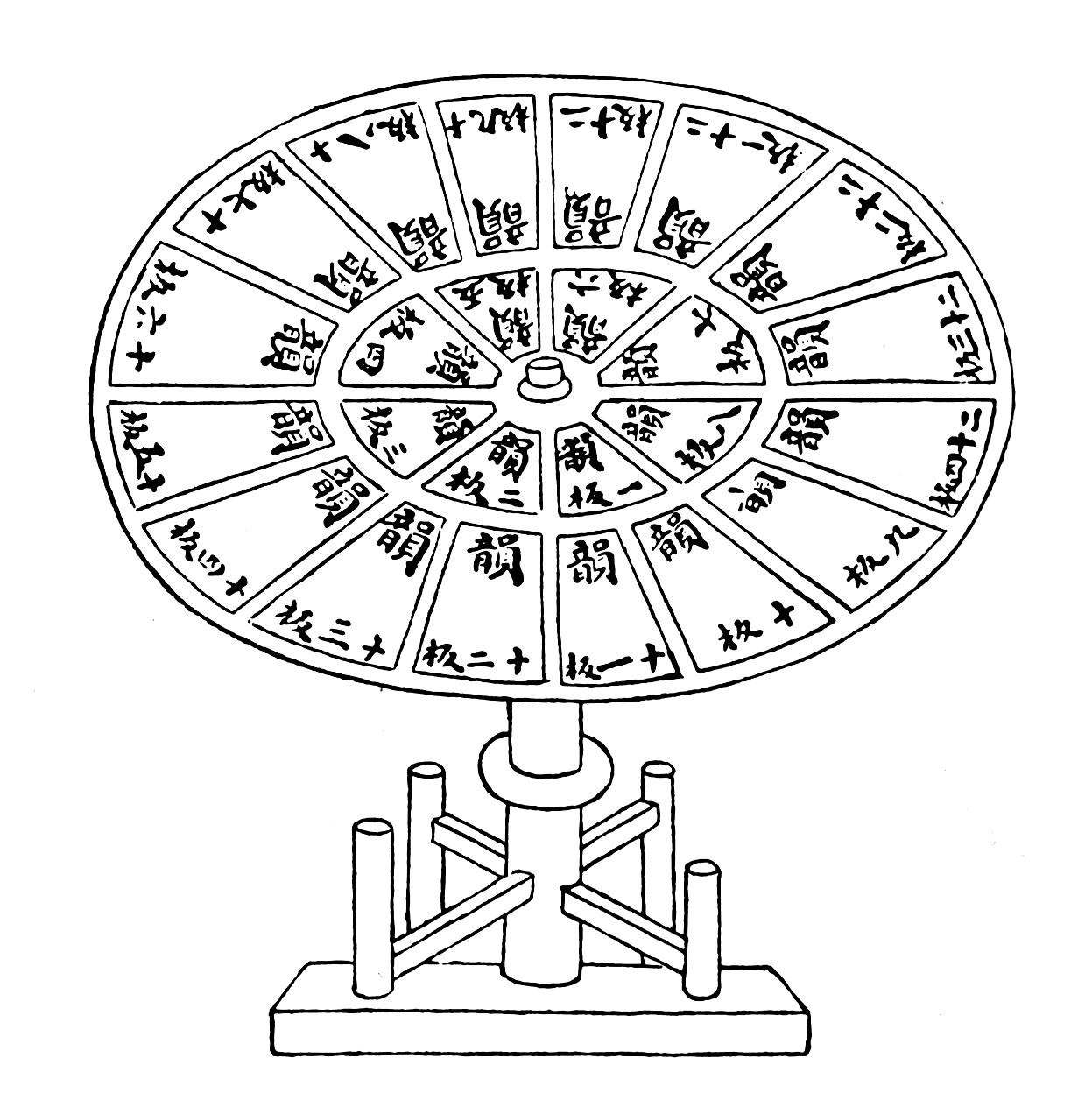
A revolving type case for wooden type in China, an illustration shown in a book published in 1313 by Wang Zhen

Before the 19th century, woodblock printing was favored over movable type to print East Asian text, because movable type required reusable types for thousands of Chinese characters. During the Ming dynasty, Ming typefaces were developed with straight and angular strokes, which made them easier to carve from woodblocks than calligraphic forms such as regular script.

Movable type for Chinese characters was popularized in the mid-19th century by American missionary William Gamble, who led the American Presbyterian Mission Press (APMP) in Ningbo and Shanghai from 1858 to 1869. Gamble developed an electrotyping process to reproduce Chinese character types. This method produced characters that were clearer and more closely resembled calligraphic glyphs, and it allowed the types to be made in smaller sizes without reducing quality. In 1869, on his way back to the United States, Gamble stopped over in Japan, where he introduced the electrotype method to Motogi Shōzō. In 1873, Motogi established Tsukiji Type Foundry, the first type foundry in Japan. Japanese type foundries invented Gothic typefaces inspired by Latin sans-serif fonts, as well as variations of the Ming typeface. Japanese typefaces influenced type design across China and Japan. Also, the emergence of newspapers in the 19th century made movable type a worthwhile investment.

Following the proclamation of the People's Republic of China in 1949, type designers in mainland China aimed to break free from Japanese stylistic influences by creating typefaces that looked more like handwritten Chinese. Starting in the 1960s, the state-owned Shanghai Printing Technology and Research Institute (SPTRI) developed new typefaces for simplified characters in the four primary type families: Fangsong (or "Imitation Song"), sans-serif Gothic, Ming, and Kaiti. Of these typeface families, the PRC government favored Gothic typefaces because they were plain and "represented a break with the past". The SPTRI was subsequently privatized in the 1990s.

== Font sizes ==
Internationally, font sizes are generally measured by points. The point standard used includes the Didot point system in continental Europe (one point is approximately 0.3759 mm) and the American point system (one point is approximately 0.3515 mm), while China uses the latter point system. In China, in addition to the points measure system, a unique number system called zihao (字号), invented by an American for Chinese printing in 1859, is also used for Chinese characters, where the values are listed on the following table.

Chinese character font size number–point corresponding table
Size number	Chinese name	Points
8	八号	5
7	七号	5.5
Small 6	小六号	6.5
6	六号	7.5
Small 5	小五号	9
5	五号	10.5
Small 4	小四号	12
4	四号	14
Small 3	小三号	15
3	三号	16
Small 2	小二号	18
2	二号	22
Small 1	小一号	24
1	一号	26
Small A (Small primary)	小初号	36
A (primary)	初号	42

== Type families ==
=== Ming ===
The characters 明朝体 'Ming dynasty form' set in the Zen Antique font

Ming typefaces (Mincho in Japanese; also known as Song when used with simplified Chinese) are characterized by contrasting vertical and horizontal strokes. Small triangles called uroko (鱗 'fish scales') are nestled into the stroke, and are analogous to serifs in Latin script type.

=== Gothic ===
Round sans style typeface

East Asian Gothic typeface, known as heiti ('black form') in Chinese, are sans-serif typefaces used with East Asian scripts. They can be further divided into two main types: round sans fonts have rounded ends, while square sans fonts have square ends.

=== Fangsong ===
Fangsong (or "Imitation Song") is a style modeled after that used in Lin'an during the Southern Song dynasty (1127–1279). Fangsong is a class of regular script typeface, and the standard used in official documents produced by the Chinese government, and civil drawings in both China and Taiwan.

=== Kaiti ===
Kaiti typefaces imitate handwritten regular script, as opposed to printed regular script.

== Typographic conventions ==
=== Symbols ===
Japanese has a set of characteristic punctuation marks; see List of Japanese typographic symbols for more details.

Instead of underlines or cursive, Chinese, Japanese and Korean use emphasis marks.

=== Ruby text ===
Ruby characters are small, annotative glosses that are usually placed above or to the right of Chinese characters to indicate their pronunciation.

== See also ==
- List of CJK fonts
- Han unification – work to allocate Unicode code points to CJK characters, identifying any that are only stylistically different.
- Horizontal and vertical writing in East Asian scripts
Gallery
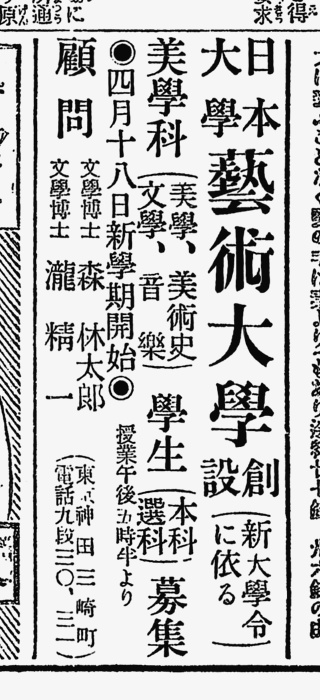
A 1921 advertisement in The Asahi Shimbun

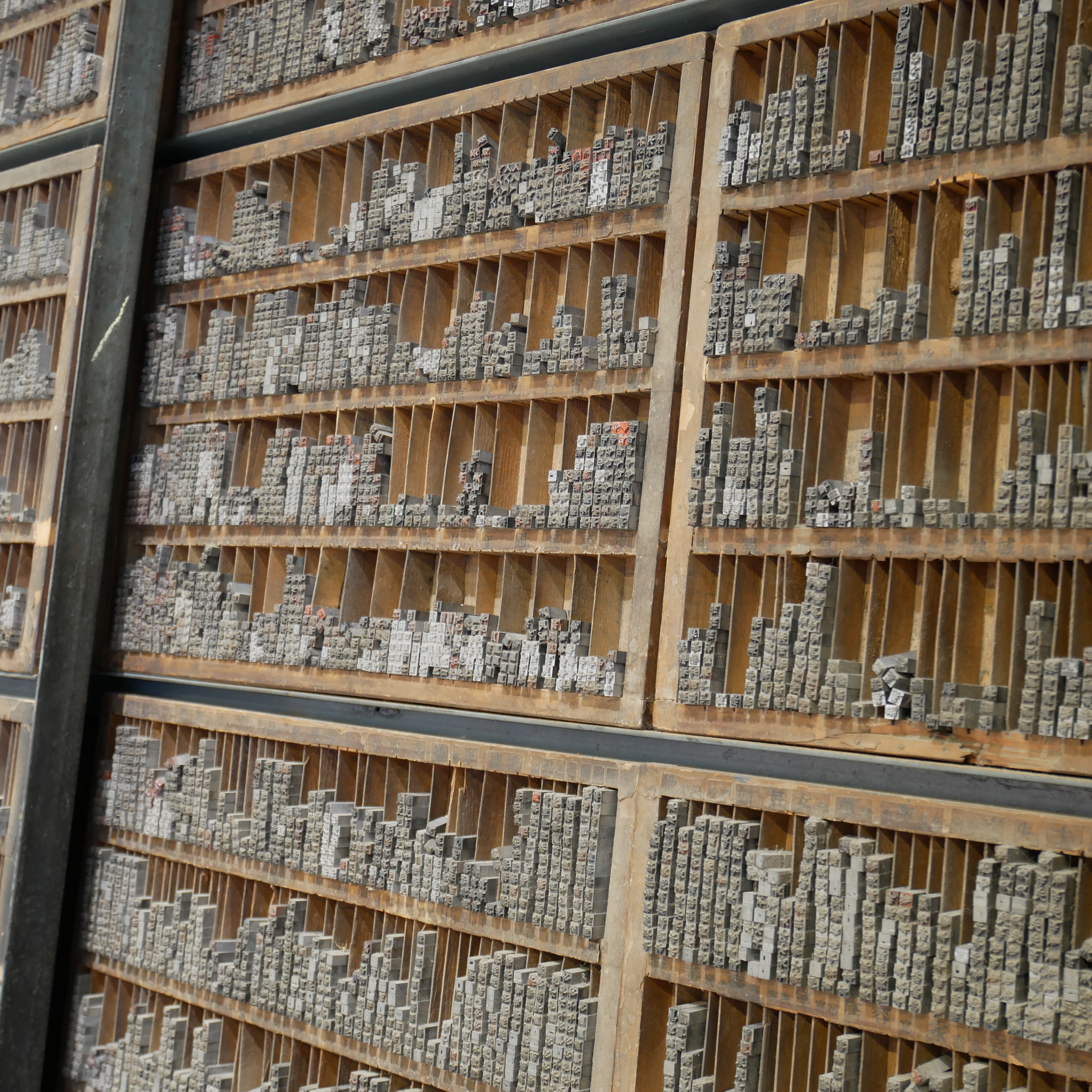
A frame of sorts for traditional Chinese script
