= Fangsong =

Style of East Asian typography

Chinese name
- Traditional Chinese: 仿宋體
- Simplified Chinese: 仿宋体
- Literal meaning: imitation Song font
Transcriptions
Standard Mandarin
- Hanyu Pinyin: fǎngsòng tǐ

Vietnamese name
- Vietnamese: Phỏng Tống thể
- Chữ Hán: 仿宋體

Alternative Japanese name
- Kanji: 宋朝体
Transcriptions
- Revised Hepburn: sōchōtai

The characters 仿宋體 written in a modern Fangsong typeface

The Fangsong script (simplified Chinese: 仿宋体; traditional Chinese: 仿宋體; lit. 'imitation Song font') is a style of serifed typefaces for displaying Chinese characters, modeled after the block-printed and movable type works from Lin'an during the Southern Song dynasty. The script is a printing-oriented variant derived from regular script like its earlier sister Song script, and is identical to the Song script except for much narrower strokes with even thickness between horizon and vertical strokes. Fangsong is the standard modern publication typeface style in official documents issued by the Government of the People's Republic of China, and civil drawings in both Mainland China and Taiwan.

== Characteristics ==
Characteristics of Fangsong typefaces include:

- The basic structure of regular script, with overall geometrical regularity
- Relatively straight strokes, with horizontal strokes slanting up slightly.
- Low stroke width variation between horizontal and vertical strokes, with strokes usually being relatively thin.
- Less pronounced triangular serifs at the end of horizontal strokes, sometimes reduced to only a slanted end.

== History ==
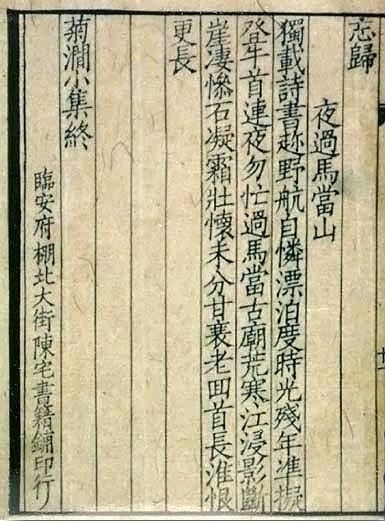
A page of a publication from Chén zhái shūjí bù

The printing industry that began during the Tang dynasty reached an apex in the Song dynasty, during which there were three major areas of production:

- Zhejiang, where publications imitated the regular script of Ouyang Xun
- Sichuan, where publications imitated the regular script of Yan Zhenqing
- Fujian, where publications imitated the regular script of Liu Gongquan

When Song lost control of northern China to the Jin dynasty (1115–1234), its capital was moved to Lin'an (modern Hangzhou), where there was a revival of printing, especially literature from Tang left in what was conquered by the Jin dynasty. Many publishers were established in Lin'an, including Chén zhái shūjí bù (陳宅書籍鋪) established by Chen Qi (陳起), from which publications used a distinct style of regular script with orderly, near-constant-width, straight strokes, simplifying carving for woodblock printing.

Modern typefaces that imitate this Song Dynasty carving style are called Fangsong, or "imitation Song", typefaces. The first typeface of this kind was produced in 1915 by brothers Ding Shanzhi (丁善之) and Ding Fuzhi (丁辅之), based on block-printed books from the Song dynasty as well as the stroke design in a Qing Dynasty copy of The Family Precepts of Mr. Zhu Dailu (朱柏庐先生治家格言) which was block-printed in an imitation Song style. The resulting metal movable typeface was called "Juzhen Fangsong" (聚珍仿宋体). It was used by the Chung Hwa Book Company to print a collection of classical texts called Sibu Beiyao starting in 1921.

== In computing ==
The aforementioned standard uses of Fangsong all make use of digitized typefaces.

"fangsong" was added to the list of generic font families in CSS Font Module Level 4 of 2024. This allows a Fangsong font to be used without knowing its name, the same way writing "serif" in CSS requests any serif font.
