= Shotai =

Shotai may refer to:

- Shotai – a Japanese typeface
- a shotai – a military unit in Japan, equivalent to a platoon, flight (military unit), or section (military unit)
- Shōtai – the Japanese era name for the period from April 898 to July 901

== See also ==
- Plique-à-jour – a vitreous enamelling technique often known by its Japanese name of shotai-jippo (or shotai shippo).
