= Wei stele =

Chinese calligraphic style derived from Northern Dynasties stone inscriptions

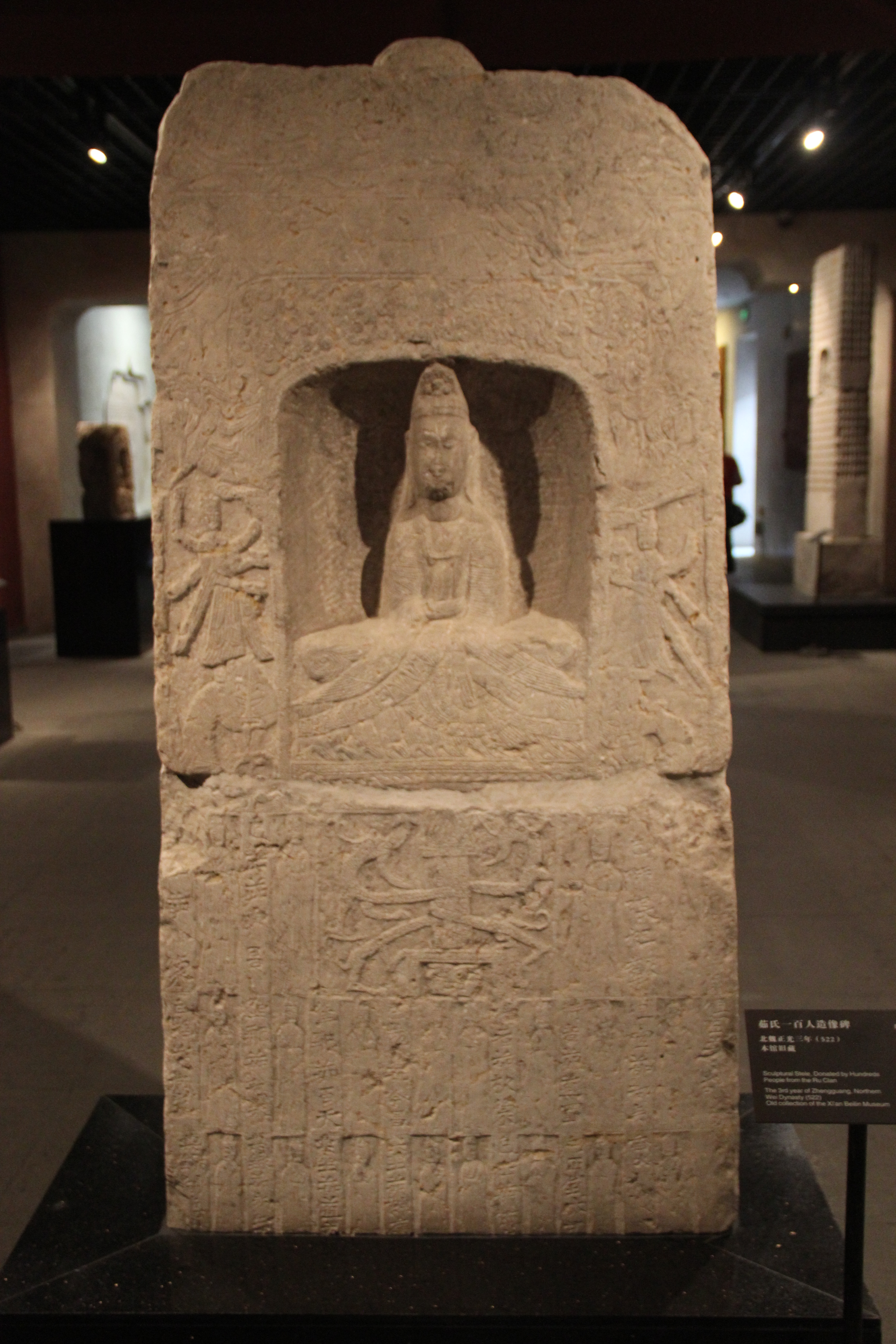
- A Northern Wei stele dated 6th century
- Traditional Chinese: 魏碑
- Simplified Chinese: 魏碑
- Literal meaning: Wei steles
Transcriptions
Standard Mandarin
- Hanyu Pinyin: Wèibēi

Wei stele (Chinese: 魏碑; pinyin: Wèibēi), also known as the Wei stele style or Northern stele style, is a category of Chinese calligraphy derived primarily from inscriptions carved during the Northern Wei dynasty and the other Northern Dynasties. It represents an early style of regular script (kaishu), with brushstrokes for stone carving and sharp, angular turns.

The inscriptions were originally created for religious, funerary, commemorative or administrative purposes. Buddhist patronage was particularly important. During the Northern and Southern Dynasties, large numbers of carved steles and image inscriptions were commissioned by rulers, officials, monastic communities and lay devotional associations.

== History ==
During the Han dynasty, clerical script had become an established form for official and monumental writing. Regular script subsequently emerged through a gradual reorganization of clerical forms, with more clearly separated strokes, increasingly upright character structures and more regularized turning movements. In northern China during the fifth and sixth centuries, these changes are extensively documented by stone inscriptions. Many Wei inscriptions combine the broad proportions and residual horizontal emphasis of clerical script with the more vertical organization and discrete strokes associated with regular script.

The expansion of Buddhist cave construction contributed to the quantity and variety of Northern Wei inscriptions. After Emperor Xiaowen transferred the Northern Wei capital to Luoyang in 494, imperial and private patrons sponsored caves and images at the Longmen Grottoes. Their dedicatory texts became an important body of early regular-script calligraphy. Other inscriptions were carved on cliffs, tombstones, epitaph tablets and freestanding religious monuments across present-day Henan, Shandong, Shaanxi, Shanxi and neighboring regions.

After the division of the Northern Wei, northern inscriptional styles continued under its successor states. During the Sui dynasty, northern stone-calligraphy traditions were increasingly combined with the manuscript and model-book traditions associated with southern calligraphy. The remaining influence of clerical script gradually diminished, while regular-script structures became more consistent. Tang calligraphers subsequently developed highly regulated forms of regular script, but many of the structural solutions visible in Tang monumental writing had precedents in Northern Dynasties inscriptions. Wei stele is consequently regarded as a formative stage and an important foundation of mature regular script, rather than as a separate script unrelated to it.

== Characteristics ==
Wei stele inscriptions vary substantially by date, location and function. They should not be reduced to a single set of visual rules. Nevertheless, many examples display firmly articulated strokes, pronounced changes of direction and relatively compact internal structures. Angular beginnings, endings and turns are especially common in inscriptions traditionally described as using the “square-brush” manner. Other works employ rounded strokes and more even line widths, demonstrating that Northern Wei calligraphy also included styles derived from seal-script and southern calligraphic traditions.

The relationship between brush and chisel is a defining aspect of the style. Triangular stroke endings and sharply cut corners may preserve deliberate features of the written model, but they could also be emphasized during engraving. Cliff inscriptions often have broader, more open structures suited to large natural surfaces, while epitaphs and small dedicatory texts tend to use denser arrangements. The resulting corpus ranges from rugged and asymmetrical writing to carefully balanced and technically controlled regular script.

== Representative inscriptions ==
The best-known group is the Longmen Twenty Pieces, a selection of twenty Northern Wei dedicatory inscriptions from the Longmen Grottoes. Nineteen are located in or associated with Guyang Cave. The group was selected and circulated through rubbings because of its calligraphic importance and became one of the principal models for studying the angular forms of Northern Wei regular script.

The Stele of Zhang Menglong was engraved in 522 in honor of Zhang Menglong, a governor of Lu Commandery. Its main inscription consists of twenty-four lines of regular script and is noted for its varied character structures and strongly articulated strokes. The stele is preserved at the Temple of Confucius in Qufu, and historical rubbings of it became influential models for later calligraphers.

The Stele for Duke Wen of Zheng, generally known as the Zheng Wengong Stele, was carved in Shandong in 511 and is associated with the official and calligrapher Zheng Daozhao. In contrast to the sharply angular manner of many Longmen inscriptions, it uses relatively even, rounded strokes and shows the influence of seal script. Its treatment illustrates the stylistic diversity contained within the category of Wei stele.

The Shimen Inscription (Shimen ming) is a large Northern Wei cliff inscription commemorating the reopening of a mountain plank road. Its expansive characters respond to the irregular rock surface and represent the monumental cliff-inscription branch of the northern regular-script tradition.

== Later reception ==
During the nineteenth century, Wei stele became a central source for the Stele School of calligraphy. Theorists including Bao Shichen and Kang Youwei promoted Northern Dynasties inscriptions for their structural variety and perceived antiquity. Kang's writings became among the most widely read statements of Stele School theory and helped establish Wei inscriptions as major models for modern calligraphic practice.

Zhao Zhiqian developed a distinctive square-brush manner from Northern Wei engraved writing, combining stele-derived regular script with his work in seal script and seal carving. In the twentieth century, calligraphers such as Yu Youren continued to study northern steles and adapted their structures to writing with brush and ink. Through these revivals, Wei stele changed from a historical body of carved inscriptions into a continuing category of calligraphic practice.
