= Liu Gongquan =

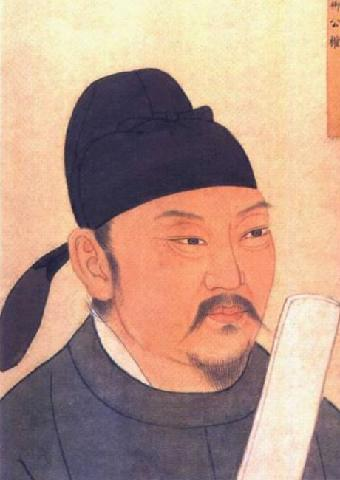
Liu Gongquan

Liu Gongquan (simplified Chinese: 柳公权; traditional Chinese: 柳公權; pinyin: Liǔ Gōngquán; Wade–Giles: Liu Kungch'üan), courtesy name Chengxuan (誠懸) (778—865), was a Chinese calligrapher, essayist, and politician who lived during the late Tang dynasty. Liu Gongquan was especially famous for regular script (楷書) and was one of the 4 calligraphic masters of regular script in China. The other three were Yan Zhenqing, Ouyang Xun and Zhao Mengfu.

== Style ==
A minister like Yan of the Tang dynasty, Liu was a native of today's Tongchuan, Shaanxi, a devout Buddhist and follower of Yan's style of writing. Like him an expert of the regular script, Liu's works were imitated for centuries after and he is often referred in unison with his famed predecessor as "Yan-Liu".

== Calligraphy ==
External videos
- Liu's Calligraphy 玄秘塔碑

Xuan mi ta bei (玄秘塔碑) from the Forest of Steles in Xi'an.

Liu Gongquan

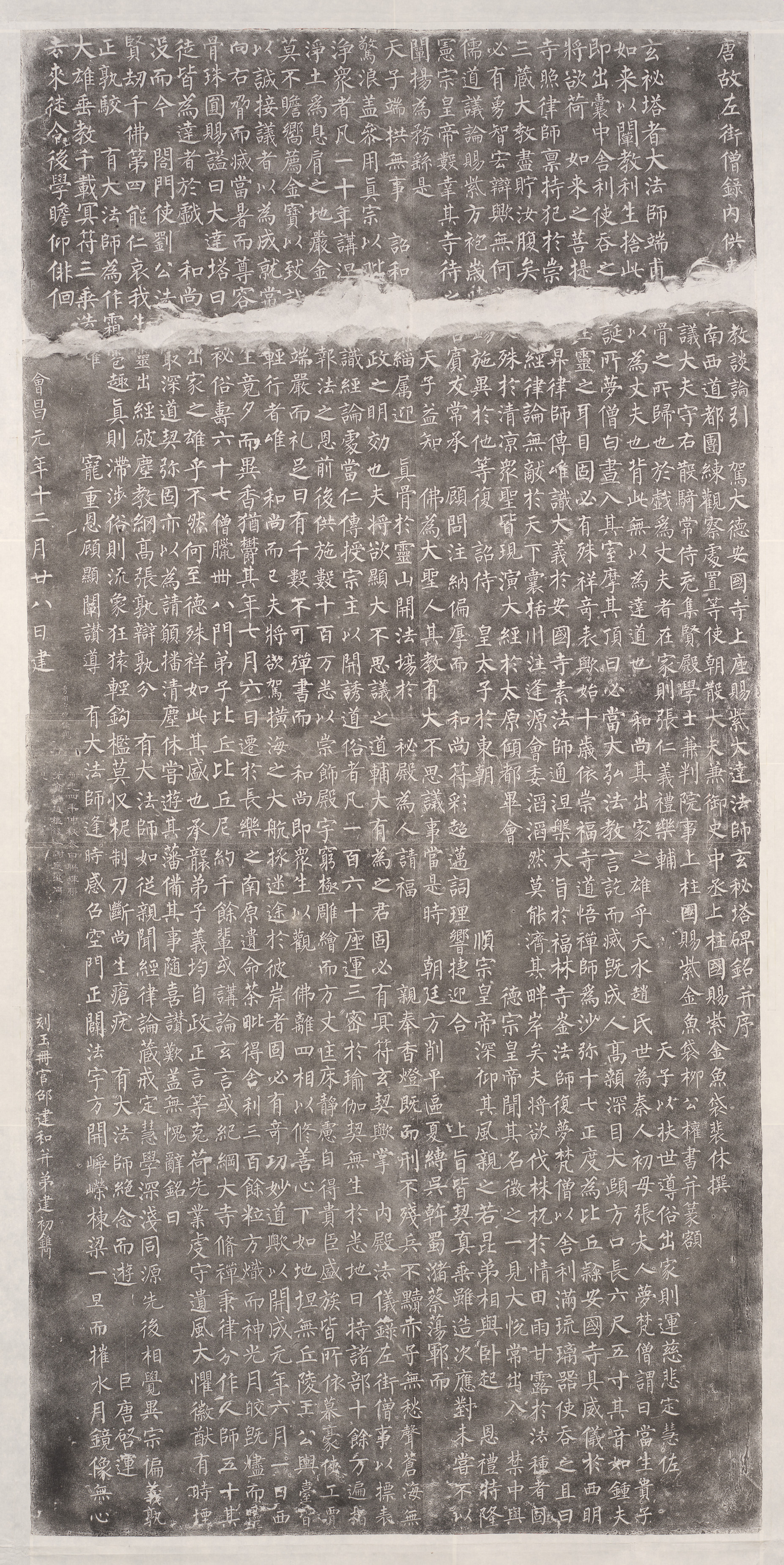

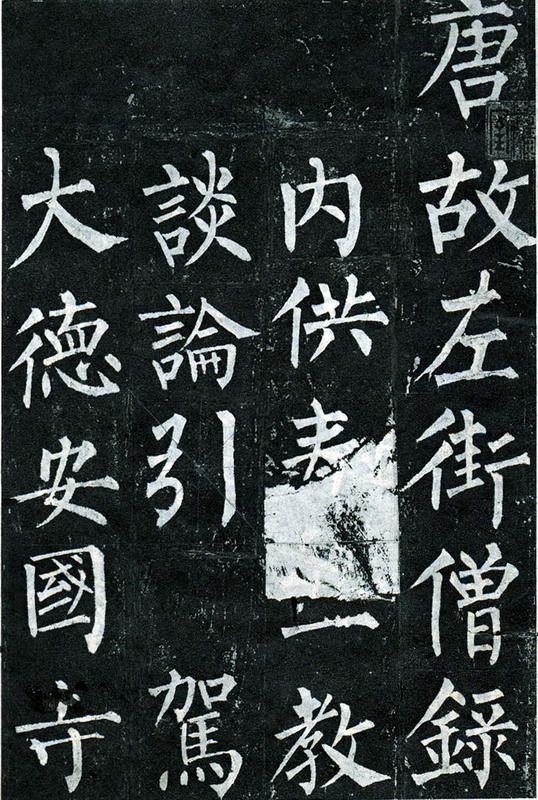

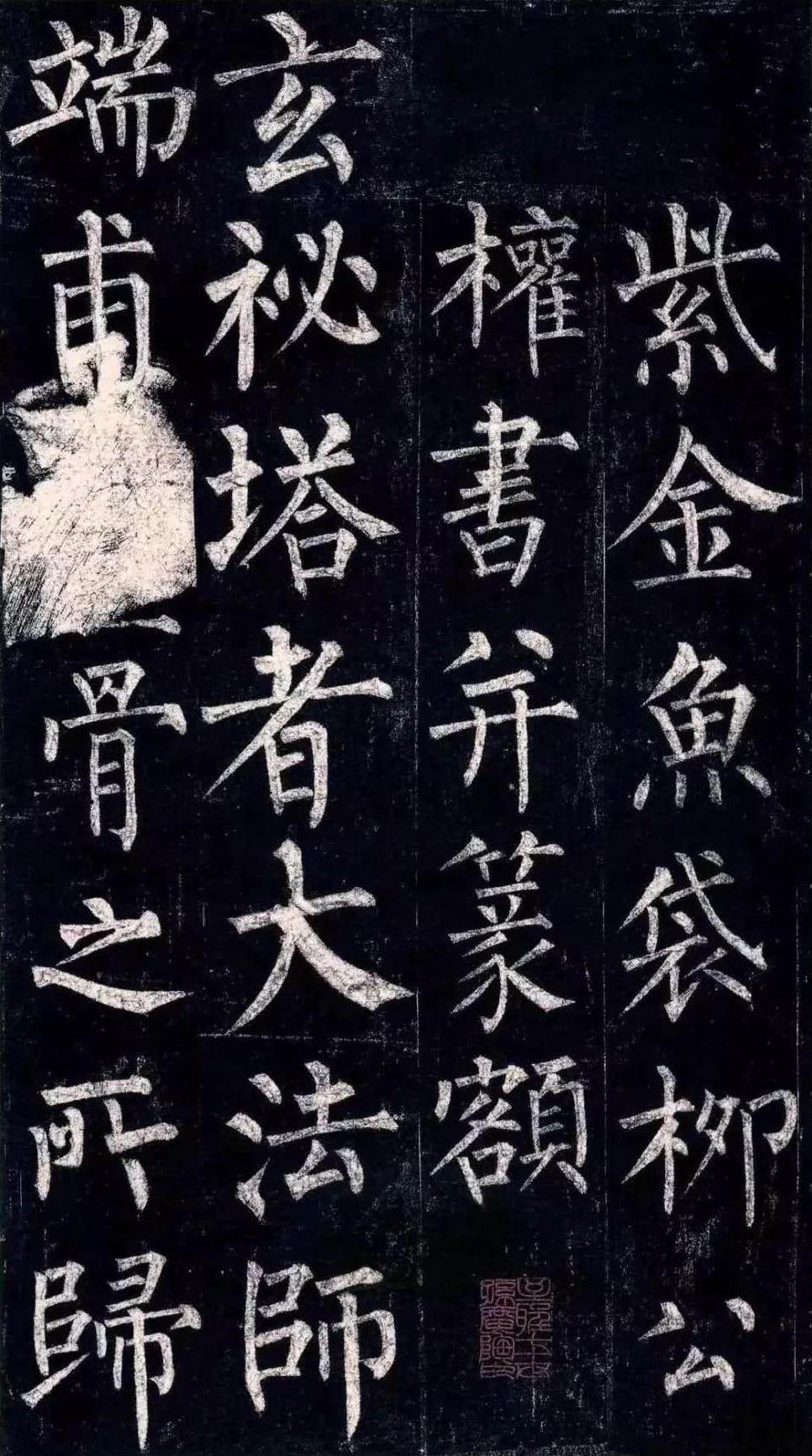
