= Chinese script styles =

Styles of writing Chinese characters

Chinese characters may be written using several major historical styles, which developed organically over the history of Chinese script. There are also various major regional styles associated with various modern and historical polities.

== Styles ==
The traditional model of scripts appearing suddenly in a well-defined order has been discredited by modern comparative study, which clearly indicates the gradual evolution and coexistence of styles.

Historical Chinese character scripts
Name	First appearance
Oracle bone script	c. 1200 BC
Large seal script	c. 1000 BC
Small seal script	c. 500 BC
Clerical script	c. 200 BC
Semi-cursive	c. 200 BC
Cursive	c. 50 BC
Regular script	c. 150 AD

When used in decorative ornamentation, such as book covers, movie posters, and wall hangings, characters are often written in ancient variations or simplifications that deviate from the modern standards used in Chinese, Japanese, Vietnamese or Korean. Modern variations or simplifications of characters, akin to Chinese simplified characters or Japanese shinjitai are occasionally used, especially since many simplified forms derive from cursive forms.

The Japanese syllabaries of katakana and hiragana are used in calligraphy; katakana were derived from the shapes of regular script characters, and hiragana were derived from cursive forms. Following the Korean War hangul saw increased use in calligraphy. In Vietnam, recent calligraphy tends to use the Vietnamese alphabet in parallel with both chữ Hán and chữ Nôm characters.

== Seal script ==
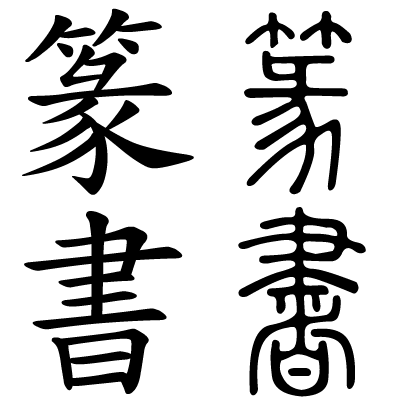

The seal script is the formal system of character forms that evolved in the state of Qin during the Eastern Zhou dynasty (c. 771 – 256 BC), and later imposed as the standard across the country following Qin's wars of unification. Although some modern calligraphers practice the most ancient oracle bone script as well as various other scripts older than seal script found on Zhou dynasty bronze inscriptions, seal script is the oldest style that continues to be widely practised.

Today, seal script is predominantly used for the seals that give it its English name. Though East Asian seals—or name chops—are carved in materials like wood and jade, the forms themselves were originally written with brush and ink on bamboo slips and other media. Most modern readers cannot easily decipher seal script, and it is generally not used outside calligraphy and the production of seals. However, because seals act like legal signatures in the cultures of China, Japan, Korea, and Vietnam, and because vermilion seal impressions are fundamental to aesthetic presentations of art like calligraphy and paintings, seal script remains ubiquitous.

== Clerical script ==

The clerical script (隶书; 隸書 lìshū)—sometimes called official, draft, or scribal script—is popularly thought to have developed in the Han dynasty and to have come directly from seal script, but recent archaeological discoveries and scholarship indicate that it instead developed from a roughly executed and rectilinear popular or "vulgar" variant of the seal script as well as seal script itself, resulting first in what are called "proto-clerical" forms during the Warring States period and Qin dynasty—which then developed into clerical script during the early Han, and matured stylistically thereafter.

Clerical script characters are often "flat" in appearance, being wider than the preceding seal script and the modern standard script, both of which tend to be taller than they are wide; some versions of clerical are square, and others are wider. Compared with the preceding seal script, forms are strikingly rectilinear; however, some curvature and some seal script influence often remains. Seal script tended towards uniformity of stroke width, but clerical script gave the brush freer rein, returning to the variations in width seen in early Zhōu brushwork. Most noticeable is the dramatically flared tail of one dominant horizontal or downward-diagonal stroke, especially that to the lower right. This characteristic stroke has famously been called 'silkworm head and wild goose tail' (蠶頭雁尾 cántóu yànwěi) due to its distinctive shape.

The proto-clerical script that was used from the Warring States period to the early Han dynasty can often be difficult to read for a modern East Asian person, but the mature clerical script of the middle to late Han dynasty is generally legible. Modern calligraphy and practical applications like advertisements that use the clerical script tend to use the mature Han style, and may also use modernized character structures, resulting in a form as transparent and legible as regular (or standard) script. The clerical script remains common as a typeface used for decorative purposes (for example, in displays), but other than in artistic calligraphy, adverts and signage, it is not commonly written.

== Semi-cursive script ==

The semi-cursive script (行書 xíngshū) approximates normal handwriting in which strokes and, more rarely, characters are allowed to run into one another. In writing in the semi-cursive script, the brush leaves the paper less often than in the regular script. Characters appear less angular and instead rounder.

In general, an educated person in China or Japan can read characters written in the semi-cursive script with relative ease, but may have occasional difficulties with certain idiosyncratic shapes.

== Cursive script ==

The cursive script (草書 cǎoshū), sometimes called sloppy script, is a fully cursive script, with drastic simplifications requiring specialized knowledge; hence it is difficult to read for those unfamiliar with it.

Entire characters may be written without lifting the brush from the paper at all, and characters frequently flow into one another. Strokes are modified or eliminated to facilitate smooth writing and to create a beautiful, abstract appearance. Characters are highly rounded and soft in appearance, with a noticeable lack of angular lines. Due to the drastic simplification and ligature involved, this script is not considered particularly legible to the average person, and thus has never achieved widespread use beyond the realm of literati calligraphers.

The cursive script is the source of Japanese hiragana, as well as many modern simplified forms in Simplified Chinese characters and Japanese shinjitai.

== Regular script ==
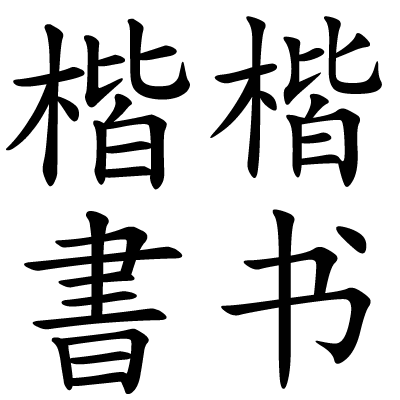

The regular script (楷書 kǎishū) is the last major calligraphic style to develop, emerging during the Han and Three Kingdoms periods, gaining dominance during the Northern and Southern period (420–589), and ultimately maturing during the Tang dynasty (619–908). It emerged from a neatly written, semi-cursive form of clerical script. As the name suggests, the regular script has been highly regularized, with the strokes made distinct from one another, in deliberate brush stroked lifting off the paper.

Regular script is the most widely recognized style, and is the form taught to children in East Asian countries and others first learning to write characters. For students of calligraphy, regular script is usually studied first in order to provide students a base of knowledge from which to learn other, more flowing styles, including a sense of correct placement and balance.

Ming typefaces (明體 míngtǐ) are derived from the regular script since the Song dynasty.

== Edomoji ==
Edomoji comprises a large family of calligraphic styles native to Japan, named for the Edo period in Japanese history when they were created. Examples include 'sumo letters' (sumōmoji) used to write sumo wrestling posters, kanteiryū used for kabuki, and higemoji. These styles are typically not taught in Japanese calligraphy schools.

== Munjado ==
Munjado is a Korean decorative style of rendering Chinese characters in which brush strokes are replaced with representational paintings that provide commentary on the meaning. The characters thus rendered are traditionally those for the eight Confucian virtues of humility, honor, duty, propriety, trust, loyalty, brotherly love, and filial piety.

== Lệnh thư ==
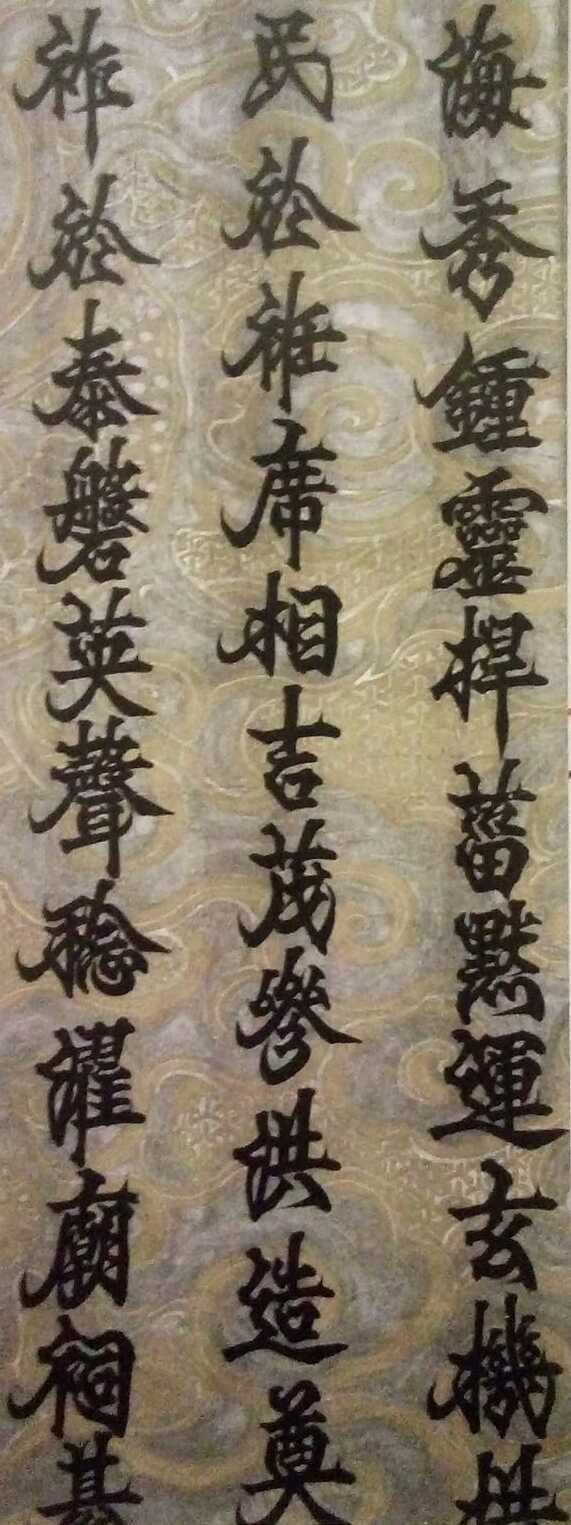
A 1765 edict from the reign of Cảnh Hưng (1740–1786) showing characters written in Lệnh thư

A Vietnamese calligraphic script known as Lệnh thư (令書), as its name suggests, is mainly found in imperial edicts starting from the Revival Lê dynasty. The writing script is defined by its distinct sharp upward hooks.

== Huaya ==
A huaya is a stylized calligraphic signature traditionally used by emperors, politicians, artists, and craftsmen across East Asia.

== See also ==
- Chinese calligraphy
- Eight Principles of Yong
- Stroke order
- Wonton font
