= Regular script =

Style for writing Chinese characters

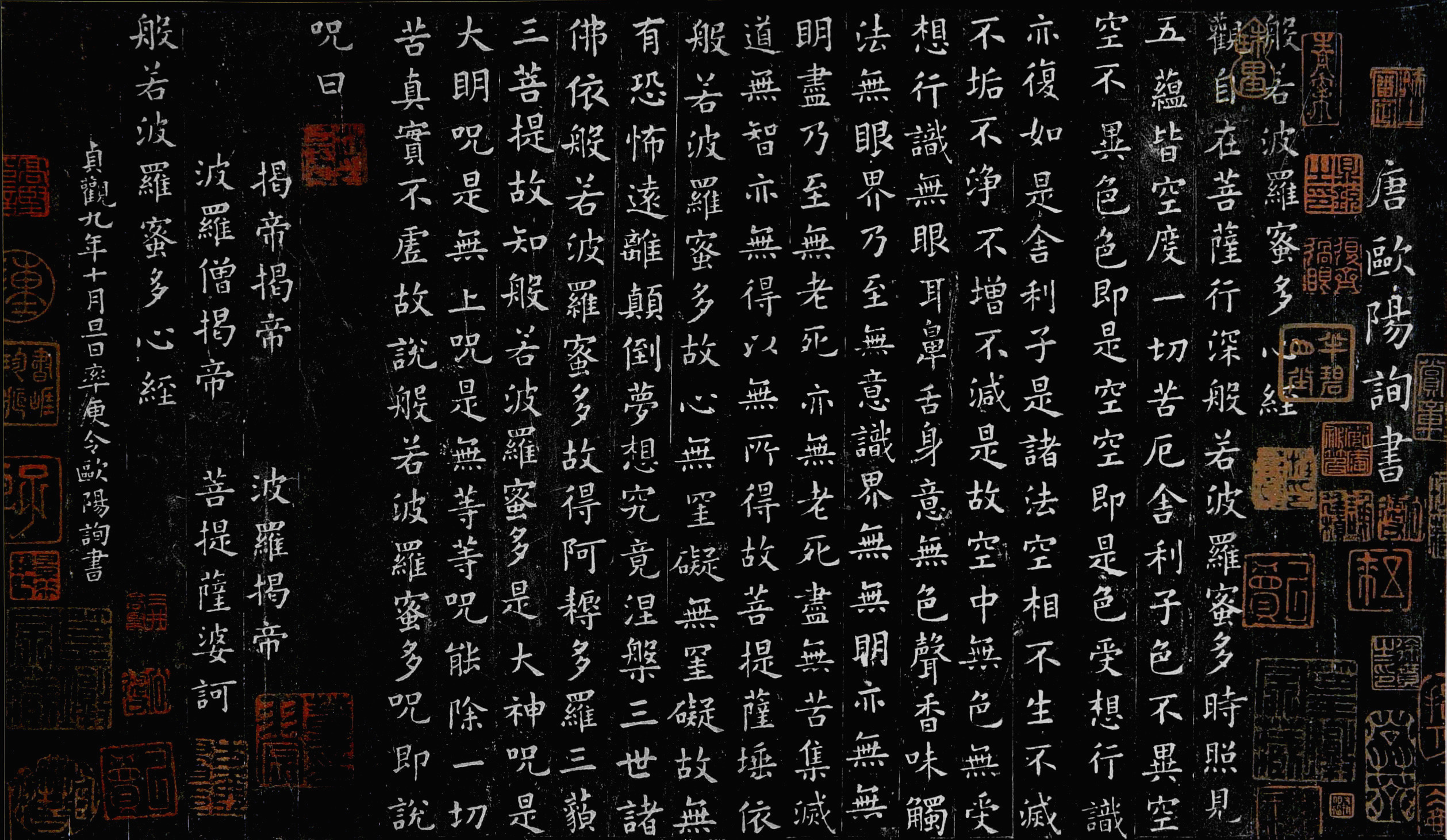
- Heart Sutra by Ouyang Xun in regular script, 635
- Script type: Logographic
- Period: c. 2nd century CE – present

Related scripts
- Parent systems: Oracle bone script: Small seal script; Clerical script; Regular script
- Child systems: Ming typefaces; Fangsong; Nüshu; Hanja

Unicode
- Unicode range: U+4E00–U+9FFF CJK Unified Ideographs (most common); (full list)

Regular script
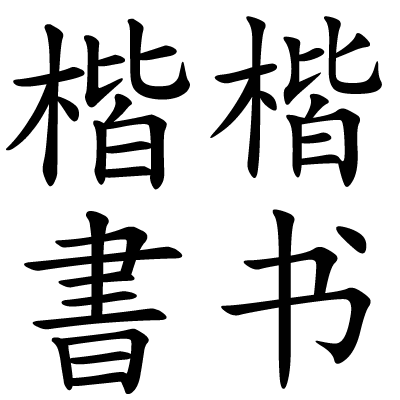
- Chinese characters for 'regular script' in traditional (left) and simplified (right).

Chinese name
- Traditional Chinese: 楷書
- Simplified Chinese: 楷书
- Literal meaning: model script
Transcriptions
Standard Mandarin
- Hanyu Pinyin: kǎishū
- Bopomofo: ㄎㄞˇ ㄕㄨ
- Wade–Giles: kʻai^{3}-shu^{1}
Yue: Cantonese
- Yale Romanization: kaái syū
- Jyutping: kaai2 syu1
- Canton Romanization: kai2 xu1

Alternative Chinese name
- Traditional Chinese: 真書
- Simplified Chinese: 真书
- Literal meaning: real script
Transcriptions
Standard Mandarin
- Hanyu Pinyin: zhēnshū
- Bopomofo: ㄓㄣ ㄕㄨ
- Wade–Giles: chên^{1}-shu^{1}
Yue: Cantonese
- Yale Romanization: jān syū
- Jyutping: zan1 syu1
- Canton Romanization: zen1 xu1

Second alternative Chinese name
- Chinese: 正楷
- Literal meaning: correct model
Transcriptions
Standard Mandarin
- Hanyu Pinyin: zhèngkǎi
- Bopomofo: ㄓㄥˋ ㄎㄞˇ
- Wade–Giles: chêng^{4}-k'ai^{3}
Yue: Cantonese
- Yale Romanization: jing kaái
- Jyutping: zing3 kaai2
- Canton Romanization: jing3 kai2

Third alternative Chinese name
- Traditional Chinese: 楷體
- Simplified Chinese: 楷体
- Literal meaning: model form
Transcriptions
Standard Mandarin
- Hanyu Pinyin: kǎitǐ
- Bopomofo: ㄎㄞˇ ㄊㄧˇ
- Wade–Giles: k'ai^{3}-t'i^{3}
Yue: Cantonese
- Yale Romanization: kaái tái
- Jyutping: kaai2 tai2
- Canton Romanization: kai2 tei2

Fourth alternative Chinese name
- Traditional Chinese: 正書
- Simplified Chinese: 正书
- Literal meaning: correct script
Transcriptions
Standard Mandarin
- Hanyu Pinyin: zhèngshū
- Bopomofo: ㄓㄥˋ ㄕㄨ
- Wade–Giles: chêng^{4}-shu^{1}
Yue: Cantonese
- Yale Romanization: jing syū
- Jyutping: zing3 syu1
- Canton Romanization: jing3 xu1

Vietnamese name
- Vietnamese alphabet: khải thư; chữ khải
- Hán-Nôm: 楷書; 𡨸楷

Japanese name
- Kanji: 楷書
- Hiragana: かいしょ
Transcriptions
- Romanization: Kaisho

The regular script (Note: Regular script is referred to by several related names in Chinese, including 楷書; 楷书; kǎishū, 正楷; zhèngkǎi, 真書; 真书; zhēnshū, 楷體; 楷体; kǎitǐ, and 正書; 正书; zhèngshū. It is sometimes called block script, standard script, or square style in English.) is the newest of the major Chinese script styles, emerging during the Three Kingdoms period c. 230 CE, and stylistically mature by the 7th century. It is the most common style used in modern text. In its traditional form it is the third-most common in publishing after the Ming and Gothic types used exclusively in print.

== History ==
The Xuanhe Calligraphy Manual (宣和書譜) credits Wang Cizhong with creating the regular script, based on the clerical script of the early Han dynasty (202 BCE – 220 CE). It became popular during the Eastern Han and Three Kingdoms periods, with Zhong Yao (c. 151 – 230), a calligrapher in the state of Cao Wei (220–266), being credited as its first master, known as the father of regular script. His famous works include the Xuanshi biao (宣示表), Jianjizhi biao (薦季直表), and Liming biao (力命表). Palaeographer Qiu Xigui describes the script in Xuanshi biao as:

...clearly emerging from the womb of early period semi-cursive script. If one were to write the tidily written variety of early period semi-cursive script in a more dignified fashion and were to use consistently the pause technique [(頓; dùn)], used to reinforce the beginning or ending of a stroke when ending horizontal strokes, a practice which already appears in early period semi-cursive script, and further were to make use of right-falling strokes with thick feet, the result would be a style of calligraphy like that in the "Xuān shì biǎo".

However, very few wrote in this script at the time other than a few literati; most continued writing in the neo-clerical script, or a hybrid form of semi-cursive and neo-clerical. The regular script did not become dominant until the 5th century during the early Northern and Southern period (420–589); there was a variety of the regular script which emerged from neo-clerical as well as regular scripts known as 'Wei regular' (魏楷; Wèikǎi) or 'Wei stele' (魏碑; Wèibēi). Thus, the regular script is descended both from the early semi-cursive style as well as from the neo-clerical script.

The script is considered to have become stylistically mature during the Tang dynasty (618–907), with the most famous and oft-imitated calligraphers of that period being the early Tang's Four Great Calligraphers (初唐四大家): Ouyang Xun, Yu Shinan, Chu Suiliang, and Xue Ji, as well as the tandem of Yan Zhenqing and Liu Gongquan.

During the Northern Song (960–1127), Emperor Huizong created an iconic style known as 'slender gold' (瘦金體; shòujīntǐ). During the Yuan dynasty (1271–1368), Zhao Mengfu (1254–1322) also became known for his own calligraphic style for the regular script, called Zhaoti (趙體).

92 rules governing the fundamental structure of regular script were established during the Qing dynasty (1644–1912); the calligrapher Huang Ziyuan wrote a guidebook illustrating these rules, with four characters provided as an example for each.

== Characteristics ==
The Eight Principles of Yong encapsulate varieties of most strokes that appear in the regular script. Regular script characters with dimensions larger than 5 cm (2 in) are usually classified as 'large' (大楷; dàkǎi); those smaller than 2 cm (0.8 in) are usually classified as 'small' (小楷; xiǎokǎi), and those in between are 'medium' (中楷; zhōngkǎi).

Notable works written in regular script include the Northern and Southern-era Records of Yao Boduo Sculpturing (姚伯多造像記) and Tablet of General Guangwu (廣武將軍碑), the Sui-era Tablet of Longzang Temple (龍藏寺碑), Tombstone Record of Sui Xiaoci (蘇孝慈墓誌), and Tombstone Record of Beauty Tong (董美人墓誌), and the Tang-era Sweet Spring at Jiucheng Palace (九成宮醴泉銘).

== Derivative styles ==
- Fangsong typefaces are based on a printed style which developed during the Song dynasty (970–1279)
- The most common printed typeface styles, Ming and sans-serif, are based on Fangsong
- Japanese textbook typefaces kyōkashotai (教科書体) are based on regular script, but stylised so that they appear to be written with a pencil or pen. They also follow the jōyō kanji character forms.
- The bopomofo semi-syllabograms are nearly always written using regular script strokes.

== Gallery ==
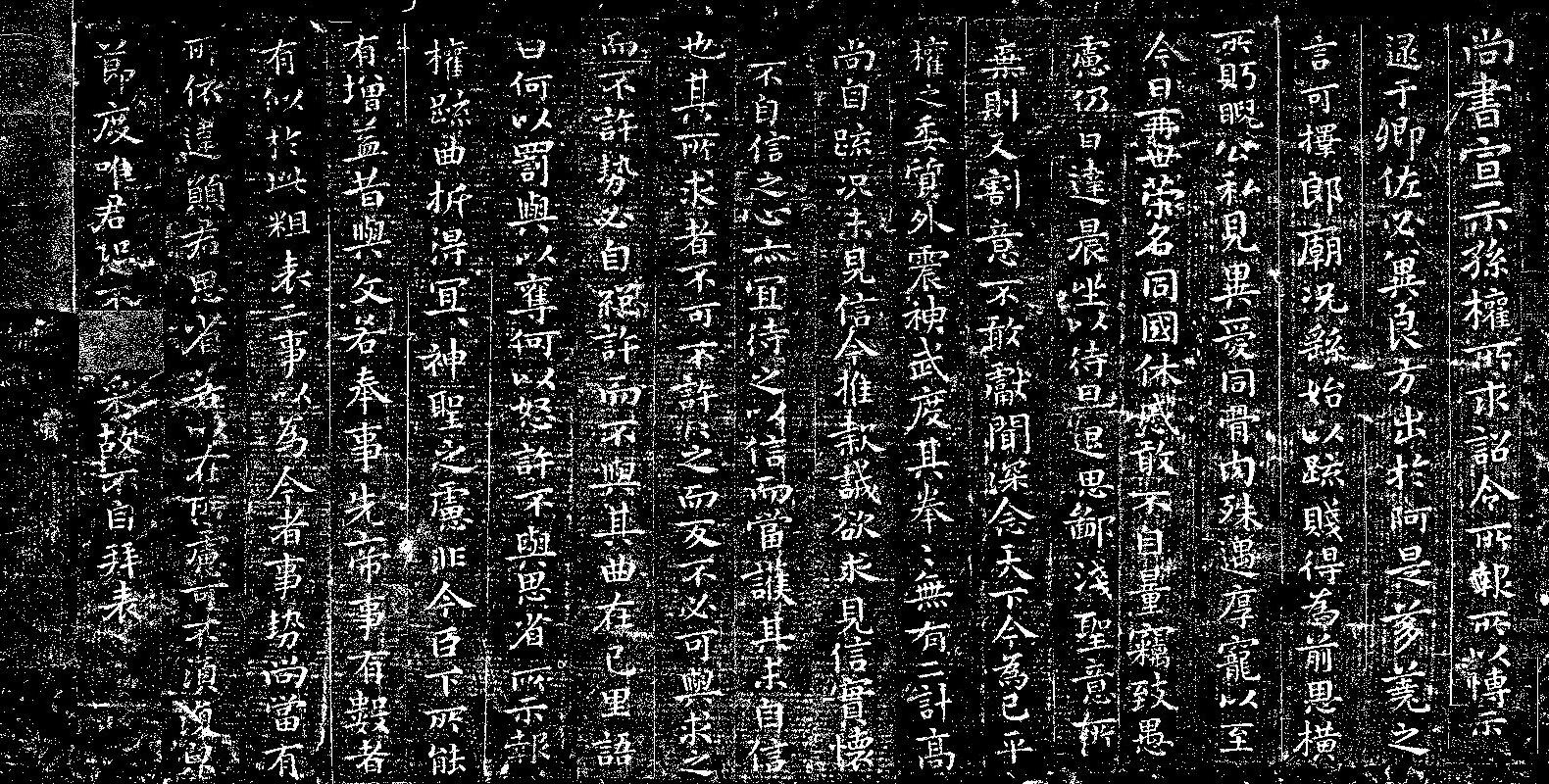
Xuanshi Biao by Zhong Yao, written during the early transition from clerical script to regular script

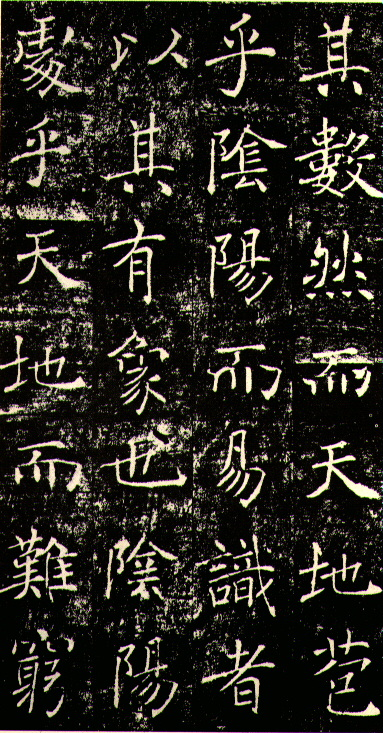
Sheng Jiao Xu by Chu Suiliang, (Note: 其數然而天地苞 乎陰陽而易識者 以其有象也陰陽 處乎天地而難窮) an example of regular script
