= Customization (anthropology) =

Customization is the process in which an individual or a group appropriates a product or practice of another culture and makes it their own.

== Introduction ==
In the introduction to their book The Anthropology of Globalization: a Reader, Inda and Rosaldo examine the dynamics of cultural customization in the face of globalization. They argue that as more people and cultures "are being cast into intense and immediate contact with each other", culture begins to lose its geographic associations, and becomes re-attached to another location. The authors refer to this as reterritorialization, the "process of reinscribing culture in new time-space contexts, of relocalizing it in specific cultural environments".

Within this argument, they make clear that in being reterritorialized, cultural materials are often changed and customized according to the receiving culture, that "they are interpreted, translated, and appropriated according to local conditions of reception". This is important because it challenges the image of the viewer as passive, someone who simply consumes culture without engaging with it. The concept of customization acknowledges the viewer's role in reconstructing cultural objects and practices and forming them to fit their new location. These interpretations are often drastically different from the intentions of the original producer. Even as customization recycles culture, it also allows for its re-creation.

== Customization and consumerism ==
When examining customization within consumerism, the consumer as an individual is seen as self-consciously manipulating the symbolic meanings of given products. According to Campbell in his piece "The Craft Consumer", this is done by selecting goods with specific intentions in mind to alter them. Campbell argues that consumers do this in an attempt to create or maintain their lifestyle or to construct their identity. Instead of accepting a foreign object for what it is, the foreign object is incorporated and changed to fit one's lifestyle and choices.

Take for example, the baseball cap. The producer of the baseball cap designed it to be worn with the bill facing forward, while the ‘customizer’ might have a different intended purpose. The 'customizer' might choose to change the orientation of the bill to meet a particular cultural aesthetic. Within this example, one sees that even products can be manipulated to serve individuals within the culture that the product is sold. Campbell argues that this is in an attempt to reinforce belonging within their culture.

== Customization and globalization ==
In the face of globalization, cultural practices are increasingly becoming more accessible and more people are being exposed to them. In this multicultural space, customization is helpful in maintaining one's culture from afar. In his piece the "German Dual System", Theodor Lewis argues that during this process a ‘decommodification’ occurs, where a commodity changes from being the "norm" to holding a personal value, often cultural.

Lewis provides an example of customization. He examines the adaptation of human resource development models within the educational sector of less developed countries, documenting the various ways in which these countries adapt these models, whether they be imposed or taken on voluntarily. The goal behind their implementation is to stimulate "new growth and competitiveness in newly industrialized countries". Within his paper, he notes that the following methods of cultural exchange are used:

- cultural borrowing
- partial borrowing
- pilot borrowing
- customization
- conceptual borrowing

However, within the review, customization is found to be most effective. Lewis argues that customization allows each country to take their own needs into account while allowing for cultural flows. This is important because cultural flows are often inevitable. Instead of working against them, customization accommodates and incorporates them. Reporter Jeong explains within the article that due to the borrowing of this system, South Korea was able to modernize rapidly. Taking a customization approach is a "quick study of the experiences of older industrialized countries.
