= Yan Zhenqing =

Chinese calligrapher, military general, and politician

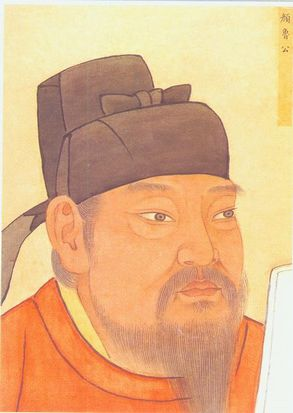
- Traditional Chinese: 顏真卿
- Simplified Chinese: 颜真卿
Transcriptions
Standard Mandarin
- Hanyu Pinyin: Yán Zhēnqīng
- Wade–Giles: Yen Chen-ch'ing

Courtesy name
- Chinese: 清臣
Transcriptions
Standard Mandarin
- Hanyu Pinyin: Qingchen

Alias
- Chinese: 顏平原
Transcriptions
Standard Mandarin
- Hanyu Pinyin: Yan Pingyuan

Other alias
- Chinese: 顏魯公
Transcriptions
Standard Mandarin
- Hanyu Pinyin: Yan Lugong

Posthumous name
- Chinese: 文忠
Transcriptions
Standard Mandarin
- Hanyu Pinyin: Wenzhong

Yan Zhenqing (simplified Chinese: 颜真卿; traditional Chinese: 顏真卿; pinyin: Yán Zhēnqīng; Wade–Giles: Yen Chen-ch'ing; 709 – 23 August 784) was a Chinese calligrapher, military general, and politician. He was a leading Chinese calligrapher and a loyal governor of the Tang dynasty. His artistic accomplishment in Chinese calligraphy is equal to that of the greatest master calligraphers of history, and his regular script style, Yan, has often been imitated.

== Biography ==
=== Early life ===
Yan Zhenqing was born in Wannian (萬年), near the Tang capital Chang'an, to a highly reputed academic family (Langya Yan Clan, 琅邪颜氏) which served the court for many generations. One of his ancestors was Yan Zhitui, a scholar-official during the Southern and Northern Dynasties. His great-great-grandfather Yan Shigu was a famous linguist while his father Yan Weizhen (顏惟貞) was private tutor to the Tang princes' and a great calligrapher himself. Under the influence of family tradition and the strict instruction of his mother, Lady Yin (殷氏), Yan Zhenqing worked hard from childhood and was well-read in literature and Confucianism.

In 734, at the age of 22, Yan Zhenqing qualified at the national wide imperial examination and was granted the title of Jinshi (a rough equivalent of the modern day doctorate). He then gained the rare opportunity of taking a special imperial examination that was set for candidates with extraordinary talents, again excelling in it. With his outstanding academic background, Yan Zhengqing rose rapidly through the bureaucratic ladder: he was appointed vice-magistrate of Liquan District (醴泉尉), then later Investigating Censor (監察御史) and Palace Censor (殿中侍御史). His uprightness and outspoken style were hailed by the common people, but angered Grand Councilor Yang Guozhong; as a result, in 753, he was sent out of the capital as the governor of Pingyuan Commandery.

Tang dynasty's territory before An Lushan Rebellion

=== Civil war ===
By the time Yan Zhenqing took up the post of governor of Pingyuan, the An Shi Rebellion was imminent. With his political sensitivity, Yan Zhenqing immediately started preparing for war by fortifying the city wall and stocking up provisions. He also sent emergency memorial to Emperor Xuanzong, but was ignored.

In December 755, An Lushan and Shi Siming rebelled under the name of removing Yang Guozhong. The ill-prepared Tang government troops retreated with little resistance from all the prefectures in Heshuo (河朔) area (which includes the present day provinces of Shandong, Hebei and Henan); only Yan Zhenqing's Pingyuan sustained through. He then combined force with his cousin, Yan Gaoqing (顏杲卿), who was the governor of Changshan (常山太守) (present day Quyang, Hebei), fighting the rebels at their rear. The government in its desperation, promoted Yan Zhenqing to Deputy Minister of Finance (户部侍郎), and conferred him great military power to assist General Li Guangbi (李光弼) in the suppression of the rebellion.

Thereafter Yan's force won several major battles over the rebels, including successfully cutting the rebel supply lines and regaining control over seventeen commanderies in Heshuo area. In 756, Emperor Suzong ascended the throne from Emperor Xuanzong and promoted Yan Zhenqing to Minister of Works (工部尚書). Due to poor military deployment by the Tang government, An Lushan managed to attack Hebei by surprise, and Yan Zhenqing reluctantly abandoned his command, returning to the court in 757. He was then appointed Minister of Law (刑部尚書), but his outspokenness against corrupt higher-ranking officials resulted in himself being constantly demoted and re-promoted.

=== Late life ===
In 764, Emperor Daizong conferred the title of Duke of Lu (魯公) on Yan Zhenqing in recognition of his firm loyalty to the government and bravery during the An Lushan Rebellion. However, his unbending character was resented by the incumbent Grand Councilor, Lu Qi, and cost him his life.

In 773, Yan Zhenqing and a group of friends began work on compiling the (c. 780) Yunhai Jingyuan, which was a 360-volume rime dictionary of literary words that unfortunately became a lost work.

In 784, Li Xilie, the military governor of Huaixi (淮西節度使), rebelled. Lu Qi had held a grudge against Yan Zhenqing for a long time, so he sent Yan Zhenqing to negotiate with Li Xilie in the hope that Yan Zhenqing would be killed. As expected, Li Xilie tried all means to coax or threaten Yan Zhenqing to surrender, but Yan Zhenqing never wavered. According to legend, Li Xilie set up a fire in the courtyard and told Yan Zhengqing he would be burnt to death if he did not surrender. Yet, Yan Zhenqing did not show the slightest fear and walked towards the fire determinedly. Li Xilie could not help but to show respect to him, and on 23 August, Yan Zhenqing was secretly strangled at the Longxing Temple (龍興寺) in Caizhou, Henan.

Upon hearing of his death, Emperor Daizong closed the assembly for five days and conferred the posthumous title Wenzhong (文忠) on Yan Zhenqing on 2 March 785, along with the posthumous position of situ. He was also widely mourned by the army and the people, and a temple was constructed to commemorate him. In the Song dynasty, the temple was moved to modern Shandong and from then on became a key tourist attraction.

== Calligraphic achievement ==
Yan Zhenqing is popularly held as the only calligrapher who paralleled Wang Xizhi, the "calligraphy sage" (書聖). He specialized in the regular (kaishu 楷書) and cursive (caoshu 草書) scripts, though he also mastered other styles. His style of regular script, often called Yan script (Yanti 顏體), brought Chinese calligraphy to a new realm, emphasizing strength, boldness, and grandness. Like most of the master calligraphers, Yan Zhenqing learned his skill from various calligraphers, and the development of his personal style can be basically divided into three stages.

=== Early period ===
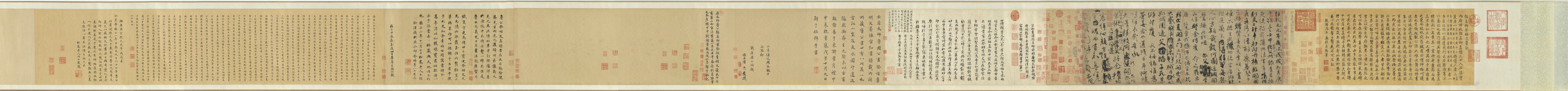
Draft of a Requiem to My Nephew, 758

Most calligraphers agree Yan Zhenqing's early stage lasted until his fifties. During these years, Yan Zhenqing tried out different techniques and started to develop his personal genre. When he was young, he studied calligraphy under the famous calligraphers Zhang Xu and Chu Suiliang. Zhang Xu was skilled in Cao Script, which emphasizes the overall composition and flow; Chu Suiliang, on the other hand, was renowned for his graceful and refined Kai Script. Yan Zhenqing also drew inspiration from the Wei Bei (魏碑) Style, which originated from Northern nomad minorities and focused on strength and simplicity.

In 752, he wrote one of his best-known pieces,

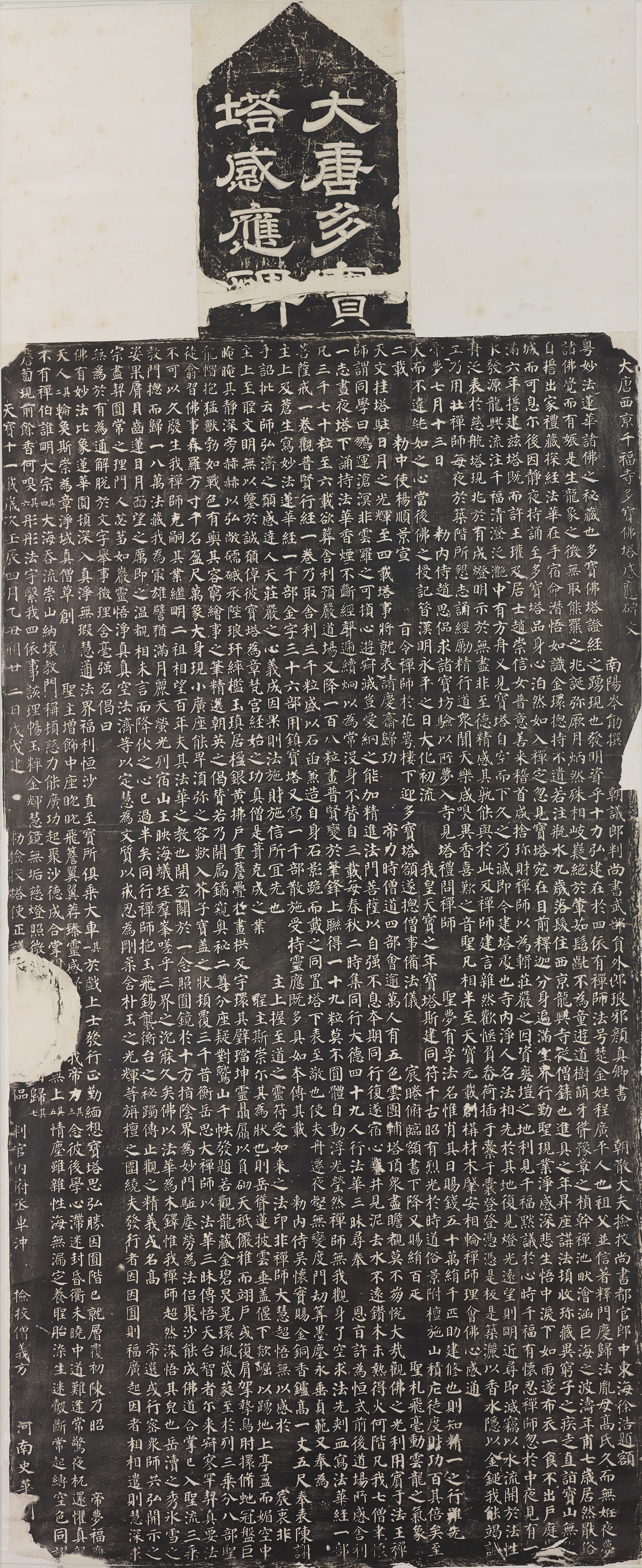

(多寶塔碑). The stele has 34 lines, each containing 66 characters, and it was written for Emperor Xuanzong who at the time was an extremely pious Buddhist. The style of the calligraphy was close to that of the early Tang calligraphers, who emphasized elegance and "fancifulness"; yet it also pursued composure and firmness in its brush strokes, structuring characters on powerful frames with tender management on brushline.  In 758, he also wrote the influential calligraphy piece Draft of a Requiem to My Nephew Archived 2016-06-24 at the Wayback Machine (祭姪文稿).

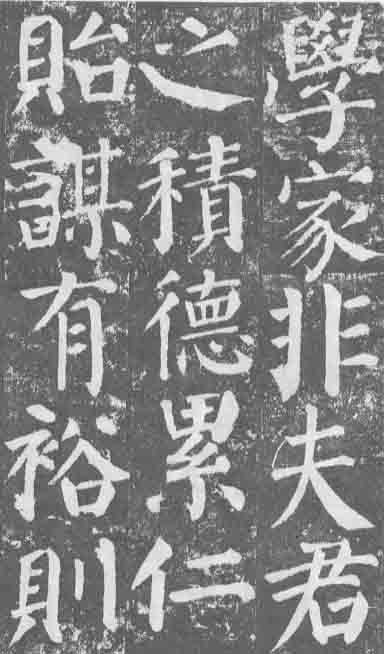
Part of Yan Qinli Stele, Yan Zhenqing's masterpiece (the stele is on permanent display in Bei Lin, Xi'an)

=== Consolidating period ===
This period ranges from Yan Zhenqing's fifties to sixty-five. During these years, he wrote some famous pieces like Guojia Miao Stele (郭傢廟碑) and Magu Shan Xiantan Ji (痲姑山仙墰記). Having experienced the An Lushan Rebellion and frequent vicissitudes in his civil career, Yan Zhenqing's style was maturing. He increased waist force while wielding the brush, and blended techniques from the zhuan (篆) and li (隷) Scripts into his own style, making the start and ending of his brushline gentler. For individual strokes, he adopted the rule of “thin horizontal and thick vertical strokes”; strokes’ widths were varied to show the curvature and flow, and the dots and oblique strokes were finished with sharp edges. For character structure, Yan style displays squared shape and modest arrangement, with spacious center portion and tight outer strokes; this structure resembles more the more dated Zhuan and Li Scripts. From the point of view of spacing, his characters are compact vertically, leaving relatively more space in between lines. Hence, the emerging Yan style had abandoned the sumptuous trend of early Tang calligraphers: it is rather upright, muscular, fitting, rich and controlled; compared to the style of the early Tang which was sloped, feminine, pretty, slim and capricious.

=== Consummating period ===
In the ten years before his death, Yan Zhenqing's calligraphy accomplishment peaked. His style was now established and he continuously improved on each of his works, and completed his magnum opus, the Yan Qinli Stele (顏勤禮碑). At this stage, he was able to fully exhibit his style at will even through a single stroke, and liveliness and passion bubbles under his modest and stately style. He also wrote A Poem to General Pei (裴將軍詩), which was revolutionary for his time, as multiple script styles were presented within the same work.

== Influence ==
Yan Zhenqing's style assimilated the essence of the previous five hundred years. Almost all the calligraphers after him were more or less influenced by him. In his contemporary period, another great master calligrapher, Liu Gongquan, studied under him. The much-respected Five-Dynasty Period calligrapher, Yang Ningshi (楊凝式) thoroughly inherited Yan Zhenqing's style and made it even bolder.

The trend of imitating Yan Zhenqing peaked during the Song dynasty. The "Four Grand Masters of the Song" – Su Shi, Huang Tingjian (黃庭堅), Mi Fu (米芾), Cai Xiang – all studied the Yan Style; Su Shi even claimed Yan Zhenqing's calligraphy to be "peerless" throughout history.

After the Song, the popularity of Yan Zhenqing declined slightly, as calligraphers tended towards more abstract ways of expression. However, he still held important status, and many renowned calligraphers, such as Zhao Mengfu (趙孟頫) and Dong Qichang (董其昌) are said to have been inspired by Yan Zhenqing.

In contemporary China, the leading calligraphers like Sha Menghai (沙孟海) and Shen Yinmo conducted extended research on the Yan style, which then regained its popularity.

== Relevant books ==
The Upright Brush: Yan Zhenqing's Calligraphy and Song Literati Politics

== See also ==
- Tang dynasty art
- Tang dynasty
- An Shi Rebellion
