= Ouyang Xun =

Chinese calligrapher, politician, and writer of the early Tang dynasty

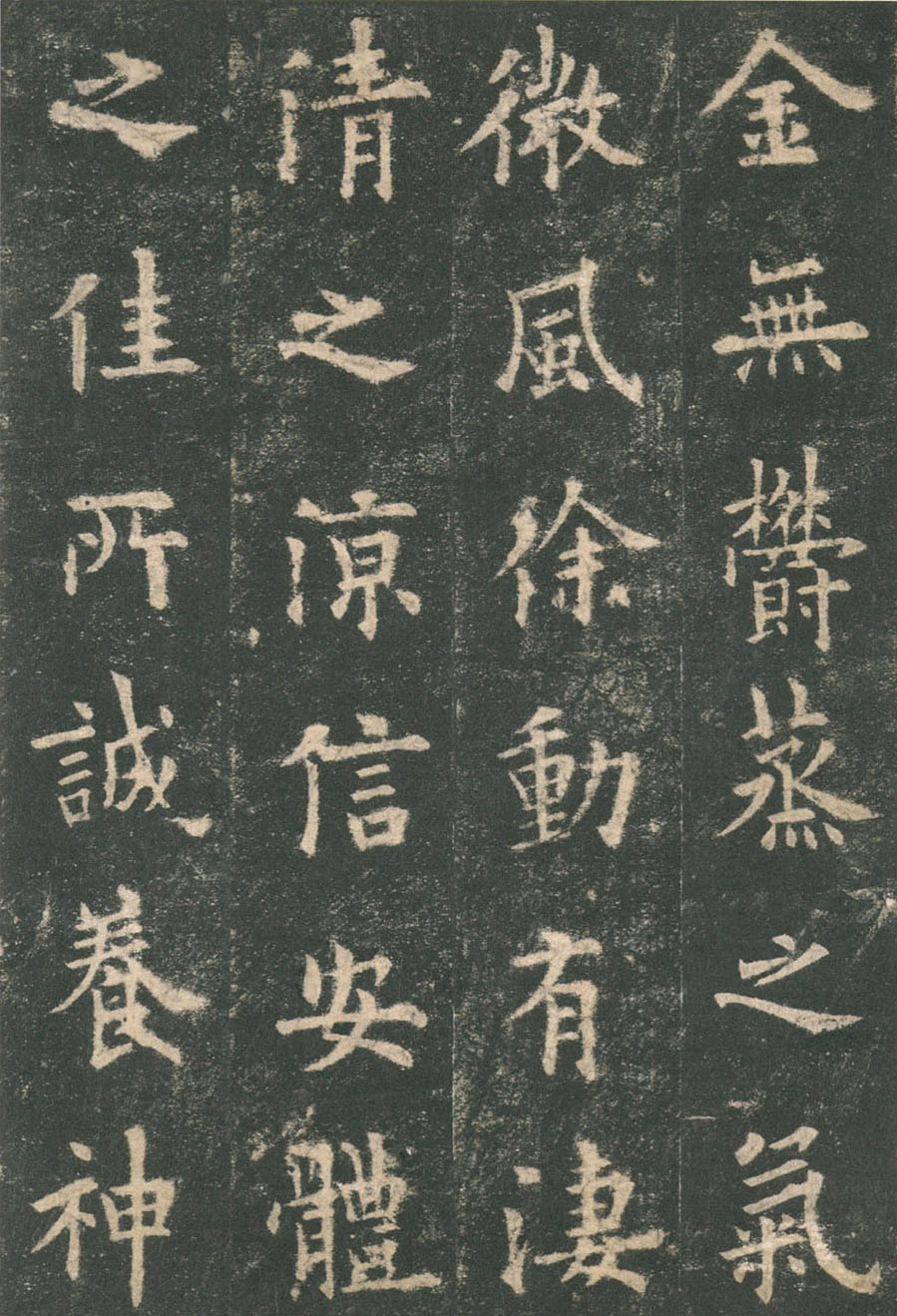
Copy of a text by Ouyang Xun

Ouyang Xun (Chinese: 歐陽詢; pinyin: Ōuyáng Xún; Wade–Giles: Ou-yang Hsün; 557–641), courtesy name Xinben (Chinese: 信本; pinyin: Xìn běn; Wade–Giles: Hsin-pên), was a Chinese calligrapher, politician, and writer of the early Tang dynasty. He was born in Changsha to a family of government officials and died in modern Anhui province.

== Achievements ==
He was a talented student who read widely in the classics. He served under the Sui dynasty in 611 as Imperial Doctor. He served under the Tang dynasty as censor and scholar at the Hongwen Academy. There he taught calligraphy. He was a principal contributor to the Yiwen Leiju.

He became the Imperial Calligrapher and inscribed several major imperial steles. He was good at regular script and his most famous work is the Stele in the Jiucheng Palace. He was considered a cultured scholar and a government official. Along with Yu Shinan, Xue Ji, and Chu Suiliang he became known as one of the Four Great Calligraphers of the Early Tang.

He notably wrote the inscription of the Kaiyuan Tongbao cash coin which became one of the most influential coins in Chinese history, this coin also influenced the calligraphic styles of other coinages in Japan, Sogdia, and Vietnam.

The words in the logo of the Japanese newspaper Asahi Shimbun was extracted from Ouyang's work Zongsheng Temple Inscription.

== Allusion in literature ==
Ouyang was historically known for his legendary monkey-like ugliness and almost supernatural intellect. These attributes were lampooned in an anonymous late 7th-century tale called “A Supplement to Jiang Zong’s Biography of a White Ape” (Bu Jiang Zong Baiyuan Zhuan, 補江總白猿傳). It tells how the beautiful young wife of General Ouyang He (歐陽紇, 538–570), Ouyang Xun's historical father, is kidnapped by a seemingly invisible force while he is engaged in conquering minority groups of the south lands. The general and his men scour the surrounding area for hundreds of miles before discovering a mountain where she and other women are being kept by a magic white ape (baiyuan, 白猿). The captives caution that his soldiers are no match for the powerful primate, and so the ladies devise a plan to get him drunk and incapacitate him long enough for a killing blow to be dealt. With their help, the general manages to fell the beast with a well-placed sword strike below the navel, his only weak spot. Before dying, the ape reveals the general's wife is pregnant and begs him not to kill the child. Ouyang subsequently returns to the north with his wife, the other women, and the monster's priceless treasures. The tale ends with the birth of an unnamed son a year later, thus implying Ouyang Xun was the unnatural offspring of the general's wife and the magic white ape.

== Bibliography ==
Jue Chen, "A Supplement to Jiang Zong’s Biography of a White Ape," Renditions, 49 (1998): 76–85.
