= Yi =

Yi or YI may refer to:

== Philosophic principle ==
- Yi (philosophy) (义; 義, righteousness, justice) among the Three Fundamental Bonds and Five Constant Virtues

== Ethnic groups ==
- Dongyi, the Eastern Yi, or Tung-yi (Chinese: 夷, Yí), ancient peoples who lived east of the Zhongguo in ancient China
- Yi people (Chinese: 彝, Yí; Vietnamese: Lô Lô), an ethnic group in modern China, Vietnam, and Thailand

== Language ==
- Yi (Cyrillic), the letter of the Ukrainian alphabet written "Ї" and "ї"
- Yi language or the Nuosu language spoken by the Yi people of China
- Yi script, either of two scripts used to write the Yi languages
- Yiddish (ISO 639-1 language code: yi), the historical language of the Ashkenazi Jews
- Yi, an obsolete Japanese kana

== Mythology and religion ==
- Yi the Archer or Houyi, a heroic archer and hunter in Chinese mythology
- Yi (husbandman), also known as Boyi or Bo Yi, a heroic user of fire and government minister in Chinese mythology

== People ==
=== Surname ===
- Yi (surname 易)
- Yi (surname 伊)
- Yi (Korean surname) (李,이), including
  - House of Yi, household of Joseon and the Korean Empire
  - Yi Sun-sin (1545–1598), Korean admiral

=== Given name ===
- Lu Yi (disambiguation), several persons
- Wu Yi (politician) (born 1938), Vice Premier of China

== Places ==
- Yi County (disambiguation), two counties in China
- Yí River, a river in Uruguay
- Yi River (Henan), a river in China
- Serbia and Montenegro (FIPS country code: YI), a country in Southeast Europe

== Other uses ==
- Yi (dinosaur)
- Yi (drinkware) (彝), former name for the zun, a traditional bronze drinkware of ancient China
- Yi (prefix symbol), the prefix symbol of the binary unit prefix yobi, representing 2^{80}, the equivalent of the decimal prefix yotta- (Y)
- Yi (simplified Chinese: 亿; traditional Chinese: 億), an East Asian counting unit meaning 100,000,000
- Yi (vessel) (匜), a different kind of bronze vessel used in traditional rituals in ancient China
- YI Technology, a Chinese company that manufactures cameras and computer vision technologies
- I Ching, or Yijing, ancient Chinese text
- "Yi" and "iMi", songs by American indie folk band Bon Iver
- Iraq (aircraft registration prefix YI)
- Yì (翼) or Wings, a Chinese constellation

== See also ==
- Yii
- Yi Prefecture (disambiguation)
- Yee (disambiguation)
