= EAY =

EAY or Eay can refer to:

- Aero Airlines, a regional airline based in Estonia from 2000 to 2008, by ICAO code
- Eay Simay (born 1991), a Paralympic powerlifter from Laos
- Empresa Aeronáutica Ypiranga, a Brazilian aircraft manufacturer from 1931 to 1942
- Xi'an North railway station, a train station in Xi'an, Shaanxi province, China, by telegraph code
- Effective Annual Yield, a business term; see List of business and finance abbreviations#E

== See also ==
- East Asian Youth Games (EAYG), a recurring multi-sport youth event in East Asia
- EA (disambiguation)
- EY (disambiguation)
- -ey (disambiguation)
- Ay (disambiguation)
