= Guan Yu =

Chinese general and folk hero (died 220)

- 關羽
- A portrait of Guan Yu in the Sancai Tuhui

General of the Vanguard (前將軍)
- In office 219 – 220
- Monarchs: Liu Bei (King of Hanzhong); Emperor Xian of Han

General Who Defeats Bandits (盪寇將軍; under Liu Bei)
- In office c. 211 – 219
- Monarch: Emperor Xian of Han

Administrator of Xiangyang (襄陽太守; under Liu Bei)
- In office c. 211 – 219
- Monarch: Emperor Xian of Han

Lieutenant-general (偏將軍)
- In office 200 – c. 211
- Monarch: Emperor Xian of Han

Personal details
- Born: Unknown Xie County, Hedong Commandery, Han dynasty (present-day Yuncheng, Shanxi)
- Died: January or February 220 (Note: The Zizhi Tongjian recorded that Guan Yu was captured and executed in the 12th month of the 24th year of the Jian'an era of the reign of Emperor Xian of Han. This month corresponds to 23 January to 21 February 220 in the Julian and the proleptic Gregorian calendars.) Linju County, Xiangyang Commandery, Han dynasty (present-day Nanzhang County, Hubei)
- Children: Guan Ping; Guan Xing; an unnamed daughter
- Occupation: General
- Courtesy name: Yunchang (雲長)
- Posthumous name: Marquis Zhuangmou (壯繆侯)
- Peerage: Marquis of Hanshou Village (漢壽亭侯)
- Deity names: Guan Di (關帝; "Emperor Guan"); Guan Gong (關公; "Lord Guan"); Guan Sheng Di Jun (關聖帝君; "Holy Ruler Deity Guan"); Sangharama Bodhisattva (伽藍菩薩)
- Other names: Guan Er Ye (關二爺; "Lord Guan the Second"); Guan Er Ge; 關二哥; "Guan the Second Brother"); Mei Ran Gong (美髯公; "Lord of the Magnificent Beard"); Changsheng (長生); Shouchang (壽長); See this section for more posthumous titles

Guan Yu
- Guan's name in traditional (top) and simplified (bottom) Chinese characters
- Traditional Chinese: 關羽
- Simplified Chinese: 关羽
Transcriptions
Standard Mandarin
- Hanyu Pinyin: Guān Yǔ
- Bopomofo: ㄍㄨㄢ ㄩˇ
- Wade–Giles: Kuan^{1} Yü^{3}
- Yale Romanization: Gwān Yǔ
- IPA: [kwán ỳ]
Wu
- Suzhounese: Kue^{1} Yu^{6}
Yue: Cantonese
- Yale Romanization: Gwāan Yúh
- Jyutping: Gwaan1 Jyu5
- IPA: [kʷan˥ jy˩˧]
Southern Min
- Hokkien POJ: Koan Ú
- Tâi-lô: Kuan Ú
Middle Chinese
- Middle Chinese: kwaen hjuX
Old Chinese
- Baxter–Sagart (2014): *[k]ˁro[n] [ɢ]ʷ(r)aʔ

courtesy name
- Traditional Chinese: 長生
- Simplified Chinese: 长生
Transcriptions
Standard Mandarin
- Hanyu Pinyin: Chángshēng
- IPA: [ʈʂʰǎŋ.ʂə̌ŋ]
Yue: Cantonese
- Jyutping: Coeng4 Sang1
- IPA: [tsʰœŋ˩.sɐŋ˥]
Middle Chinese
- Middle Chinese: drjang sraeng
Old Chinese
- Baxter–Sagart (2014): *Cə-[N]-traŋ sreŋ

Guan Yu ([kwán ỳ]; d. January or February 220), courtesy name Yunchang, was a Chinese military general under warlord Liu Bei during the late Eastern Han dynasty. Together with Zhang Fei, he was among Liu Bei's earliest followers. After a brief period in Cao Cao's service in 200, during which he killed Yan Liang at the Battle of Boma, Guan Yu returned to Liu Bei. He later commanded Liu Bei's forces in Jing Province.

In 219, Guan Yu attacked Cao Cao's forces at Fancheng, defeated and captured Yu Jin, and killed Pang De. While the campaign continued, Sun Quan ended his alliance with Liu Bei and sent Lü Meng to seize Liu Bei's territories in Jing Province. Guan Yu withdrew, was captured by Sun Quan's forces, and was executed with his son Guan Ping in early 220.

Guan Yu was later worshipped in Chinese folk religion, Taoism, Chinese Buddhism, and popular Confucian traditions. Storytelling, drama, and the 14th-century novel Romance of the Three Kingdoms further developed his image as a model of loyalty and martial courage. In religious contexts he is commonly called "Lord Guan" (Guan Gong) or "Emperor Guan" (Guan Di).

== Historical sources ==
The authoritative historical source on Guan Yu's life is the Records of the Three Kingdoms written by Chen Shou in the third century. During the fifth century, Pei Songzhi annotated the Records of the Three Kingdoms by incorporating information from other sources into Chen Shou's original work and adding his personal comments. Some alternative texts used in the annotations to Guan Yu's biography include: Shu Ji (Records of Shu), by Wang Yin; Wei Shu (Book of Wei), by Wang Chen, Xun Yi and Ruan Ji; Jiang Biao Zhuan, by Yu Pu; Fu Zi, by Fu Xuan; Dianlüe, by Yu Huan; Wu Li (History of Wu), by Hu Chong; and Chronicles of Huayang, by Chang Qu.

== Physical appearance ==
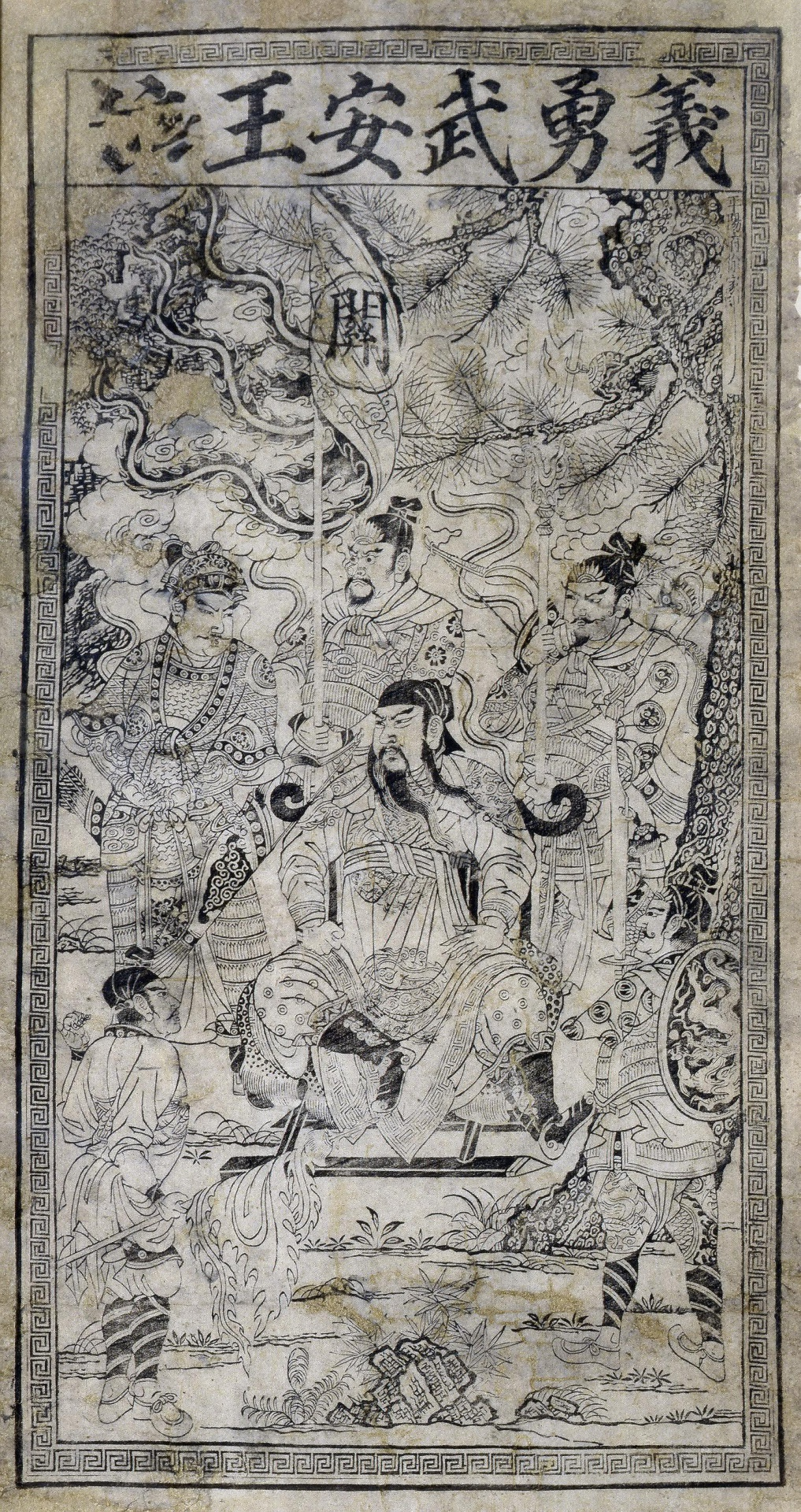
Woodblock print of Guan Yu found in Khara-Khoto. One of the earliest illustrations of Guan Yu discovered.

No explicit descriptions of Guan Yu's physical appearance exist in historical records. However, the Records of the Three Kingdoms recorded that Zhuge Liang once referred to Guan Yu as having a "peerless beard". (Note: The "peerless beard" referred to Guan Yu because Guan Yu had a beautiful beard. (Note: (羽美鬚髯，故亮謂之髯。) Sanguozhi vol. 36.)))

Traditionally, Guan Yu is portrayed as a red-faced warrior with a long, lush beard. The idea of his red face may have been derived from a description of him in Chapter 1 of the 14th-century historical novel Romance of the Three Kingdoms, where the following passage appears:

"Xuande took a look at the man, who stood at a height of nine chi, (Note: In the Eastern Han dynasty, one chi was approximately 23.1 cm, nine chi was approximately 2.079 metres (6 feet, 9.85 inches).) and had a two chi (Note: In the Eastern Han dynasty, one chi was approximately 23.1 cm, two chi was approximately 46.2 cm (≈18 inches)) long beard; his face was of the colour of a dark zao, (Note: His face had a dark red hue to it, like the colour of dark jujube fruit.) with lips that were red and plump; his eyes were like those of a crimson phoenix, (Note: The corners of his eyes were upturned) and his eyebrows resembled reclining silkworms. (Note: They were long and tapered.) He had a dignified air and looked quite majestic."

Alternatively, the idea of his red face could have been borrowed from opera representation, where red faces represented loyalty and righteousness. In illustrations of Romance of the Three Kingdoms, Guan Yu is traditionally depicted wearing a green robe over his body armour.

In Romance of the Three Kingdoms, Guan Yu's weapon was a guandao named Green Dragon Crescent Blade, which resembled a glaive and was said to weigh 82 catties (about 49 kilograms (108 lb)).

== Early life and career ==
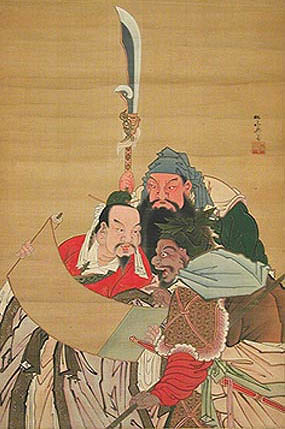
Liu Bei (left), Guan Yu (back), and Zhang Fei (right) in an illustration by Japanese painter Sakurai Sekkan (1715–90)

Guan Yu was from Xie County (解縣, also called Hai County), Hedong Commandery, which is present-day Yuncheng, Shanxi. His original courtesy name was Changsheng (長生). (Note: (關羽字雲長，本字長生，河東解人也。) Sanguozhi vol. 36.) He was very studious, and was interested in the ancient history book Zuo zhuan and could fluently recite lines from it. (Note: (斯人长而好学，读左传略皆上口[...]) Sanguozhi vol. 54.) (Note: (江表傳云：羽好左氏傳，諷誦略皆上口。) Jiang Biao Zhuan annotation in Sanguozhi vol. 36.) He fled from his hometown for unknown reasons (Note: While the term 亡命 (wáng mìng) implies criminal activity in modern use, during the Eastern Han dynasty it merely referred to someone who cancelled his registration in the local registers by fleeing his county of origin.) and went to Zhuo Commandery. When the Yellow Turban Rebellion broke out in the 180s, Guan Yu and Zhang Fei joined a volunteer militia formed by Liu Bei, and they assisted a colonel Zou Jing in suppressing the revolt. (Note: (亡命奔涿郡。先主於鄉里合徒衆，而羽與張飛為之禦侮。) Sanguozhi vol. 36.) (Note: (靈帝末，黃巾起，州郡各舉義兵，先主率其屬從校尉鄒靖討黃巾賊有功，除安喜尉。) Sanguozhi vol. 32.) Guan Yu and Zhang Fei were known as stalwart and strong men, which made them talented fighters.

When Liu Bei was appointed as the Minister (相) of Pingyuan, Guan Yu and Zhang Fei were appointed as Majors of Separate Command (别部司马), each commanding detachments of soldiers under Liu Bei. Liu Bei cherished them as if they were his own brothers and the three of them were as close as brothers to the point of sharing the same room, sleeping on the same mat and eating from the same pot. Zhang Fei and Guan Yu protected Liu Bei whenever there were large crowds of people and also stood guard beside him when he sat down at meetings all day long. For their military prowess, they were appraised as the "enemy of ten-thousand". (Note: (嘉言于太祖曰："备有雄才而甚得众心。张飞、关羽者，皆万人之敌也，为之死用。) Sanguozhi vol. 14.) Guan Yu was noted for his kindness towards his soldiers and fealty to Liu Bei akin to family, but had no respect for the gentry and treated them without courtesy. (Note: (关羽与备，义为君臣，恩犹父子。) Sanguozhi vol. 14.) (Note: (羽善待卒伍而骄於士大夫。)Sanguozhi vol. 36.) (Note: (关、张赳赳，出身匡世，扶翼携上，雄壮虎烈。藩屏左右，翻飞电发，济于艰难，赞主洪业，侔迹韩、耿，齐声双德。交待无礼，并致奸 慝，悼惟轻虑，陨身匡国。)Sanguozhi vol. 45.)

== Short service under Cao Cao ==
=== Background ===
Liu Bei and his men followed Cao Cao back to the imperial capital Xu after their victory over Lü Bu at the Battle of Xiapi in 198. About a year later, Liu Bei and his followers escaped from Xu under the pretext of helping Cao Cao lead an army to attack Yuan Shu. Liu Bei went to Xu Province, killed the provincial inspector Che Zhou (車冑), and seized control of the province. He moved to Xiaopei and left Guan Yu in charge of the provincial capital Xiapi. (Note: (先主之襲殺徐州刺史車冑，使羽守下邳城，行太守事，而身還小沛。) Sanguozhi vol. 36.) (Note: (先主據下邳。靈等還，先主乃殺徐州刺史車冑，留關羽守下邳，而身還小沛。) Sanguozhi vol. 32.) (Note: (魏書云：以羽領徐州。) Wei Shu annotation in Sanguozhi vol. 36.)

In 200, Cao Cao led his forces to attack Liu Bei, defeated him and retook Xu Province. Liu Bei fled to northern China and found refuge under Cao Cao's rival Yuan Shao, while Guan Yu was captured by Cao Cao's forces and brought back to Xu. Cao Cao treated Guan Yu respectfully and asked Emperor Xian to appoint Guan Yu as a Lieutenant-General (偏將軍). (Note: (建安五年，曹公東征，先主奔袁紹。曹公禽羽以歸，拜為偏將軍，禮之甚厚。) Sanguozhi vol. 36.) (Note: (五年，曹公東征先主，先主敗績。曹公盡收其衆，虜先主妻子，并禽關羽以歸。) Sanguozhi vol. 32.)

=== Battle of Boma ===
Later that year, Yuan Shao sent his general Yan Liang to lead an army to attack Cao Cao's garrison at Boma (白馬; near present-day Hua County, Henan), which was defended by Liu Yan (劉延). Cao Cao sent Zhang Liao and Guan Yu to lead the vanguard to engage the enemy. In the midst of battle, Guan Yu recognised Yan Liang's parasol so he charged towards Yan Liang, decapitated him and returned with his head. Yan Liang's men could not stop him. With Yan Liang's death, the siege on Boma was lifted. On Cao Cao's recommendation, Emperor Xian awarded Guan Yu the peerage of "Marquis (Note: The peerage of marquis was divided into three grades during the Han dynasty and Three Kingdoms period. These are, in ascending order of prestige, tinghou (亭侯; village marquis), xianghou (郷侯; district marquis) and xianhou (縣侯; county marquis). Guan Yu's was the first.) of Hanshou Village" (漢壽亭侯). (Note: (紹遣大將軍顏良攻東郡太守劉延於白馬，曹公使張遼及羽為先鋒擊之。羽望見良麾蓋，策馬刺良於萬衆之中，斬其首還，紹諸將莫能當者，遂解白馬圍。曹公即表封羽為漢壽亭侯。) Sanguozhi vol. 36.)

=== Leaving Cao Cao ===
Although Cao Cao admired Guan Yu's character, he also sensed that Guan Yu had no intention of serving under him for long. He told Zhang Liao, "Why don't you make use of your friendship with Guan Yu to find out what he wants?" When Zhang Liao asked him, Guan Yu replied, "I am aware that Lord Cao treats me very generously. However, I have also received many favours from General Liu and I have sworn to follow him until I die. I cannot break my oath. I will leave eventually, so maybe you can help me convey my message to Lord Cao." Zhang Liao did so, and Cao Cao was even more impressed with Guan Yu. (Note: (初，曹公壯羽為人，而察其心神無乆留之意，謂張遼曰：「卿試以情問之。」旣而遼以問羽，羽歎曰：「吾極知曹公待我厚，然吾受劉將軍厚恩，誓以共死，不可背之。吾終不留，吾要當立效以報曹公乃去。」遼以羽言報曹公，曹公義之。) Sanguozhi vol. 36.) The Fu Zi gave a slightly different account of this incident. It recorded that Zhang Liao faced a dilemma of whether or not to convey Guan Yu's message to Cao Cao: if he did, Cao Cao might execute Guan Yu; if he did not, he would be failing in his service to Cao Cao. He sighed, "Lord Cao is my superior and he is like a father to me, while Guan Yu is like a brother to me." He eventually decided to tell Cao Cao. Cao Cao said, "A subject who serves his lord but doesn't forget his origins is truly a man of righteousness. When do you think he will leave?" Zhang Liao replied, "Guan Yu has received favours from Your Excellency. He will most probably leave after he has repaid your kindness." (Note: (傅子曰：遼欲白太祖，恐太祖殺羽，不白，非事君之道,乃歎曰：「公，君父也；羽，兄弟耳。」遂白之。太祖曰：「事君不忘其本，天下義士也。度何時能去？」遼曰：「羽受公恩，必立效報公而後去也。」) Fu Zi annotation in Sanguozhi vol. 36.)

After Guan Yu slew Yan Liang and lifted the siege on Baima, Cao Cao knew that he would leave soon so he gave Guan Yu greater rewards. Guan Yu sealed up all the gifts he received from Cao Cao, wrote a farewell letter, and headed towards Yuan Shao's territory to find Liu Bei. Cao Cao's subordinates wanted to pursue Guan Yu, but Cao Cao stopped them and said, "He's just doing his duty to his lord. There's no need to pursue him." (Note: (及羽殺顏良，曹公知其必去，重加賞賜。羽盡封其所賜，拜書告辭，而奔先主於袁軍。左右欲追之，曹公曰：「彼各為其主，勿追也。」) Sanguozhi vol. 36.)

Pei Songzhi commented on this as follows: "Cao Cao admired Guan Yu's character even though he knew that Guan Yu would not remain under him. He did not send his men to pursue Guan Yu when Guan Yu left, so as to allow Guan Yu to fulfil his allegiance (to Liu Bei). If he was not as magnanimous as a great warlord should be, how would he allow this to happen? This was an example of Cao Cao's goodness." (Note: (臣松之以為曹公知羽不留而心嘉其志，去不遣追以成其義，自非有王霸之度，孰能至於此乎？斯實曹氏之休美。) Pei Songzhi's annotation in Sanguozhi vol. 36.)

== Returning to Liu Bei ==
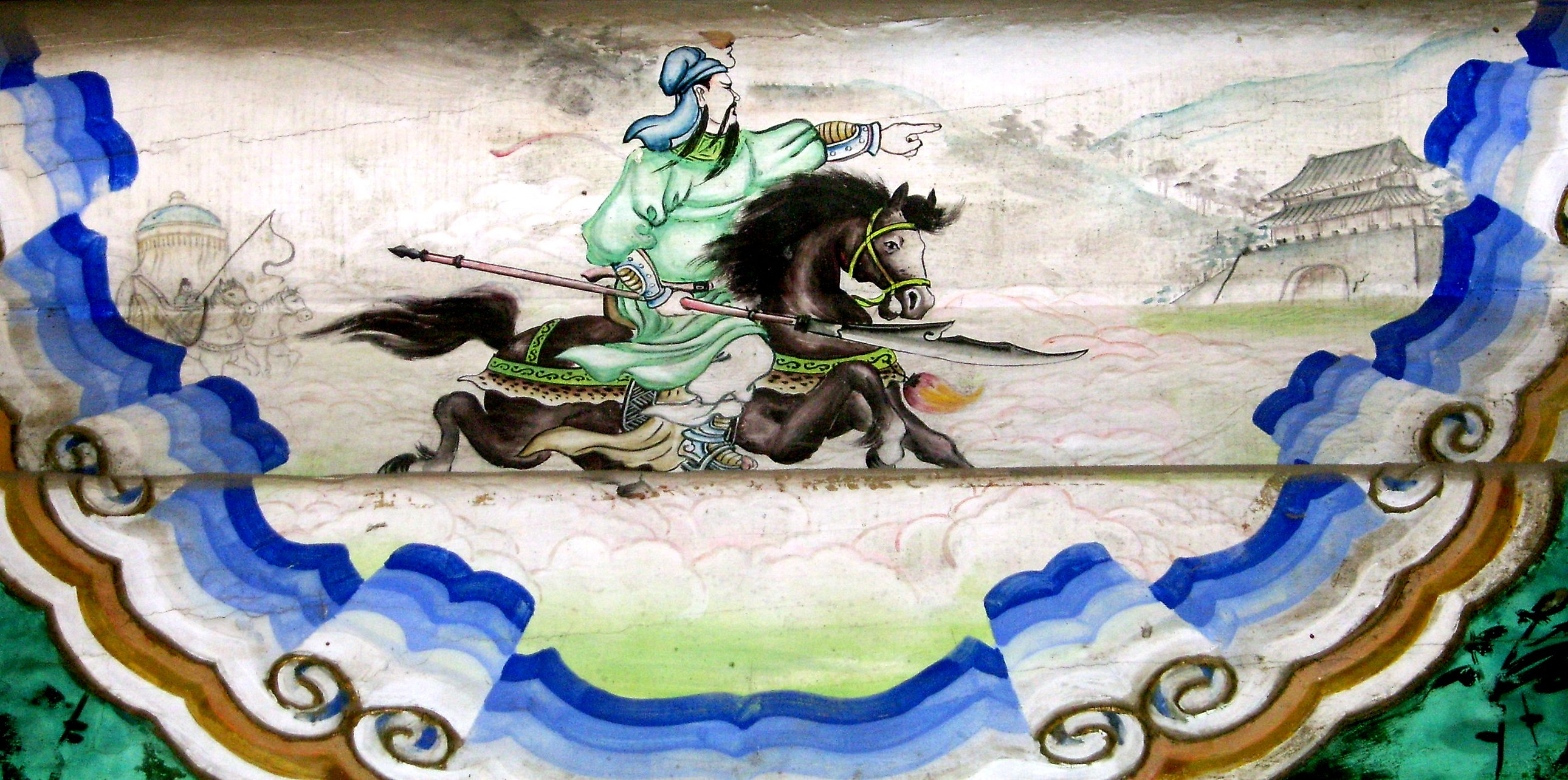
A mural of Guan Yu's "Riding Alone for Thousands of Miles" (千里走單騎) in the Summer Palace, Beijing.

When Cao Cao and Yuan Shao clashed at the Battle of Guandu in 200, Yuan sent Liu Bei to contact Liu Pi (劉辟), a Yellow Turban rebel chief in Runan (汝南), and assist Liu Pi in attacking the imperial capital Xu while Cao Cao was away at Guandu. Guan Yu reunited with Liu Bei around this time. Liu Bei and Liu Pi were defeated by Cao Cao's general Cao Ren, after which Liu Bei returned to Yuan Shao. Liu Bei secretly planned to leave Yuan Shao, so he pretended to persuade Yuan Shao to form an alliance with Liu Biao, the Governor of Jing Province. Yuan Shao sent Liu Bei to contact another rebel leader, Gong Du (共都/龔都), in Runan, where they gathered a few thousand soldiers. Cao Cao turned back and attacked Runan after scoring a decisive victory over Yuan Shao at Guandu. Liu Bei fled south and found shelter under Liu Biao, who put him in charge of Xinye at the northern border of Jing Province. Guan Yu followed Liu Bei to Xinye. (Note: (曹公與袁紹相拒於官渡，汝南黃巾劉辟等叛曹公應紹。紹遣先主將兵與辟等略許下。關羽亡歸先主。曹公遣曹仁將兵擊先主，先主還紹軍，陰欲離紹，乃說紹南連荊州牧劉表。紹遣先主將本兵復至汝南，與賊龔都等合，衆數千人。 ... 曹公旣破紹，自南擊先主。先主遣麋笁、孫乾與劉表相聞，表自郊迎，以上賔禮待之，益其兵，使屯新野。) Sanguozhi vol. 32.) (Note: (從先主就劉表。) Sanguozhi vol. 36.)

== Battle of Red Cliffs and aftermath ==
Liu Biao died in 208 and was succeeded by his younger son, Liu Cong, who surrendered Jing Province to Cao Cao when the latter started a campaign that year with the aim of wiping out opposing forces in southern China. Liu Bei evacuated Xinye together with his followers and they headed towards Xiakou, which was guarded by Liu Biao's elder son Liu Qi and independent of Cao Cao's control. Along the journey, Liu Bei divided his party into two groups – one led by Guan Yu which would sail along the river towards Jiangling; another led by Liu Bei which would travel on land. Cao Cao sent 5,000 elite cavalry to pursue Liu Bei's group and they caught up with them at Changban, where the Battle of Changban broke out. Liu Bei and his remaining followers managed to escape from Cao Cao's forces and reach Han Ford (漢津), where Guan Yu's group picked them up and they sailed to Xiakou together. (Note: (聞先主已過，曹公將精騎五千急追之，一日一夜行三百餘里，及於當陽之長坂。) Sanguozhi vol. 32.) (Note: (表卒，曹公定荊州，先主自樊將南渡江，別遣羽乘船數百艘會江陵。曹公追至當陽長阪，先主斜趣漢津，適與羽船相值，共至夏口。) Sanguozhi vol. 36.)

In 208, Liu Bei allied with Sun Quan and they defeated Cao Cao at the decisive Battle of Red Cliffs. Cao Cao retreated north after his defeat and left Cao Ren behind to defend Jing Province. (Note: (孫權遣兵佐先主拒曹公，曹公引軍退歸。先主收江南諸郡，乃封拜元勳，以羽為襄陽太守、盪寇將軍，駐江北。) Sanguozhi vol. 36.) During the Battle of Jiangling, Guan Yu was stationed at the northern routes to block Cao Ren's supply lines via infiltration. Li Tong engaged Guan Yu, attempting to support Cao Ren's forces, but died from illness during the campaign. (Note: (刘备与周瑜围曹仁於江陵，别遣关羽绝北道。通率众击之，下马拔鹿角入围，且战且前，以迎仁军，勇冠诸将。通道得病薨，时年四十二。) Sanguozhi vol. 18.) Xu Huang and Man Chong also engaged with Guan Yu in Hanjin (漢津) in order to support Cao Ren against Zhou Yu. (Note: (從征荊州，別屯樊，討中廬、臨沮、宜城賊。又與滿寵討關羽於漢津，與曹仁擊周瑜於江陵。) Sanguozhi vol. 17.) Finally, Yue Jin, stationed in Xiangyang, defeated Guan Yu and Su Fei (蘇非) and drove them away. (Note: (後從平荊州，留屯襄陽，擊關羽、蘇非等，皆走之， ...) Sanguozhi vol. 17.) After seizing and pacifying the various commanderies in southern Jing Province, Liu Bei appointed Guan Yu as the Administrator (太守) of Xiangyang and General Who Defeats Bandits (盪寇將軍), and ordered him to station at the north of the Yangtze River.

== Guarding Jing Province ==
Between 212 and 214, Liu Bei started a campaign to seize control of Yi Province from the provincial governor Liu Zhang. Most of Liu Bei's subordinates participated in the campaign, while Guan Yu remained behind to guard and oversee Liu Bei's territories in Jing Province. (Note: (先主西定益州，拜羽董督荊州事。) Sanguozhi vol. 36.)

=== Sun-Liu territorial dispute ===
During the mid 210s, a territorial dispute broke out between Liu Bei and Sun Quan in southern Jing Province. According to an earlier arrangement, Liu Bei "borrowed" southern Jing Province from Sun Quan to serve as a temporary base; he would have to return the territories to Sun Quan once he found another base. After Liu Bei seized control of Yi Province, Sun Quan asked him to return three commanderies but Liu Bei refused. Sun Quan then sent his general Lü Meng to lead his forces to seize the three commanderies. In response, Liu Bei ordered Guan Yu to lead troops to stop Lü Meng. (Note: (及羽與肅鄰界，數生狐疑，疆埸紛錯，肅常以歡好撫之。備旣定益州，權求長沙、零、桂，備不承旨，權遣呂蒙率衆進取。備聞，自還公安，遣羽爭三郡。) Sanguozhi vol. 54.) Gan Ning, one of Lü Meng's subordinates, managed to deter Guan Yu from crossing the shallows near Yiyang. The shallows were thus named 'Guan Yu's Shallows' (關羽瀨). (Note: (羽號有三萬人，自擇選銳士五千人，投縣上流十餘里淺瀨，云欲夜涉渡。肅與諸將議。 ... 肅便選千兵益寧，寧乃夜往。羽聞之，住不渡，而結柴營，今遂名此處為關羽瀨。) Sanguozhi vol. 55.) Lu Su (the overall commander of Sun Quan's forces in Jing Province) later invited Guan Yu to attend a meeting to settle the territorial dispute. Around 215, after Cao Cao seized control of Hanzhong Commandery, Liu Bei saw that as a strategic threat to his position in Yi Province so he decided to make peace with Sun Quan and agreed to divide southern Jing Province between his and Sun Quan's domains along the Xiang River. Both sides then withdrew their forces. (Note: (備遂割湘水為界，於是罷軍。) Sanguozhi vol. 54.)

== Battle of Fancheng ==
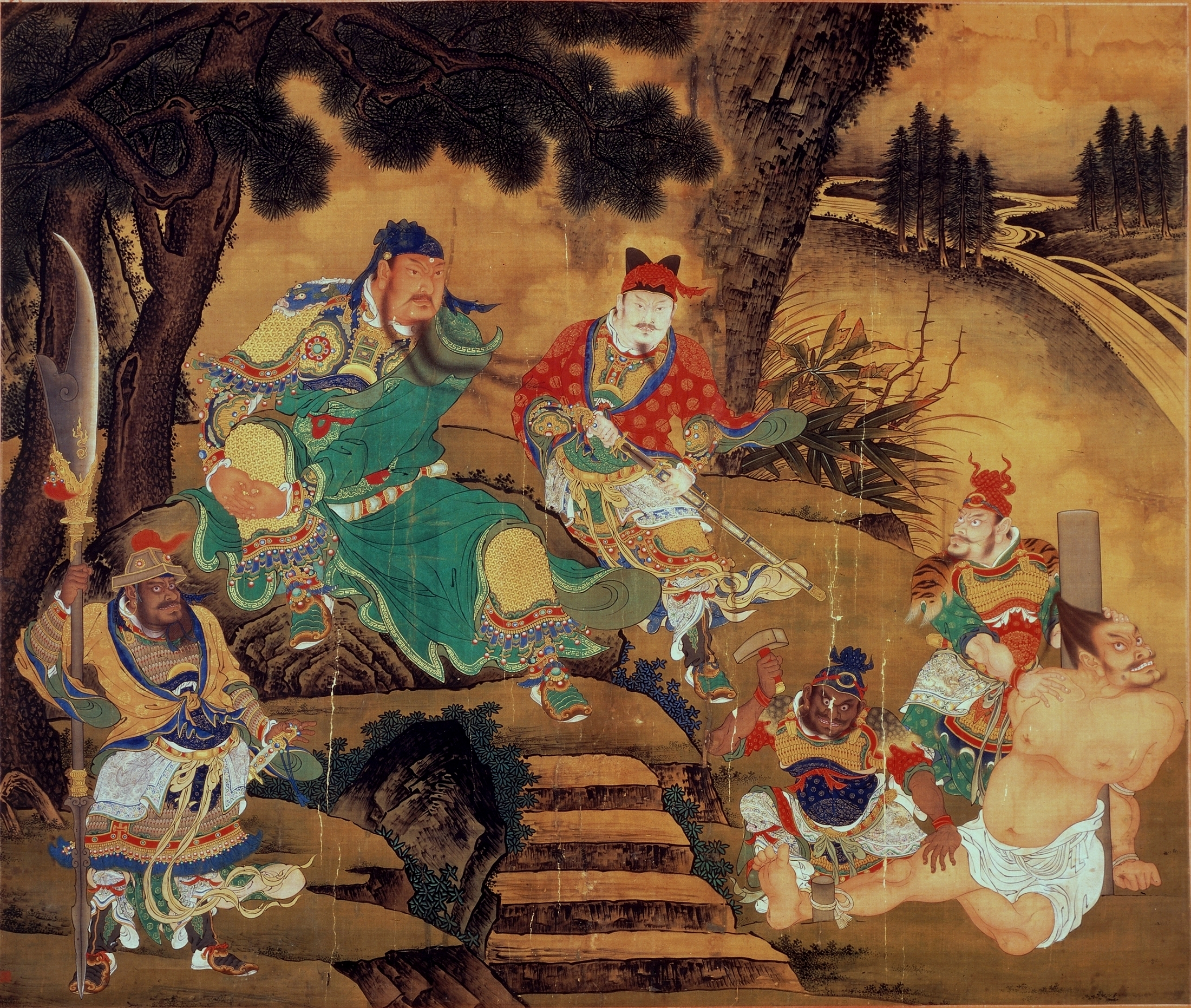
Guan Yu captures Pang De, as depicted in a Ming dynasty painting by Shang Xi, c. 1430.

In 219, Liu Bei emerged victorious in the Hanzhong Campaign against Cao Cao, after which he declared himself "King of Hanzhong" (漢中王). He appointed Guan Yu as General of the Vanguard (前將軍) and bestowed upon him a ceremonial axe. In the same year, Guan Yu led his forces to attack Cao Ren at Fancheng and besiege the fortress. Cao Cao sent Yu Jin to lead reinforcements to help Cao Ren. It was in autumn and there were heavy showers so the Han River overflowed. The flood destroyed Yu Jin's seven armies. Guan Yu had prepared his navy to advance during the flood, and Yu Jin surrendered to Guan Yu while his subordinate Pang De refused and was executed by Guan Yu. Various local officials such as Administrator of Nanxiang Fu Fang and Inspector of Jing Province Hu Xiu defected to Guan Yu. Angered by Cao Cao's forced labor put upon them, rebel peasants and bandits in Liang (梁), Jia (郟) and Luhun (陸渾) also submitted to Guan Yu and received official seals to work as his raiders. Guan Yu's fame spread throughout China. (Note: (二十四年，先主為漢中王，拜羽為前將軍，假節鉞。是歲，羽率衆攻曹仁於樊。曹公遣于禁助仁。秋，大霖雨，漢水汎溢，禁所督七軍皆沒。禁降羽，羽又斬將軍龐德。梁郟、陸渾羣盜或遙受羽印號，為之支黨，羽威震華夏。) Sanguozhi vol. 36.)

The Shu Ji recorded that before Guan Yu embarked on the Fancheng campaign, he dreamt about a boar biting his foot. He told his son Guan Ping, "I am growing weaker this year. I might not even return alive." (Note: (蜀記曰：羽初出軍圍樊，夢豬嚙其足，語子平曰：「吾今年衰矣，然不得還！」) Shu Ji annotation in Sanguozhi vol. 36.)

=== Belittling Sun Quan ===
With Liu Bei gaining Hanzhong as well as the northwest commanderies of Jing: Fangling, Shangyong and Xicheng; and now after Yu Jin's defeat, Cao Cao contemplated relocating the imperial capital from Xu further north into Hebei to avoid Guan Yu, but Sima Yi and Jiang Ji told him that Sun Quan would become restless when he heard of Guan Yu's victory. They suggested to Cao Cao to ally with Sun Quan and get him to help them hinder Guan Yu's advances; in return, Cao Cao would recognise the legitimacy of Sun Quan's claim over the territories in Jiangdong. In this way, the siege on Fancheng would automatically be lifted. Cao Cao heeded their suggestion. Previously, Sun Quan had sent a messenger to meet Guan Yu and propose a marriage between his son and Guan Yu's daughter. However, Guan Yu not only rejected the proposal, but also scolded and humiliated the messenger. Sun Quan was enraged. (Note: (曹公議徙許都以避其銳，司馬宣王、蔣濟以為關羽得志，孫權必不願也。可遣人勸權躡其後，許割江南以封權，則樊圍自解。曹公從之。先是，權遣使為子索羽女，羽罵辱其使，不許婚，權大怒。) Sanguozhi vol. 36.)

=== Encounter with Xu Huang ===
Cao Cao later sent Xu Huang to lead another army to reinforce Cao Ren at Fancheng. Xu Huang broke through Guan Yu's encirclement and routed Guan Yu's forces on the battlefield, thus lifting the siege on Fancheng. (Note: (賊圍頭有屯，又別屯四冢。晃揚聲當攻圍頭屯，而密攻四冢。羽見四冢欲壞，自將步騎五千出戰，晃擊之，退走，遂追陷與俱入圍，破之，或自投沔水死。) Sanguozhi vol. 17.) Guan Yu withdrew his forces after seeing that he could not capture Fancheng. (Note: (而曹公遣徐晃救曹仁，羽不能克，引軍退還。) Sanguozhi vol. 36.) The Shu Ji recorded an incident about Xu Huang encountering Guan Yu on the battlefield. Xu Huang was previously a close friend of Guan Yu. They often chatted about other things apart from military affairs. When they met again at Fancheng, Xu Huang gave an order to his men: "Whoever takes Guan Yu's head will be rewarded with 1,000 jin of gold." A shocked Guan Yu asked Xu Huang, "Brother, what are you talking about?" Xu Huang replied, "This is an affair of the state." (Note: (蜀記曰：羽與晃宿相愛，遙共語，但說平生，不及軍事。須臾，晃下馬宣令：「得關雲長頭，賞金千斤。」羽驚怖，謂晃曰：「大兄，是何言邪！」晃曰：「此國之事耳。」) Shu Ji annotation in Sanguozhi vol. 36.)

== Losing Jing Province ==
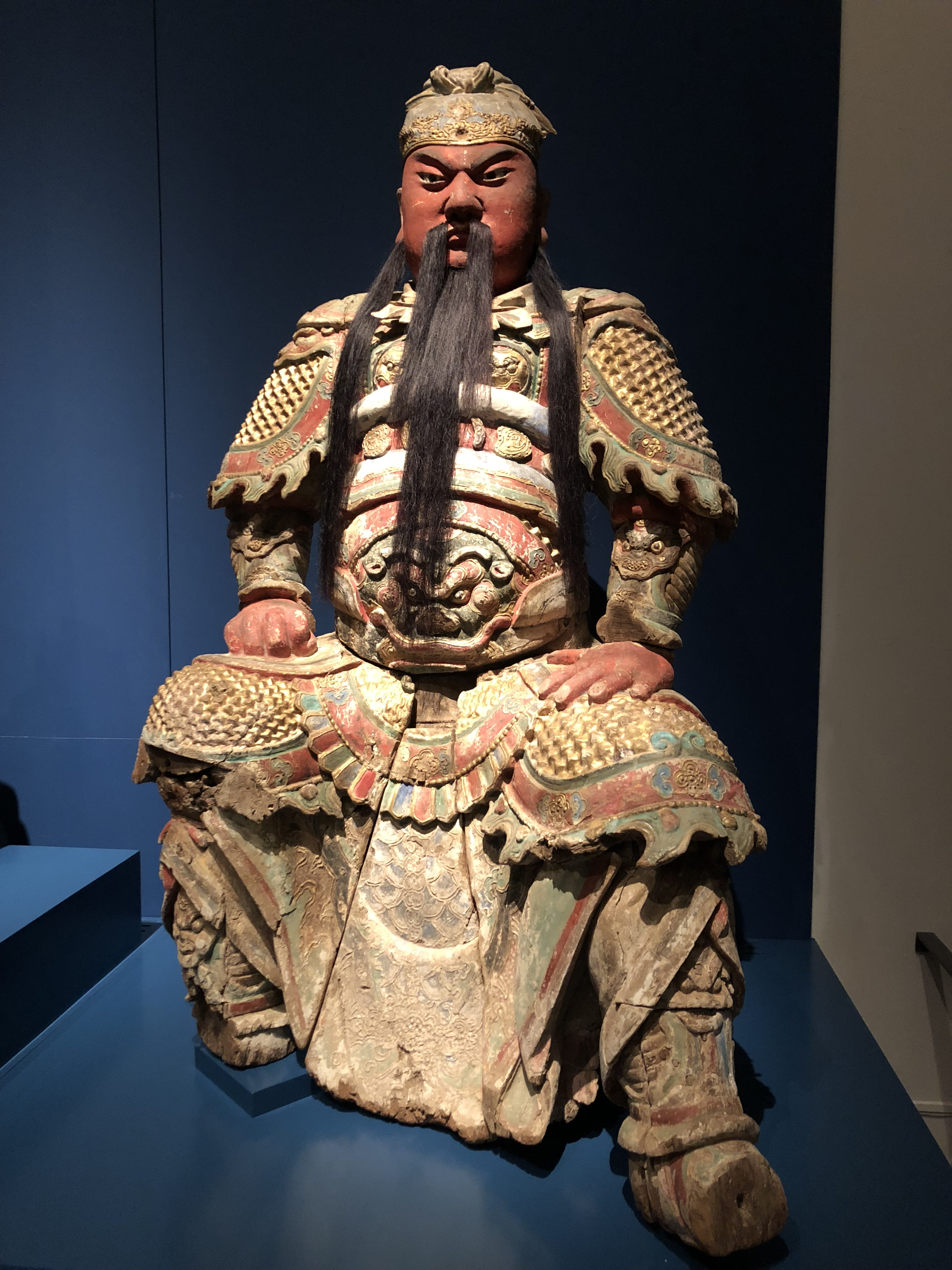
Wooden statue of Guan Yu in mountain pattern armour, 16th c. Ming dynasty

Although Guan Yu defeated and captured Yu Jin at Fancheng, his army found itself lacking food supplies, so he seized grain from one of Sun Quan's granaries at Xiang Pass (湘關). By then, Sun Quan had secretly agreed to an alliance with Cao Cao and sent Lü Meng and others to invade Jing Province while he followed behind with reinforcements. At Xunyang (尋陽), Lü Meng ordered his troops to hide in vessels disguised as civilian and merchant ships and sail towards Jing Province. Along the way, Lü Meng infiltrated and disabled the watchtowers set up by Guan Yu along the river, so Guan Yu was totally unaware of the invasion. (Note: (羽果信之，稍撤兵以赴樊。魏使于禁救樊，羽盡禽禁等，人馬數萬，託以糧乏，擅取湘關米。權聞之，遂行，先遣蒙在前。蒙至尋陽，盡伏其精兵[][]中，使白衣搖櫓，作商賈人服，晝夜兼行，至羽所置江邊屯候，盡收縛之，是故羽不聞知。遂到南郡，士仁、麋芳皆降。) Sanguozhi vol. 54.)

When Guan Yu embarked on the Fancheng campaign, he left Mi Fang and Shi Ren behind to defend his key bases in Jing Province – Nan Commandery and Gong'an. Guan Yu had constantly treated them with contempt. During the campaign, after Mi Fang and Shi Ren sent insufficient supplies to Guan Yu's army at the frontline, an annoyed Guan Yu said, "I will deal with them when I return." Mi Fang and Shi Ren felt uneasy about this. When Sun Quan invaded Jing Province, Lü Meng showed understanding towards Mi Fang and successfully induced him into surrendering while Yu Fan also persuaded Shi Ren to give up resistance. With the exceptions of the northwest, Liu Bei's territories in Jing Province fell under Sun Quan's control after the surrenders of Mi Fang and Shi Ren. (Note: (又南郡太守麋芳在江陵，將軍傅士仁屯公安，素皆嫌羽自輕己。羽之出軍，芳、仁供給軍資不悉相救。羽言「還當治之」，芳、仁咸懷懼不安。於是權陰誘芳、仁，芳、仁使人迎權。) Sanguozhi vol. 36.)

=== Dubious account from the Dianlue ===
The Dianlue recorded:

When Guan Yu was besieging Fancheng, Sun Quan sent a messenger to Guan Yu to offer aid while secretly instructing the messenger to take his time to travel there. He then sent a registrar ahead to meet Guan Yu first. Guan Yu was unhappy that Sun Quan's offer came late because he had already captured Yu Jin by then. He scolded the messenger, "You raccoon dogs dare to behave like this! If I can conquer Fancheng, what makes you think I can't destroy you?" Although Sun Quan felt insulted by Guan Yu's response, he still wrote a letter to Guan Yu and pretended to apologise and offer to allow Guan Yu to pass through his territory freely. (Note: (典略曰：羽圍樊，權遣使求助之，勑使莫速進，又遣主簿先致命於羽。羽忿其淹遲，又自已得于禁等，乃罵曰：「狢子敢爾，如使樊城拔，吾不能滅汝邪！」權聞之，知其輕己，偽手書以謝羽，許以自往。) Dianlue annotation in Sanguozhi vol. 36.)

Pei Songzhi commented on the Dianlue account as follows:

Although Liu Bei and Sun Quan appeared to get along harmoniously, they were actually distrustful of each other. When Sun Quan later attacked Guan Yu, he dispatched his forces secretly, as mentioned in Lü Meng's biography: '[...] elite soldiers hid in vessels disguised as civilian and merchant ships.' Based on this reasoning, even if Guan Yu did not seek help from Sun Quan, the latter would not mention anything about granting Guan Yu free passage in his territory. If they genuinely wished to help each other, why would they conceal their movements from each other? (Note: (臣松之以為荊、吳雖外睦，而內相猜防，故權之襲羽，潛師密發。按呂蒙傳云：「伏精兵於[][]之中，使白衣搖櫓，作商賈服。」以此言之，羽不求助於權，權必不語羽當往也。若許相援助，何故匿其形迹乎？) Pei Songzhi's annotation in Sanguozhi vol. 36.)

== Death ==
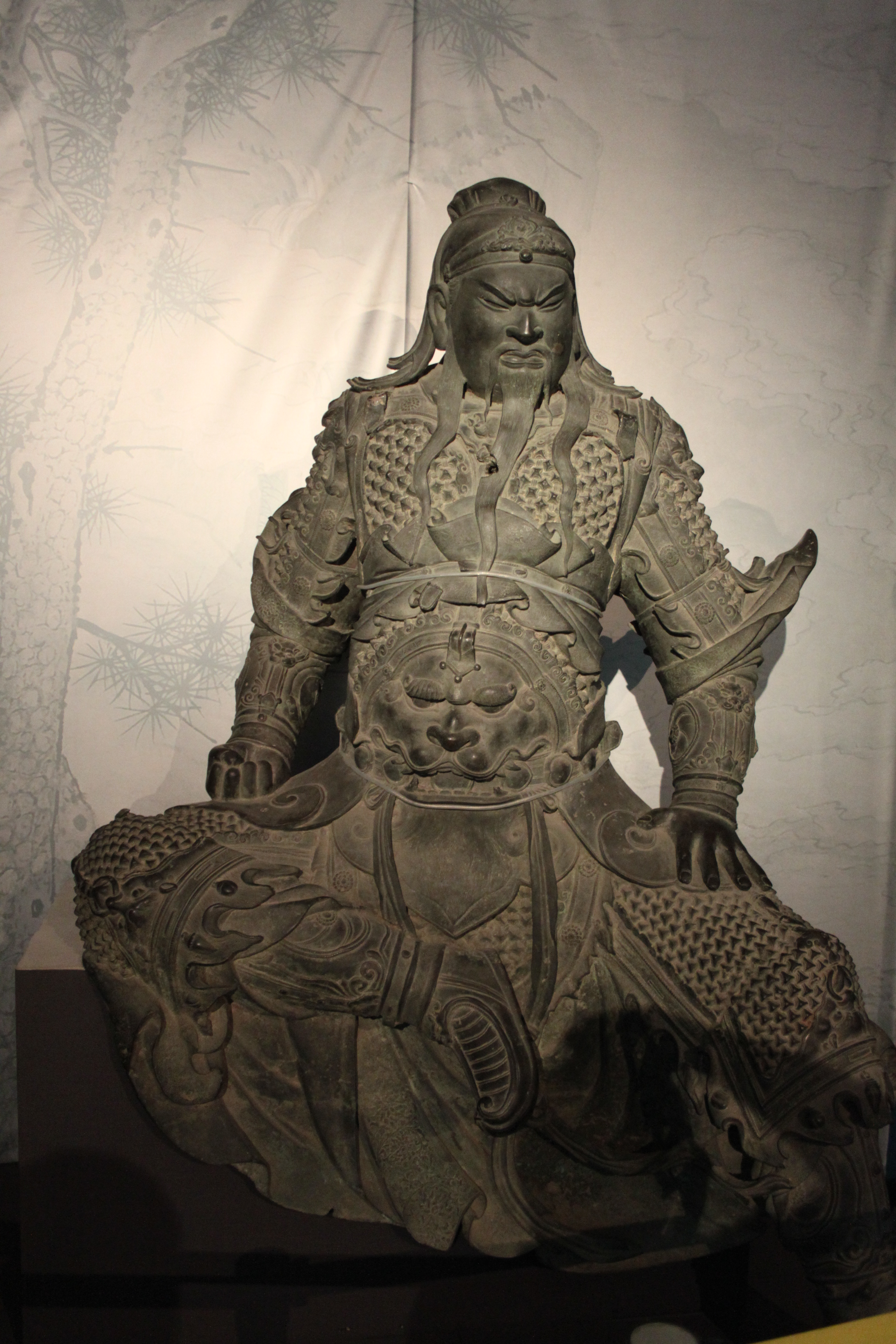
Bronze statue of Guan Yu in mountain pattern armour, Ming dynasty

By the time Guan Yu retreated from Fancheng, Sun Quan's forces had occupied Jiangling and captured the families of Guan Yu's soldiers. Lü Meng ordered his troops to treat the civilians well and ensure that they were not harmed. (Note: See Lü Meng#Invasion of Jing Province for details.) Most of Guan Yu's soldiers lost their fighting spirit and deserted and went back to Jing Province to reunite with their families. Guan Yu knew that he had been isolated so he withdrew to Maicheng (麥城; in present-day Dangyang, Hubei) and headed west to Zhang District (漳鄉), where his remaining men deserted him and surrendered to the enemy. Sun Quan sent Zhu Ran and Pan Zhang to block Guan Yu's retreat route. Guan Yu, along with his son Guan Ping and subordinate Zhao Lei (趙累), were captured alive by Pan Zhang's deputy Ma Zhong (馬忠) in an ambush. Guan Yu and Guan Ping were later executed by Sun Quan's forces in Linju (臨沮; in present-day Nanzhang County, Hubei). (Note: (權已據江陵，盡虜羽士衆妻子，羽軍遂散。權遣將逆擊羽，斬羽及子平于臨沮。) Sanguozhi vol. 36.) (Note: (會權尋至，羽自知孤窮，乃走麥城，西至漳鄉，衆皆委羽而降。權使朱然、潘璋斷其徑路，即父子俱獲，荊州遂定。) Sanguozhi vol. 54.) (Note: (權征關羽，璋與朱然斷羽走道，到臨沮，住夾石。璋部下司馬馬忠禽羽，并羽子平、都督趙累等。) Sanguozhi vol. 55.)

=== Alternate account from the Shu Ji ===
The Shu Ji mentioned that Sun Quan initially wanted to keep Guan Yu alive in the hope of using Guan Yu to help him counter Liu Bei and Cao Cao. However, his followers advised him against doing so by saying, "A wolf shouldn't be kept as a pet as it'll bring harm to the keeper. Cao Cao made a mistake when he refused to kill Guan Yu and landed himself in deep trouble. He even had to consider relocating the imperial capital elsewhere. How can Guan Yu be allowed to live?" Sun Quan then ordered Guan Yu's execution. (Note: (蜀記曰：權遣將軍擊羽，獲羽及子平。權欲活羽以敵劉、曹，左右曰：「狼子不可養，後必為害。曹公不即除之，自取大患，乃議徙都。今豈可生！」乃斬之。) Shu Ji annotation in Sanguozhi vol. 36.)

Pei Songzhi disputed this account as follows:

According to (Wei Zhao's) Book of Wu, when Sun Quan sent Pan Zhang to block Guan Yu's retreat route, Guan Yu was executed after he was captured. Linju was about 200 to 300 li away from Jiangling, so how was it possible that Guan Yu was kept alive while Sun Quan and his subjects discussed whether to execute him or not? The claim that 'Sun Quan wanted to keep Guan Yu alive for the purpose of using him to counter Liu Bei and Cao Cao' does not make sense. It was probably meant to silence smart people. (Note: (臣松之桉吳書：孫權遣將潘璋逆斷羽走路，羽至即斬，且臨沮去江陵二三百里，豈容不時殺羽，方議其生死乎？又云「權欲活羽以敵劉、曹」，此之不然，可以絕智者之口。) Pei Songzhi's annotation in Sanguozhi vol. 36.)

=== Posthumous honours ===
Sun Quan sent Guan Yu's head to Cao Cao, who arranged a noble's funeral for Guan Yu and had his head properly buried with full honours. (Note: (吳歷曰：權送羽首於曹公，以諸侯禮葬其屍骸。) Wu Li annotation in Sanguozhi vol. 36.) In October or November 260, Liu Shan granted Guan Yu the posthumous title "Marquis Zhuangmou" (壯繆侯). (Note: (追謚羽曰壯繆侯。) Sanguozhi vol. 36.) (Note: ([景耀]三年秋九月，追謚故將軍關羽、張飛、馬超、龐統、黃忠。) Sanguozhi vol. 33. The month corresponds to 23 Oct to 20 Nov 260 in the Julian calendar.) According to posthumous naming rules in the Yi Zhou Shu, "mou" was meant for a person who failed to live up to his reputation. (Note: However, in Zhao Yun's biography, it was recorded that the posthumous names granted to Guan Yu, Zhang Fei, Ma Chao, Pang Tong, Huang Zhong and Zhao Yun were considered honours. (Note: (于是关羽、张飞、马超、庞统、黄忠及云乃追谥，时论以为荣。) Sanguozhi, vol.36 (biography of Zhao Yun)) Therefore, "mou" could actually be referring to a positive posthumous name instead. One such name could be "mu" (穆); in the Yizhoushu, "mu" was meant for a person who carried out de and/or upheld yi.)

== Anecdotes ==
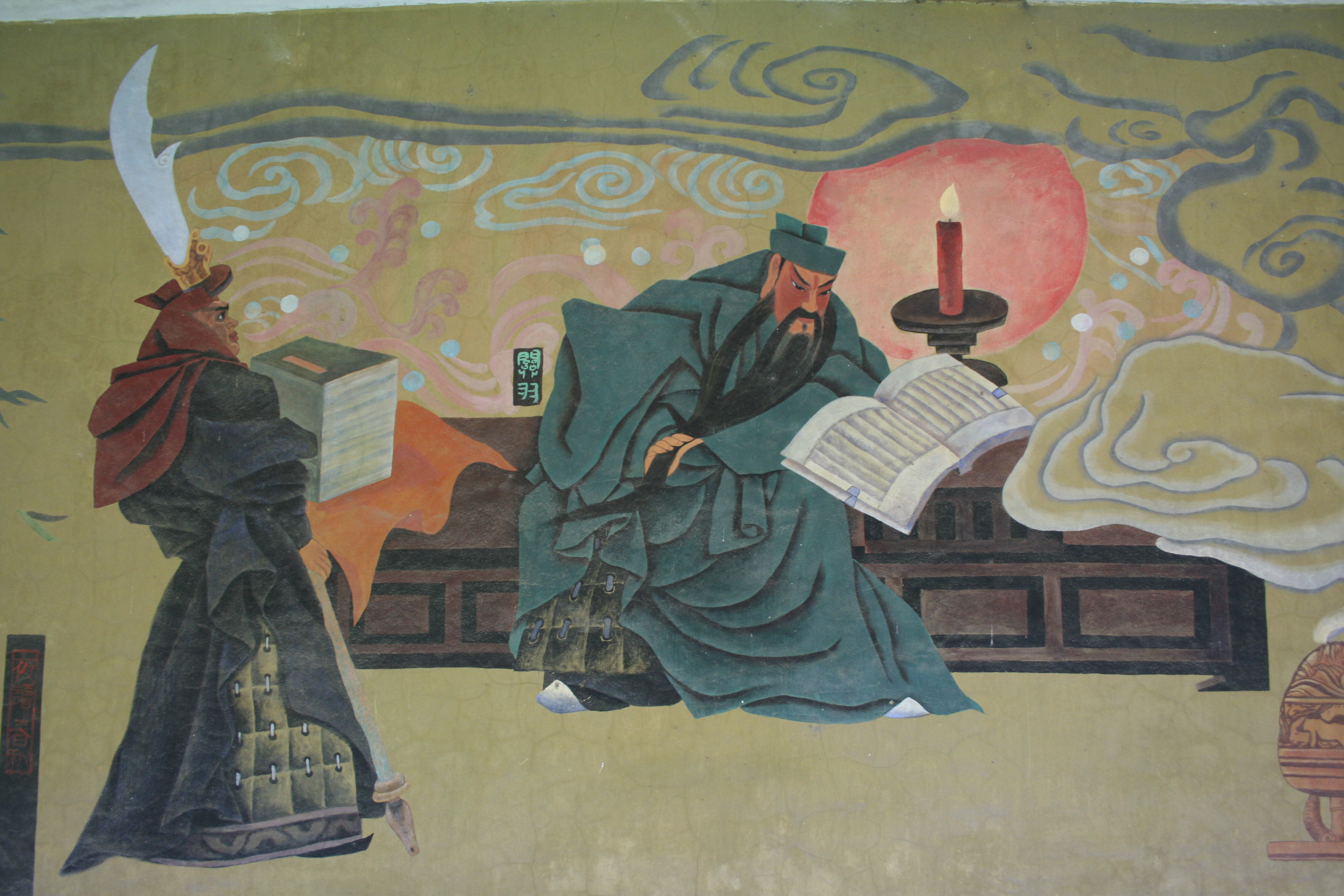
Baling Qiao, mural illustration of Guan Yu Studying Spring and Autumn Annals of Confucius

=== Request to take Qin Yilu's wife ===
During the Battle of Xiapi in late 198, when the allied forces of Cao Cao and Liu Bei fought against Lü Bu, Guan Yu sought permission from Cao Cao to marry Qin Yilu's wife Lady Du (杜氏) after they won the battle. After Cao Cao agreed, Guan Yu still repeatedly reminded Cao Cao about his promise before the battle ended. After Lü Bu's defeat and death, Cao Cao was so curious about why Guan Yu wanted Lady Du so badly and he guessed that she must be very beautiful, so he had her brought to him. Cao Cao ultimately broke his promise as he took Lady Du as his concubine and adopted her son Qin Lang (whom she had with Qin Yilu). (Note: (蜀記曰：曹公與劉備圍呂布於下邳，關羽啟公，布使秦宜祿行求救，乞娶其妻，公許之。臨破，又屢啟於公。公疑其有異色，先遣迎看，因自留之，羽心不自安。此與魏氏春秋所說無異也。) Shu Ji annotation in Sanguozhi vol. 36.) (Note: (初，羽隨先主從公圍呂布於濮陽，時秦宜祿為布求救於張楊。羽啟公：「妻無子，下城，乞納宜祿妻。」公許之。及至城門，復白。公疑其有色，李本作他。自納之。) Huayang Guo Zhi vol. 6.)

=== Advice to Liu Bei ===
The Shu Ji recorded an incident as follows:

When Liu Bei was in the imperial capital Xu, he once attended a hunting expedition together with Cao Cao, during which Guan Yu urged him to kill Cao Cao but he refused. Later, when Liu Bei reached Xiakou (after his defeat at the Battle of Changban), Guan Yu complained, "If you heeded my advice during the hunting expedition in Xu, we wouldn't end up in this troubling situation." Liu Bei replied, "I didn't do so then for the sake of the Empire. If Heaven still helps those who are righteous, it might be possible that this may turn out to be a blessing in disguise!" (Note: (蜀記曰：初，劉備在許，與曹公共獵。獵中，衆散，羽勸備殺公，備不從。及在夏口，飄颻江渚，羽怒曰：「往日獵中，若從羽言，可無今日之困。」備曰：「是時亦為國家惜之耳；若天道輔正，安知此不為福邪！」) Shu Ji annotation in Sanguozhi vol. 36.)

Pei Songzhi commented on the Shu Ji account as follows:

When Liu Bei, Dong Cheng and others plotted against Cao Cao, their plan failed because it was leaked out. If he did not want to kill Cao Cao for the sake of the Empire, what did he mean when he said this? If Guan Yu did urge Liu Bei to kill Cao Cao during the hunting expedition and Liu Bei did not do so, it was probably because Cao Cao's close aides and relatives were present at the scene and they outnumbered him. Besides, there was a lack of careful planning so Liu Bei had to wait for another opportunity. Even if Liu Bei succeeded in killing Cao Cao, he would not have been able to escape alive, so Liu Bei did not heed Guan Yu's words. There was nothing to regret. The hunting expedition event happened in the past, so it was used to justify that Guan Yu had given Liu Bei "valued advice", which the latter ignored. (Note: (臣松之以為備後與董承等結謀，但事泄不克諧耳，若為國家惜曹公，其如此言何！羽若果有此勸而備不肯從者，將以曹公腹心親戚，寔繁有徒，事不宿構，非造次所行；曹雖可殺，身必不免，故以計而止，何惜之有乎！旣往之事，故託為雅言耳。) Pei Songzhi's annotation in Sanguozhi vol. 36.)

=== Asking Zhuge Liang about Ma Chao ===
In 214, Ma Chao defected from Zhang Lu's side to Liu Bei's forces, and he assisted Liu Bei in pressuring Liu Zhang to surrender and yield Yi Province to Liu Bei. When Guan Yu received news that Ma Chao (whom he was unfamiliar with) had recently joined them, he wrote to Zhuge Liang in Yi Province and asked him who was comparable to Ma Chao. Zhuge Liang knew that Guan Yu was defending the border (so he should not displease Guan Yu). He replied: "Mengqi is proficient in both civil and military affairs. He is fierce and mighty, and a hero of his time. He is comparable to Qing Bu and Peng Yue. He can compete with Yide, but he is not as good as the peerless beard." (Note: (羽聞馬超來降，舊非故人，羽書與諸葛亮，問超人才可誰比類。亮知羽護前，乃荅之曰：「孟起兼資文武，雄烈過人，一世之傑，黥、彭之徒，當與益德並驅爭先，猶未及髯之絕倫逸羣也。」) Sanguozhi vol. 36.)

Guan Yu was very pleased when he received Zhuge Liang's reply and he welcomed Ma Chao. (Note: (羽省書大恱，以示賔客。) Sanguozhi vol. 36.)

=== Arm injury ===
Guan Yu was once injured in the left arm by a stray arrow which pierced through his arm. Although the wound healed, he still experienced pain in the bone whenever there was a heavy downpour. A physician told him, "The arrowhead had poison on it and the poison had seeped into the bone. The way to get rid of this problem is to cut open your arm and scrape away the poison in your bone." Guan Yu then stretched out his arm and asked the physician to heal him. He then invited his subordinates to dine with him while the surgery was being performed. Blood flowed from his arm into a container below. Throughout the operation, Guan Yu feasted, consumed alcohol and chatted with his men as though nothing had happened. (Note: (羽甞為流矢所中，貫其左臂，後創雖愈，每至陰雨，骨常疼痛，醫曰：「矢鏃有毒，毒入于骨，當破臂作創，刮骨去毒，然後此患乃除耳。」羽便伸臂令醫劈之。時羽適請諸將飲食相對，臂血流離，盈於盤器，而羽割炙引酒，言笑自若。) Sanguozhi, vol. 36. This anecdote was recorded to take place between Zhuge Liang's letter to Guan Yu after Ma Chao joined Liu Bei (214), and Liu Bei declaring himself King of Hanzhong (219).)

== Family ==
Historical sources indicate that Guan Yu had a wife, but her name is not recorded in either official or unofficial historical accounts. During the Qing dynasty in 1680, the local governor of Xiezhou, Wang Zhudan, erected the Stele of Marquis Guan's Ancestral Tomb (关侯祖墓碑记). The stele's inscription provided the first recorded details of Guan Yu's family, stating that he married a woman known as Lady Hu (胡氏). According to historical accounts, the governor based the stele's inscription on an ancient tomb brick that a local scholar discovered after it was allegedly revealed to him in a dream. While the stele only records her surname as Hu, accompanying regional folklore in Shanxi identifies her full name as Hu Yue (胡玥).

Guan Yu had two known sons – Guan Ping and Guan Xing. Guan Xing inherited his father's title "Marquis of Hanshou Village" (漢壽亭侯) and served in the state of Shu during the Three Kingdoms period. (Note: (子興嗣。興字安國，少有令問，丞相諸葛亮深器異之。弱冠為侍中、中監軍，數歲卒。) Sanguozhi vol. 36.) Guan Yu also had a daughter. Sun Quan once proposed a marriage between his son and Guan Yu's daughter, but Guan Yu rejected the proposal. Her name was not recorded in history, but she was known as "Guan Yinping" (關銀屏) or "Guan Feng" (關鳳) in folktales and Chinese opera, as well as in the Dynasty Warriors video game series (as Guan Yinping). Guan Yu allegedly had a third son, Guan Suo, who is not mentioned in historical texts and appears only in folklore, the Romance of the Three Kingdoms novel, and in Dynasty Warriors.

Guan Xing's son, Guan Tong (關統), married a princess (one of Liu Shan's daughters) and served as a General of the Household (中郎將) among the imperial guards. Guan Tong had no son when he died, so he was succeeded by his younger half-brother Guan Yi (關彝). (Note: (子統嗣，尚公主，官至虎賁中郎將。卒，無子，以興庶子彝續封。) Sanguozhi vol. 36.)

According to the Shu Ji, after the fall of Shu in 263, Pang Hui (Pang De's son) massacred Guan Yu's family and descendants to avenge his father, who was executed by Guan Yu after the Battle of Fancheng in 219. (Note: (蜀記曰：龐德子會，隨鍾、鄧伐蜀，蜀破，盡滅關氏家。) Shu Ji annotation in Sanguozhi vol. 36.)

In 1719, the Kangxi Emperor of the Qing dynasty awarded the hereditary title "Wujing Boshi" (五經博士; "Professor of the Five Classics") to Guan Yu's descendants living in Luoyang. The bearer of the title is entitled to an honorary position in the Hanlin Academy.

== Appraisal ==
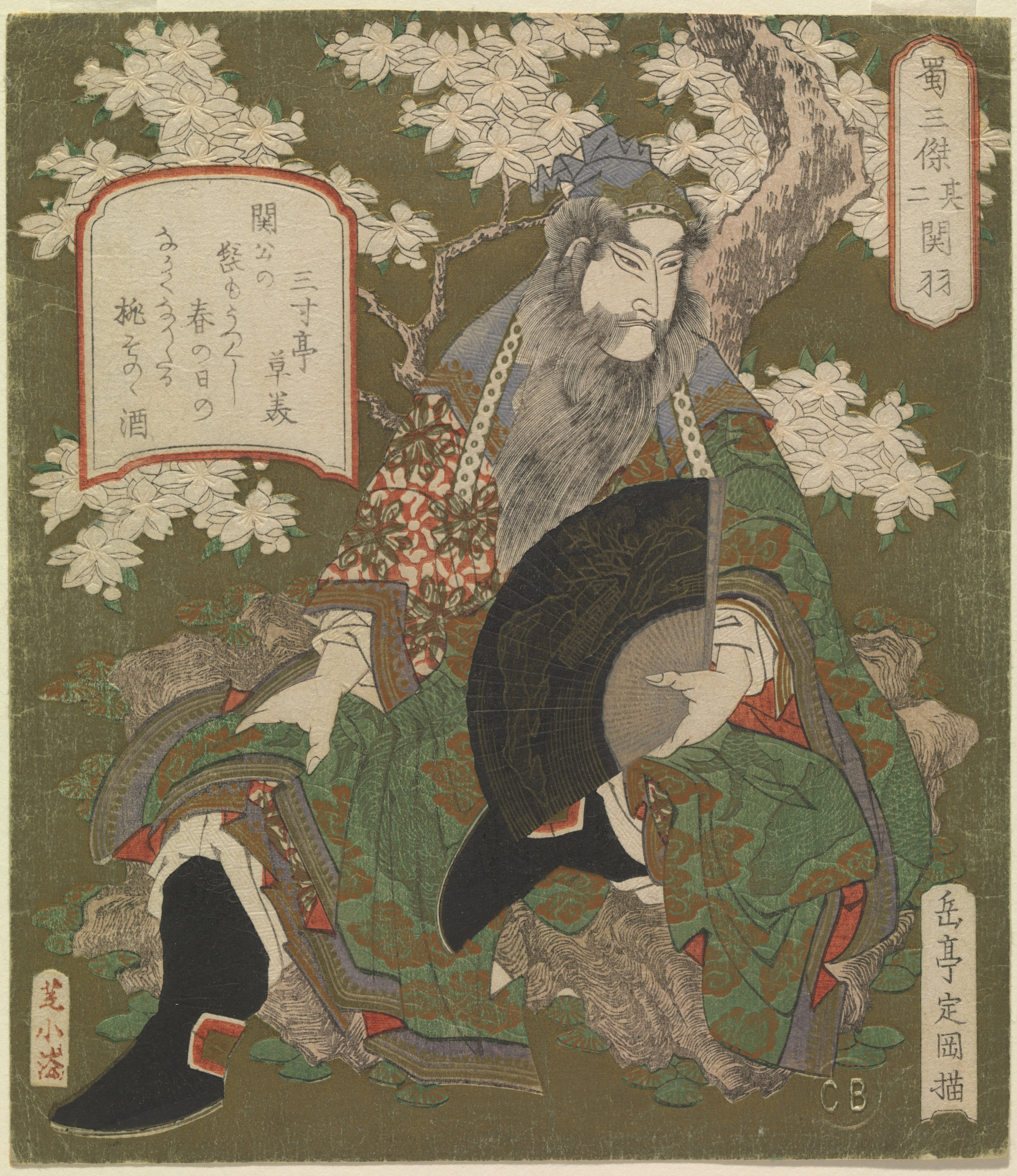
illustration of Guan Yu by Yashima Gakutei in the Chester Beatty Library

Chen Shou, who wrote Guan Yu's biography in the Sanguozhi, commented on the latter as such: "Guan Yu and Zhang Fei were praised as mighty warriors capable of fighting ten thousand of enemies (萬人敵). They were like tigers among (Liu Bei's) subjects. Guan Yu and Zhang Fei both had the style of a guoshi. (Note: Guoshi (國士) could loosely translated as "gentleman of the state". It referred to persons who had made very outstanding contributions to their countries. See the dictionary definition of 國士.) Guan Yu repaid Cao Cao's kindness while Zhang Fei released Yan Yan out of righteousness. However, Guan Yu was unrelenting and conceited while Zhang Fei was brutal and heartless. These shortcomings resulted in their downfalls. This was not something uncommon." (Note: (評曰：關羽、張飛皆稱萬人之敵，為世虎臣。羽報效曹公，飛義釋嚴顏，並有國士之風。然羽剛而自矜，飛暴而無恩，以短取敗，理數之常也。) Sanguozhi vol. 36.)

== Worship ==
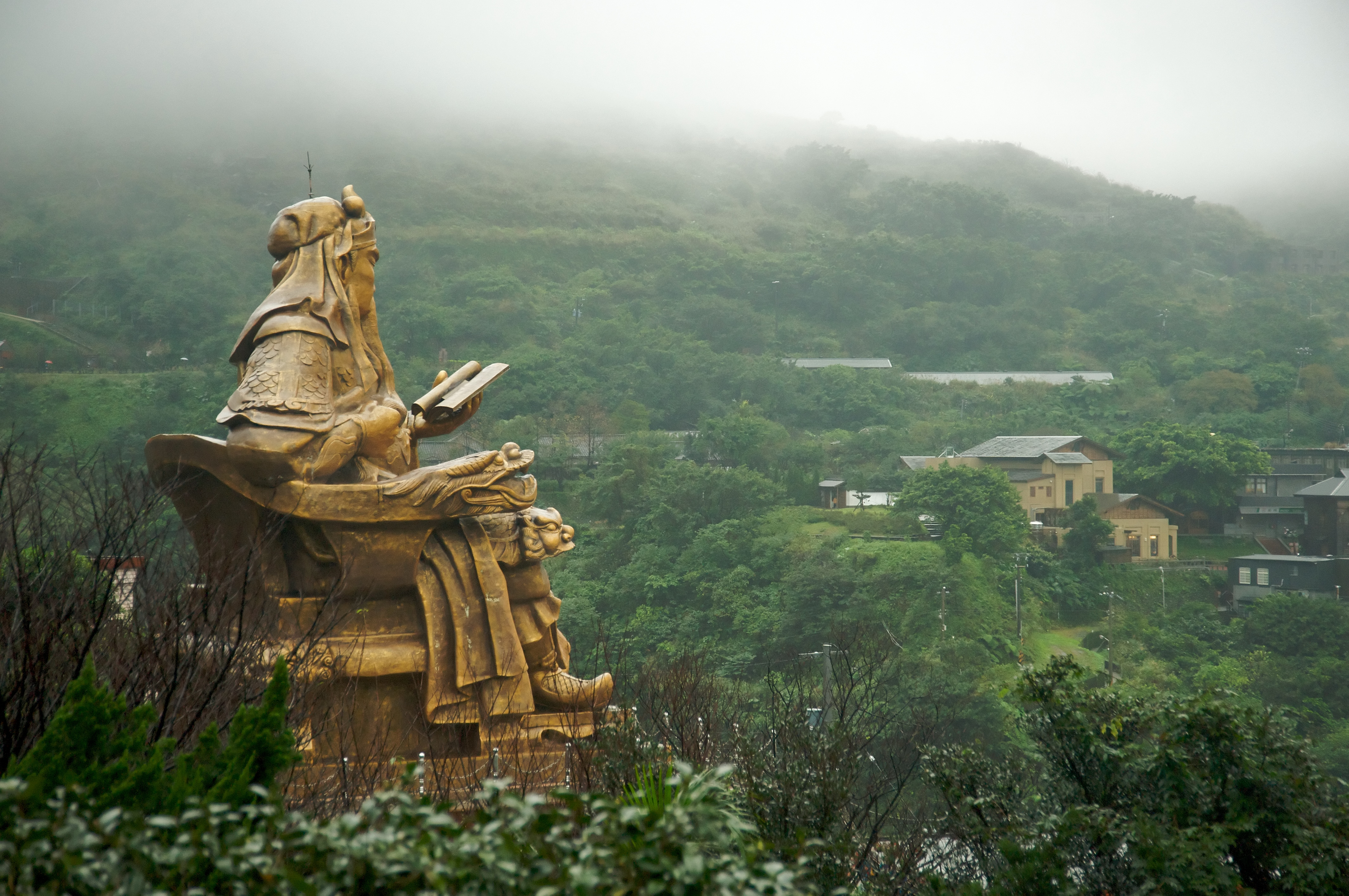
Multi-story-high statue of Guan Yu at Jinguashi

Guan Yu was deified as early as the Sui dynasty (581–618), and is still worshipped today as a bodhisattva in Buddhist tradition and as a guardian deity in Chinese folk religion and Taoism. He is also held in high esteem in Confucianism and in new religious movements such as Yiguandao.

=== In Chinese religion ===
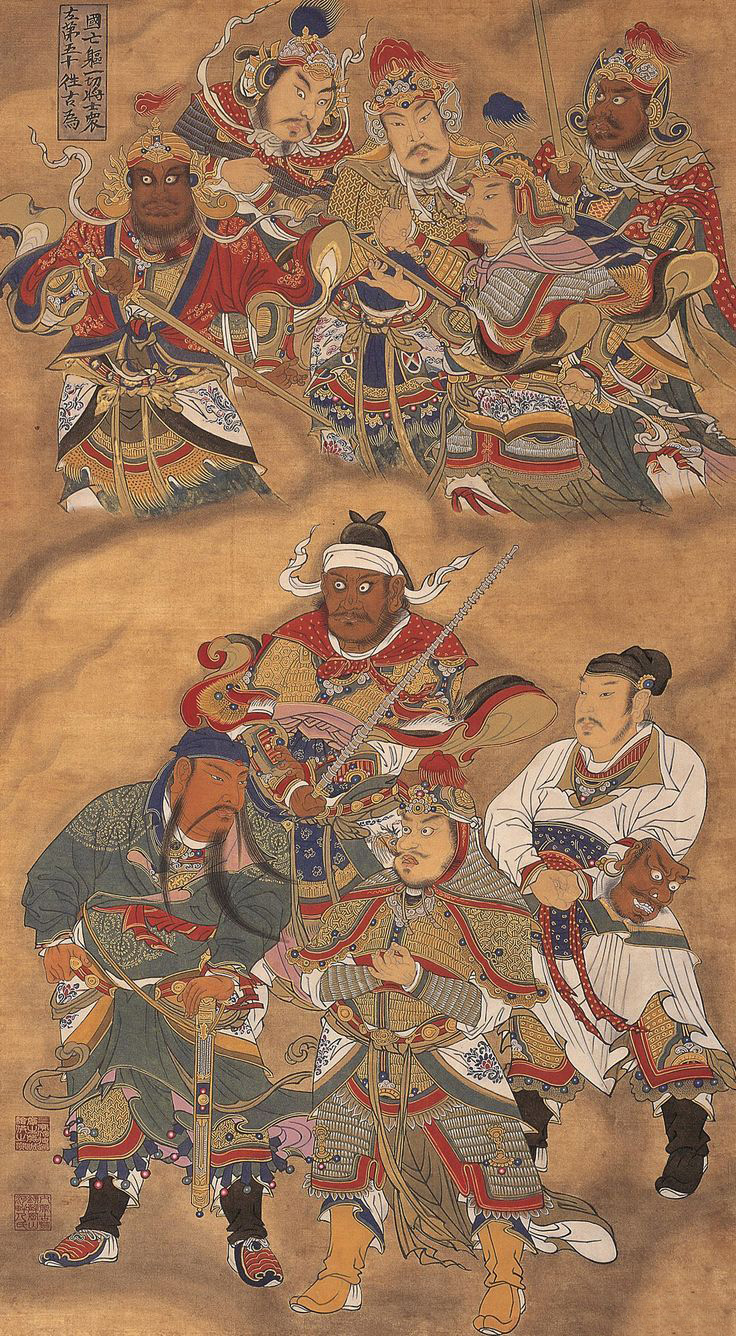
Guan Yu (lower left) as a subject in a Shuilu ritual painting depicting martyred generals

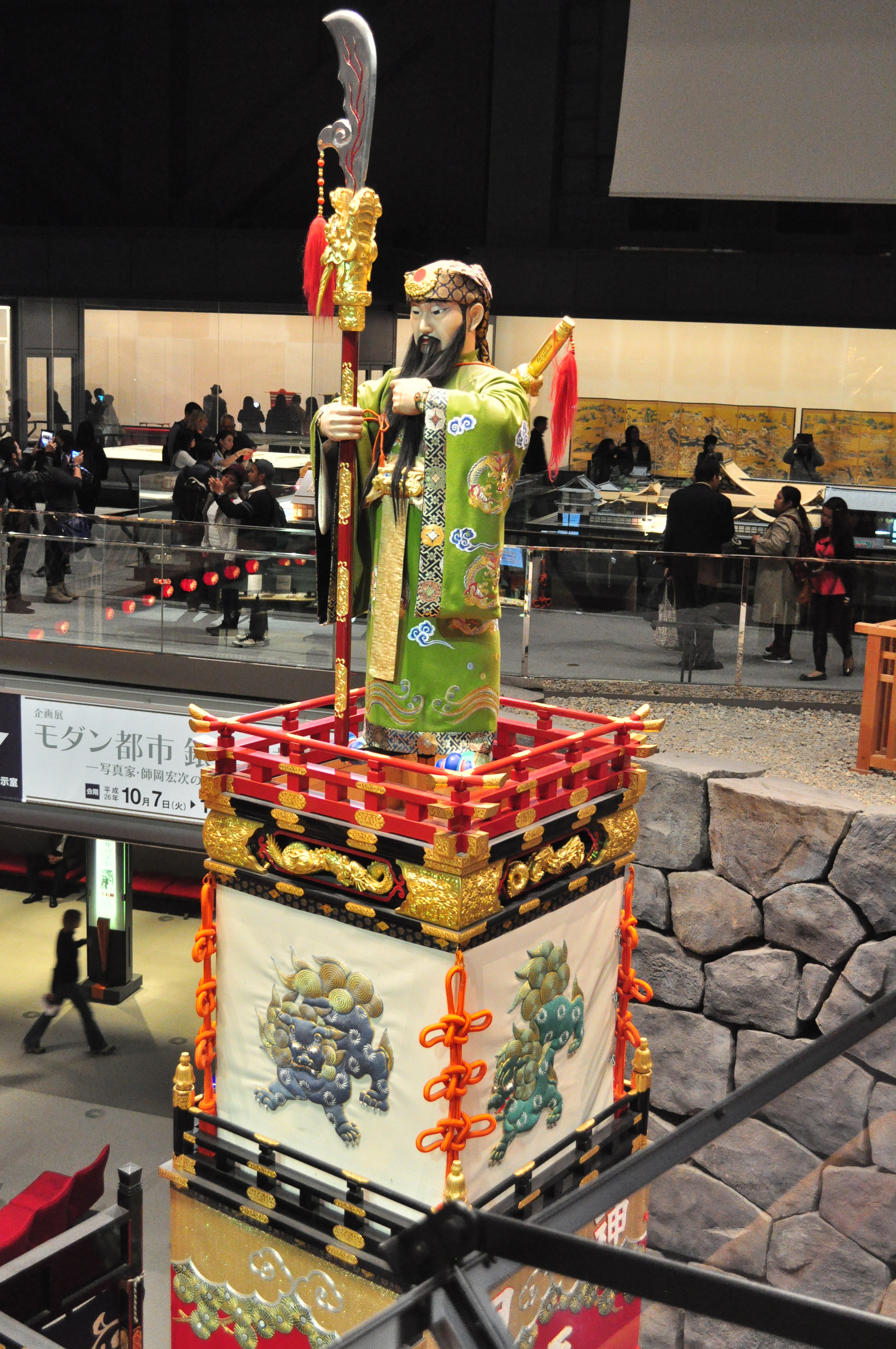
Cart for Shinto procession with Guan Yu statue from the Kanda Shrine, now preserved at the Edo-Tokyo Museum.

In Chinese folk religion, Guan Yu is widely referred to as "Emperor Guan" (關帝; Guāndì; dì implies deified status) and "Lord Guan" (關公; Guān Gōng), while his Taoist title is "Holy Emperor Lord Guan" (關聖帝君; Guān Shèng Dì Jūn). Martial temples and shrines dedicated exclusively to Guan Yu can be found across mainland China, Hong Kong, Macau, Taiwan, and other places with Chinese influence such as Vietnam, South Korea and Japan. Some of these temples, such as the Haizhou Guandi Temple in Shanxi, were built exactly in the layout of an imperial residence, befitting his status as a "ruler". Other examples of Guan Yu temples in China include the Guandi Temple of Jinan and the Guanlin Temple of Luoyang.

==== Historical veneration ====
Early manifestations of Guan Yu portrayed him as a violent figure, akin to a hungry ghost. By the Song dynasty, Guan Yu was viewed as a righteous god who was a paragon of martial prowess and loyalty to the emperor.

The apotheosis of Guan Yu occurred in stages, as he was given ever higher posthumous titles. Liu Shan, the second emperor of Shu, gave Guan Yu the posthumous title of "Marquis Zhuàngmóu" (壯繆侯) four decades after his death. During the Song dynasty, Emperor Huizong bestowed upon Guan Yu the title "Duke Zhōnghùi" (忠惠公), and later the title of a prince. In 1187, Emperor Xiaozong honoured Guan Yu as "Prince Zhuàngmóu Yìyǒng Wǔ'ān Yīngjì" (壯繆義勇武安英濟王). During the Yuan dynasty, Emperor Wenzong changed Guan Yu's title to "Prince of Xìanlíng Yìyǒng Wǔ'ān Yīngjì" (顯靈義勇武安英濟王).

In 1614, the Wanli Emperor bestowed on Guan Yu the title "Holy Emperor Guan, the Great God Who Subdues Demons in the Three Worlds and Whose Awe Spreads Far and Moves Heaven" (三界伏魔大神威遠震天尊關聖帝君). During the Qing dynasty, the Shunzhi Emperor gave Guan Yu the title of "Guan, the Loyal and Righteous God of War, the Holy Great Emperor" (忠義神武關聖大帝) in 1644. This title was expanded to "Guan the Holy Great Emperor; God of War Manifesting Benevolence, Bravery and Prestige; Protector of the Country and Defender of the People; Proud and Honest Supporter of Peace and Reconciliation; Promoter of Morality, Loyalty and Righteousness" (仁勇威顯護國保民精誠綏靖翊贊宣德忠義神武關聖大帝), a total of 24 Chinese characters, by the mid-19th century. It is often shortened to "Saint of War" (武聖; Wǔ Shèng), which is of the same rank as Confucius, who is honoured the "Saint of Culture" (文聖; Wén Shèng). The Qing dynasty promoted the worship of Guan Yu among the Mongol tribes, making him one of their most revered religious figures, second only to their lamas.

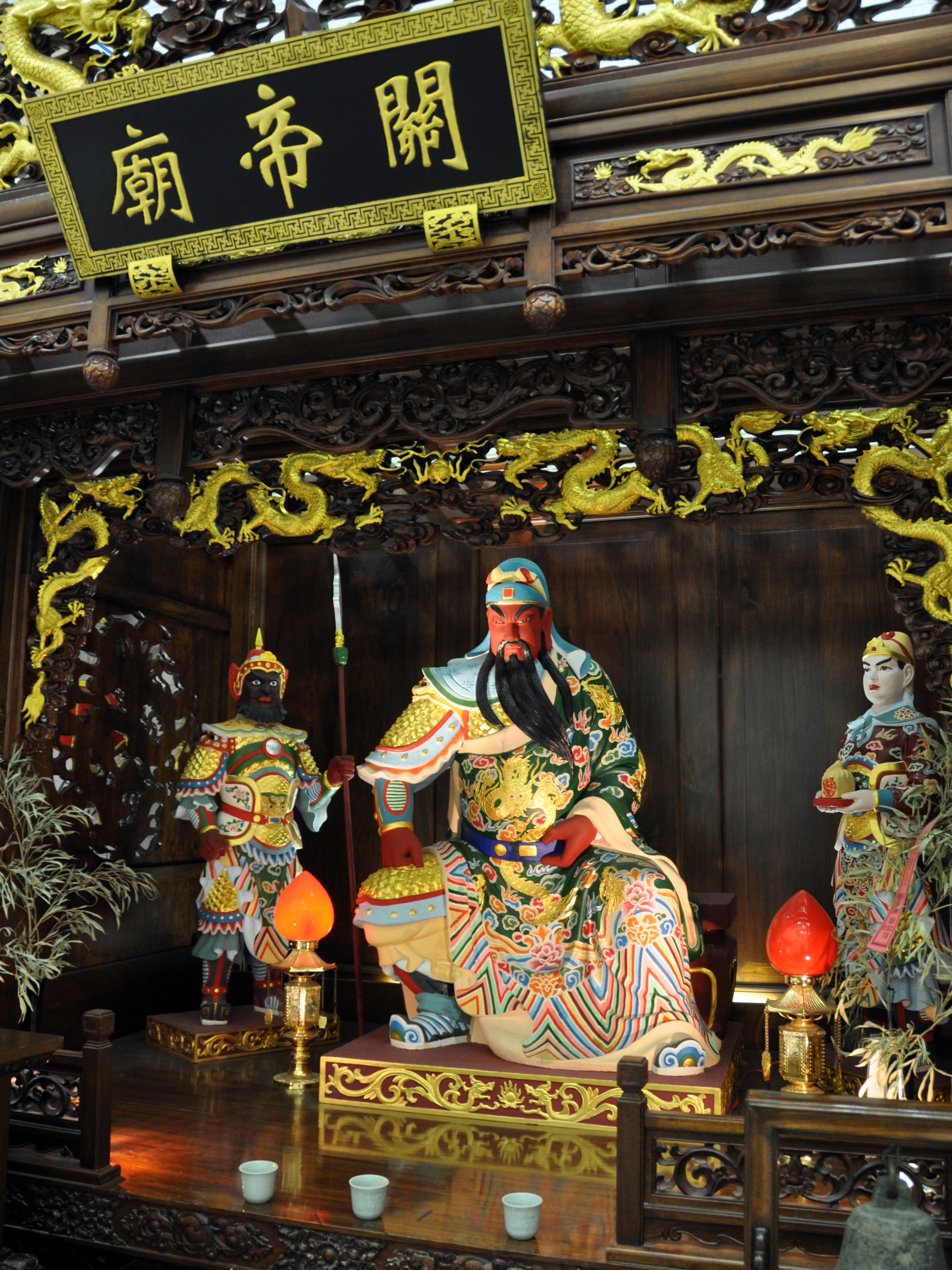
Altar of Guan Yu in Osaka.

Throughout history, Guan Yu has also been credited with many military successes. In the 14th century, his spirit was said to have aided Zhu Yuanzhang, the founder of the Ming dynasty, at the Battle of Lake Poyang. In 1402, when Zhu Di launched a coup d'état and successfully deposed his nephew, the Jianwen Emperor, Zhu Di claimed that he was blessed by the spirit of Guan Yu. During the last decade of the 16th century, Guan Yu was also credited with the repulse of Japanese invasion of Korea by Toyotomi Hideyoshi. The Manchu imperial clan of the Qing dynasty was also associated with Guan Yu's martial qualities. During the 20th century, Guan Yu was worshipped by the warlord Yuan Shikai, president and later a short-lived emperor of China.

Guan Yu's messages were received by mediums through spirit writing, later called Fújī (planchette writing) (扶乩/扶箕), since the late 17th century. "By the mid-Qianlong period (1736–96) the number of 'sacred edicts' issued by Guandi ordering people to do good and help those in need became increasingly frequent." In the 19th century, Guandi's messages received through spirit writing assumed a millennialist character. Dates were announced for the end of the world, followed by messages indicating that Guandi had "prevented the apocalypse" and was indeed "the savior of endtimes." In 1866, the Ten Completions Society (Shíquánhùi 十全會) was established to propagate the messages of Guandi and promote the charitable work his spirit had ordered to perform. The tradition of Guandi spirit writing continued in Chinese folk Religion well into the 20th century.

==== Contemporary veneration ====
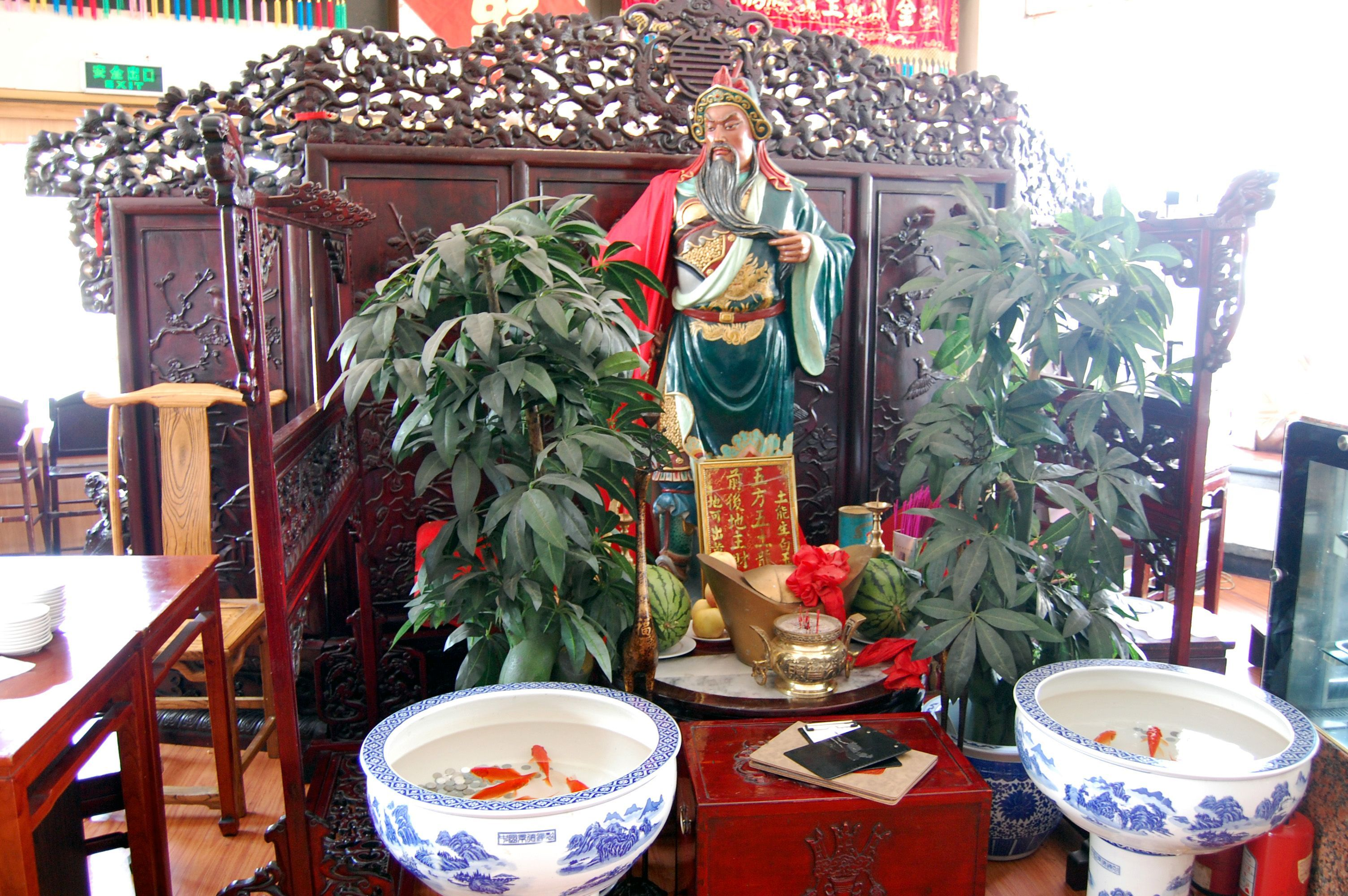
Altar of Guan Yu at a restaurant in Beijing. Guan Gong (关公) at home altar in Selangor.

Today, Guan Yu is still widely worshipped by the Chinese; he may be worshipped in Martial temples and Wen Wu temples, and small shrines devoted to him are also found in homes, businesses and fraternal organisations. In Hong Kong, a shrine to Guan Yu can be found in every police station. Though by no means mandatory, Chinese police officers worship and pay respect to him. Although seemingly ironic, members of the triads and Heaven and Earth Society worship Guan Yu as well. Statues used by triads tend to hold the halberd in the left hand, and statues in police stations tend to hold the halberd in the right hand. This signifies which side Guan Yu is worshipped, by the righteous people or vice versa. The appearance of Guan Yu's face for the triads is usually more stern and threatening than the usual statue. In Hong Kong, Guan Yu is often referred to as "Yi Gor" (二哥; Cantonese for "second elder brother") for he was second to Liu Bei in their fictional sworn brotherhood.

Among Chinese Filipinos in the Philippines, Guan Yu is also sometimes called "Santo Santiago" or "Te Ya Kong" (Hokkien Chinese: 帝爺公; Pe̍h-ōe-jī: Tè-iâ-kong) or "Kuan Kong" (Hokkien Chinese: 關公; Pe̍h-ōe-jī: Koan-kong). This is due to his syncretisation with Hispano-Filipino Catholic devotions to the apostle James the Great, particularly his martial matamoros aspect.

Among the Cantonese people who emigrated to California during the mid-19th century, the worship of Guan Yu was an important element. Statues and tapestry images of the god can be found in a number of historical California joss houses (a local term for Chinese folk religion temples), where his name may be given with various Anglicised spellings, including: Kwan Dai, Kwan Tai or Kuan Ti for Guandi (Emperor Guan); Kuan Kung for Guan Gong (Lord Guan), Wu Ti or Mo Dai for Wu Di (War Deity), Kuan Yu, Kwan Yu, or Quan Yu for Guan Yu. The Mendocino Joss House, a historical landmark also known as Mo Dai Miu (Wudimiao, i.e. the Temple of the Deity of War), or Temple of Kwan Tai, built in 1852, is a typical example of the small shrines erected to Guan Yu in the United States.

Guan Yu is also worshipped as a door god in Chinese and Taoist temples, with portraits of him being pasted on doors to ward off evil spirits, usually in pairings with Zhang Fei, Guan Ping, Guan Sheng or Zhou Cang.

Apart from general worship, Guan Yu is also commemorated in China with colossal statues such as the 1,320-tonne sculpture in Jingzhou City, Hubei Province, standing at 58 metres.

===== Wealth and protective deity in commercial settings =====
Beyond his roles as a martial deity and bodhisattva, Guan Yu is venerated by Chinese businessmen in Shanxi, Hong Kong, Macau and Southeast Asia as a deity of wealth, since he is perceived to bless the upright and protect them from the wicked. A reason often given for this association is the Romance of the Three Kingdoms episode of the Huarong Trail, in which Guan Yu allowed Cao Cao and his men to pass through safely; for that, he was perceived to be able to extend the lifespan of people in need.

The historical basis of Guan Yu's identification as a wealth deity is comparatively recent. Barend J. ter Haar, in his monograph Guan Yu: The Religious Afterlife of a Failed Hero (Oxford University Press, 2017), notes that the earliest documented references to Guan Yu in this role date only to the eighteenth century, considerably later than his establishment as a martial, exorcist, and rain deity, and that the wealth-deity function does not appear in the older narrative traditions preserved in temple stelae.

Among Cantonese, Hokkien, Teochew, and Hakka diaspora business communities — including those of Hong Kong, Singapore, Malaysia, Indonesia, the Philippines and the United States — Guan Yu shrines are conventionally placed at the entrance of shops and offices, with daily incense offered at the opening and closing of business.

The dual veneration of Guan Yu by both law enforcement (notably the Hong Kong Police Force, which maintains shrines in many police stations) and triad organisations is a frequently noted feature of Hong Kong commercial life.

=== In Taoism ===
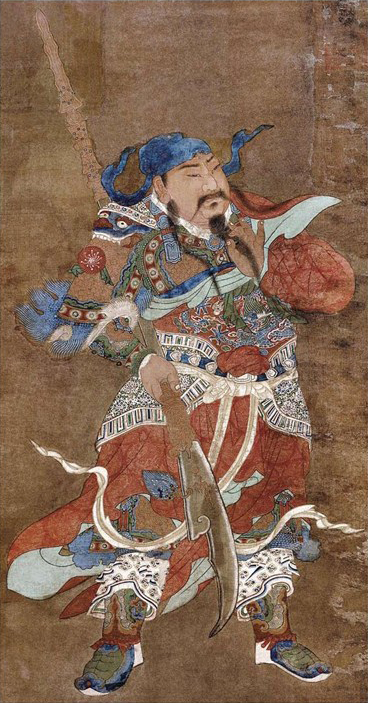
Painting of "Marshal Guan" (關元帥) from White Cloud Temple.

Guan Yu is revered as "Holy Ruler Deity Guan" (關聖帝君; Guān Shèng Dì Jūn) and a leading subduer of demons in Taoism. Taoist worship of Guan Yu began during the Song dynasty. Legend has it that during the second decade of the 12th century, the saltwater lake in Xiezhou gradually ceased to yield salt. Emperor Huizong then summoned Zhang Jixian (張繼先), a 30th-generation descendant of Zhang Daoling, to investigate the cause. The emperor was told that the disruption was the work of Chi You, a deity of war. Zhang Jixian then recruited the help of Guan Yu, who battled Chi You over the lake and triumphed, whereupon the lake resumed salt production. Emperor Huizong then bestowed upon Guan Yu the title "Immortal of Chongning" (崇寧真君; Chóngníng Zhēnjūn), formally introducing the latter as a deity into Taoism.

In the early Ming dynasty, the 42nd Celestial Master, Zhang Zhengchang (張正常), recorded the incident in his book Lineage of the Han Celestial Masters (漢天師世家), the first Taoist classic to affirm the legend. Today, Taoist practices are predominant in Guan Yu worship. Many temples dedicated to Guan Yu, including the Emperor Guan Temple in Xiezhou County, show heavy Taoist influence. Every year, on the 24th day of the sixth month on the lunar calendar (Guan Yu's birthday in legend), a street parade in Guan Yu's honour would also be held.

=== In Buddhism ===
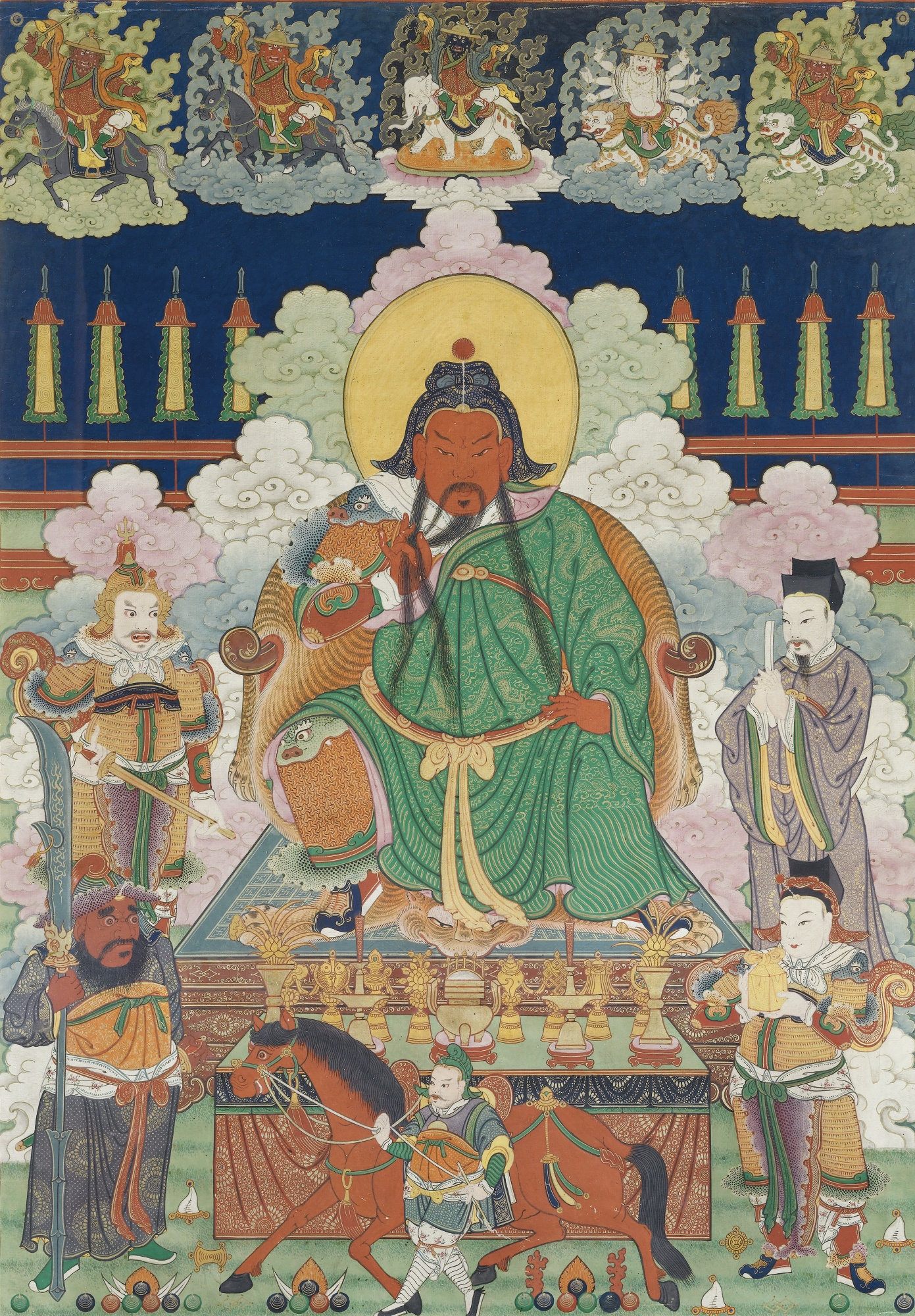
Imperial thangka of the Qianlong period (1736–95) depicting Guan Yu as Sangharama Bodhisattva.

In Chinese Buddhism, Guan Yu is revered by most Chinese Mahayana Buddhists as Sangharama Bodhisattva (伽蓝菩萨; 伽藍菩薩; Qiélán Púsà) a heavenly protector of the Buddhist dharma. Sangharama in Sanskrit means 'community garden' (sangha, community + arama, garden) and thus 'monastery'. The term Sangharama also refer to the dharmapala class of devas and spirits assigned to guard the Buddhist monastery, the dharma, and the faith itself. Over time and as an act of syncreticism, Guan Yu was seen as the representative guardian of the temple and the garden in which it stands. His statue traditionally is situated in the far left of the main altar, opposite his counterpart Weituo.

According to Buddhist legends, in 592, Guan Yu manifested himself one night before the Chan master Zhiyi, the founder of the Tiantai school of Buddhism, along with a retinue of spiritual beings. Zhiyi was then in deep meditation on Jade Spring Hill (玉泉山) when he was distracted by Guan Yu's presence. Guan Yu then requested the master to teach him about the dharma. After receiving Buddhist teachings from the master, Guan Yu took refuge in the triple gems and also requested the Five Precepts. Henceforth, it is said that Guan Yu made a vow to become a guardian of temples and the dharma. Legends also claim that Guan Yu assisted Zhiyi in the construction of the Yuquan Temple, which still stands today.

=== Notable Guandi temples worldwide (outside mainland China) ===
- Dongmyo (東關王廟) in Seoul, South Korea (built in 1601)
- Miếu Quan Công in Hoi An, Quang Nam, Vietnam (built in 1653)
- State Temple of the Martial God (祀典武廟) in Tainan, Taiwan (built in 1663)
- Old Chinese Temple of Seven Prefectures (七府古廟) in Bien Hoa, Vietnam (built in 1684)
- Kuan Tai Temple (Sam Kai Vui Kun) in Macau (built in 1750)
- Gong Wu Shrine, in Bangkok, Thailand
- Kwan Sing Bio Temple (Klenteng Kwan Sing Bio) in Tuban, Indonesia (built in 1773)
- Hội quán Nghĩa An in District 5, Ho Chi Minh City, Vietnam (built in 1819)
- Chùa Ông Quan Đế Miếu in Bac Lieu, Vietnam (built in 1835)
- Temple of Kwan Tai in Mendocino, California, United States (built in 1854)
- See Yup temple in Melbourne, Victoria, Australia (built in 1866 on site of earlier 1856 temple)
- Guandi Temple in Kuala Lumpur, Malaysia (built in 1887)
- Sam Sing Kung Temple in Sabah, Malaysia (built in 1887)
- Sze Yup Kwan Ti Temple in Glebe, New South Wales, Australia (built in 1898)
- Yiu Ming Temple in Alexandria, New South Wales, Australia (built in 1907)
- Yuqing Temple in Miaoli, Taiwan (built in 1906)
- Chinese Temple of Dili in East Timor (built in 1928)
- Xingtian Temple in Taipei, Taiwan (built in 1967)
- Kwan Kung Pavilion in Cheung Chau Island, Hong Kong (built in 1973)
- Setia Budi Temple at Jalan Irian Barat Medan, Indonesia (built in 1908)
- Santiago Chinese Temple in Santiago, Isabela, Philippines
- Kwan Ti Temple in Serian Sarawak Borneo (direct lineage from China)

== In Romance of the Three Kingdoms ==
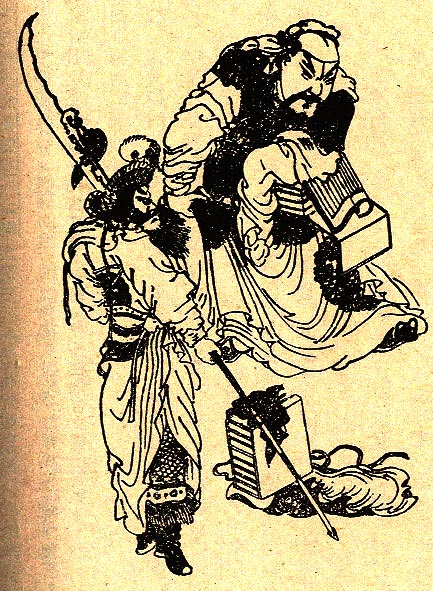
Portrait of Guan Yu (behind) from a Qing dynasty edition of Romance of the Three Kingdoms.

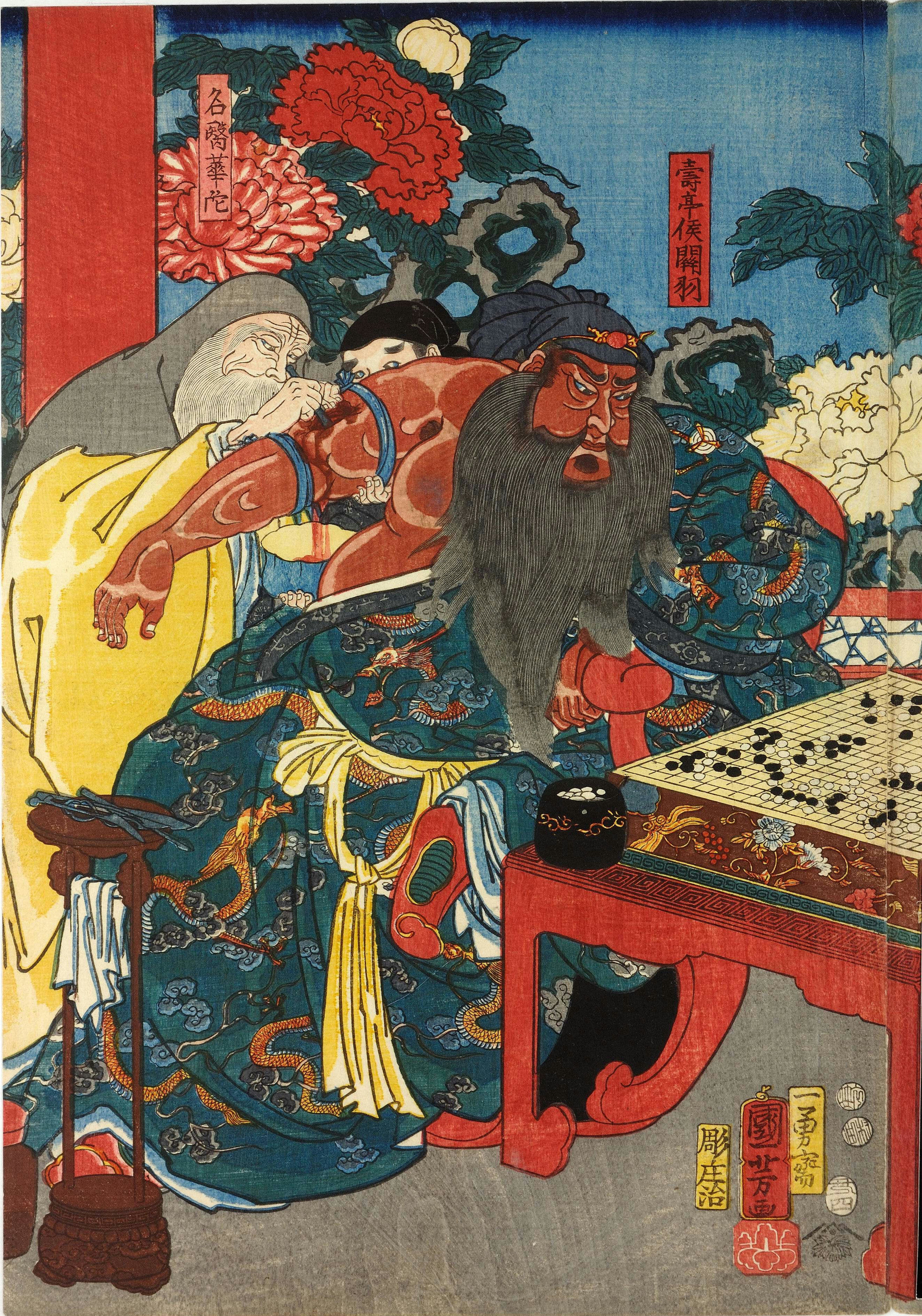
A 19th-century Japanese woodcut of Guan Yu by Utagawa Kuniyoshi. In this scene, he is being attended to by the physician Hua Tuo while playing weiqi. See here for a large version of the full picture.

The 14th-century historical novel Romance of the Three Kingdoms glorifies Guan Yu by portraying him as a righteous and loyal warrior. Guan Yu is one of the most altered and aggrandised characters in the novel, which accounts for his popular image in Chinese society.

See the following for some fictitious stories in Romance of the Three Kingdoms involving Guan Yu:

- Oath of the Peach Garden
- Battle of Hulao Pass
- List of fictitious stories in Romance of the Three Kingdoms#Guan Yu's three conditions
- List of fictitious stories in Romance of the Three Kingdoms#Guan Yu slays Yan Liang and Wen Chou
- List of fictitious stories in Romance of the Three Kingdoms#Guan Yu crosses five passes and slays six generals
- List of fictitious stories in Romance of the Three Kingdoms#Guan Yu slays Cai Yang at Gucheng
- List of fictitious stories in Romance of the Three Kingdoms#Guan Yu releases Cao Cao at Huarong Trail
- Sun–Liu territorial dispute#In Romance of the Three Kingdoms
- List of fictitious stories in Romance of the Three Kingdoms#Hua Tuo heals Guan Yu's arm
- Lü Meng#In Romance of the Three Kingdoms
- List of fictitious stories in Romance of the Three Kingdoms#Events after Guan Yu's death

== In popular culture ==
=== Chinese opera ===
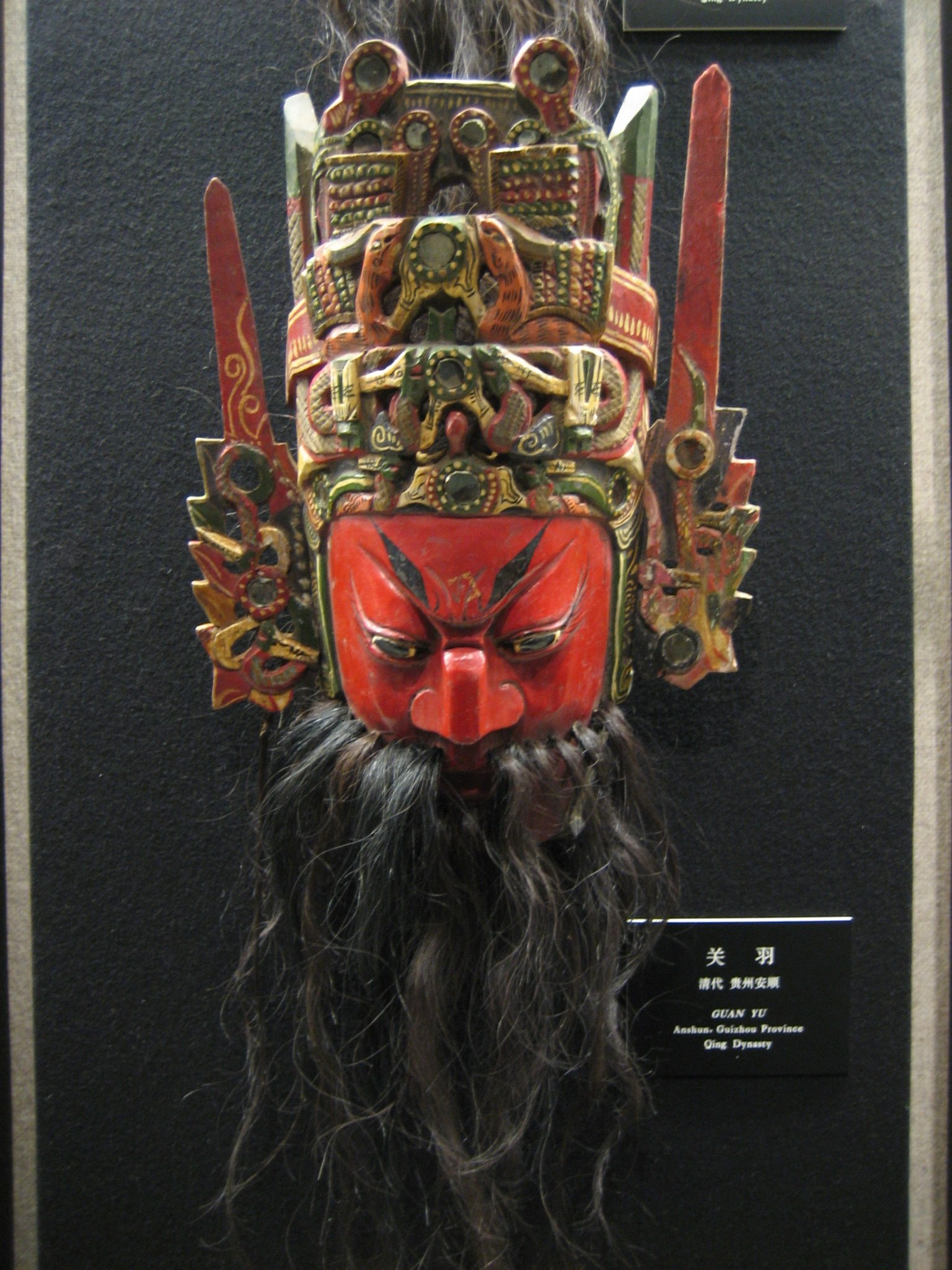
A Qing dynasty opera mask of Guan Yu.

Guan Yu appears in Chinese operas such as Huarong Trail, Red Cliffs, and other excerpts from Romance of the Three Kingdoms. His costume is a green military opera uniform with armour covering his right arm and the knees of his pants. The actor's face is painted red with a few black lines, to represent honour and courage. He also wears a long three-section black beard made of yak hair and carries the Green Dragon Crescent Blade. Traditionally, after the show ends, the actor has to wash his face, burn joss paper, light incense, and pray to Chinese deities.

=== Film and television ===
Notable actors who have portrayed Guan Yu in film and television include: Lu Shuming in Romance of the Three Kingdoms (1994); Wang Yingquan in The Legend of Guan Gong (2004); Ti Lung in Three Kingdoms: Resurrection of the Dragon (2008); Ba Sen in Red Cliff (2008–2009); Yu Rongguang in Three Kingdoms (2010); Donnie Yen in The Lost Bladesman (2011); Au Sui-Wai in Three Kingdoms RPG (2012); Han Geng in Dynasty Warriors (2019).

Films which make references to Guan Yu include: Stephen Chow's comedy film From Beijing with Love (1994), which, in one scene, refers to the story of Hua Tuo performing surgery on Guan Yu's arm; Zhang Yimou's Riding Alone for Thousands of Miles (2005), in which the fictional story of Guan Yu slaying six generals and crossing five passes forms a major part of the narrative; the horror comedy film My Name Is Bruce (2007), where Guan Yu's vengeful spirit is accidentally set free by a group of teenagers and he begins to terrorise their town.

=== Games ===
Guan Yu appears as a playable character in many video games based on Romance of the Three Kingdoms which are produced by Koei, including: the strategy game series of the same title as the novel; the action game series Dynasty Warriors and Warriors Orochi. Other non-Koei titles in which he also appears include: Total War: Three Kingdoms; Puzzle & Dragons; Sango Fighter; Destiny of an Emperor; and Atlantica Online. He is also referenced in Emperor: Rise of the Middle Kingdom, Titan Quest, and Koihime Musō.

Guan Yu is referenced in the Portal Three Kingdoms of the card game Magic: The Gathering on a playable card.

The hero Jiang Jun that appears in an add-on for the game For Honor, developed by Ubisoft Montreal, is heavily based on Guan Yu. He is introduced in the 2018 DLC Marching Fire Expansion, along with the other characters from the Chinese Wulin faction. The Jiang Jun wields Guan Yu's signature Guandao weapon and is portrayed as a wise older general.

Guan Yu is referenced in the 2020 game Hades by Supergiant Games. The final "aspect", or form, unlocked for the Eternal Spear weapon is the Aspect of Guan Yu, the Frost Fair Blade, which resembles an ornamented Guandao. The Eternal Spear is said to be the same spear wielded by Guan Yu in the future, taking this form.

=== Coinage ===
Guan Yu is a popular motif in collector coins series featuring Ancient warriors. Niue issued a 2oz silver coin, produced by the New Zealand Mint, featuring him in 2019, and another one in 2021.

== In modern politics ==
During the course of price liberalization debates as part of China's reform and opening up, Deng Xiaoping invoked the fictitious story of Guan Yu crossing five passes and slaying six generals (as described in the novel Romance of the Three Kingdoms) as part of his rhetoric. "To the Chinese audience familiar with the famous tale of Lord Guan, there could have been no doubt of Deng's determination to push ahead with radical price reforms." As Deng explained in 1986 to a North Korean delegation:

Only once prices have been straightened out will be able to step up reform ... Doesn't China have the tale of Lord Guan 'Slaying Six Generals to Force Through Five Passes?' We might have to pass through even more 'passes' than Lord Guan, slaying even more 'generals.' To force a pass is not at all easy and requires taking great risks.

== See also ==
- Enzhugong (恩主公)
- Martial temple & Wen Wu temple
- Kwan Tai temples in Hong Kong
- Hip Tin temples in Hong Kong
- Holy Emperor Guan's True Scripture to Awaken the World
- Lists of people of the Three Kingdoms
- Statue of Guan Yu (Jingzhou)
- Water Margin, with characters Zhu Tong, nicknamed "Lord of the Beautiful Beard," and Guan Sheng, supposedly Guan Yu's descendant.
