= Holy Emperor Guan's True Scripture to Awaken the World =

Taoist classic work

Holy Emperor Guan's True Scripture to Awaken the World (關聖帝君覺世真經) is a Taoist classic, believed to be written by Lord Guan himself during a Fuji session in 1668. Its name is usually shortened to Scripture to Awaken the World. The purpose of this scripture is to advise people against committing evil deeds for fear of retribution. It is classified as one of the three Taoist Holy Scriptures for Advising the Good, the other two being Lao‑Tzu's Treatise On the Response of the Tao and Lord Superior Wen Chang Tract of the Quiet Way.

The book's main goal is preserving the peace among humans, reflecting the Taoist pursuit of harmony. However, the book also indicates influences from both Buddhism and Confucianism. It includes Buddhism's concept of the karmic forces of one's actions as the source of the same person's happiness or destruction. It also includes Confucianism's concepts of loyalty, filial piety, chastity and righteousness.

The book includes threats of violence against non-believers, in particular threats of death by decapitation.

== History ==
It is believed that the scripture was conceived by Lord Guan himself during a Fuji session during the seventh regnal year of the Kangxi Emperor, Qing Dynasty. It is observed there are two versions of the text, the first one directly states the edict of the Holy Emperor without any preface, this version is found on a plaque in Ningbo, Zhejiang province, believed to carved during the Qing Dynasty. This version is also found in most English translation of the text. Another version is more prevalent in Chinese compilations, it includes a preface by Lord Guan stating that he wishes everyone would follow his teachings to behave in society, if anyone challenges it, they will face his Guandao.

It has been in circulation in several Asian countries besides China for centuries, including Japan, Korea, Vietnam and Thailand. In China, many editions were printed since 1731, with additions of accompanying illustrations and have been annotated by scholars. It was probably brought to Japan by the Buddhist monk Shin-Etsu, where he lived in Nagasaki for several years before being brought to Mito by Tokugawa Mitsukuni. Mitsukuni was a great patron of Chinese literature. Shin-etsu's version was reprinted in 1730, but was destroyed during the Second World War.

== Text ==
The True Scripture to Awaken the World is written in simple Classical Chinese, and on the whole it doesn't contain more than 700 Chinese characters. In the first twelve lines, its writing style follows the three-character rule that is popular among other educational Chinese classics, such as Three Character Classic and Standards for being a Good Pupil and Child, then it expands to the four-character rule of Chinese idioms, also known as Chengyu. Usually accompanying the scripture are examples of those who have benefited from the scripture.

== Interpretations and themes ==
Its core ideology of preserving the peace among humans is spread across many facets of human daily life. Its theory on family, business, human relationships, ecological interaction and karmic retribution, reflects the Taoist pursuit of harmony among people in the society, and serves as a guide to teach younger generation on to create a better society. Although classified as a Taoist scripture, its theme and choice of words have clear Confucian and Buddhist influence. The basis of Lord Guan worship revolves around loyalty, filial piety, chastity and righteousness; these are direct influence from Confucian teachings, which have served as the backbone of Chinese culture. Though Confucianism puts more emphasis on humane values, the Scripture to Awaken the World emphasizes these four values to form healthy minds and bodies.

The Buddhist influence in the scripture is reflected by statements of karmic forces of one's actions, where one plants and sow the seeds of either one's happiness or destruction. In its ending verses, the scripture states that good and evil are two roads that separate one's future happiness or misery, and it is up to the reader to follow the wishes of Lord Guan or his/her own desires. As Buddhism is also another prevalent belief in Chinese culture, the Scripture to Awaken the World is written with the core Buddhist belief of karma to advise people to behave themselves.

In comparison with other holy books, violence plays a more important and personal theme here. In his scripture, Lord Guan explicitly says that he will act as an enforcer, and will behead anyone who ridicule his teachings. His role as an enforcer befits his character and also shows that violence in the overall religious setting of imperial China was more normal than it is often thought.

== Translations ==
There is no formal translation of the scripture in English. However, the shorter and direct version can be found in "A Dictionary of the Chinese Language" compiled by the Anglo-Scottish missionary Robert Morrison.

== Propagation ==
The propagation of True Scripture to Awaken the World is not only in books, but in many media, such as illustrations, songs, oral storytelling, stage plays, and carvings on rock plaque and on temple wooden pillars. In China, oral storytelling is a popular entertainment for normal citizens. It is also used to spread good teachings. The folklorist Hiroji Naoe commented that during the 1940s, he recognized the influence of oral storytelling in spreading Lord Guan's teachings in Shanxi province. He met two female oral storytellers in Taiyuan, and found that their story programs include many of Lord Guan's stories and teachings. He discovered that one of the main reasons that Lord Guan's teachings could reach deep into the minds of the illiterate lay person in remote areas was the contribution of oral storytelling.

Oral reading of scripture is part of ritual worship of the deity. According to records, during the 17th century, Chinese immigrants in Nagasaki, Japan saw Lord Guan as their protector deity, and their worshiping ritual was grand and formal: besides setting up food offerings, dragon dancing, etc., they also invited Buddhist or Taoist clerics to recite the True Scripture to Awaken the World.

The Pure Land Buddhism monk, Yinguang also recommended the reading and circulation of True Scripture to Awaken the World, Lao‑Tzu's Treatise On the Response of the Tao and Lord Superior Wen Chang Tract of the Quiet Way in his replies to his believers on how to raise a child. In his letters, he states the importance of a child, when able, to read and memorize these 3 books and follow their teachings diligently.
