= Ye =

Ye or YE may refer to:

The American songwriter and artist Ye.

== Language ==
- Ye (pronoun), a form of the second-person plural, personal pronoun "you"
- Ye (article), a typographic form of the definite article "the"
- Ye (Cyrillic) (Е), a Cyrillic letter
- Ukrainian Ye (Є), a Cyrillic letter
- Ye (kana), an archaic Japanese kana

== Names and people ==
- Ye (surname) (葉/叶), a Chinese surname
- Ye the Great (大業/大业), a figure in Chinese mythology
- Kanye West (born 1977), an American rapper, legally known as Ye since 2021

== Places ==
=== China ===
- Ye (Hebei), a city in ancient China
- Ye County, Henan, China
- Laizhou, formerly Ye County, Shandong

=== Myanmar ===
- Ye River, in Mon State
  - Ye, Myanmar, a town on the river

=== Elsewhere ===
- Yé, Lanzarote, a village on the island of Lanzarote, Spain
- Ye (Korea), an ancient Korean kingdom
- Yemen (ISO 3166-1 code YE)

== Music ==
=== Albums ===
- Ye (album), 2018, by Kanye West

=== Songs ===
- "Ye" (song), 2018, by Burna Boy
- "Ye", a 2024 song by Nine Vicious

== Other uses ==
- .ye, the country code top-level domain for Yemen
- "Year end", in accounting, particularly in FYE (fiscal year end)
- Ammunition barge (US Navy hull classification symbol "YE")
- Honda Ye, a family of electric cars
- Yé, slang for cocaine derived from the Spanish term "llello"

== See also ==
- Ye Olde
- Yee (disambiguation)
- EY (disambiguation)
