= Yee (disambiguation) =

Yee is a surname.

Yee or YEE may also refer to:

- "Yee" (song), a 2013 single by American DJ/producer Deorro
- Yee Nunataks, a geological feature in Palmer Land, Antarctica
- Yee Hope FC, a former Hong Kong football club

== See also ==
- Yi (disambiguation)
- Ye (disambiguation)
- Yeehaw (disambiguation)
- YYE
