= 4776 Luyi =

Asteroid

Discovery
- Discovered by: Harvard University
- Discovery site: Oak Ridge Obs.
- Discovery date: 3 November 1975

Designations
- Named after: Luyi (Chinese town)
- Alternative designations: 1975 VD · 1982 RD_{2} 1982 UU
- Minor planet category: main-belt · (inner) background

Orbital characteristics
- Epoch 23 March 2018 (JD 2458200.5)
- Uncertainty parameter 0
- Observation arc: 42.21 yr (15,418 d)
- Aphelion: 2.8529 AU
- Perihelion: 1.7765 AU
- Semi-major axis: 2.3147 AU
- Eccentricity: 0.2325
- Orbital period (sidereal): 3.52 yr (1,286 d)
- Mean anomaly: 40.564°
- Mean motion: 0° 16^{m} 47.64^{s} / day
- Inclination: 5.3929°
- Longitude of ascending node: 3.2435°
- Argument of perihelion: 349.13°

Physical characteristics
- Mean diameter: 3.645±0.045 km
- Geometric albedo: 0.305±0.030
- Absolute magnitude (H): 14.3

4776 Luyi, provisional designation 1975 VD, is a bright background asteroid from the inner regions of the asteroid belt, approximately 3.6 kilometers (2.2 miles) in diameter. It was discovered on 3 November 1975, by Harvard astronomers at the Oak Ridge Observatory in Massachusetts, United States. The asteroid was named for the Chinese town of Luyi, birthplace of Laozi who founded Taoism. Luyi is also named after the son of Harvard astronomer Cheng-yuan Shao.

== Orbit and classification ==
Luyi is a non-family asteroid from the main belt's background population. It orbits the Sun in the inner asteroid belt at a distance of 1.8–2.9 AU once every 3 years and 6 months (1,286 days; semi-major axis of 2.31 AU). Its orbit has an eccentricity of 0.23 and an inclination of 5° with respect to the ecliptic. The body's observation arc begins with its first and official discovery observation at Oak Ridge.

== Physical characteristics ==
The asteroid has an absolute magnitude of 14.3. Its spectral type is unknown. Based on its high albedo (see below), Luyi is a bright asteroid of the S-complex. As of 2018, no rotational lightcurve has been obtained from photometric observations. The body's rotation period, pole and shape remain unknown.

=== Diameter and albedo ===
According to the survey carried out by the NEOWISE mission of NASA's Wide-field Infrared Survey Explorer, the asteroid measures 3.645 kilometers in diameter and its surface has a high albedo of 0.30.

== Naming ==
This minor planet was named after a town in the eastern Henan province of China that was the birthplace of Laozi, founder of Taoism, because long-time participant in Harvard's minor-planet program, astronomer Cheng-yuan Shao (born 1927), came from that town (also see 1881 Shao). The asteroid is also named after his son, Luyi.

The official naming citation was published by the Minor Planet Center on 21 November 1991 (M.P.C. 19339).
