= Lu Yi =

Lu Yi may refer to:

== People named Lu Yi ==
- Lu Xun (Eastern Wu) (183–245), born Lu Yi (陸議), Eastern Wu general and chancellor of the Three Kingdoms period
- Lu Yi (Tang dynasty) (陸扆; 847–905), Tang dynasty chancellor
- Lu Yi (actor) (陆毅; born 1976), Chinese actor
- Lu Yi (footballer) (鲁毅; born 1993), Chinese footballer

== People named Lü Yi ==
- Lü Yi (Eastern Wu) (呂壹; died 238), Eastern Wu official of the Three Kingdoms period
- Lü Yi (Shu Han) (呂乂; died 251), Shu Han official of the Three Kingdoms period
- Lü Yi (Ming dynasty) (died 1409), Ming dynasty general
- Lü Yi (runner) (吕亿; born 1974), female Chinese middle-distance runner
- Lü Yi (Paralympic athlete) (呂毅; born 1977), Chinese Paralympic athlete
- Lü Yi (badminton) (吕轶; born 1985), Chinese badminton player

== See also ==
- Luyi (disambiguation)
