= Treatise on the Response of the Tao =

Taoist book by Li Ying-Chang

The Taishang Ganying Pian (太上感應篇), or Lao Tse's Treatise on the Response of the Tao, is a Taoist scripture from the 12th century that has been very influential in China. Li Ying-Chang, a Confucian scholar who retired from civil administration to teach Taoism, authored this. It is traditionally attributed to Lao Tse (or rather his divine form Taishang Laojun) himself.

== Interpretation and themes ==
The Treatise covers thoughts, words, and deeds in terms of ganying. It has a simple, practical approach to ethics, lacking any esoteric details. It is all about good deeds. These are rewarded by longevity and health. Lists of deeds, both good and evil, are given in this tract. They focus on crimes, business practices, and other every day actions and events. It represents a turn away from previous Taoism in that it focuses not on meditative practices or self cultivation but on action in the world. Taoism represents a variety of different viewpoints and practices hard to categorize by era or sect. Categorizations are disputed by scholars. The Lushan Sect of Taoism, from the Southern Song Dynasty (1127-1297 ce) is a Taoist sect representative of the type of Taoism in the treatise, called 'acts and karma Taoism' by Eva Wong. There are few texts that represent this type of Taoism, this being the main one. Most of the others are morality tales that grew up around this Treatise. The lack of scriptures for this current of belief has in no way detracted from its popularity. Mahayana Buddhist viewpoint influenced this scripture. This book was most popular during the Ming dynasty, (1368-1644 ce)

== Impact ==
The Treatise has attracted both Taoists and Non-Taoists. It has gained a large population base among the commoner, because it does not require a monastery to practice.

== Text ==
It is a short tract, written before Buddhism, Taoism, and Confucianism were deliberately synthesized by scholars or the state. The stories that accompany it were written during or after this synthesis. The time of writing is after folk beliefs had begun to influence Taoism, which may have begun with Zhuangzi.

== Translations ==
It was first translated into English by Christian missionary Douglas Legge, in 1891. He thought it was crucial for the understanding of Chinese people's moral thought. There is a recent translation by Eva Wong and co. A new English Liturgy Version has also been recently published by Terebess Asia Online (see external links).

== Commentary ==
There is a commentary of the treatise by a Daoist renunciant Xīng Dé, translated to English by Johan Hausen.

== See also ==
- Buddhist ethics
- Tao Te Ching
- Taoism
- Eastern Philosophy
- Zhuangzi (book)
- Three teachings
- Holy Emperor Guan's True Scripture to Awaken the World - It is classified as one of the three Taoist Holy Scriptures for Advising the Good, the other two being Lao‑Tzu's Treatise On the Response of the Tao and Lord Superior Wen Chang Tract of the Quiet Way.
