= Yizhou =

Yi Prefecture, Yi Zhou, or Yizhou may refer to:

- Yizhou (Southwest China) (益州), a historical province of China covering southwest China
- Yi Prefecture (Shandong) (沂州), active between the 7th and 18th centuries
- Yi Prefecture (Guangxi) (宜州), active between the 7th and 13th centuries
- Yi Prefecture (Hebei) (易州)
- Yi Prefecture (Korea), now known as Uiju or Uiju County
- Yizhou District, Hechi (宜州区), district of Hechi, Guangxi named after the historical prefecture
- Yizhou District, Hami (伊州区), district of Hami, Xinjiang
- Yizhou (island) (夷洲), a legendary island in ancient Chinese texts, possibly referencing Taiwan or the Ryukyus

== See also ==
- Yi (disambiguation)
