= Luyi (disambiguation) =

Luyi primarily refers to Luyi County (鹿邑县), of Zhoukou, Henan, China:

Luyi may also refer to:

- 4776 Luyi, main-belt asteroid discovered in 1975, named after the county
- Luyi, Beijing, Subdistrict in Tongzhou District, Beijing, China
- Luyi, Zhenping County (卢医镇), town in Zhenping County, Henan, China
