= -ey =

The suffix -ey can appear in the English language:

- from Dutch/Scottish origin, as a diminutive like -ie or simply -y, with several other values
- from Old Norse, in placenames with the meaning of "island", as in Jersey, Guernsey, Alderney, or Caldey

== See also ==
- EY (disambiguation)
