= Yee =

- Yu (Chinese surname) (Chinese: 余)
- Yee, a surname (simp. 叶, trad. 葉) -- variants Yee, Yeh, Yip/Ip, Yap, Yapp

== Notable people with surname Yee (余) ==
Persons with surname "Yee"(余) include:

- James Yee (born 1968), former US Army chaplain, and author
- Kelvin Han Yee (born 1961), American actor

== Notable people with surname Yee (爾) ==
Persons with surname "Yee"(爾) include:

- Derek Yee (born 1957), film director and screenwriter

== Notable people with surname Yee ==
- Alex Yee, British triathlete
- Angela Yee, American radio personality
- Becky Yee (born 1969), American portrait photographer
- Betty Yee, California Comptroller
- David Yee, Canadian actor and playwright
- Harry Yee (1918-2022), American bartender
- Jennifer Yee, American chef
- Jimmie R. Yee (born 1934), American politician
- Kelvin Han Yee, American actor
- Kimberly Yee (born 1974), American politician
- Leland Yee (born 1948), American politician
- Lisa Yee, Chinese American writer
- Marina Yee (1958–2025), Belgian fashion designer
- Mark Yee (born 1982), Filipino basketball player
- Mary Yee (née Ygnacio, 1897–1965), the last first-language speaker of the Barbareño language
- Nick Yee, American researcher of social interaction in virtual environments
- Paul Yee (born 1956), Chinese-Canadian historian and writer
- Richard Yee, Filipino basketball player
- Rodney Yee, American yoga instructor
- Yee Chung-Man, Chinese production designer, art director, costume designer and film director
- Yee Jee Tso (born 1975), Canadian actor
