= Yi County =

Yi County may refer to the following locations:

- Yi County, Anhui (黟县), Huangshan, Anhui
- Yi County, Hebei (易县), Baoding, Hebei
- Yi County, Liaoning (义县), Jinzhou, Liaoning
- Yi County, Shandong (嶧縣), now Yicheng District, Zaozhuang
