= 1881 Shao =

Main-belt asteroid

Discovery
- Discovered by: K. Reinmuth
- Discovery site: Heidelberg Obs.
- Discovery date: 3 August 1940

Designations
- Named after: Cheng-yuan Shao (Chinese astronomer)
- Alternative designations: 1940 PC · 1968 OO
- Minor planet category: main-belt · (outer) background

Orbital characteristics
- Epoch 23 March 2018 (JD 2458200.5)
- Uncertainty parameter 0
- Observation arc: 77.71 yr (28,385 d)
- Aphelion: 3.5061 AU
- Perihelion: 2.8339 AU
- Semi-major axis: 3.1700 AU
- Eccentricity: 0.1060
- Orbital period (sidereal): 5.64 yr (2,062 d)
- Mean anomaly: 314.29°
- Mean motion: 0° 10^{m} 28.56^{s} / day
- Inclination: 9.8706°
- Longitude of ascending node: 218.07°
- Argument of perihelion: 66.640°

Physical characteristics
- Mean diameter: 24.083±0.134 km 25.437±0.176 km 25.46±0.86 km 29.21 km (calculated)
- Synodic rotation period: 5.61±0.07 h 7.452±0.002 h
- Geometric albedo: 0.057 (assumed); 0.0994±0.0087; 0.111±0.010; 0.115±0.009
- Spectral type: C (assumed)
- Absolute magnitude (H): 11.10; 11.19±0.04 (R); 11.4; 11.65±0.25

1881 Shao, provisional designation 1940 PC or 1968 OO, is a background asteroid from the outer regions of the asteroid belt, approximately 25 kilometers (16 miles) in diameter. It was discovered on 3 August 1940, by German astronomer Karl Reinmuth at the Heidelberg Observatory in southwest Germany. The presumed C-type asteroid has a rotation period of 7.45 hours. It was named for Chinese astronomer Cheng-yuan Shao.

== Orbit and classification ==
Shao is a non-family asteroid from the main belt's background population. It orbits the Sun in the outer main-belt at a distance of 2.8–3.5 AU once every 5 years and 8 months (2,062 days; semi-major axis of 3.17 AU). Its orbit has an eccentricity of 0.11 and an inclination of 10° with respect to the ecliptic. The body's observation arc begins with its official discovery observation at Heidelberg in 1940.

== Physical characteristics ==
Shao is an assumed carbonaceous C-type asteroid.

=== Rotation period ===
In July 2013, a rotational lightcurve of Shao was obtained from photometric observations by Italian amateur astronomer Silvano Casulli. Lightcurve analysis gave a rotation period of 7.452 hours with a brightness variation of 0.15 magnitude (U=2). A second lightcurve by astronomers at the Palomar Transient Factory from December 2014, gave a shorter period of 5.61 hours and an amplitude of 0.11 (U=2), indicative for a rather spherical shape.

=== Diameter and albedo ===
According to the surveys carried out by the Japanese Akari satellite and the NEOWISE mission of NASA's Wide-field Infrared Survey Explorer, Shao measures between 24.083 and 25.46 kilometers in diameter and its surface has an albedo between 0.0994 and 0.115. The Collaborative Asteroid Lightcurve Link assumes a standard albedo for a carbonaceous asteroid of 0.057, and calculates a diameter of 29.21 kilometers based on an absolute magnitude of 11.4.

== Naming ==
This minor planet was named after Chinese astronomer Cheng-yuan Shao (born 1927), an assistant to Richard McCrosky (see previously numbered 1880 McCrosky) in Harvard's minor-planet program at the Harvard–Smithsonian Center for Astrophysics and Oak Ridge Observatory in Massachusetts, United States. Shao was also involved in the recovery of near-Earth asteroid 1862 Apollo. The official naming citation was published by the Minor Planet Center on 20 February 1976 (M.P.C. 3936).
