= EY =

EY, Ey, or ey may refer to:

== Companies ==
- Ernst & Young, a global network of financial services firms currently branded EY
- Eagle Air (Tanzania) (IATA code 1999–2002)
- Etihad Airways (IATA code since 2003)

== People ==
- Henri Ey, French psychiatrist
- Elaine Youngs, American beach volleyball player

== Other uses ==
- Ey, an obsolete term for egg.
- Ey, a Spivak pronoun used in place of "he/she"
- Ey, exayear, SI unit for 1×10^{18} year
- ey (digraph), in languages
- -ey (disambiguation), an English diminutive suffix
- East York, Ontario ("EY" in an old logo)
- Executive Yuan, the executive branch of the Republic of China (Taiwan)
