= Yi (philosophy) =

Concept in Confucianism

Chinese name
- Traditional Chinese: 義
- Simplified Chinese: 义
Transcriptions
Standard Mandarin
- Hanyu Pinyin: yì
- Bopomofo: ㄧˋ
- Wade–Giles: i^{4}
- Tongyong Pinyin: yì
- IPA: [î]
Yue: Cantonese
- Yale Romanization: yih
- Jyutping: ji6
- IPA: [ji˨]

Vietnamese name
- Vietnamese: nghĩa
- Chữ Hán: 義

Korean name
- Hangul: 의
- Hanja: 義
Transcriptions
- Revised Romanization: ui

Japanese name
- Kanji: 義
- Hiragana: ぎ
Transcriptions
- Romanization: gi

In Chinese philosophy, yi (simplified Chinese: 义; traditional Chinese: 義; pinyin: yì) refers to righteousness, justice, morality, and meaning.

== Confucianism ==
In Confucianism, yi involves a moral disposition to do good, and also the intuition and sensibility to do so competently. Yi represents moral acumen which goes beyond simple rule following, involving a balanced understanding of a situation, and the "creative insight" and decision-generating ability necessary to apply virtues properly and appropriately in a situation with no loss of sight of the total good.

Yi resonates with Confucian philosophy's orientation towards the cultivation of benevolence (ren) and ritual propriety (li).

In application, yi is a "complex principle" which includes:

1. skill in crafting actions which have moral fitness according to a given concrete situation
2. the wise recognition of such fitness
3. the intrinsic satisfaction that comes from that recognition

== Daoism ==
The Zhuangzi discusses the relationship between yi (righteousness) and de (virtue).

== See also ==
- De (Chinese)
- Moral character
- Phronesis

== Bibliography ==
- Archie, Lee C. (30 October 2000). "The Main Concepts of Confucianism". philosophy.lander.edu. Lander University.
- Cheng, Chung-ying (July 1972), "On yi as a universal principle of specific application in Confucian morality", Philosophy East and West, 22 (3): 269–280, doi:10.2307/1397676, JSTOR 1397676
- Watson, Burton (1968). The complete works of Chuang Tzu. New York: Columbia University Press. ISBN 9780231031479.
