= Chinese family of scripts =

Writing systems descended from oracle bone script

"Chinese character" written using traditional (left) and simplified (right) character forms

The Chinese family of scripts (汉字系文字) includes writing systems used to write various East Asian languages, that ultimately descend from the oracle bone script invented in the Yellow River valley during the Shang dynasty. These include written Chinese itself, as well as adaptations of it for other languages, such as Japanese kanji, Korean hanja, Vietnamese chữ Hán and chữ Nôm, Zhuang sawndip, and Bai bowen. More divergent are the Tangut script, Khitan large script, Khitan small script and its offspring, the Jurchen script, as well as the Yi script, Sui script, and Geba syllabary, which were inspired by written Chinese but not descended directly from it. While written Chinese and many of its descendant scripts are logographic, others are phonetic, including the kana, Nüshu, and Lisu syllabaries, as well as the bopomofo semi-syllabary.

These scripts are written in various styles, principally seal script, clerical script, regular script, semi-cursive script, and cursive script. Adaptations range from the conservative, as in Korean, which used Chinese characters in their standard form with only a few local coinages, and relatively conservative Japanese, which has coined a few hundred new characters and used traditional character forms until the mid-20th century, to the extensive adaptations of Zhuang and Vietnamese, each coining over 10,000 new characters by Chinese formation principles, to the highly divergent Tangut script, which formed over 5,000 new characters by its own principles.

== Written Chinese ==
=== Origins ===
Ox scapula bearing oracle bone script, the common ancestor system of the Chinese family of scripts

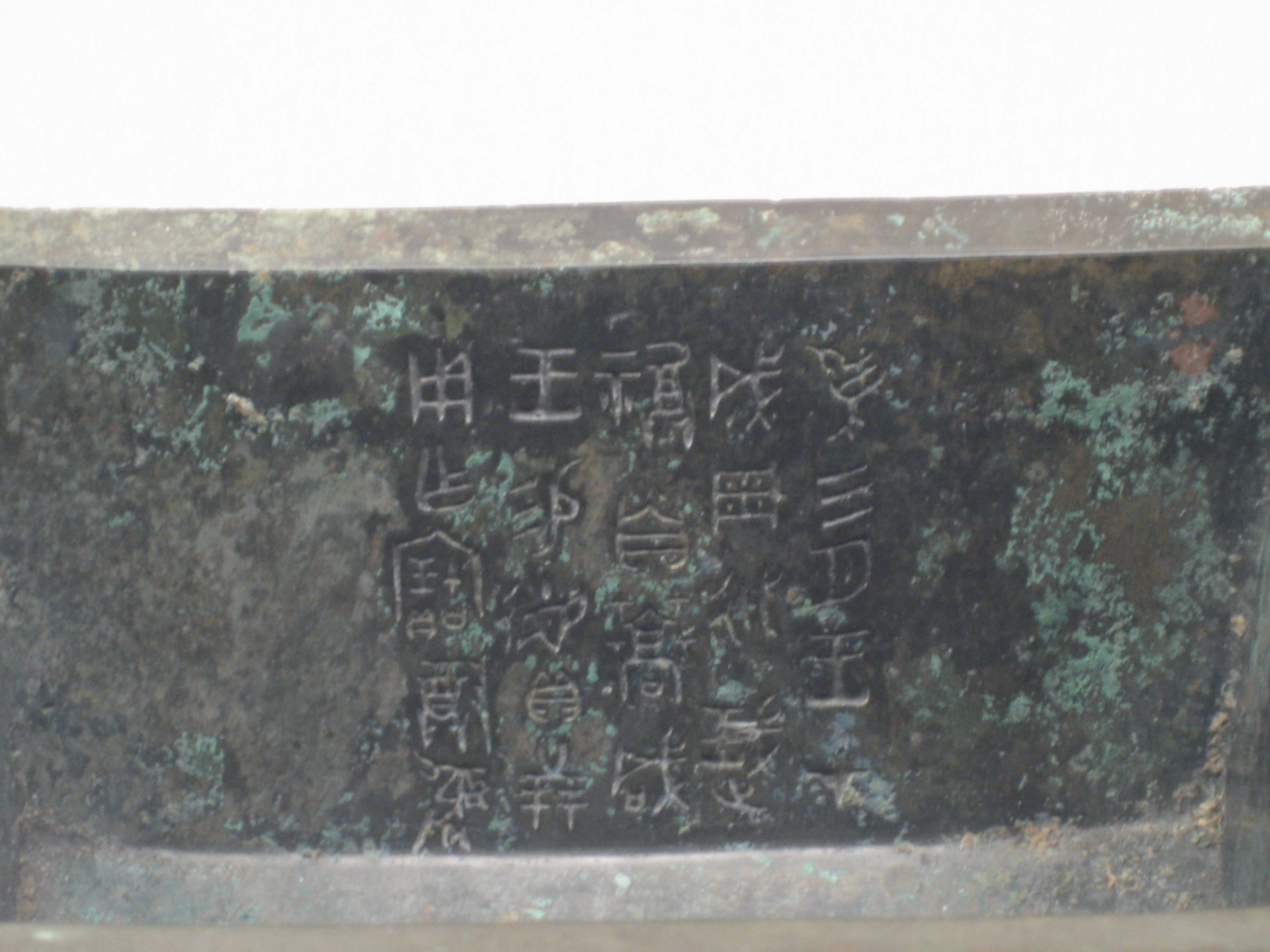
An example of Chinese bronze inscriptions on a bronze vessel – early Western Zhou (11th century BC)

The earliest known examples of Chinese writing are oracle bone inscriptions made c. 1200 BC at Yin (near modern Anyang), the site of the final capital of the Shang dynasty (c. 1600 – c. 1046 BC). These inscriptions were carved into ox scapulae and tortoise plastrons, and recorded the results of official divinations conducted by the Shang royal house. The script shows extensive simplification and linearization, believed by most researchers to indicate an extensive development of the script prior to the oldest samples. While various symbols inscribed on pieces of pottery, jade, and bone have been found at Neolithic sites across China, there is no clear evidence of any relation to Shang oracle bone script. Inscriptions on bronze vessels using a developed form of the Shang script dating to c. 1100 BC have also been discovered, and have provided a richer corpus.

Each character of the early script represents an Old Chinese word, which were uniformly monosyllabic at that time. Characters are traditionally classified according to a system of six categories (六書; liùshū; 'six writings') according to the apparent strategy used to create them. This system was first made popular by the Shuowen Jiezi dictionary (c. 100 AD). Three of these categories involved a representation of the meaning of the word:

1. Pictograms (象形字; xiàngxíngzì) represent a word by a picture—later stylized—such as 日; rì; 'Sun', 人; rén; 'person' and 木; mù; 'tree'.
2. Ideograms (指事字; zhǐshìzì) are abstract symbols such as 三; sān; 'three' and 上; shàng; 'up'.
3. Semantic compounds (會意字; huìyìzì) combine simpler elements to indicate the meaning of the word, as in 林; lín; 'grove', composed of two 木.

Characters directly descendant of these forms remain still among the most commonly used today.

Words that could not be represented pictorially, such as abstract terms and grammatical particles, were denoted using the rebus strategy, selecting characters for similar-sounding words. Thus, these phonetic loans (假借字; jiǎjièzì) are new uses of existing characters rather than new graphic forms. An example is 來; lái; 'come', written with the character for a similar-sounding word meaning 'wheat'. The borrowed character was sometimes modified slightly to distinguish it from the original, as with 毋; wú; 'do not', a borrowing of 母; mǔ; 'mother'.

Phono-semantic compounds (形聲字; xíngshēngzì) were obtained by adding semantic indicators to disambiguate phonetic loans. This type was already used extensively on the oracle bones, and has been the main source of new characters since then. For example, the character 其 originally representing jī; 'winnowing basket' was also used to write the pronoun and modal particle qí. Later the less common original word was written with the compound 箕, obtained by adding the symbol 竹; zhú; 'bamboo' to the character. Sometimes the original phonetic similarity has been obscured by millennia of sound change, as in 格; gé < *krak 'go to' and 路; lù < *graks 'road'. Many characters often explained as semantic compounds were originally phono-semantic compounds that have been obscured in this way. Some authors even dispute the validity of the semantic compound category.

The sixth traditional category (轉注字; zhuǎnzhùzì) contains very few characters; its meaning is uncertain.

=== Styles ===
Development and simplification of the script continued during the Western Zhou and Spring and Autumn periods, with characters becoming less pictorial and more linear and regular, with rounded strokes being replaced by sharp angles. Writing became more widespread during the Warring States period, as well as further simplified and more varied, particularly in the eastern states. After the western state of Qin unified China, its more conservative seal script became the standard across the entire country. A simplified form known as clerical script became the standard during the Han dynasty, and later evolved into regular script, which remains in use. At the same time, semi-cursive and cursive scripts developed.

The traditional Chinese script is currently used in Taiwan, Hong Kong and Macau. Mainland China and Singapore use the simplified Chinese variant.

=== Dialectal writing ===
Until the early 20th century, formal writing employed Literary Chinese, based on the vocabulary and syntax of the Chinese classics. The script was also used less formally to record local varieties, which had over time diverged from the classical language and each other. The logographic script easily accommodated differences in pronunciation, meaning and word order, but often new characters were required for words that could not be related to older forms. Many such characters were created using the traditional methods, particularly phono-semantic compounds.

For many centuries, the Chinese script was the only writing system in East Asia, and had a huge influence as the vehicle for the dominance of Chinese culture. Korea, Japan and Vietnam adopted Chinese literary culture as a whole. For many centuries, all writing in neighbouring countries was in Literary Chinese, albeit influenced by the writer's native language. Although they wrote in Chinese, writing about local subjects required characters to represent names of local people and places; leading to the creation of Han characters specific to other languages, some of which were later re-imported as Chinese characters. Later they sought to use the script to write their own languages. Chinese characters were adapted to represent the words of other languages using a range of strategies, including

- representing loans from Chinese using their original characters,
- representing words with characters for similar-sounding Chinese words,
- representing words with characters for Chinese words with similar meanings,
- creating new characters using the same formation principles as Chinese characters, especially phono-semantic compounds, and
- creating new characters in other ways, such as compounds of pairs of characters indicating the pronunciation of the initial and final parts of a word respectively (similar to Chinese fanqie spellings).

The principle of representing one monosyllabic word with one character was readily applied to neighbouring languages to the south with a similar analytic structure to Chinese, such as Vietnamese and Zhuang. The script was a poorer fit for the polysyllabic agglutinative languages of the north-east, such as Korean, Japanese and the Mongolic and Tungusic languages.

== Japanese ==
Katakana with man'yōgana equivalents (segments of man'yōgana adapted into katakana shown in red, retroactive, ye, yi, and wu not present)

Development of hiragana from man'yōgana (retroactive, ye, yi, and wu not present)

Chinese characters adapted to write Japanese words are known as kanji. Chinese words borrowed into Japanese could be written with the Chinese character, while Japanese words could be written using the character for a Chinese word of similar meaning. Because there have been multiple layers of borrowing into Japanese, a single kanji may have several readings in Japanese.

Other systems, known as kana, used Chinese characters phonetically to transcribe the sounds of Japanese syllables. An early system of this type was man'yōgana, as used in the 8th-century anthology Man'yōshū. This system was not quite a syllabary, because each Japanese syllable could be represented by one of several characters, but from it were derived two syllabaries still in use today. They differ because they sometimes selected different characters for a syllable, and because they used different strategies to reduce these characters for easy writing: the angular katakana were obtained by selecting a part of each character, while hiragana were derived from the cursive forms of whole characters. Such classic works as Lady Murasaki's The Tale of Genji were written in hiragana, the only system permitted to women of the time.

Modern Japanese writing employs a composite script system consisting of kanji, hiragana, and katakana. Kanji are used primarily for content words such as nouns, verb stems, and adjective stems. Hiragana is employed for grammatical elements, such as inflectional endings and function words, as well as for some native Japanese words that lack commonly used kanji or whose kanji are considered obscure or difficult to write. Katakana is typically used to transcribe foreign (non-Sino-Japanese) loanwords, represent onomatopoeic expressions, render colloquial or informal terms, indicate emphasis (similar to italics or capitalization in English), and provide alternative spellings for certain words. A few hundred characters have been coined in Japan; these are known as kokuji, and include natural phenomena, particularly fish, such as 鰯; 'sardine', together with everyday terms such as 働; 'work' and technical terms such as 腺; 'gland'.

== Korean ==
Chinese characters adapted to write Korean are known as Hanja. From the 9th century, Korean was written using a number of systems collectively known as Idu, in which Hanja were used to write both Sino-Korean and native Korean roots, and a smaller number of Hanja were used to write Korean grammatical morphemes with similar sounds. The overlapping uses of Hanja made the system complex and difficult to use, even when reduced forms for grammatical morphemes were introduced with the Gugyeol system in the 13th and 14th centuries.

The Hangul alphabet introduced in the 15th century was much simpler, and specifically designed for the sounds of Korean. The alphabet makes systematic use of modifiers corresponding to features of Korean sounds. Although Hangul is unrelated to Chinese characters, its letters are written in syllabic blocks that can be interspersed with Hanja. Such a Korean mixed script became the usual way of writing the language, with roots of Chinese origin denoted by Hanja and all other elements rendered in Hangul. Hanja is still used (but not very commonly like the Japanese) and is required in both North and South Korea.

Historically, a few characters known as gukja were coined in Korea; one example is 畓 'rice paddy'.

== Vietnamese ==
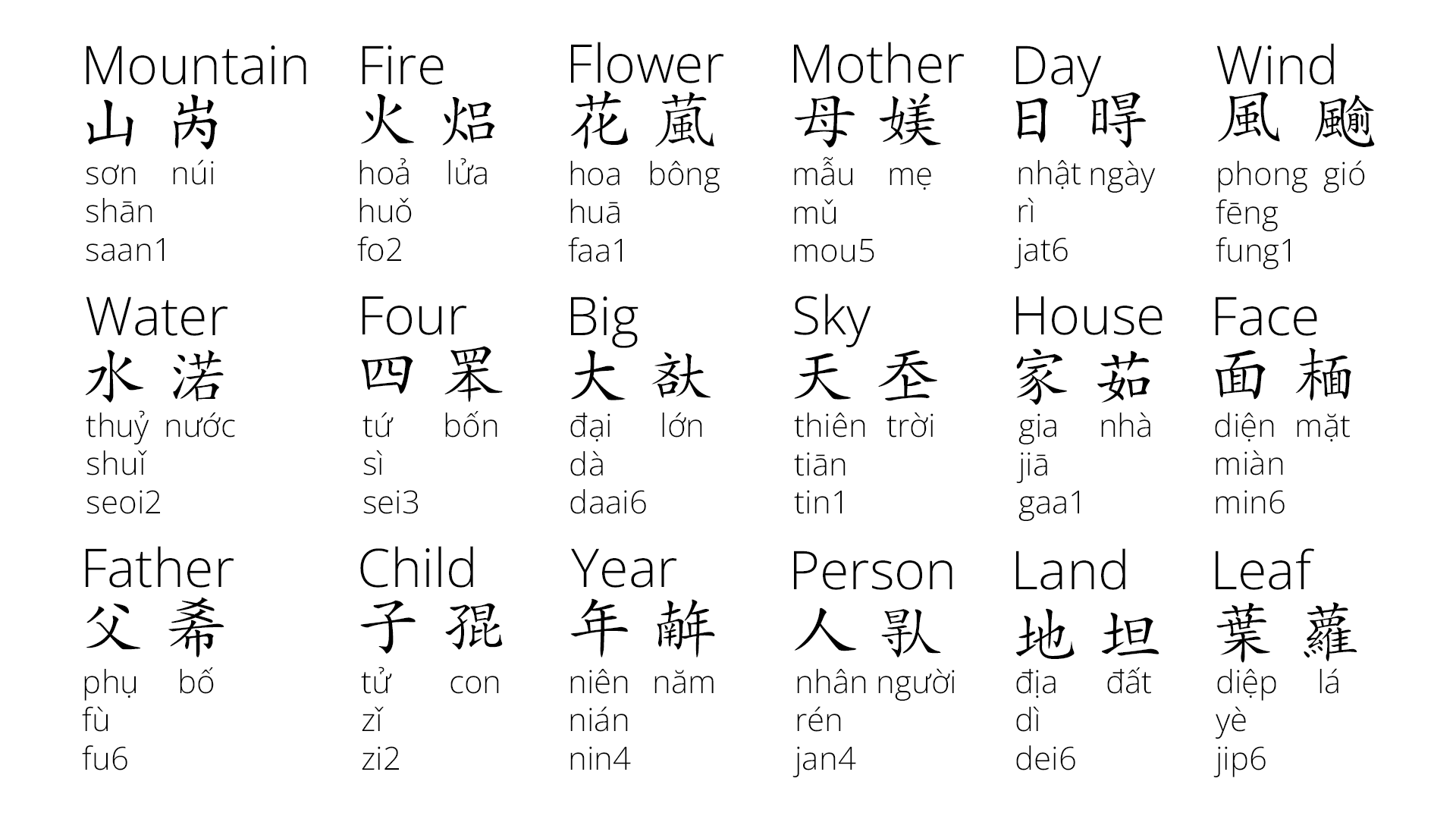
A comparison between Sino-Vietnamese vocabulary (left) with Mandarin and Cantonese pronunciations below and native Vietnamese vocabulary (right).

Vietnamese was first written from the 13th century using the chữ Nôm script based on Chinese characters, but the system developed in a quite different way than in Korea or Japan. Vietnamese was and is a strongly analytic language with many distinct syllables (roughly 4,800 in the modern standard language), so there was little motivation to develop a syllabary. As with Korean and Japanese, characters were used to write borrowed Chinese words, native words with a similar sound and native words with a similar meaning. In the Vietnamese case, the latter category consisted mainly of early loans from Chinese that had come to be accepted as native. The Vietnamese system also involved creation of new characters using Chinese principles, but on a far greater scale than in Korea or Japan. The resulting system was highly complex and was never mastered by more than 5% of the population. It was completely replaced in the 20th century by the Latin-based Vietnamese alphabet.

== Zhuang ==
Zhuang has been written using Sawndip for over a thousand years. The script uses both Chinese characters and new characters formed using the traditional methods, as well as some formed by combining pairs of characters to indicate the pronunciation of a word by the fanqie method. The number of new created characters is similar in scale to the chữ Nôm of Vietnam. Even though an official alphabet-based writing system for Zhuang was introduced in 1957, Sawndip is still more often used in less formal situations.

== Others ==
Several peoples in southwest China recorded laws, songs and other religious and cultural texts by representing words of their languages using a mix of Chinese characters with a similar sound or meaning, or pairs of Chinese characters indicating pronunciation using the fanqie method. The languages so recorded included Miao, Yao, Bouyei, Kam, Bai and Hani. All these languages are now written using Latin-based scripts.

Chinese characters were also used to transcribe the Mongolian text of The Secret History of the Mongols.

== Descendant scripts by type ==
Logographic
Oracle bone script, seal script, clerical script, standard script, semi-cursive script, cursive script, traditional Chinese, simplified Chinese, Zetian characters, bowen, sawndip, chữ Hán, chữ Nôm, hanja and kanji.

Syllabary
Hiragana, katakana, man'yōgana and Nüshu.

Semi-syllabary
Zhuyin Fuhao, gugyeol, hyangchal, idu.

== Non-descendant related scripts ==
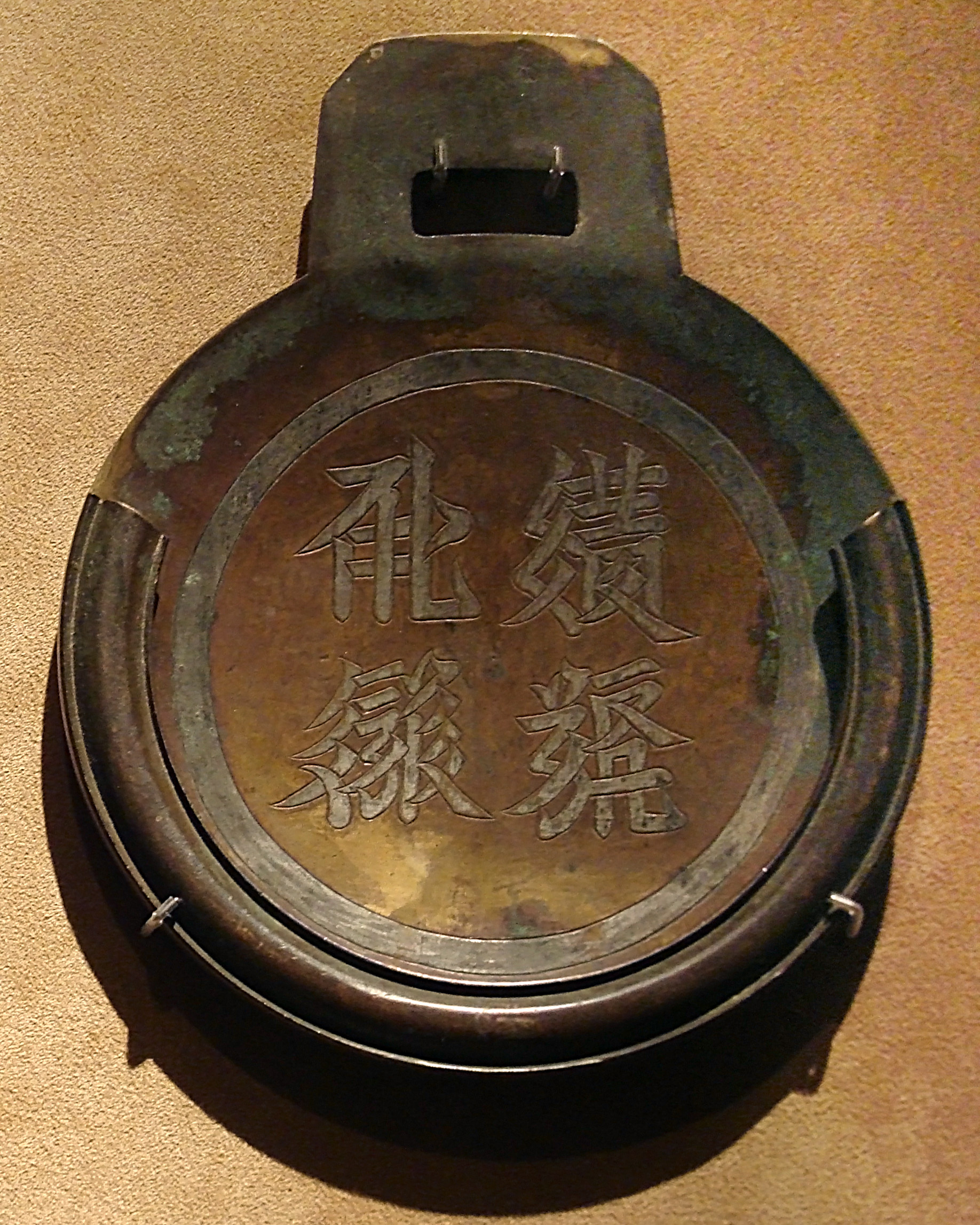
Bronze edict plate with Tangut characters

Between the 10th and 13th centuries, northern China was ruled by foreign dynasties that created scripts for their own languages. The Khitan large script and Khitan small script, which in turn influenced the Tangut script and Jurchen script, used characters that superficially resemble Chinese characters, but with the exception of a few loans were constructed using quite different principles. In particular the Khitan small script contained phonetic sub-elements arranged in a square block in a manner similar to the more sophisticated Hangul system devised later for Korean.

Other scripts in China that borrowed or adapted some Chinese characters but are otherwise distinct include Ba–Shu scripts Geba script, Sui script, Yi script and the Lisu syllabary.

== See also ==
- Chinese character encoding
- Mojikyō
