= Ye (kana) =

Character of the Japanese writing system

ye

hiragana	katakana
	alternate katakana
- transliteration: e, ye
- hiragana origin: 江
- katakana origin: 江
- another katakana origin: 延
- Man'yōgana: 延 曳 睿 叡 盈 要 縁 裔 兄 柄 枝 吉 江 遥
- unicode: U+1B001

Ye (hiragana: 𛀁, katakana: エ, sometimes also written as 𛄡) is a Japanese mora or a kana used to write it, no longer in standard use.

== History ==
It is presumed that 𛀁 would have represented [je]. In the 10th century, e and ye progressively merged into ye, and then during the Edo period the pronunciation changed from /je/ to /e/.

However, during the Meiji period, linguists almost unanimously agreed on the kana for ye, yi (𛀆), and wu (𛄟). Yi and wu are thought to have never occurred as morae in Japanese, and ye was merged with e (え).

== Characters ==
=== Nara period–Heian period ===
Japanese people separated e and ye in Man'yōgana, early Hiragana and early Katakana.

	e	ye
Man'yōgana	愛,哀,埃,衣,依,榎,荏,得,"可愛"	延,曳,睿,叡,盈,要,縁,裔,兄,柄,枝,吉,江
Hiragana	え etc.	etc.
Katakana	etc.	エ etc.

After that, e and ye merged into ye in the 10th century, before eventually evolving back to e.

=== Edo period–Meiji period ===
In the Edo period and the Meiji period, some Japanese linguists tried to separate kana e and kana ye again. The shapes of characters differed with each linguist. 𛀁 and 𛄡 were just two of many shapes.

They were phonetic symbols to fill in the blanks of the gojūon table, but Japanese people did not separate them in normal writing.

	e	ye
Traditional kana	え (Hiragana); (A variant form of え. Hiragana.); エ (Katakana)	え (Hiragana); 𛀁 (A variant form of え. Hiragana.); (A variant form of え. Hiragana.); (A variant form of え. Hiragana.); (A variant form of え. Hiragana.); エ (Katakana)
Constructed kana	(A part of 衣. Katakana.); (A part of 衣. Katakana.); (A part of 衣. Katakana.); (A part of 衣. Katakana.); (A part of 衣. Katakana.)	え゙ (え with dots. Hiragana.); エ゙ (エ with dots. Katakana.); (A part of 衣. Katakana.); (A part of 衣. Katakana.); (A part of 衣. Katakana.); 𛄡 (A part of 延. Katakana.); (A part of 兄. Katakana.); (A part of 延. Katakana.)

These suggestions were not accepted.

== Unicode ==
The hiragana version is encoded as HIRAGANA LETTER ARCHAIC YE (with the normative alias of HENTAIGANA LETTER E-1) in the position U+1B001. The katakana version is encoded as KATAKANA LETTER ARCHAIC YE, in the position of U+1B121. A small form, used in Shōwa-period linguistic works to transcribe Marshallese, was encoded in Unicode 18.0 (September 2026) as KATAKANA LETTER SMALL ARCHAIC YE at U+1B168 in the Small Kana Extension block.

== See also ==
- Early Middle Japanese
- Old Japanese
- Yi (kana)
- Wu (kana)
- Japanese dialects - some dialects, such as in Kyushu, pronounce "e" as "ye"
