= Chinese scripts =

Chinese scripts may refer to:

- Chinese family of scripts, the writing systems related to Chinese characters
- Chinese script styles, different styles of writing Chinese characters
