= Early Middle Japanese =

Stage of the Japanese language

- 日本語
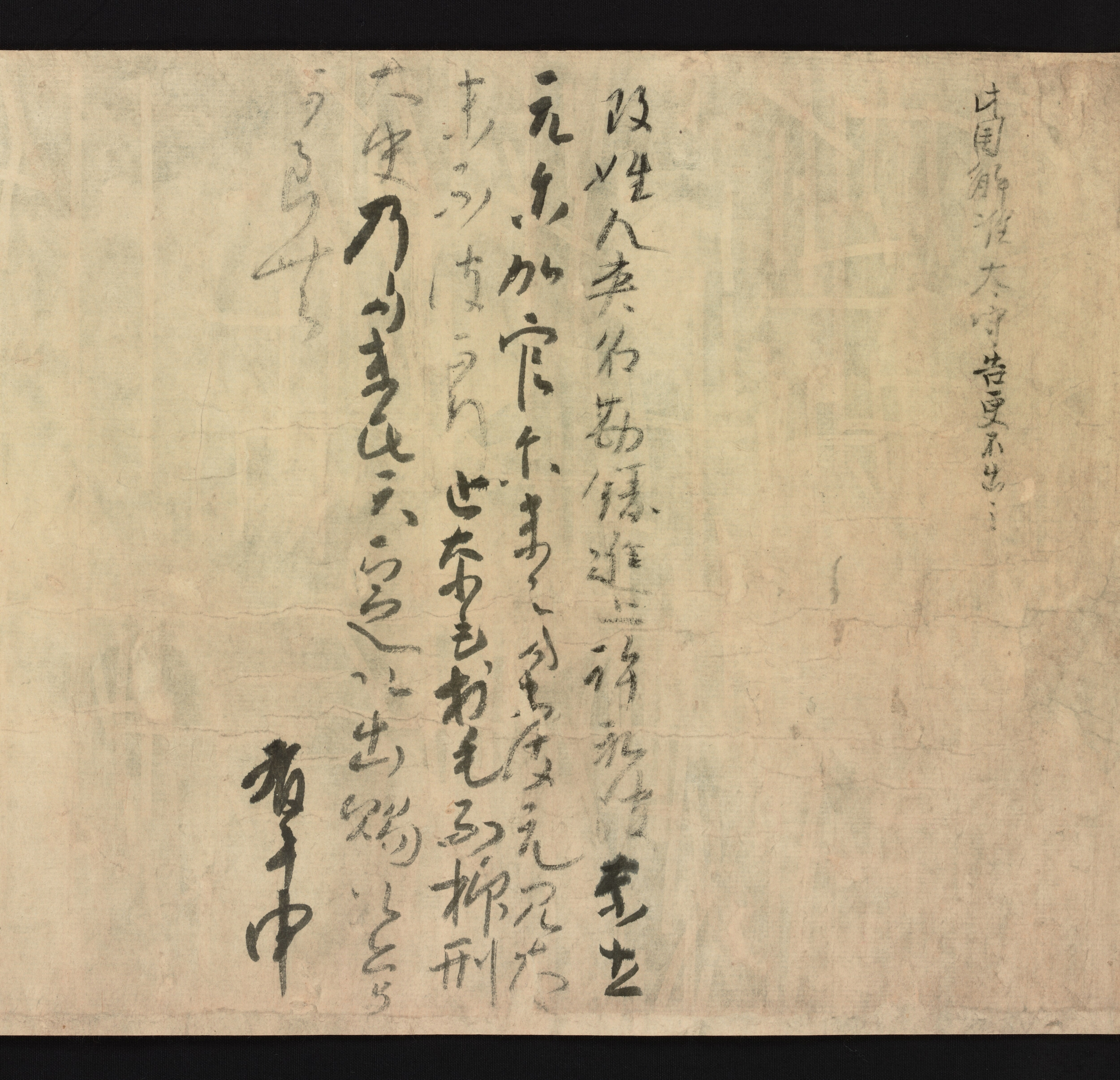
- The oldest cursive kana written in early Heian period, indicating the birth of hiragana from Man'yōgana
- Region: Japan
- Era: Evolved into Late Middle Japanese at the end of the 12th century
- Language family: Japonic: Japanese; Early Middle Japanese
- Early form: Old Japanese
- Writing system: Hiragana, Katakana, and Han

Language codes
- ISO 639-3: ojp (Old Japanese)
- Glottolog: None

Early Middle Japanese (中古日本語, Chūko-Nihongo) is a stage of the Japanese language between 794 and 1185, which is known as the Heian period (平安時代). The successor to Old Japanese (上代日本語), it is also known as Late Old Japanese. However, the term "Early Middle Japanese" is preferred, as it is closer to Late Middle Japanese (中世日本語, after 1185) than to Old Japanese (before 794).

== Background ==
Old Japanese had borrowed and adapted the Chinese script to write Japanese. In Early Middle Japanese, two new scripts emerged: the kana scripts hiragana and katakana. That development simplified writing and brought about a new age in literature, with many classics such as Tosa Nikki, The Tale of the Bamboo Cutter, The Tales of Ise, The Tale of Genji, and The Pillow Book.

== Writing system ==
Early Middle Japanese was written in three different ways. It was first recorded in Man'yōgana (万葉仮名), literally "ten thousand leaves borrowed labels", in reference to the Man'yōshū poetry anthology and the "borrowing" of the kanji characters as "labels" for the sounds of Japanese. Certain Chinese characters were borrowed to phonetically spell out Japanese sounds. Cursive handwriting gradually gave rise to the hiragana (平仮名, "flat/simple borrowed labels") and Buddhist shorthand practices of using pieces of kanji to denote the sounds then developed into the katakana (片仮名, "partial/piece borrowed labels").

Phoneme and Kana of Early Middle Japanese
phoneme Man'yō, hira, kata	Ø ア行	カ行		サ行		タ行		/n/ ナ行	ハ行		/m/ マ行	/j/ ヤ行	/r/ ラ行	/w/ ワ行
phoneme Man'yō, hira, kata	Ø ア行	/k/	/g/	/s/	/z/	/t/	/d/	/n/ ナ行	/ɸ/	/b/	/m/ マ行	/j/ ヤ行	/r/ ラ行	/w/ ワ行
/a/ ア段	/a/ 安、あ、ア	/ka/	/ga/	/sa/	/za/	/ta/	/da/	/na/ 奈、な、ナ	/ɸa/	/ba/	/ma/ 末、ま、マ	/ja/ 也、や、ヤ	/ra/ 良、ら、ラ	/wa/ 和、わ、ワ
/a/ ア段	/a/ 安、あ、ア	加、か、カ		左、さ、サ		太、た、タ		/na/ 奈、な、ナ	波、は、ハ		/ma/ 末、ま、マ	/ja/ 也、や、ヤ	/ra/ 良、ら、ラ	/wa/ 和、わ、ワ
/i/ イ段	/i/ 以、い、イ	/ki/	/gi/	/si/	/zi/	/ti/	/di/	/ni/ 仁、に、ニ	/ɸi/	/bi/	/mi/ 美、み、ミ	Ø	/ri/ 利、り、リ	/wi/ 爲、ゐ、ヰ
/i/ イ段	/i/ 以、い、イ	幾、き、キ		之、し、シ		知、ち、チ		/ni/ 仁、に、ニ	比、ひ、ヒ		/mi/ 美、み、ミ	Ø	/ri/ 利、り、リ	/wi/ 爲、ゐ、ヰ
/u/ ウ段	/u/ 宇、う、ウ	/ku/	/gu/	/su/	/zu/	/tu/	/du/	/nu/ 奴、ぬ、ヌ	/ɸu/	/bu/	/mu/ 武、む、ム	/ju/ 由、ゆ、ユ	/ru/ 留、る、ル	Ø
/u/ ウ段	/u/ 宇、う、ウ	久、く、ク		寸、す、ス		川、つ、ツ		/nu/ 奴、ぬ、ヌ	不、ふ、フ		/mu/ 武、む、ム	/ju/ 由、ゆ、ユ	/ru/ 留、る、ル	Ø
/e/ エ段	/e/ 衣、え、𛀀	/ke/	/ge/	/se/	/ze/	/te/	/de/	/ne/ 禰、ね、ネ	/ɸe/	/be/	/me/ 女、め、メ	/je/ 江、𛀁、エ	/re/ 礼、れ、レ	/we/ 惠、ゑ、ヱ
/e/ エ段	/e/ 衣、え、𛀀	計、け、ケ		世、せ、セ		天、て、テ		/ne/ 禰、ね、ネ	部、へ、ヘ		/me/ 女、め、メ	/je/ 江、𛀁、エ	/re/ 礼、れ、レ	/we/ 惠、ゑ、ヱ
/o/ お段	/o/ 於、お、オ	/ko/	/go/	/so/	/zo/	/to/	/do/	/no/ 乃、の、ノ	/ɸo/	/bo/	/mo/ 毛、も、モ	/jo/ 與、よ、ヨ	/ro/ 呂、ろ、ロ	/wo/ 遠、を、ヲ
/o/ お段	/o/ 於、お、オ	己、こ、コ		曽、そ、ソ		止、と、ト		/no/ 乃、の、ノ	保、ほ、ホ		/mo/ 毛、も、モ	/jo/ 與、よ、ヨ	/ro/ 呂、ろ、ロ	/wo/ 遠、を、ヲ

It is worth noting that the man'yōgana in each cell only indicates one of many contemporary options for spelling each Japanese mora – in the table above, each chosen character is the direct origin of the corresponding modern hiragana. See also Hentaigana for a fuller description of how multiple hiragana could be used to spell a single sound. Also note that hiragana forms were not standardized at that time.

Although man'yōgana specify different kanji to represent voiced phonemes versus unvoiced phonemes, it is not until the Meiji period that we see standardized usage of the dakuten diacritic ゛ to explicitly mark voicing for hiragana and katakana.

Japan officially adopted simplified shinjitai (新字体, "new character forms") in 1946 as part of a round of orthographic reforms intended to improve literacy rates. The so-called kyūjitai (旧字体, "old character forms") are equivalent to Traditional Chinese characters, and these forms were the ones used in historical man'yōgana. Modern transcriptions of classical texts are predominantly written in shinjitai. To avoid unnecessary ambiguity, quotes from classical texts would be written in kyūjitai.

Additionally, there are many spelling differences between Modern Japanese and Early Middle Japanese even for the same word. For example, 万葉集 is spelled in modern Japanese hiragana as まんようしゅう (man'yōshū), while in Early Middle Japanese, this would have been まんえふしふ (man'yefushifu). Details on these spelling rules are helpful for understanding historical kana usage.

== Phonology ==
=== Developments ===
Major phonological changes were characteristic of the period.

The most prominent difference was the loss of certain spelling distinctions found in the Jōdai Tokushu Kanazukai ("Ancient Special Kana Usage"), which distinguished two types of /i/, /e/, and /o/. While these distinctions had begun to blur already at the end of the Old Japanese stage, they were completely lost in Early Middle Japanese. The final distinction to be lost was /ko_{1}, go_{1}/ vs. /ko_{2}, go_{2}/. For example, around the year 800 in very early Early Middle Japanese, in the same text /ko_{1}/ was still represented by cursive 「古」, while /ko_{2}/ was represented by cursive 「己」.

In the 10th century, /e/ and /je/ progressively merged into /je/, and /o/ and /wo/ had merged into /wo/ by the 11th century.

An increase in Chinese loanwords had a number of phonological effects:

- Introduction of palatal and labial consonant clusters such as /kw/ and /kj/
- Introduction of the uvular nasal /ɴ/
- Length becoming a phonemic feature with the development of both long vowels and long consonants

The development of the uvular nasal and geminated consonants occurred late in the Heian period and brought about the introduction of closed syllables (CVC).

=== Phonetics ===
==== Vowels ====
- /a/: [a]
- /i/: [i]
- /u/: [u]
- /e/: [je]
- /o/: [wo]

==== Consonants ====
Consonant phonemes
	Bilabial		Alveolar		Palatal	Velar	
Nasal		m		n			
Stop	(p)	b	t	d		k	ɡ
Fricative	ɸ		s	z			
Liquid				r			
Approximant					j		w

==== Phonetic realization ====
===== /s, z/ =====
Theories for the realization of /s, z/ include [s, z], [ts, dz], and [ɕ, ʑ]. It may have varied depending on the following vowel, as in Modern Japanese.

===== /ɸ/ =====
By the 11th century, /ɸ/ had merged with /w/ between vowels.

== Grammar ==
Syntactically, Early Middle Japanese was a subject–object–verb language with a topic-comment structure. Morphologically, it was an agglutinative language.

=== Phrase ===
A paragraph of Early Middle Japanese can be divided into the following units from large to small.

- Sentence (文(ぶん)) ：A series of meaningful words divided from a paragraph by 「。」(period).

今(いま)は昔(むかし)、竹(たけ)取(とり)の翁(おきな)といふ者(もの)ありけり。
(from The Tale of the Bamboo Cutter)
Romanization: ima fa mukasi, taketori no okina to ifu mono arikeri.
Modern Japanese translation：今からみるともう昔のことだが、竹取の翁という者がいた。
English translation: Long before the present, it is said that there was someone called Old Man Bamboo Cutter.
The noun「昔(むかし)」("long past") is actually a predicate (means "is long past"). The predicate is not necessarily a verb in Early Middle Japanese.

- Phrase (文(ぶん)節(せつ)): The smallest unit naturally divided from the rest of a sentence by its meaning.

今は 昔、 竹取の 翁と いふ 者 ありけり。

The function of the auxiliary particle「は」is to highlight the noun「今」(now), which cannot be separately explained, so they should be in the same phrase. Similarly, the particle 「の 」 represents the relation between the modifier「竹取」("bamboo cutter", a compound noun) and the modified noun 「翁」(old man), like the preposition "of". Additionally, the particle 「と」 connects the called name 「翁」(modified by 「竹取」) to the verb「いふ」( "call"), just like a preposition. As for the auxiliary verb「けり」, it further clarifies that what the verb「あり」 ("be, exist") describes is a rumor about the past, but not a direct experience (i.e. 間(かん)接(せつ)過(か)去(こ)), so it should be included in the same phrase as 「あり」. In contrast, even if the verb 「いふ」 does modify the noun「者」 ("someone"), its meaning can still be realized naturally without any help from other words.

- Word (単(たん)語(ご)): The smallest grammatical unit.

今 は 昔、 竹取 の 翁 と いふ 者 あり けり。
Although 「竹取」is a combination of the noun 「竹(たけ)」and the verb 「取(と)り」("get", infinitive), any compound noun, verb, or adjective should be considered as a single grammatical unit.

=== Classes of words ===
Words were classified as follows:

- Cannot stand alone as a phrase
  - (Auxiliary) particle (助(じょ) 詞(し)): Without inflection. Has various functions like emphasis, acting like a postposition, hinting about the subject or expressing interrogative mood.
  - Auxiliary verb (助(じょ)動(どう) 詞(し)): With inflection. Describes additional information of Yougen like tense, aspect, mood, voice, and polarity. Alternate descriptions include grammaticalized verb or Verb-like ending.
- Can stand alone as phrase
  - Without inflection
    - Cannot be subject
      - Adverb(副(ふく) 詞(し)): mainly modifies Yougen.
      - Conjunction (接(せつ)続(ぞく)詞(し))
      - Interjection (感(かん)動(どう)詞(し))
      - Rentaisi (連(れん)体(たい)詞(し)): mainly modifies Taigen.
    - Can be subject: Taigen (体(たい)言(げん), the words that are the main body of the sentence)
      - Noun (名(めい) 詞(し))
      - Pronoun (代(だい) 名(めい) 詞(し))
      - Number (数(すう) 詞(し))
  - With inflection: Yougen (用(よう)言(げん), the words to predicate or to "use" other words)
    - Verb (動(どう) 詞(し))
    - Adjective (形(けい)容(よう) 詞(し)): actually the stative verbs.
    - Adjective verb (形(けい)容(よう)動(どう) 詞(し)): a different kind of "adjective", which is derived from a noun. Hence also referred to as adjectival noun in English.

=== Auxiliary particle ===
(Auxiliary) Particles had various functions, and they can be classified as follows:

Class of particle	Functions	Example (Particle is labeled in red.)
Case particles 格(かく)助(じょ)詞(し)	indicating the relationship between a phrase and its following phrase. (i.e. not limited to nouns, so slightly differs from "case" in English)	いづ 方(かた)へか 罷(まか)りぬる(The Tale of Genji); In which direction of escape has gone (the bird)? (The verb 「罷る」 is the polite form, i.e.「丁寧語」, of the verb 「行(い)く」"go")
Conjunctive particles 接(せつ)続(ぞく)助(じょ)詞(し)	indicating the relationship between clauses.	文(ふみ)を書(か)きてやれども返(かへ)り事(こと)もせず。(The Tale of the Bamboo Cutter); Even though「文を書きてやれ」, but 「返り事もせず」. (「ども」has to be preceded by the realis mood, e.g.,「やれ」is the realis mood of the verb「やる」, to express the appropriate meaning.)
Adverbial particles 副(ふく)助(じょ)詞(し)	mainly modifying its following yougen.	ただ浪の白(しろ)きのみぞ見(み)ゆる (Tosa Nikki)...can only see (exactly) the white wave (actually, 「のみ」 limits the expressive range of 「見ゆる」) (The verb 「見ゆ」is "bound" by the binding particle 「ぞ」, so it occurs in the attributive form「見ゆる」.)
Binding particles 係(かかり)助(じょ)詞(し)	emphasizing its phrase or making it interrogative, and limiting the inflection form of the ending yougen or auxiliary verb.	いづ 方へか 罷りぬる; In which direction of escape has gone (the bird)? (The perfect auxiliary verb「ぬ」is "bound" by the binding particle 「か」, so it occurs in the attributive form 「ぬる」.)
Final particles 終(しゅ)助(じょ)詞(し)	mainly at the end of sentence, indicating many kinds of moods (e.g. interrogative mood, emotive assertion)	我(われ)はこの比(ごろ)惡(わろ)きぞかし(Sarashina Nikki); At that time I'm definitely not good! (Although the binding particle 「ぞ」 is at the end of sentence, it still requires its preceding words to be attributive.)
Interjectory particles 間(かん)投(とう)助(じょ)詞(し)	similar to final particle, but occurs more freely, and is often used as a short stop between sentences.	朝(あ)臣(そん)や。さやうの落(お)ち葉(ば)をだに拾(ひろ)へ (The Tale of Genji) (Yugiri) Ason! At least pick these kinds of falling leaves up!

==== Case particle ====
- 「が」 (ga) and 「の」 (no) : "of, ...'s". It hints the present of subject, relation of modification between phrases or nouns.
- 「を」(wo) (accusative). Optional.
- 「に」(ni) (dative/locative). It had a wide range of functions ('to' or 'for' a person; 'by' an agent'; 'at' or 'to' a place; 'at' a time), and in some uses, especially when indicating time, it was optional.
- 「より」(yori) (ablative).
- 「まで」(made) (terminative: 'until'; 'as far as').
- 「と」(to) (comitative: 'with'; essive 'as').
- 「へ」(fe) (allative: 'to'). 「へ」 was derived from the noun「 邊(へ)」'vicinity; direction', which 「わ」 occasionally found in the location noun structure Noun + 「の」 + Location Noun to mean 'near', or in the noun-deriving suffix 「べ」 (< 「のへ」) in such words as 水(みづ)べ 'beside the water' .

The nominative function was marked by the absence of a particle in main clauses and by the genitive particles in subordinate clauses. The dative/locative particle -ni was homophonous with the simple infinitive form of the copula -ni, with verbal suffixes supplies more complex case markers -ni-te ('at' a place) and -ni si-te or -ni-te ('by means of'). A number of particle + verb + -te sequences provided other case functions: -ni yori-te 'due to' (from yor- 'depend'), -ni tuki-te 'about, concerning' (from tuk- 'be attached'), and -to si-te 'as' (from se- 'do'). More complex structures were derived from genitive particle + Location Noun + appropriate case particle (typically locative -ni) and were used particularly to express spatial and temporal relations. Major location nouns were mafe 'front' (Noun-no mafe-ni 'in front of Noun'), ufe 'top' (Noun-no ufe-ni 'on top of Noun' ~ 'above Noun'), sita 'under' (Noun-no sita-ni 'under Noun), saki 'ahead' (Noun-no saki-ni 'ahead of Noun)', etc.

==== Conjunctive particle ====
- Infinitive + 「て」(te): 'and (then/so), when, because'. It usually expressed a close sequential link between the predicates that it connects. The subjects of the two verbs connected by「て」 were usually the same.
- Realis + 「ば」(ba): 'and (then/so), when, because'. It usually expressed a looser sequential link between the predicates that it connected. The subject of both verbs connected by 「ば」 was usually different.
- Irrealis + 「ば」(ba): 'if...', It usually expressed an unreal condition.
- Irrealis + 「で」(de): negative 'and', 'without ... ing', 'rather than ... ', derived from old infinitive of negative auxiliary verb「ず」(i.e. 「に」) + the particle 「て」with sound change.
- Various forms + 「と/とも」 (do / domo): 'even if, even though'. Most yougens and auxiliary verbs took the conclusive form, bigrade verbs take the infinitive in earlier texts, r-irregular verbs took the attributive form, and some auxiliary verbs inflecting like adjective and negative auxiliary verbs「ず」also took the attributive.
- Infinitive + 「つつ」 (tutu): 'while (at the same time)'.
- Infinitive of verb / stem of adjective + 「ながら」(nagara): 'while, while still' or 'despite'.

==== Binding particle ====
There were some special particles that limited the inflectional form of the yougen and auxiliary verb at the end of a sentence. These particles are called binding particles(係(かかり)助(じょ)詞(し)). These limitations are called binding rules(係(かか)り結(むす)びの法(ほう)則(そく)).

Binding particle	Meaning	Ending form	Example
ぞ	emphasis on its phrase	attributive	ふるさとは花ぞ昔(むかし)の香(かおり)に匂(にほ)ひける (Kokin Wakashū, 42th) In (my) hometown, the flowers (still) smell exactly like the scent of the past! attributive of「けり」(Auxiliary verb of emotive assertion)
なむ	emphasis on its phrase	attributive	その竹の中に、もと光る竹(たけ)なむ一(ひと)筋(すぢ)ありける (The Tale of the Bamboo Cutter) Among these bamboos, there was one bamboo that was shining at root. (However, note that there's no relative pronoun in Japanese even in old times) attributive of「けり」(Auxiliary verb of the past)
や(やは)	question, or rhetorical question	attributive	春(はる)やとき花やおそきと聞きわかむ (Kokin Wakashū, 10th) I listen (to the singing of the nightingale) and try to realize. Is spring too early or the flower (blooming) too late? attributive of adjectives「疾(と)し」("early, fast") and「遲(おそ)し」 ("late, slow")
か(かは)	question, or rhetorical question	attributive	生きとし生けるもの いづれか歌を詠(よ)まざりける (Kokin Wakashū, Kana preface) (Among all) living beings, who doesn't write a poem!(or ?) attributive of「けり」
こそ	strong emphasis on its phrase	realis	男はこの女をこそ得(え)めと思ふ (The Tales of Ise) (However) the man thought he must get (married with) that girl. realis of modal auxiliary verb「む」

Note that the case particle「と」indicates a preceding quote, and a quote should be considered as an independent sentence when applying the binding rule.

Susumu Ōno assumed that these binding particles were originally final particles. For example:

Man'yōgana: 苦毛 零來雨可 (from Man'yōshū, 265th)

Modern transliteration: 苦(くる)しくも 降(ふ)り来(く)る雨(あめ)か

Translation: How miserable! Why it starts to rain!

Notice that 「来る」 is attributive(the modification to the noun 「雨」). According to his assumption, if we want to emphasize the noun 「雨」, we can invert the whole sentence as the following:

雨か降り来る

Obviously, this gives birth to the binding rule. Since other binding particles can also be considered as final particles in Old Japanese, this assumption is reasonable.

=== Verbs ===
Early Middle Japanese verb inflection was agglutinative. Most verbs were conjugated in 6 forms and could be combined with auxiliary verbs to express tense, aspect, mood, voice, and polarity. Several of the auxiliary verbs could be combined in a string, and each component determined the choice of form of the preceding component.

In Japanese there are many different yougens with the same pronunciation, or the same yougen has various meanings. To distinguish, modern transliteration uses Kanji to highlight these differences. For example, the lower bigrade verbs「慣(な)る」means "get used to", but its also means "become familiar" which is represented by「馴(な)る」. Meanwhile, the quadrigrade verb「成(な)る」has the same pronunciation with 「慣(な)る」but it actually means "become".

==== Conjugation ====
Early Middle Japanese inherited all eight verbal conjugations class from Old Japanese and added new one: Lower Monograde, but there's only 「蹴(け)る」("kick by foot") classified as Lower Monograde in Early Middle Japanese.

Early Middle Japanese Verbs were divided into 5 class of regular conjugations:

Quadrigrade (四段, yodan), Upper monograde (上一段, kami ichidan), Lower monograde (下一段, shimo ichidan), Upper bigrade (上二段, kami nidan), Lower bigrade (下二段, shimo nidan).

There were also 4 "irregular" (変格) conjugations:

K-irregular (カ変, kahen), S-irregular (サ変, sahen), N-irregular (ナ変, nahen), R-irregular (ラ変, rahen).

The conjugation of each is divided into 6 Inflectional forms(活(かつ)用(よう)形(けい)):

- Irrealis (未然形, mizenkei, "imperfect form")
- Infinitive (連用形, ren'yōkei, "form linking to Yougen")
- Conclusive (終止形, shūshikei, "form to end [a sentence]")
- Attributive (連体形, rentaikei, "form linking to Taigen")
- Realis (已然形, izenkei, "perfect form")
- Imperative (命令形, meireikei,"form to give order")

The English names for the irrealis and the realis differ from author to author, including negative and evidential, or imperfective and perfective.

In following table, red part means stem, while blue part means Inflectional suffix.

- Inflectional form = (stem) + Inflectional suffix (活(かつ)用(よう)形(けい) = 語(ご)幹(かん) + 活用語(ご)尾(び))
- Inflectional suffix = root consonant + real suffix (root consonant is unique to every verb.)

Inflectional class 活用の種類	stem 語幹	Inflectional form 活用形						Translation
Inflectional class 活用の種類	stem 語幹	Irrealis 未然形	Infinitive 連用形	Conclusive 終止形	Attributive 連体形	Realis 已然形	Imperative 命令形	Translation
Quadrigrade 四段	聞(き)	きか (-a)	きき (-i)	きく (-u)		きけ (-e)		'hear'
Upper Monograde 上一段	-	み (-i)		見(み)る (-iru)		みれ (-ire)	みよ (-i[yo])	'see'
Upper Monograde 上一段	用(もち)	もちゐ		もちゐる		もちゐれ	もちゐよ	'use'
Lower Monograde 下一段	-	け (-e)		蹴(け)る (-eru)		けれ (-ere)	けよ (-e[yo])	'kick'
Upper Bigrade 上二段	過(す)	すぎ (-i)		すぐ (-u)	すぐる (-uru)	すぐれ (-ure)	すぎよ (-iyo)	'pass'
Lower Bigrade 下二段	受(う)	うけ (-e)		うく (-u)	うくる (-uru)	うくれ (-ure)	うけよ (-e[yo])	'receive'
K-irregular カ変	-	こ (-o)	き (-i)	来(く) (-u)	くる (-uru)	くれ (-ure)	こ (-o)	'come'
S-irregular サ変	-	せ (-e)	し (-i)	爲(す) (-u)	する (-uru)	すれ (-ure)	せよ (-e[yo])	'do'
S-irregular サ変	期(き)	きせ	きし	きす	きする	きすれ	きせよ	'set the date' *
N-irregular ナ変	死(し)	しな (-a)	しに (-i)	しぬ (-u)	しぬる (-uru)	しぬれ (-ure)	しね (-e)	'die'
R-irregular ラ変	有(あ)	あら (-a)	あり (-i)		ある (-u)	あれ (-e)		'be, exist'

*Noted that most S-irregular is the combination of a noun and 「爲(す)」, for example, 「期(き)す」 is a combination of the noun 「期(き)」 ('date') and 「爲(す)」.

The 「よ」 at the end of the imperative forms is optional, although exceedingly common.

The system of 9 conjugation classes appears to be complex. However, all nine conjugations can be subsumed into variations of two groups:

- the consonant-root verbs (quadrigrade, N-irregular and R-irregular verbs)
- the vowel-root verbs (others)

The irregularity of N-irregular verbs occurred only in the conclusive and the attributive, and as there are no quadrigrade verbs with n-roots, quadrigrade and N-irregular verb patterns may be treated as being in complementary distribution. Vowel-root verbs consist of bigrade verbs (the majority), a few monograde verbs (especially 見(み)る 'see' and 居(ゐ)る 'sit'), the K-irregular verb 来(く) 'come', and the S-irregular verb se- 'do' (or -ze- in some compounds). The difference between 'upper' and 'lower' bigrade or monograde verbs is whether the vowel at the end of the root was i or e. The difference between bigrade and monograde was whether in the conclusive, attributive, and realis, the initial u of the ending elided the vowel of the root or the vowel of the roots elides the initial u of the ending.

There are some questions about this arrangement of forms:

- The irrealis is not used as an independent verb form: it must be followed by an auxiliary.
  That said, there is a limited set of nouns appearing in Old Japanese and ending in -a, that appear to overlap phonetically and semantically with the irrealis form of certain verbs. These could be analyzed as resultative deverbal nouns.
- The classical passive auxiliary verb 「る」 (「ゆ」in Old Japanese) attaches to the irrealis stem with an -a ending (i.e. quadrigrade, N-irregular and R-irregular), while the other classical passive auxiliary 「らる」 (「らゆ」in Old Japanese) attaches to the irrealis stem without an -a ending (i.e. for the bigrade verbs, whose stems end in either -e or -i). This raises the assumption that this -a ending appears to be part of the auxiliary verb, but not part of the verb conjugation stem. (The causative auxiliary verbs 「す」 and 「さす」have same distribution and vowel arrangement.) According to this assumption, some scholars like Nicolas Tranter argue that the irrealis does not exist, per se, interpreting this instead as a more primitive "stem" plus an -a element that is the start of a following word. However, this rejection of the irrealis cannot explain the attested forms seen where the irrealis stem ending in -a is followed by the conditional particle 「ば」("if"), expressing an unreal condition (i.e. subjunctive mood) in classical Japanese. In actuality, the Japanese term 「未然形」 (mizenkei), while often translated as "irrealis", literally means "imperfect form", and it is named after this kind of usage. Additionally, the rejection cannot explain the modal auxiliary verb 「む」("seems as if, looks like, as though it should/could..."), which also attaches to the irrealis. Various examples:

Quadrigrade verb: 物(もの)に襲(おそ)はるる心(ここ)地(ち)して (The Tale of Genji)
Quadrigrade verb: 名(な)にし負(お)はばいざ言(こと)問(と)はむ (Kokin Wakashū, 411th)
Lower Bigrade: 舅(しうと)に譽(ほ)めらるる婿(むこ) (The Pillow Book)
K-irregular: 月(つき)の都(みやこ)の人(ひと)まうで来(こ)ば捕(と)らへさせむ (The Tale of the Bamboo Cutter)
Note that auxiliary verbs have their own inflections. For example, 「るる」 is the attributive of passive / spontaneous / potential auxiliary 「る」, while「らるる」 is the attributive of synonymous 「らる」 (the form attaching to bigrade verbs, whose stems end in vowels -e or -i). Additionally, both of these auxiliaries inflect according to the lower bigrade conjugation paradigm.

- The infinitive had two functions: a linking function with another yougen or auxiliary verb, and a nominal function as a deverbal noun, but these two functions have different pitch patterns.
- Generally, The yougen or auxiliary verb occurred before conjunction particle 「とも」 ("even if") in the conclusive form, but in some instances in Old Japanese poetry, the upper monograde verb 「見(み)る」 appears in the infinitive form instead before「とも」:

Man'yōgana: 之婆之婆美等母 安加無伎禰加毛 (Man'yōshū, 4503th)

Modern transliteration: しばしば見(み)とも、飽(あ)かむ君(きみ)かも

It is possible that the monograde verb infinitive form mi above that was used before 「とも」 was the earlier true conclusive form. Alternatively, the form above may have been an instance of poetic contraction to limit the number of morae on the line to the expected seven.

- Additionally, before auxiliary verb 「べし」(beshi, "should/could"), any yougen should generally use the conclusive, while R-irregular verbs use the attributive instead (「あり」 ari, 'be' at the end of a sentence but 「あるべし」 aru beshi, 'should be'). With endings such as 「べし」 (beshi), there is strong evidence that this word was originally the adverb 「宜(うべ)し」 (ubeshi, "certainly"), and thus the observed combination of aru beshi is probably a fusion of the root ar- of the verb with the initial u sound of the auxiliary — suggesting that, in 「あるべし」 (aru beshi), when we would expect ari beshi, the apparently anomalous u was actually part of the following word, and not part of the verb form.

=== Auxiliary verbs ===
Auxiliary verbs are attached to the various forms of yougen, and a yougen could be followed by several such endings in a string. Auxiliary verbs are classified into many inflectional class like verbs.

Generally, to learn how to use an Auxiliary verb, we need to know (1)its inflection, (2)required forms of its preceding word, and (3) various function. The following is a detail example about 「る」and 「らる」.

Inflectional Class 活用の種類	Irrealis 未然形	Infinitive 連用形	Conclusive 終止形	Attributive 連体形	Realis 已然形	Imperative 命令形
Lower Bigrade 下二段	れ (-e)		る (-u)	るる (-uru)	るれ (-ure)	れよ (-u[yo])
Lower Bigrade 下二段	られ (-e)		らる (-u)	らるる (-uru)	らるれ (-ure)	られよ (-u[yo])

「る」 requires to be preceded by irrealis with -a ending (i.e. quadrigrade, N-irregular and R-irregular), while 「らる」requires irrealis without -a ending(i.e. other classes).

They have 4 different functions.

1. Representing passive mood:
  人(ひと)にあなづらるるもの (The Pillow Book)
  translation: thing that is despised by people
2. Representing slight respect to someone (by means of passive mood):
  母の悲(かな)しがらるること (Tosa Nikki)
  translation: the thing that make the mother (author's wife) sad (i.e. representing slight respect to his own wife)
3. Expressing possibility or potential.
  弓(ゆみ)矢(や)して射(い)られじ (The Tale of the Bamboo Cutter)
  translation: It doesn't seem bow and arrow can shoot (it down). (Noted that 「じ」is a modal auxiliary verb that requires to be preceded by irrealis)
4. Representing a spontaneous voice(i.e. without volitional control).
  風(かぜ)の音(おと)にぞ驚(おどろ)かれぬる (Kokin Wakashū, 169th)
  translation: the sound of wind (exactly) has made me startled.
  (Noted that「ぬる」is attributive of perfect auxiliary verb「ぬ」. Since it's "bound" by binding particle「ぞ」, it has to occur as attributive.)

==== Rough classification ====
Voice: 'passive' and 'causative':

- Consonant-stem verbs + 「る」, vowel-stem verbs + 「らる」 (lower bigrade): passive voice; spontaneous voice (expressing lack of volitional control); honorific; potential ('can').
- Consonant-stem verbs + 「す」, vowel-stem verbs + 「さす」 (lower bigrade): causative; honorific.
- Any verb + 「しむ」 (lower bigrade): causative; honorific. It often occurs in Kanbun.

Tense/Aspect:

- Irrealis +「り」 (R-irregular): progressive or perfect aspect. Only attached to quadrigrade or S-irregular verbs.
- Infinitive + 「たり」 (R-irregular): progressive or perfect aspect. Attached to any verbs.
- Infinitive + 「ぬ」 (N-irregular): perfective aspect.
- Infinitive + 「つ」 (lower bigrade): perfective aspect.
- Infinitive + 「き」(unique conjugation): witnessed past tense.
- Infinitive + 「けり」 (R-irregular): unwitnessed past tense, or emotive assertion.
- Irrealis + 「まし」 (unique conjugation): counterfactual ('would have ... ed'). The combination 「ましかば」(Irrealis + ば) expresses a counterfactual condition ('if ... had ... ed').

Mood:

- 「む」 (quadrigrade): tentative mood, expressing among other functions uncertainty ('maybe', 'shall I?'), intention ('I shall'), and hortative ('let's').
- 「べし」 (siku-adjective): debitive mood, expressing 'can', 'should', or 'must'.
- 「なり」 (R-irregular): hearsay mood.

Polarity:

- 「ず」(unique conjugation): negative.
- 「じ」 (uninflected): negative of the tentative mood (not seem...).
- 「まじ」(siku-adjective): negative of the dubitative mood.

=== Adjectives ===
There were two types of adjectives: regular adjectives and adjectival nouns.

The regular adjective was subdivided into two types: those for which the adverbial form ended in 「-く」(-ku) and those that ended in 「-しく」(-siku).

Class of inflection	subclass	stem 語幹	Irrealis 未然形	Adverbial 連用形	Conclusive 終止形	Attributive 連体形	Realis 已然形	Imperative 命令形	meaning
-ku ク活用	(main) 本活用	高(たか)	(たかく / たかけ)	たかく (-ku)	たかし (-si)	たかき (-ki)	たかけれ (-kere)		'be high'
-ku ク活用	(-kari) カリ活用	高(たか)	たかから (-kara)	たかかり (-kari)	たかかり (-kari)	たかかる (-karu)	たかかれ (-kare)	たかかれ (-kare)	'be high'
-siku シク活用	(main) 本活用	美(うつく)	(うつくしく / うつくしけ)	うつくしく (-siku)	うつくし (-si)	うつくしき (-siki)	うつくしけれ (-sikere)		'be beautiful'
-siku シク活用	(-kari) カリ活用	美(うつく)	うつくしから (-sikara)	うつくしかり (-sikari)	うつくしかり (-sikari)	うつくしかる (-sikaru)	うつくしかれ (-sikare)	うつくしかれ (-sikare)	'be beautiful'

The class of siku-adjectives included a few adjectives that had 「-じ」(-z), rather than 「-し」:

Class of inflection	subclass	stem 語幹	Irrealis 未然形	Adverbial 連用形	Conclusive 終止形	Attributive 連体形	Realis 已然形	Imperative 命令形	meaning
-siku シク活用	main 本活用	同(おな)	(-じく)	-じく	-じ	-じき	-じけれ		'be the same'
-siku シク活用	kari カリ活用	同(おな)	-じから	-じかり	-じかり	-じかる	-じかれ	-じかれ	'be the same'

They usually had 「-じ」 rather than 「-じき」 in its attributive form.

The -kar- and -sikar- forms (カリ活用) were derived from the verb 「有(あ)り」"be, exists.":

Man'yōgana: 可奈之久安里家牟 (Man'yōshū, 4333th)

Modern transliteration:悲(かな)しくありけむ

Since the auxiliary verb of pass tentative mood「けむ」needs to be preceded by infinitive, 「あり」is in infinitive form. And then naturally, the adjective 「悲(かな)し」links to 「あり」 by infinitive (連用形). In Man'yōshū there's also example of 「-かり」.

Man'yōgana: 加奈之可利家理 (Man'yōshū, 793th)

Modern transliteration:悲(かな)しかりけり

Since the auxiliary verb of unwitnessed past「けり」needs to be preceded by infinitive, 「悲(かな)し」is in infinitive form.

So it's reasonable to assume that the infinitive suffix「-かり」is derived from 「-くあり」that had lost its initial u-sound(i.e. sound change of infinitive suffix + 「あり」). There's also similar example about other forms in Man'yōshū.

From above paragraph, we can realize that kari inflection is generally used to link to an auxiliary verbs(so it's also called 「補(ほ)助(じょ)活(かつ)用(よう)」, "complement and auxiliary inflection"), but there's an example to show that the imperative form of kari inflection is an exception of this rule:

はげしかれとは (Senzai Wakashū, 708th)

That is, the imperative form of kari inflection is independently used without linking to any auxiliary verb.(However, it actually expresses a wish but not an order.)

=== Adjectival noun ===
Class of inflection	stem 語幹	Irrealis 未然形	Adverbial 連用形	Conclusive 終止形	Attributive 連体形	Realis 已然形	Imperative 命令形	meaning
Nari ナリ活用	静(しづ)か	しづかなら(-nara)	しづかなり(-nari)	しづかなり(-nari)	しづかなる(-naru)	しづかなれ(-nare)		'be static'
Nari ナリ活用	静(しづ)か	しづかなら(-nara)	しづかに(-ni)	しづかなり(-nari)	しづかなる(-naru)	しづかなれ(-nare)		'be static'
Tari タリ活用	悄(せう)然(ぜん)*	悄然たら(-tara)	悄然たり(-tari)	悄然たり(-tari)	悄然たる(-taru)	悄然たれ(-tare)		''be quiet, soft"
Tari タリ活用	悄(せう)然(ぜん)*	悄然たら(-tara)	悄然と(-to)	悄然たり(-tari)	悄然たる(-taru)	悄然たれ(-tare)		''be quiet, soft"

*The Japanese term 悄然 (seuzen, modern shōzen) is a borrowing from Middle Chinese word 悄然 with reconstructed pronunciation /tsʰjɑu nʑǐɛn/, meaning ‘quietly, softly’. Like 悄然 (seuzen), most tari adjectives are derived from Chinese borrowings.

The nari and tari inflections shared a similar etymology. The nari form was a contraction of the adverbial particle「に」and the -r irregular verb「有(あ)り」"be, exist": に + あり → なり, while the tari inflection was a contraction of the adverbial particle と and 有(あ)り: と + あり → たり.

=== Yougen in auxiliary form ===
- 「居(を)り」 (R-irregular): progressive aspect. 'sit; live; be'.
- 「居(ゐ)る」 (Upper monograde): progressive aspect. 'continue, ...ing'.
- 「置(お)く」 (Quadrigrade): preparative aspect, expressing an action performed in readiness for some future action. 'put'.
- 「見(み)る」(Upper monograde): speculative aspect, expressing an action performed experimentally, to 'see' what it is like. 'see'.

== See also ==
- Bungo
- Heian literature

== Sources ==
- Katsuki-Pestemer, Noriko (2009). A Grammar of Classical Japanese. München: LINCOM. ISBN 978-3-929075-68-7.
- Frellesvig, Bjarke (1995). A Case Study in Diachronic Phonology: The Japanese Onbin Sound Changes. Aarhus University Press. ISBN 87-7288-489-4.
- Frellesvig, Bjarke (2010). A history of the Japanese language. Cambridge: Cambridge University Press. ISBN 978-0-521-65320-6.
- Kondō, Yasuhiro; Masayuki Tsukimoto; Katsumi Sugiura (2005). Nihongo no Rekishi. Hōsō Daigaku Kyōiku Shinkōkai. ISBN 4-595-30547-8.
- Labrune, Laurence (2012). The Phonology of Japanese. Oxford University Press. doi:10.1093/acprof:oso/9780199545834.003.0003.
- Martin, Samuel E. (1987). The Japanese Language Through Time. Yale University. ISBN 0-300-03729-5.
- Miyake, Marc Hideo (2003). Old Japanese : a phonetic reconstruction. London; New York: RoutledgeCurzon. ISBN 0-415-30575-6.
- Nakata, Norio (1972). Kōza Kokugoshi: Dai 2 kan: On'inshi, Mojishi (in Japanese). Taishūkan Shoten.
- Ōno, Susumu (2000). Nihongo no Keisei. Iwanami Shoten. ISBN 4-00-001758-6.
- Shibatani, Masayoshi (1990). The languages of Japan. Cambridge University Press. ISBN 0-521-36918-5.
- Vovin, Alexander (2002). A Reference Grammar of Classical Japanese Prose. New York: Routledge. ISBN 0-7007-1716-1.
- Yamaguchi, Akiho; Hideo Suzuki; Ryūzō Sakanashi; Masayuki Tsukimoto (1997). Nihongo no Rekishi. Tōkyō Daigaku Shuppankai. ISBN 4-13-082004-4.
- Yoshida, Kanehiko; Hiroshi Tsukishima; Harumichi Ishizuka; Masayuki Tsukimoto (2001). Kuntengo Jiten (in Japanese). Tōkyō: Tōkyōdō Shuppan. ISBN 4-490-10570-3.
