= Yi (kana) =

yi

Hiragana	Katakana
- Transliteration: i, yi
- Hiragana origin: 以
- Katakana origin: 以
- Man'yōgana: 以

Yi (hiragana: 𛀆, katakana: 𛄠) is a Japanese mora or a kana used to write it, though it has never been in standard use.

== History ==
It is presumed that yi would have represented [ji]. Along with 𛀁 (ye) and 𛄟 (wu), the mora yi has no officially recognized kana, as these morae do not occur in native Japanese words; however, during the Meiji period, linguists almost unanimously agreed on the kana for yi, ye, and wu. 𛀆 (yi) and 𛄟 (wu) are thought to have never occurred as morae in Japanese, and 𛀁 (ye) was merged with え (e) as a result of regular historical sound changes.

== Characters ==
In the Edo period and the Meiji period, some Japanese linguists tried to separate kana i and kana yi. The shapes of characters differed with each linguist. 𛀆 and 𛄠 were just two of many glyphs.

They were phonetic symbols to fill in the blanks of the gojūon table, but Japanese people did not separate them in normal writing.

- i
  - Traditional kana
    - い (Hiragana)
    - イ (Katakana)
- yi
  - Traditional kana
    - い (Hiragana)
    - 𛀆 (A variant form of い. Hiragana.)
    - イ (Katakana)
  - Constructed kana
    - い゙(い with dots. Hiragana.)
    - 𛀆゙(𛀆 with dots. Hiragana.)
    - イ゙(イ with dots. Katakana.)
    - 𛄠(A part of 以. Katakana.)

These suggestions were not accepted.

== Unicode ==
The hiragana form of this kana is encoded into Unicode as HENTAIGANA LETTER I-1, with the position of U+1B006, while the katakana is encoded as KATAKANA LETTER ARCHAIC YI, in the position U+1B120.

== See also ==
- Ye (kana)
- Wu (kana)
