= Kana Extended-B =

- Range: U+1AFF0..U+1AFFF (16 code points)
- Plane: SMP
- Scripts: Katakana
- Assigned: 13 code points
- Unused: 3 reserved code points

Unicode version history
- 14.0 (2021): 13 (+13)

Unicode documentation
- Code chart ∣ Web page

Kana Extended-B is a Unicode block containing Taiwanese kana (that is, kana originally created by Japanese linguists to write Taiwanese Hokkien).

== Block ==
Kana Extended-B^{[1]}^{[2]} Official Unicode Consortium code chart (PDF)
	0	1	2	3	4	5	6	7	8	9	A	B	C	D	E	F
U+1AFFx	𚿰	𚿱	𚿲	𚿳		𚿵	𚿶	𚿷	𚿸	𚿹	𚿺	𚿻		𚿽	𚿾	
Notes: 1. As of Unicode version 17.0; 2. Grey areas indicate non-assigned code points

== History ==
The following Unicode-related documents record the purpose and process of defining specific characters in the Kana Extended-A block:

Version	Final code points (Note: Proposed code points and characters names may differ from final code points and names)	Count	L2 ID	Document
14.0	U+1AFF0..1AFF3, 1AFF5..1AFFB, 1AFFD..1AFFE	13	L2/20-209	Brennan, Fredrick R. (2020-08-18), A Proposal to Encode Taiwanese Kana in the UCS
14.0	U+1AFF0..1AFF3, 1AFF5..1AFFB, 1AFFD..1AFFE	13	L2/20-233	Chan, Eiso (2020-09-18), Feedback on L2/20-209 and some information for the shakuhachi musical notation
14.0	U+1AFF0..1AFF3, 1AFF5..1AFFB, 1AFFD..1AFFE	13	L2/20-209R	Brennan, Fredrick R. (2020-12-13), Final Proposal to Encode Taiwanese Kana in the UCS
14.0	U+1AFF0..1AFF3, 1AFF5..1AFFB, 1AFFD..1AFFE	13	L2/21-016R	Anderson, Deborah; Whistler, Ken; Pournader, Roozbeh; Moore, Lisa; Liang, Hai (2021-01-14), "22 Kana", Recommendations to UTC #166 January 2021 on Script Proposals
14.0	U+1AFF0..1AFF3, 1AFF5..1AFFB, 1AFFD..1AFFE	13	L2/21-009	Moore, Lisa (2021-01-27), "B.1 — 22 Kana", UTC #166 Minutes

== Fonts ==
As of 28 March 2024, 2 fonts are known to support the Kana Extended-B range:

- Nishiki-teki.
- FRBTaiwaneseKana.

== See also ==
- Kana Supplement (Unicode block)
- Small Kana Extension (Unicode block)
- Hiragana (Unicode block)
- Katakana (Unicode block)
- Kana Extended-A (Unicode block)
