= Kana Supplement =

- Range: U+1B000..U+1B0FF (256 code points)
- Plane: SMP
- Scripts: Hiragana (255 char.); Katakana (1 char.)
- Major alphabets: Japanese
- Assigned: 256 code points
- Unused: 0 reserved code points

Unicode version history
- 6.0 (2010): 2 (+2)
- 10.0 (2017): 256 (+254)

Unicode documentation
- Code chart ∣ Web page

Kana Supplement is a Unicode block containing one archaic katakana character and 255 hentaigana (non-standard Hiragana) characters. Additional hentaigana characters are encoded in the Kana Extended-A block.

== Block ==
Kana Supplement^{[1]} Official Unicode Consortium code chart (PDF)
	0	1	2	3	4	5	6	7	8	9	A	B	C	D	E	F
U+1B00x	𛀀	𛀁	𛀂	𛀃	𛀄	𛀅	𛀆	𛀇	𛀈	𛀉	𛀊	𛀋	𛀌	𛀍	𛀎	𛀏
U+1B01x	𛀐	𛀑	𛀒	𛀓	𛀔	𛀕	𛀖	𛀗	𛀘	𛀙	𛀚	𛀛	𛀜	𛀝	𛀞	𛀟
U+1B02x	𛀠	𛀡	𛀢	𛀣	𛀤	𛀥	𛀦	𛀧	𛀨	𛀩	𛀪	𛀫	𛀬	𛀭	𛀮	𛀯
U+1B03x	𛀰	𛀱	𛀲	𛀳	𛀴	𛀵	𛀶	𛀷	𛀸	𛀹	𛀺	𛀻	𛀼	𛀽	𛀾	𛀿
U+1B04x	𛁀	𛁁	𛁂	𛁃	𛁄	𛁅	𛁆	𛁇	𛁈	𛁉	𛁊	𛁋	𛁌	𛁍	𛁎	𛁏
U+1B05x	𛁐	𛁑	𛁒	𛁓	𛁔	𛁕	𛁖	𛁗	𛁘	𛁙	𛁚	𛁛	𛁜	𛁝	𛁞	𛁟
U+1B06x	𛁠	𛁡	𛁢	𛁣	𛁤	𛁥	𛁦	𛁧	𛁨	𛁩	𛁪	𛁫	𛁬	𛁭	𛁮	𛁯
U+1B07x	𛁰	𛁱	𛁲	𛁳	𛁴	𛁵	𛁶	𛁷	𛁸	𛁹	𛁺	𛁻	𛁼	𛁽	𛁾	𛁿
U+1B08x	𛂀	𛂁	𛂂	𛂃	𛂄	𛂅	𛂆	𛂇	𛂈	𛂉	𛂊	𛂋	𛂌	𛂍	𛂎	𛂏
U+1B09x	𛂐	𛂑	𛂒	𛂓	𛂔	𛂕	𛂖	𛂗	𛂘	𛂙	𛂚	𛂛	𛂜	𛂝	𛂞	𛂟
U+1B0Ax	𛂠	𛂡	𛂢	𛂣	𛂤	𛂥	𛂦	𛂧	𛂨	𛂩	𛂪	𛂫	𛂬	𛂭	𛂮	𛂯
U+1B0Bx	𛂰	𛂱	𛂲	𛂳	𛂴	𛂵	𛂶	𛂷	𛂸	𛂹	𛂺	𛂻	𛂼	𛂽	𛂾	𛂿
U+1B0Cx	𛃀	𛃁	𛃂	𛃃	𛃄	𛃅	𛃆	𛃇	𛃈	𛃉	𛃊	𛃋	𛃌	𛃍	𛃎	𛃏
U+1B0Dx	𛃐	𛃑	𛃒	𛃓	𛃔	𛃕	𛃖	𛃗	𛃘	𛃙	𛃚	𛃛	𛃜	𛃝	𛃞	𛃟
U+1B0Ex	𛃠	𛃡	𛃢	𛃣	𛃤	𛃥	𛃦	𛃧	𛃨	𛃩	𛃪	𛃫	𛃬	𛃭	𛃮	𛃯
U+1B0Fx	𛃰	𛃱	𛃲	𛃳	𛃴	𛃵	𛃶	𛃷	𛃸	𛃹	𛃺	𛃻	𛃼	𛃽	𛃾	𛃿
Notes: 1. As of Unicode version 17.0

== History ==
The following Unicode-related documents record the purpose and process of defining specific characters in the Kana Supplement block:

Version	Final code points (Note: Proposed code points and characters names may differ from final code points and names)	Count	L2 ID	WG2 ID	Document
6.0	U+1B000..1B001	2	L2/07-421	N3388	Kato, Nozomu (2008-01-14), Proposal to encode two Kana characters concerning YE
6.0	U+1B000..1B001	2	L2/08-117	N3394	UTC/L2 request to review proposal for encoding 2 kana characters, 2008-02-28
6.0	U+1B000..1B001	2	L2/08-257		Kato, Nozomu (2008-07-14), Letter from Nozomu Kato to UTC, re Kana [restricted access]
6.0	U+1B000..1B001	2	L2/08-358	N3528	Japan's Input to N3388 (Two Kana Characters), 2008-10-09
6.0	U+1B000..1B001	2	L2/08-359		Kato, Nozomu (2008-10-24), About WG2 N3528
6.0	U+1B000..1B001	2	L2/08-412	N3553 (pdf, doc)	Umamaheswaran, V. S. (2008-11-05), "M53.24e", Unconfirmed minutes of WG 2 meeting 53
6.0	U+1B000..1B001	2	L2/09-062		Kato, Nozomu (2009-01-27), Background Info on "e" Letters in Kana (in Japanese)
6.0	U+1B000..1B001	2	L2/09-003R		Moore, Lisa (2009-02-12), "B.15.18", UTC #118 / L2 #215 Minutes
6.0	U+1B000..1B001	2	L2/09-234	N3603 (pdf, doc)	Umamaheswaran, V. S. (2009-07-08), "M54.06b, M54.06c", Unconfirmed minutes of WG 2 meeting 54
6.0	U+1B000..1B001	2	L2/09-104		Moore, Lisa (2009-05-20), "Consensus 119-C24", UTC #119 / L2 #216 Minutes
6.0	U+1B000..1B001	2	L2/09-335R		Moore, Lisa (2009-11-10), "Consensus 121-C7", UTC #121 / L2 #218 Minutes, "Change block name HISTORIC KANA to KANA SUPPLEMENT."
6.0	U+1B000..1B001	2	L2/16-037		Anderson, Deborah; Whistler, Ken; McGowan, Rick; Pournader, Roozbeh; Glass, Andrew; Iancu, Laurențiu (2016-01-22), "16", Recommendations to UTC #146 January 2016 on Script Proposals
6.0	U+1B000..1B001	2	L2/16-123		"Two comments on hentaigana proposal", Comments on Public Review Issues (Jan 22, 2016 - May 03, 2016), 2016-05-05
6.0	U+1B000..1B001	2	L2/16-189	N4731	Proposal to add a new character name alias to U+1B001, 2016-06-20
6.0	U+1B000..1B001	2	L2/16-216		Anderson, Deborah; Whistler, Ken; McGowan, Rick; Pournader, Roozbeh; Glass, Andrew; Iancu, Laurențiu; Moore, Lisa (2016-07-30), "6.b", Recommendations to UTC #148 August 2016 on Script Proposals
6.0	U+1B000..1B001	2	L2/16-203		Moore, Lisa (2016-08-18), "B.15.2", UTC #148 Minutes
6.0	U+1B000..1B001	2	L2/17-014		Orita, Tetsuji (2017-01-13), Notes on the HENTAIGANA「江」and the ARCHAIC HIRAGANA YE
6.0	U+1B000..1B001	2	L2/17-016		Moore, Lisa (2017-02-08), "C.9.1 Notes on the HENTAIGANA「江」and the ARCHAIC HIRAGANA YE", UTC #150 Minutes
10.0	U+1B002..1B0FF	254	L2/09-099	N3698	van der Werven, Jeroen Ruigrok (2009-02-15), A proposal for encoding the hentaigana characters
10.0	U+1B002..1B0FF	254	L2/09-200		McGowan, Rick (2009-05-07), Page images from Yomikata Nyuumon, 1884
10.0	U+1B002..1B0FF	254	L2/09-201		McGowan, Rick (2009-05-07), Type sample page image, hentaigana, 1903
10.0	U+1B002..1B0FF	254	L2/11-229	N4091 (pdf, doc)	Notes on hentaigana, 2011-06-01
10.0	U+1B002..1B0FF	254		N4103	"11.1.2 Hentaigana characters", Unconfirmed minutes of WG 2 meeting 58, 2012-01-03
10.0	U+1B002..1B0FF	254	L2/15-193	N4670	Orita, Tetsuji (2015-07-23), Request for Comments on HENTAIGANA proposal
10.0	U+1B002..1B0FF	254	L2/15-239	N4674	Proposal of Japanese HENTAIGANA, 2015-09-18
10.0	U+1B002..1B0FF	254	L2/15-300		Tashiro, Shuichi (2015-10-31), Hentaigana List after Matsue discussion
10.0	U+1B002..1B0FF	254	L2/15-312		Anderson, Deborah; Whistler, Ken; McGowan, Rick; Pournader, Roozbeh; Glass, Andrew; Iancu, Laurențiu (2015-11-01), "8. Hentaigana", Recommendations to UTC #145 November 2015 on Script Proposals
10.0	U+1B002..1B0FF	254	L2/15-316		Takada, Tomokazu; Yada, Tsutomu; Saito, Tatsuya (2015-11-03), The past, present, and future of hentaigana [in Japanese]
10.0	U+1B002..1B0FF	254	L2/15-318 (pdf, xlsx)		Yada, Tsutomu (2015-11-04), About the inclusion of standardized codepoints for Hentaigana
10.0	U+1B002..1B0FF	254	L2/15-334		Tranter, Nicolas (2015-12-09), Hentaigana proposal
10.0	U+1B002..1B0FF	254	L2/15-343 (pdf, xlsx)	N4708	Orita, Tetsuji (2015-12-09), Revised Proposal of HENTAIGANA
10.0	U+1B002..1B0FF	254	L2/16-053		Lunde, Ken (2015-12-16), Hentaigana Comment Document
10.0	U+1B002..1B0FF	254	L2/16-037		Anderson, Deborah; Whistler, Ken; McGowan, Rick; Pournader, Roozbeh; Glass, Andrew; Iancu, Laurențiu (2016-01-22), "16", Recommendations to UTC #146 January 2016 on Script Proposals
10.0	U+1B002..1B0FF	254	L2/16-040		Lunde, Ken (2016-01-26), Hentaigana Unification Candidates
10.0	U+1B002..1B0FF	254	L2/16-085		Lunde, Ken (2016-04-28), Status of hentaigana proposal
10.0	U+1B002..1B0FF	254	L2/16-123		"Two comments on hentaigana proposal", Comments on Public Review Issues (Jan 22, 2016 - May 03, 2016), 2016-05-05
10.0	U+1B002..1B0FF	254	L2/16-121		Moore, Lisa (2016-05-20), "C.3", UTC #147 Minutes
10.0	U+1B002..1B0FF	254	L2/16-188 (pdf, xlsx)	N4732	Revised Proposal of Hentaigana, 2016-06-20
10.0	U+1B002..1B0FF	254	L2/16-216		Anderson, Deborah; Whistler, Ken; McGowan, Rick; Pournader, Roozbeh; Glass, Andrew; Iancu, Laurențiu; Moore, Lisa (2016-07-30), "6.a", Recommendations to UTC #148 August 2016 on Script Proposals
10.0	U+1B002..1B0FF	254	L2/16-203		Moore, Lisa (2016-08-18), "C.3.1", UTC #148 Minutes
10.0	U+1B002..1B0FF	254		N4743	Proposal to correct the note for "HENTAIGANA LETTER HO-8", 2016-09-12
10.0	U+1B002..1B0FF	254		N4873R (pdf, doc)	"10.3.2", Unconfirmed minutes of WG 2 meeting 65, 2018-03-16
10.0	U+1B002..1B0FF	254	L2/16-325		Moore, Lisa (2016-11-18), "B.1.1.4, B.13.3.1", UTC #149 Minutes

== Fonts ==
As of 26 May 2024, 5 fonts are known to support the 10.0 Kana Supplement range:

- BabelStone Han.
- HanaMinA.
- IPA MJ Mincho.
- Noto Serif Hentaigana
- Sukima Gothic.

== See also ==
- Hiragana (Unicode block)
- Katakana (Unicode block)
- Kana Extended-A (Unicode block)
- Kana Extended-B (Unicode block)
- Small Kana Extension (Unicode block)
