= Katakana Phonetic Extensions =

- Range: U+31F0..U+31FF (16 code points)
- Plane: BMP
- Scripts: Katakana
- Major alphabets: Ainu
- Assigned: 16 code points
- Unused: 0 reserved code points

Unicode version history
- 3.2 (2002): 16 (+16)

Unicode documentation
- Code chart ∣ Web page

Katakana Phonetic Extensions is a Unicode block containing additional small katakana characters for writing the Ainu language, in addition to characters in the Katakana block.

Further small katakana are present in the Small Kana Extension block.

Katakana Phonetic Extensions^{[1]} Official Unicode Consortium code chart (PDF)
	0	1	2	3	4	5	6	7	8	9	A	B	C	D	E	F
U+31Fx	ㇰ	ㇱ	ㇲ	ㇳ	ㇴ	ㇵ	ㇶ	ㇷ	ㇸ	ㇹ	ㇺ	ㇻ	ㇼ	ㇽ	ㇾ	ㇿ
Notes: 1. As of Unicode version 16.0

== History ==
The following Unicode-related documents record the purpose and process of defining specific characters in the Katakana Phonetic Extensions block:

Version	Final code points (Note: Proposed code points and characters names may differ from final code points and names)	Count	L2 ID	WG2 ID	Document
3.2	U+31F0..31FF	16	L2/99-238		Consolidated document containing 6 Japanese proposals, 1999-07-15
3.2	U+31F0..31FF	16		N2092	Addition of forty eight characters, 1999-09-13
3.2	U+31F0..31FF	16	L2/99-365		Moore, Lisa (1999-11-23), Comments on JCS Proposals
3.2	U+31F0..31FF	16	L2/00-024		Shibano, Kohji (2000-01-31), JCS proposal revised
3.2	U+31F0..31FF	16	L2/99-260R		Moore, Lisa (2000-02-07), "JCS Proposals", Minutes of the UTC/L2 meeting in Mission Viejo, October 26-28, 1999
3.2	U+31F0..31FF	16	L2/00-297	N2257	Sato, T. K. (2000-09-04), JIS X 0213 symbols part-1
3.2	U+31F0..31FF	16	L2/00-342	N2278	Sato, T. K.; Everson, Michael; Whistler, Ken; Freytag, Asmus (2000-09-20), Ad hoc Report on Japan feedback N2257 and N2258
3.2	U+31F0..31FF	16	L2/01-050	N2253	Umamaheswaran, V. S. (2001-01-21), "7.16 JIS X0213 Symbols", Minutes of the SC2/WG2 meeting in Athens, September 2000
3.2	U+31F0..31FF	16	L2/01-114	N2328	Summary of Voting on SC 2 N 3503, ISO/IEC 10646-1: 2000/PDAM 1, 2001-03-09
