= Wu (kana) =

wu

Hiragana	Katakana
- Transliteration: u, wu
- Hiragana origin: 汙,于
- Katakana origin: 汙
- Man'yōgana: 傴 汙 紆 迂 于 宇 卯
- Unicode: U+1B11F, U+1B122

Wu (hiragana: 𛄟, katakana: 𛄢) is a Japanese mora or a kana used to write it, though it has never been in standard use.

== History ==
It is presumed that 𛄟 would have represented /β̞u/. (Note: /β̞/ corresponds to what is typically represented as /w/ in modern Japanese, which is still phonetically a bilabial approximant.) Along with 𛀆 (yi) and 𛀁 (ye), the mora wu has no officially recognized kana, as these morae do not occur in native Japanese words; however, during the Meiji period, linguists almost unanimously agreed on the kana for yi, ye, and wu. 𛀆 and wu are thought to have never occurred as morae in Japanese, and 𛀁 was merged with え and エ.

== Characters ==
In the Edo period and the Meiji period, some Japanese linguists tried to separate kana u and kana wu. The shapes of characters differed with each linguist. 𛄟 and 𛄢 were just two of many shapes.

They were phonetic symbols to fill in the blanks of the gojūon table, but Japanese people did not separate them in normal writing.

- u
  - Traditional kana
    - う (Hiragana)
    - 𛀋 (A variant form of う. Hiragana.)
    - 𛀍 (A variant form of う. Hiragana.)
    - ウ (Katakana)
  - Constructed kana
    - (A part of 傴. Katakana.)
- wu
  - Traditional kana
    - う (Hiragana)
    - 𛀋 (A variant form of う. Hiragana.)
    - ウ (Katakana)
    - 𛄢 (An old variant form of ウ. Katakana.)
  - Constructed kana
    - ゔ(う with dakuten. Hiragana.)
    - 𛄟 (A cursive script style of 汙. Hiragana.)
    - (A cursive script style of 紆. Hiragana.)
    - (A cursive script style of 迂. Hiragana,)
    - (A cursive script style of 卯. Hiragana.)
    - ヴ(ウ with dakuten. Katakana.)

These suggestions were not accepted.

== Unicode ==
This kana has been encoded into Unicode 14.0 since September 14, 2021 as HIRAGANA LETTER ARCHAIC WU (U+1B11F), and KATAKANA LETTER ARCHAIC WU (U+1B122).

== See also ==
- Yi (kana)
- Ye (kana)
