= Kana Extended-A =

- Range: U+1B100..U+1B12F (48 code points)
- Plane: SMP
- Scripts: Hiragana (33 char.); Katakana (8 char.)
- Assigned: 41 code points
- Unused: 7 reserved code points

Unicode Version History
- 10.0 (2017): 31 (+31)
- 14.0 (2021): 35 (+4)
- 18.0 (2026): 41 (+6)

Unicode documentation
- Code chart ∣ Web page

Kana Extended-A is a Unicode block containing hentaigana (non-standard hiragana) and historic kana characters. Additional hentaigana characters are encoded in the Kana Supplement block.

== Block ==
Kana Extended-A^{[1]}^{[2]} Official Unicode Consortium code chart (PDF)
	0	1	2	3	4	5	6	7	8	9	A	B	C	D	E	F
U+1B10x	𛄀	𛄁	𛄂	𛄃	𛄄	𛄅	𛄆	𛄇	𛄈	𛄉	𛄊	𛄋	𛄌	𛄍	𛄎	𛄏
U+1B11x	𛄐	𛄑	𛄒	𛄓	𛄔	𛄕	𛄖	𛄗	𛄘	𛄙	𛄚	𛄛	𛄜	𛄝	𛄞	𛄟
U+1B12x	𛄠	𛄡	𛄢	𛄣	𛄤	𛄥	𛄦	𛄧	𛄨							
Notes 1.As of Unicode version 18.0 2.Grey areas indicate non-assigned code points

== History ==
The following Unicode-related documents record the purpose and process of defining specific characters in the Kana Extended-A block:

Version	Final code points (Note: Proposed code points and characters names may differ from final code points and names)	Count	L2 ID	WG2 ID	Document
10.0	U+1B100..1B11E	31	L2/09-099	N3698	van der Werven, Jeroen Ruigrok (2009-02-15), A proposal for encoding the hentaigana characters
10.0	U+1B100..1B11E	31	L2/09-200		McGowan, Rick (2009-05-07), Page images from Yomikata Nyuumon, 1884
10.0	U+1B100..1B11E	31	L2/09-201		McGowan, Rick (2009-05-07), Type sample page image, hentaigana, 1903
10.0	U+1B100..1B11E	31	L2/11-229	N4091 (pdf, doc)	Notes on hentaigana, 2011-06-01
10.0	U+1B100..1B11E	31		N4103	"11.1.2 Hentaigana characters", Unconfirmed minutes of WG 2 meeting 58, 2012-01-03
10.0	U+1B100..1B11E	31		N4553 (pdf, doc)	Umamaheswaran, V. S. (2014-09-16), "M62.04b, M62.05b", Minutes of WG 2 meeting 62 Adobe, San Jose, CA, USA
10.0	U+1B100..1B11E	31	L2/15-193	N4670	Orita, Tetsuji (2015-07-23), Request for Comments on HENTAIGANA proposal
10.0	U+1B100..1B11E	31	L2/15-239	N4674	Proposal of Japanese HENTAIGANA, 2015-09-18
10.0	U+1B100..1B11E	31	L2/15-300		Tashiro, Shuichi (2015-10-31), Hentaigana List after Matsue discussion
10.0	U+1B100..1B11E	31	L2/15-312		Anderson, Deborah; Whistler, Ken; McGowan, Rick; Pournader, Roozbeh; Glass, Andrew; Iancu, Laurențiu (2015-11-01), "8. Hentaigana", Recommendations to UTC #145 November 2015 on Script Proposals
10.0	U+1B100..1B11E	31	L2/15-316		Takada, Tomokazu; Yada, Tsutomu; Saito, Tatsuya (2015-11-03), The past, present, and future of hentaigana [in Japanese]
10.0	U+1B100..1B11E	31	L2/15-318 (pdf, xlsx)		Yada, Tsutomu (2015-11-04), About the inclusion of standardized codepoints for Hentaigana
10.0	U+1B100..1B11E	31	L2/15-334		Tranter, Nicolas (2015-12-09), Hentaigana proposal
10.0	U+1B100..1B11E	31	L2/15-343 (pdf, xlsx)	N4708	Orita, Tetsuji (2015-12-09), Revised Proposal of HENTAIGANA
10.0	U+1B100..1B11E	31	L2/16-053		Lunde, Ken (2015-12-16), Hentaigana Comment Document
10.0	U+1B100..1B11E	31	L2/16-037		Anderson, Deborah; Whistler, Ken; McGowan, Rick; Pournader, Roozbeh; Glass, Andrew; Iancu, Laurențiu (2016-01-22), "16", Recommendations to UTC #146 January 2016 on Script Proposals
10.0	U+1B100..1B11E	31	L2/16-040		Lunde, Ken (2016-01-26), Hentaigana Unification Candidates
10.0	U+1B100..1B11E	31	L2/16-085		Lunde, Ken (2016-04-28), Status of hentaigana proposal
10.0	U+1B100..1B11E	31	L2/16-123		"Two comments on hentaigana proposal", Comments on Public Review Issues (Jan 22, 2016 - May 03, 2016), 2016-05-05
10.0	U+1B100..1B11E	31	L2/16-121		Moore, Lisa (2016-05-20), "C.3", UTC #147 Minutes
10.0	U+1B100..1B11E	31	L2/16-188 (pdf, xlsx)	N4732	Revised Proposal of Hentaigana, 2016-06-20
10.0	U+1B100..1B11E	31	L2/16-216		Anderson, Deborah; Whistler, Ken; McGowan, Rick; Pournader, Roozbeh; Glass, Andrew; Iancu, Laurențiu; Moore, Lisa (2016-07-30), "6.a", Recommendations to UTC #148 August 2016 on Script Proposals
10.0	U+1B100..1B11E	31	L2/16-203		Moore, Lisa (2016-08-18), "C.3.1", UTC #148 Minutes
10.0	U+1B100..1B11E	31		N4873R (pdf, doc)	"10.3.2", Unconfirmed minutes of WG 2 meeting 65, 2018-03-16
10.0	U+1B100..1B11E	31	L2/16-325		Moore, Lisa (2016-11-18), "B.1.1.4, B.13.3.1", UTC #149 Minutes
14.0	U+1B11F..1B122	4	L2/19-381		Gross, Abraham (2020-01-05), Proposal to Encode Missing Japanese Kana
14.0	U+1B11F..1B122	4	L2/20-046		Anderson, Deborah; Whistler, Ken; Pournader, Roozbeh; Moore, Lisa; Liang, Hai (2020-01-10), "11a.", Recommendations to UTC #162 January 2020 on Script Proposals
14.0	U+1B11F..1B122	4	L2/20-015R		Moore, Lisa (2020-05-14), "C.6.1 Proposal to encode missing Japanese kana", Draft Minutes of UTC Meeting 162
14.0	U+1B11F..1B122	4	L2/20-152		Gross, Abraham (2020-06-24), Base Character of HIRAGANA LETTER ARCHAIC WU
14.0	U+1B11F..1B122	4	L2/20-169		Anderson, Deborah; Whistler, Ken; Pournader, Roozbeh; Moore, Lisa; Constable, Peter; Liang, Hai (2020-07-21), "22. Kana", Recommendations to UTC #164 July 2020 on Script Proposals
14.0	U+1B11F..1B122	4	L2/20-172		Moore, Lisa (2020-08-03), "Action Item 164-A41", UTC #164 Minutes
18.0	U+1B123..1B125	3	L2/23-112		Kojitani, Gen (2023-04-26), Proposal for missing Kana-Ligatures
18.0	U+1B123..1B125	3	L2/23-163		Lunde, Ken (2023-07-11), "23", CJK & Unihan Group Recommendations for UTC #176 Meeting
18.0	U+1B123..1B125	3	L2/24-150		Kojitani, Gen (2024-06-21), Proposal for missing three Kana-Ligatures
18.0	U+1B123..1B125	3	L2/24-165		Lunde, Ken (2024-07-11), "15", CJK & Unihan Working Group Recommendations for UTC #180 Meeting
18.0	U+1B123..1B125	3	L2/24-159		Constable, Peter (2024-07-29), "Consensus 180-C6", UTC #180 Minutes, "Provisionally assign ..."
18.0	U+1B126	1	L2/24-279		Sim, CheonHyeong (2024-12-30), Proposal to Encode One Kana Ligature
18.0	U+1B126	1	L2/25-009		Lunde, Ken (2025-01-10), "14", CJK & Unihan Working Group Recommendations for UTC #182 Meeting
18.0	U+1B126	1	L2/25-010		Kučera, Jan; et al. (2025-01-16), "6.8 KATAKANA DIGRAPH YORI", Recommendations to UTC #182 (January 2025) on Script Proposals
18.0	U+1B126	1	L2/25-003		Leroy, Robin (2025-01-28), "Consensus 182-C31", UTC #182 Minutes, "Provisionally assign U+1B126 KATAKANA DIGRAPH YORI ..."
18.0	U+1B126	1	L2/25-226		"Consensus 185-C40", UTC #185 Minutes, 2025-10-29, "UTC accepts for encoding in Unicode 18.0 ..."
18.0	U+1B127..1B128	2	L2/23-127		Chan, Eiso (2023-05-31), Introduction on two unencoded Katakana letters
18.0	U+1B127..1B128	2	L2/23-163		Lunde, Ken (2023-07-11), "25", CJK & Unihan Group Recommendations for UTC #176 Meeting
18.0	U+1B127..1B128	2	L2/25-151R		Chan, Eiso (2025-07-05), Proposal on two archaic Katakana letters
18.0	U+1B127..1B128	2	L2/25-181		Leroy, Robin (2025-08-07), "Consensus 184-C38", UTC #184 Minutes, "Provisionally assign ..."
18.0	U+1B127..1B128	2	L2/25-226		"Consensus 185-C40", UTC #185 Minutes, 2025-10-29, "UTC accepts for encoding in Unicode 18.0 ..."

== See also ==
- Kana Supplement (Unicode block)
- Small Kana Extension (Unicode block)
- Hiragana (Unicode block)
- Katakana (Unicode block)
- Kana Extended-B (Unicode block)
