= Small Kana Extension =

- Range: U+1B130..U+1B16F (64 code points)
- Plane: SMP
- Scripts: Hiragana (4 char.); Katakana (6 char.)
- Assigned: 10 code points
- Unused: 54 reserved code points

Unicode Version History
- 12.0 (2019): 7 (+7)
- 15.0 (2022): 9 (+2)
- 18.0 (2026): 10 (+1)

Unicode documentation
- Code chart ∣ Web page

Small Kana Extension is a Unicode block containing additional small variants for the Hiragana and Katakana syllabaries, in addition to those in the Hiragana, Katakana and Katakana Phonetic Extensions blocks.

== Block ==
Small Kana Extension^{[1]}^{[2]} Official Unicode Consortium code chart (PDF)
	0	1	2	3	4	5	6	7	8	9	A	B	C	D	E	F
U+1B13x			𛄲													
U+1B14x																
U+1B15x	𛅐	𛅑	𛅒			𛅕										
U+1B16x					𛅤	𛅥	𛅦	𛅧	𛅨							
Notes 1.As of Unicode version 18.0 2.Grey areas indicate non-assigned code points

Unassigned code points in the U+1B130 to U+1B163 range were set aside for possible future small kana.

== History ==
The following Unicode-related documents record the purpose and process of defining specific characters in the Small Kana Extension block:

Version	Final code points (Note: Proposed code points and characters names may differ from final code points and names)	Count	L2 ID	WG2 ID	Document
12.0	U+1B150..1B152, 1B164..1B167	7	L2/16-334		Sim, CheonHyeong (2016-11-04), Hiragana and Katakana (Small Letters)
12.0	U+1B150..1B152, 1B164..1B167	7	L2/16-354		Yamaguchi, Ryusei (2016-11-07), Proposal to add Kana small letters
12.0	U+1B150..1B152, 1B164..1B167	7	L2/16-358R	N4803	Lunde, Ken (2016-11-22), L2/16-334 & L2/16-354 Feedback (small kana)
12.0	U+1B150..1B152, 1B164..1B167	7	L2/16-325		Moore, Lisa (2016-11-18), "C.14 Kana", UTC #149 Minutes
12.0	U+1B150..1B152, 1B164..1B167	7	L2/17-016		Moore, Lisa (2017-02-08), "Consensus 150-C18", UTC #150 Minutes
12.0	U+1B150..1B152, 1B164..1B167	7		N4953 (pdf, doc)	"M66.07i", Unconfirmed minutes of WG 2 meeting 66, 2018-03-23
12.0	U+1B150..1B152, 1B164..1B167	7	L2/17-353		Anderson, Deborah; Whistler, Ken (2017-10-02), "N.1. Small Kana Extension code block and code point changes", WG2 Consent Docket
12.0	U+1B150..1B152, 1B164..1B167	7	L2/17-362		Moore, Lisa (2018-02-02), "Consensus 153-C13", UTC #153 Minutes
15.0	U+1B132, 1B155	2	L2/10-468R2	N3987	Lunde, Ken (2011-02-09), Proposal to add two kana characters
15.0	U+1B132, 1B155	2	L2/11-016		Moore, Lisa (2011-02-15), "Consensus 126-C7", UTC #126 / L2 #223 Minutes, "Accept U+1B002 HIRAGANA LETTER SMALL KO and U+1B003 KATAKANA LETTER SMALL KO for encoding in a future version of the standard."
15.0	U+1B132, 1B155	2	L2/11-228	N4087	Comment on "two kana" proposal, 2011-05-30
15.0	U+1B132, 1B155	2		N4108	Sekiguchi, Masahiro (2011-06-08), A response regarding small ko
15.0	U+1B132, 1B155	2		N4103	"11.2.7 Two additional Kana characters", Unconfirmed minutes of WG 2 meeting 58, 2012-01-03
15.0	U+1B132, 1B155	2	L2/16-354		Yamaguchi, Ryusei (2016-11-07), Proposal to add Kana small letters
15.0	U+1B132, 1B155	2	L2/16-358R	N4803	Lunde, Ken (2016-11-22), L2/16-334 & L2/16-354 Feedback (small kana)
15.0	U+1B132, 1B155	2	L2/16-325		Moore, Lisa (2016-11-18), "Consensus 149-C14", UTC #149 Minutes, "Move HIRAGANA LETTER SMALL KO to U+1B127 and KATAKANA LETTER SMALL KO to U+1B128."
15.0	U+1B132, 1B155	2	L2/17-353		Anderson, Deborah; Whistler, Ken (2017-10-02), "N.2. SMALL KO characters", WG2 Consent Docket, "WG2 agreed to remove ... two characters from the Small Kana Extension block"
15.0	U+1B132, 1B155	2	L2/20-015R		Moore, Lisa (2020-05-14), "Consensus 162-C21", Draft Minutes of UTC Meeting 162, "Change the codepoint for HIRAGANA LETTER SMALL KO from U+1B127 to U+1B132, and KATAKANA LETTER SMALL KO from U+1B12B to U+1B155."
18.0	U+1B168	1	L2/25-036		Sim, CheonHyeong (2025-01-15), Proposal to Encode One Small Kana Letter
18.0	U+1B168	1	L2/25-090		Lunde, Ken (2025-04-11), "21", CJK & Unihan Working Group Recommendations for UTC Meeting #183
18.0	U+1B168	1	L2/25-085		Leroy, Robin (2025-04-28), "Consensus 183-C54", UTC #183 Minutes, "Provisionally assign U+1B168 ..."
18.0	U+1B168	1	L2/25-226		"Consensus 185-C40", UTC #185 Minutes, 2025-10-29, "UTC accepts for encoding in Unicode 18.0 ..."

== Fonts ==
As of 28 March 2024, 2 fonts are known to support the 15.0 Small Kana Extension range:

- BabelStone Han.
- Nishiki-teki.

=== Other fonts ===
- FRBTaiwaneseKana supports 𛅦 (U+1B166), but none of the other 8 characters.

== See also ==
- Hiragana (Unicode block)
- Katakana (Unicode block)
- Kana Extended-A (Unicode block)
- Kana Extended-B (Unicode block)
- Kana Supplement (Unicode block)
