= Sōgana =

Archaic Japanese syllabary

Chart showing various Japanese characters in their man'yōgana, sogana (red) and hiragana forms.

Sōgana (草仮名; lit. grass kana) is an archaic Japanese syllabary, now used for aesthetic purposes only. It represents an intermediate cursive form between historic man'yōgana script and modern hiragana. Sōgana appears primarily in Heian era texts, most notably the Eiga Monogatari (栄花物語; trans., Story of Splendor) and The Pillow Book (枕草子, Makura no Sōshi). Originating from cursive forms of the man'yōgana characters, commonly occurring sōgana were further adapted and by the early eleventh century had evolved into the forms of modern hiragana.

The principal purpose of Sōgana—nowadays its only use—was for artistic effect. It was often used for the rendition of poetry, as in the work of Fujiwara Kozei, whose style is often cited to exemplify the use of sōgana. However, attribution of the few surviving sōgana works is disputed.
