= Hentaigana =

Japanese writing variant of hiragana

Hentaigana 変体仮名 変体がな 變體假名 變體がな itaigana (異体仮名)
- Script type: Syllabary
- Period: c. 800 – 1900 CE; minor use at present
- Languages: Japanese

Related scripts
- Parent systems: Oracle bone script: Seal script; Clerical script; Regular script (kanji); Man'yōgana; Sōgana; Hentaigana
- Sister systems: Katakana, Hiragana

ISO 15924
- ISO 15924: Hira (410), Hiragana

Unicode
- Unicode alias: Hiragana
- Unicode range: U+1B000–U+1B0FF Kana Supplement; U+1B100–U+1B12F Kana Extended-A

In the Japanese writing system, hentaigana (変体仮名, 変体がな; Japanese pronunciation: [hentaiɡana] or [hentaꜜiɡana], lit. "variant kana") (Note: The hentai (変体: "variant" or "irregular form") in this word is not the same as the hentai (変態) which means "abnormal" or "pervert".) are variant forms of hiragana.

== Description ==
In contrast to modern Japanese, hiragana historically had several distinct forms representing a single sound. For example, while the hiragana reading ha has only one form in modern Japanese (は), until the Meiji era (1868–1912) it was written in various forms, including,, and. The shift to using only one character for each sound occurred as part of the 1900 script reform, which also included other changes to the written language to standardize spelling (and was part of a larger project to westernize the country).

As a result of this state-mandated standardization of hiragana, variant kana have fallen into disuse in modern Japan, save for limited situations such as signboards, calligraphy, place names, and personal names. Today, those hiragana glyphs not used in school education since 1900 as a result of the script reform are called hentaigana.

== History ==
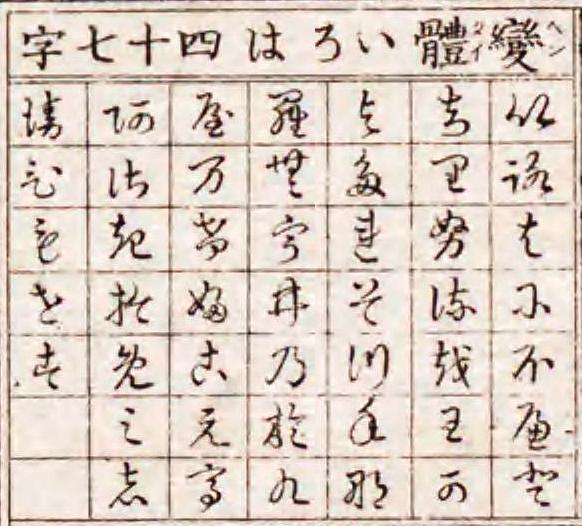
Hentai iroha 47-ji (1886): an iroha kana syllabary written entirely in hentaigana

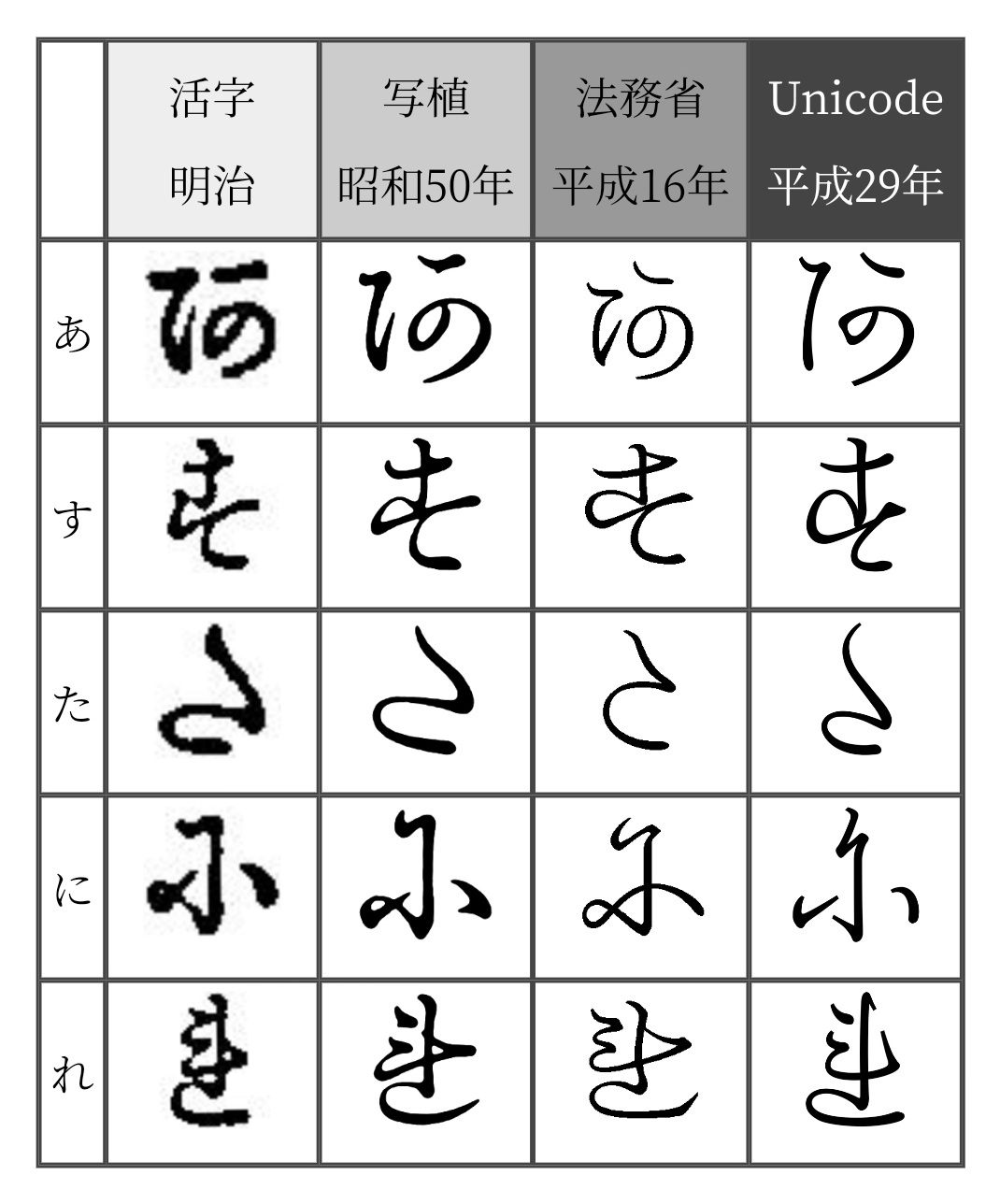
Comparison of the glyphs of hentaigana. From the left is the Meiji period, 1975, 2004 and 2017.

Hiragana, the main Japanese syllabic writing system, derived from a cursive form of man'yōgana, a system where Chinese ideograms (kanji) were used to write sounds without regard to their meaning. Originally, the same syllable (more precisely, mora) could be represented by several more-or-less interchangeable kanji, or different cursive styles of the same kanji. However, the 1900 script reform determined that only one specific character be used for each mora, with the rest being called hentaigana ("variant characters").

The 1900 standard included the hiragana ゐ, ゑ, and を, which historically stood for the phonetically distinct moras /wi/, /we/, and /wo/ but are currently pronounced as /i/, /e/, and /o/, identically to い, え, and お. These characters were deprecated by the 1946 spelling reform, except for the character を, which is still used in the Japanese writing system for the direct object particle /-o/.

Hentaigana are still used occasionally today in some contexts, such as store signs and logos, to achieve the "old-fashioned" or "traditional" look.

Katakana also has variant forms, such as (ネ) and (ヰ). However, katakana's variant forms are fewer than hiragana's. Katakana's choices of man'yōgana segments had stabilized early on and established – with few exceptions – an unambiguous phonemic orthography (one symbol per sound) long before the 1900 script regularization.

== Standardized hentaigana ==
Before the proposal which led to the inclusion of hentaigana in Unicode 10.0, they were already standardized into a list by Mojikiban, part of the Japanese Information-technology Promotion Agency (IPA).

	a	i	u	e	o
ひ	あ(安)	い(以)	う(宇)	え(衣)	お(於)
∅	𛀂(安) 𛀅(惡) 𛀃(愛) 𛀄(阿)	𛀆(以) 𛀇(伊) 𛀈(意) 𛀉(移)	𛀊(宇) 𛀋(宇) 𛀌(憂) 𛀍(有) 𛀎(雲)	𛀁(江) 𛀏(盈) 𛀐(縁) 𛀑(衣) 𛀒(衣) 𛀓(要)	𛀔(於) 𛀕(於) 𛀖(隱)
k	か(加)	き(幾)	く(久)	け(計)	こ(己)
k	𛀗(佳) 𛀘(加) 𛀙(可) 𛀚(可) 𛀛(嘉) 𛀢(家) 𛀜(我) 𛀝(歟) 𛀞(賀) 𛀟(閑) 𛀠(香) 𛀡(駕)	𛀣(喜) 𛀤(幾) 𛀥(幾) 𛀦(支) 𛀻(期) 𛀧(木) 𛀨(祈) 𛀩(貴) 𛀪(起)	𛀫(久) 𛀬(久) 𛀭(九) 𛀮(供) 𛀯(倶) 𛀰(具) 𛀱(求)	𛀳(介) 𛀲(介) 𛀢(家) 𛀴(希) 𛀵(氣) 𛀶(計) 𛀷(遣)	𛀸(古) 𛂘(子) 𛀹(故) 𛀻(期) 𛀺(許)
s	さ(左)	し(之)	す(寸)	せ(世)	そ(曾)
s	𛀼(乍) 𛀽(佐) 𛀾(佐) 𛀿(左) 𛁀(差) 𛁁(散) 𛁂(斜) 𛁃(沙)	𛁄(之) 𛁅(之) 𛁆(事) 𛁇(四) 𛁈(志) 𛁉(新)	𛁊(受) 𛁋(壽) 𛁌(數) 𛁍(數) 𛁎(春) 𛁏(春) 𛁐(須) 𛁑(須)	𛁒(世) 𛁓(世) 𛁔(世) 𛁕(勢) 𛁖(聲)	𛁗(所) 𛁘(所) 𛁙(曾) 𛁚(曾) 𛁛(楚) 𛁜(蘇) 𛁝(處)
t	た(太)	ち(知)	つ(川)	て(天)	と(止)
t	𛁞(堂) 𛁟(多) 𛁠(多) 𛁡(當)	𛁢(千) 𛁣(地) 𛁤(智) 𛁥(知) 𛁦(知) 𛁧(致) 𛁨(遲)	𛁩(川) 𛁪(川) 𛁫(津) 𛁬(都) 𛁭(徒)	𛁮(亭) 𛁯(低) 𛁰(傳) 𛁱(天) 𛁲(天) 𛁳(天) 𛁴(帝) 𛁵(弖) 𛁶(轉) 𛂎(而)	𛁷(土) 𛁸(度) 𛁹(東) 𛁺(登) 𛁻(登) 𛁼(砥) 𛁽(等) 𛁭(徒)
n	な(奈)	に(仁)	ぬ(奴)	ね(祢)	の(乃)
n	𛁾(南) 𛁿(名) 𛂀(奈) 𛂁(奈) 𛂂(奈) 𛂃(菜) 𛂄(那) 𛂅(那) 𛂆(難)	𛂇(丹) 𛂈(二) 𛂉(仁) 𛂊(兒) 𛂋(爾) 𛂌(爾) 𛂍(耳) 𛂎(而)	𛂏(努) 𛂐(奴) 𛂑(怒)	𛂒(年) 𛂓(年) 𛂔(年) 𛂕(根) 𛂖(熱) 𛂗(禰) 𛂘(子)	𛂙(乃) 𛂚(濃) 𛂛(能) 𛂜(能) 𛂝(農)
h	は(波)	ひ(比)	ふ(不)	へ(部)	ほ(保)
h	𛂞(八) 𛂟(半) 𛂠(婆) 𛂡(波) 𛂢(盤) 𛂣(盤) 𛂤(破) 𛂥(者) 𛂦(者) 𛂧(葉) 𛂨(頗)	𛂩(悲) 𛂪(日) 𛂫(比) 𛂬(避) 𛂭(非) 𛂮(飛) 𛂯(飛)	𛂰(不) 𛂱(婦) 𛂲(布)	𛂳(倍) 𛂴(弊) 𛂵(弊) 𛂶(遍) 𛂷(邊) 𛂸(邊) 𛂹(部)	𛂺(保) 𛂻(保) 𛂼(報) 𛂽(奉) 𛂾(寶) 𛂿(本) 𛃀(本) 𛃁(豊)
m	ま(末)	み(美)	む(武)	め(女)	も(毛)
m	𛃂(万) 𛃃(末) 𛃄(末) 𛃅(滿) 𛃆(滿) 𛃇(萬) 𛃈(麻) 𛃖(馬)	𛃉(三) 𛃊(微) 𛃋(美) 𛃌(美) 𛃍(美) 𛃎(見) 𛃏(身)	𛃐(武) 𛃑(無) 𛃒(牟) 𛃓(舞) 𛄝(无) 𛄞(无)	𛃔(免) 𛃕(面) 𛃖(馬)	𛃗(母) 𛃘(毛) 𛃙(毛) 𛃚(毛) 𛃛(茂) 𛃜(裳) 𛄝(无) 𛄞(无)
y	や(也)	𛀆(以)	ゆ(由)	𛀁(江)	よ(与)
y	𛃝(也) 𛃞(也) 𛃟(屋) 𛃠(耶) 𛃡(耶) 𛃢(夜)	𛀆(以)	𛃣(游) 𛃤(由) 𛃥(由) 𛃦(遊)	𛀁(江)	𛃧(代) 𛃨(余) 𛃩(與) 𛃪(與) 𛃫(與) 𛃬(餘) 𛃢(夜)
r	ら(良)	り(利)	る(留)	れ(礼)	ろ(呂)
r	𛃭(羅) 𛃮(良) 𛃯(良) 𛃰(良) 𛁽(等)	𛃱(利) 𛃲(利) 𛃳(李) 𛃴(梨) 𛃵(理) 𛃶(里) 𛃷(離)	𛃸(流) 𛃹(留) 𛃺(留) 𛃻(留) 𛃼(累) 𛃽(類)	𛃾(禮) 𛃿(礼) 𛄀(連) 𛄁(麗)	𛄂(呂) 𛄃(呂) 𛄄(婁) 𛄅(樓) 𛄆(路) 𛄇(露)
w	わ(和)	ゐ(為)	𛄟(汙)	ゑ(恵)	を(遠)
w	𛄈(倭) 𛄉(和) 𛄊(和) 𛄋(王) 𛄌(王)	𛄍(井) 𛄎(井) 𛄏(居) 𛄐(爲) 𛄑(遺)		𛄒(惠) 𛄓(衞) 𛄔(衞) 𛄕(衞)	𛄖(乎) 𛄗(乎) 𛄘(尾) 𛄙(緒) 𛄚(越) 𛄛(遠) 𛄜(遠) 𛀅(惡)
N	ん(无)				
N	𛄝(无) 𛄞(无)				

To view hentaigana, special fonts need to be installed that support Hentaigana such as:

- BabelStone Han
- IPA MJ Mincho (Version 5.01 and later)
- Hanazono Mincho
- Hanazono Mincho AFDKO
- UniHentaiKana
- Nishiki-teki
- Noto Serif Hentaigana

The glyph for example Hiragana wu (𛄟) also needs a special font to display such as

- Uraniwa Mincho X

== Sources ==
Hentaigana are adapted from the reduced and cursive forms of the following man’yōgana (kanji) characters. Source characters for the kana are not repeated below for hentaigana even when there are alternative glyphs; some are uncertain.

Kanji origins of kana
		Hiragana	Katakana	Hentaigana
∅	あ	安	阿	安悪亜阿
∅	い	以	伊	以伊意移異夷
∅	う	宇		宇有雲憂羽于
∅	え	衣	江	江盈衣要得縁延
∅	お	於		於隱
K	か	加		佳加閑可我駕賀歌哥香家嘉歟謌佳
K	き	機幾		幾支起貴喜祈季木
K	く	久		久倶具求九供
K	け	計	介	介家遣氣 (気) 希个
K	こ	己		許故古期興子
S	さ	左	散	佐斜沙差乍狭散
S	し	之		之志四新事斯師
S	す	寸	須	受須春數壽爪
S	せ	世		世勢聲瀬
S	そ	曽 (曾)		曾所楚處蘇
T	た	太	多	多當堂田佗
T	ち	知	千	千知地遲治致智池馳
T	つ	川	川州	川徒都津頭
T	て	天		停亭轉弖帝傳偏氐低而
T	と	止		東登度等斗刀戸土砥徒
N	な	奈		奈那難名南菜
N	に	仁	仁二	仁爾耳二児 (兒) 丹尼而
N	ぬ	奴		怒努駑
N	ね	祢 (禰)		年子熱念音根寢禰
N	の	乃		乃能濃農廼野
H	は	波	八	八者盤半葉頗婆芳羽破
H	ひ	比		日比飛悲非火避備妣
H	ふ	不		不婦布風
H	へ	部		旁倍遍弊邊閉敝幣反變 (変) 辨經部
H	ほ	保		保寶 (宝) 本報奉穂豊 (豐)
M	ま	末		万万満萬眞馬間麻摩漫
M	み	美	三	三微美見微身民
M	む	武	牟	武無 (无) 牟舞務夢
M	め	女		免面馬目妻
M	も	毛		毛母裳茂无蒙藻
Y	や	也		也夜耶屋哉
Y	𛀆	以		以
Y	ゆ	由		由遊 (游)
Y	𛀁	江	衣	江
Y	よ	與 (与)		代與餘余世夜
R	ら	良		羅良蘭落等
R	り	利		利梨里離理李
R	る	留	流	流留累類
R	れ	礼 (禮)		礼 (禮) 連麗豊 (豐)
R	ろ	呂		婁呂 (娄) 樓路露侶廬魯論
W	わ	和		和王倭
W	ゐ	為	井	井居為委遺
W	𛄟	汙	宇	
W	ゑ	恵 (惠)		恵衛 (衞) 彗
W	を	遠	乎	乎越尾緒遠
N	ん	无	无尓 (爾)	无

== In Unicode ==
286 hentaigana characters are included in the Unicode Standard in the Kana Supplement and Kana Extended-A blocks. One character was added to Unicode version 6.0 in 2010, 𛀁 (U+1B001 HIRAGANA LETTER ARCHAIC YE which has the formal alias HENTAIGANA LETTER E-1), and the remaining 285 hentaigana characters were added in Unicode version 10.0 in June 2017.

The Unicode block for Kana Supplement is U+1B000–U+1B0FF:

Kana Supplement^{[1]} Official Unicode Consortium code chart (PDF)
	0	1	2	3	4	5	6	7	8	9	A	B	C	D	E	F
U+1B00x	𛀀	𛀁	𛀂	𛀃	𛀄	𛀅	𛀆	𛀇	𛀈	𛀉	𛀊	𛀋	𛀌	𛀍	𛀎	𛀏
U+1B01x	𛀐	𛀑	𛀒	𛀓	𛀔	𛀕	𛀖	𛀗	𛀘	𛀙	𛀚	𛀛	𛀜	𛀝	𛀞	𛀟
U+1B02x	𛀠	𛀡	𛀢	𛀣	𛀤	𛀥	𛀦	𛀧	𛀨	𛀩	𛀪	𛀫	𛀬	𛀭	𛀮	𛀯
U+1B03x	𛀰	𛀱	𛀲	𛀳	𛀴	𛀵	𛀶	𛀷	𛀸	𛀹	𛀺	𛀻	𛀼	𛀽	𛀾	𛀿
U+1B04x	𛁀	𛁁	𛁂	𛁃	𛁄	𛁅	𛁆	𛁇	𛁈	𛁉	𛁊	𛁋	𛁌	𛁍	𛁎	𛁏
U+1B05x	𛁐	𛁑	𛁒	𛁓	𛁔	𛁕	𛁖	𛁗	𛁘	𛁙	𛁚	𛁛	𛁜	𛁝	𛁞	𛁟
U+1B06x	𛁠	𛁡	𛁢	𛁣	𛁤	𛁥	𛁦	𛁧	𛁨	𛁩	𛁪	𛁫	𛁬	𛁭	𛁮	𛁯
U+1B07x	𛁰	𛁱	𛁲	𛁳	𛁴	𛁵	𛁶	𛁷	𛁸	𛁹	𛁺	𛁻	𛁼	𛁽	𛁾	𛁿
U+1B08x	𛂀	𛂁	𛂂	𛂃	𛂄	𛂅	𛂆	𛂇	𛂈	𛂉	𛂊	𛂋	𛂌	𛂍	𛂎	𛂏
U+1B09x	𛂐	𛂑	𛂒	𛂓	𛂔	𛂕	𛂖	𛂗	𛂘	𛂙	𛂚	𛂛	𛂜	𛂝	𛂞	𛂟
U+1B0Ax	𛂠	𛂡	𛂢	𛂣	𛂤	𛂥	𛂦	𛂧	𛂨	𛂩	𛂪	𛂫	𛂬	𛂭	𛂮	𛂯
U+1B0Bx	𛂰	𛂱	𛂲	𛂳	𛂴	𛂵	𛂶	𛂷	𛂸	𛂹	𛂺	𛂻	𛂼	𛂽	𛂾	𛂿
U+1B0Cx	𛃀	𛃁	𛃂	𛃃	𛃄	𛃅	𛃆	𛃇	𛃈	𛃉	𛃊	𛃋	𛃌	𛃍	𛃎	𛃏
U+1B0Dx	𛃐	𛃑	𛃒	𛃓	𛃔	𛃕	𛃖	𛃗	𛃘	𛃙	𛃚	𛃛	𛃜	𛃝	𛃞	𛃟
U+1B0Ex	𛃠	𛃡	𛃢	𛃣	𛃤	𛃥	𛃦	𛃧	𛃨	𛃩	𛃪	𛃫	𛃬	𛃭	𛃮	𛃯
U+1B0Fx	𛃰	𛃱	𛃲	𛃳	𛃴	𛃵	𛃶	𛃷	𛃸	𛃹	𛃺	𛃻	𛃼	𛃽	𛃾	𛃿
Notes 1.As of Unicode version 17.0

The Unicode block for Kana Extended-A is U+1B100–U+1B12F:

Kana Extended-A^{[1]}^{[2]} Official Unicode Consortium code chart (PDF)
	0	1	2	3	4	5	6	7	8	9	A	B	C	D	E	F
U+1B10x	𛄀	𛄁	𛄂	𛄃	𛄄	𛄅	𛄆	𛄇	𛄈	𛄉	𛄊	𛄋	𛄌	𛄍	𛄎	𛄏
U+1B11x	𛄐	𛄑	𛄒	𛄓	𛄔	𛄕	𛄖	𛄗	𛄘	𛄙	𛄚	𛄛	𛄜	𛄝	𛄞	𛄟
U+1B12x	𛄠	𛄡	𛄢	𛄣	𛄤	𛄥	𛄦	𛄧	𛄨							
Notes 1.As of Unicode version 18.0 2.Grey areas indicate non-assigned code points

== Modern usage ==
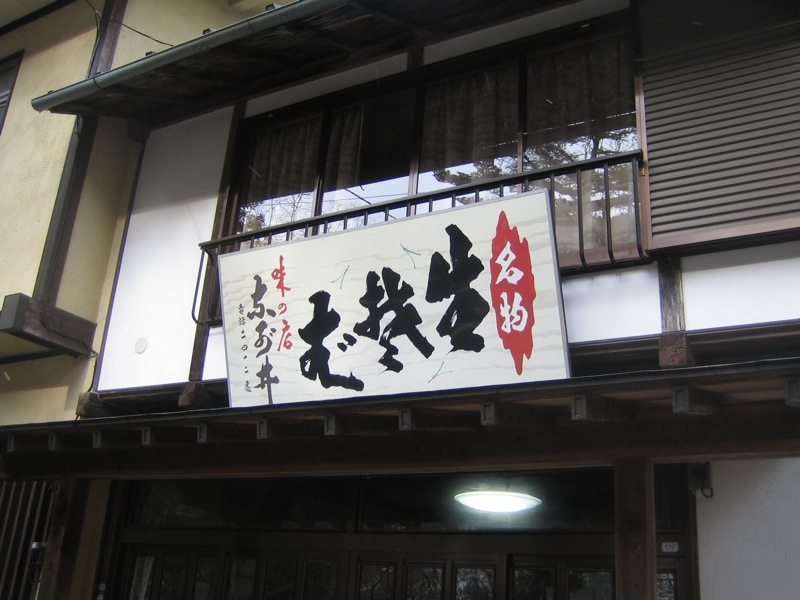
A soba restaurant: written right-to-left, the sign reads 生𛁛𛂦゙ 𛂁𛀙゙𛄍 (namasoba nagawi). 生𛁛𛂦゙ (namasoba) equates to 生そば ("fresh soba"), and consists of the kanji 生 (nama) followed by hentaigana derived from the kanji 楚 (so) and 者 (with dakuten: ba). The black vertical text 𛂁𛀙゙𛄍 (nagawi) equates to ながゐ, the historical kana spelling of ながい (nagai, "long visit"), and consists of hentaigana derived from 奈 (na), 可 (with dakuten: ga) and 井 (wi).

While hentaigana started out as handwritten cursive variants of hiragana, they were used well into the modern era in printed books during the Meiji era, albeit with inconsistency. They occur sporadically in hiragana-heavy text. Some books were typeset with regular hiragana and their hentaigana variants on the same line. Here is a text sample from an 1893 book:

形容動詞と𛂞、もの事の品位、性質、分量等を意味𛁑る詞をいひます。形容動詞に、左の二類ありま𛁏。
㈠久活………善(よ) く く し き 𛀳れ
㈡志久活……惡(あ)しく しく し しき 𛁈けれ

— Shiratori Kikuji, 雅文俗文作文語格, 形容動詞

In this sample, 𛂞 is a variant of は, 𛁑 and 𛁏 of す, 𛀳 of け, and 𛁈 of し. Another book was typeset with two different spellings for the same phrase tatoe-ba: たとへ𛂞゙ and たとへば. The same word, nashi, can be spelt with regular hiragana (なし) and hentaigana (𛂁し) on the same page.

The choice between different hiragana and hentaigana could be contextual. For example, か, 𛁈 and 𛂦 may be used at the beginning of a word, while 𛀙, 𛁅 and 𛂡 may be used elsewhere, while 𛂞 (Note: Not to be confused with the katakana ハ.) was used extensively specifically for the topic particle.

Hentaigana are now considered obsolete, but a few marginal uses remain. For example, otemoto (chopsticks), is written in hentaigana on some wrappers and many soba shops use hentaigana to spell kisoba on their signs. (See also: "Ye Olde" for "the old" on English signs.)

Hentaigana are used in some formal handwritten documents, particularly in certificates issued by classical Japanese cultural groups (e.g., martial arts schools, etiquette schools, religious study groups, etc.). Also, they are occasionally used in reproductions of classic Japanese texts, akin to blackletter in English and other Germanic languages to give an archaic flair. Modern poems may be composed and printed in hentaigana for visual effect.

However, most Japanese people cannot read hentaigana that are not different cursive styles of the original kanji of their standard Hiragana or Katakana nowadays, only recognizing a few from their common use in shop signs, or figuring them out from context.

== Gallery ==
Some of the following hentaigana are cursive forms of the same kanji as their standard hiragana counterparts, but simplified differently. Others descend from unrelated kanji that represent the same sound.

以（い）i

江（え）e

於（お）o

可（か）ka, ga

起（き）ki, gi

古（こ）ko, go

志（し）shi, ji

春（す）su, zu

多（た）ta, da

奈（な）na

能（の）no

者（は）ha, ba

由（ゆ）yu

連（れ）re

路（ろ）ro

王（わ）wa

== See also ==
- Furigana
- Romaji
