= Lhasa Library =

Public library in Lhasa, Tibet, China

Coordinates: 29.65704°N 91.18083°E

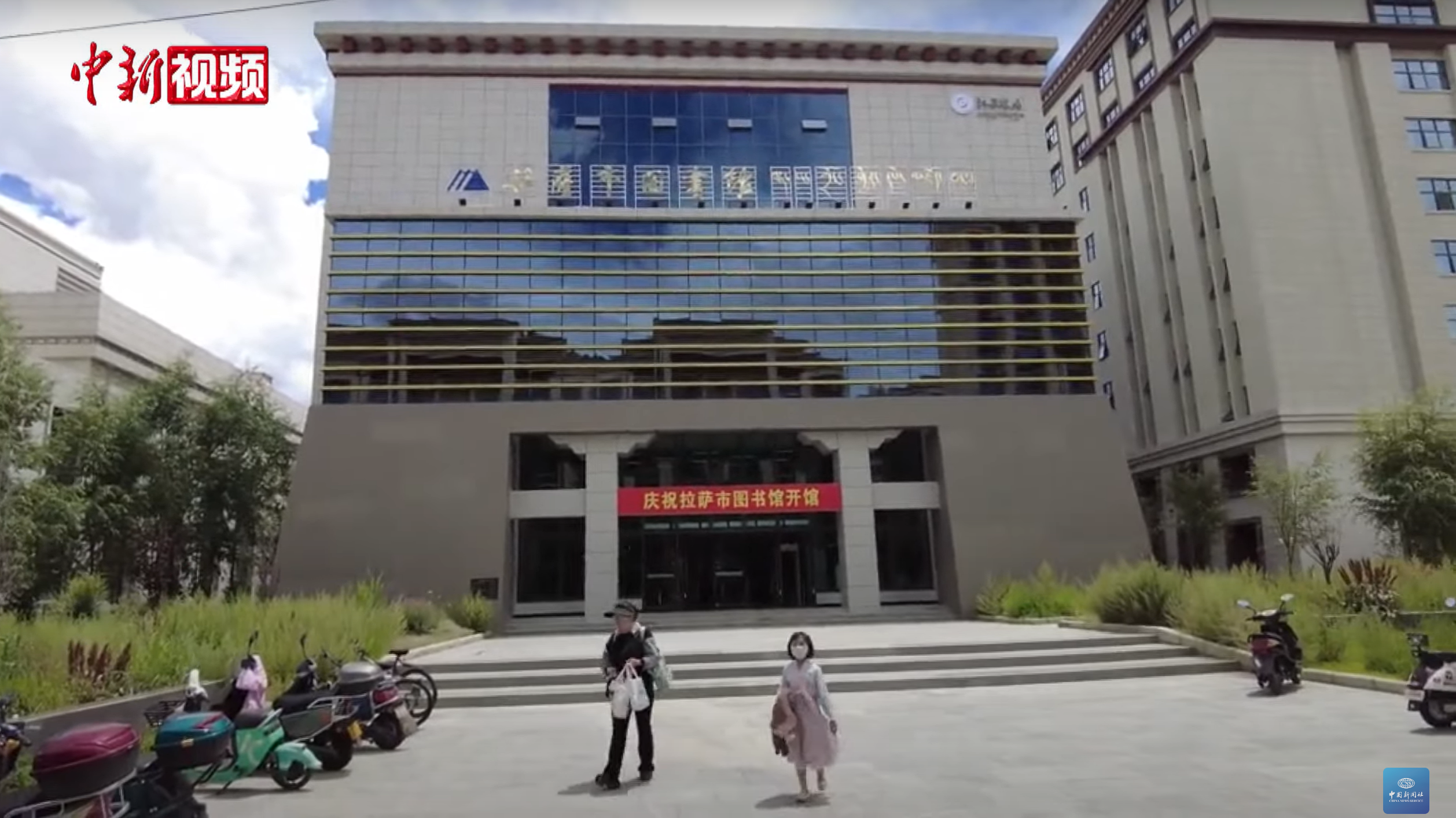
Lhasa Library in July 2023

Lhasa Library (Chinese: 拉萨市图书馆) is a public library located 100 meters east of Lhasa Municipal Archives in Chengguan District, Lhasa, Tibet Autonomous Region, China. Lhasa Library has six floors, with the first to fifth floors being free open area.

== History ==
The Lhasa Library started construction in May 2019 and completed final inspection in May 2023. The project has a total construction area of 7,754.22 square meters, with more than 2,000 reading seats. The library is equipped with a natural science thematic library, a social science thematic library, a young children's lending room, a children's lending room, a Chinese and foreign language book lending room, a Tibetan book lending room, and a local literature lending room. In 2023, the Lhasa Library also launched cultural activities such as "Library Night", "Enjoy Latour", "Personalized Reading" and "Namtso Cultural Tourism Experience Tour".

From April 22 to 28, 2024, the Lhasa Library of Tibet Autonomous Region held a series of publicity week activities with the theme of "Inheriting Culture and Reading the Epic of King Gesar". The Lhasa Municipal Library invited the national intangible cultural heritage inheritor to perform the Epic of King Gesar live rap.

== See also ==
- Tibet Library
