= List of libraries in China =

This is a list of libraries in the People's Republic of China. As of 2017, there were approximately 5,909 libraries in the country.

== Libraries by province or direct-administered municipality ==
=== Anhui ===
- Anhui Library (Chinese: 安徽省图书馆)
- Anhui University of Technology Library

=== Beijing ===
- Capital Library, Beijing
- Institute of West Asian and African Studies Library, Chinese Academy of Social Sciences
- Liyuan library, Yanqi
- Peking University Libraries
- Tsinghua University Library

=== Chongqing ===
- Chongqing Library (Chinese: 重庆市图书馆)
- Southwest University Library

=== Fujian ===
- Fujian Provincial Library (Chinese: 福建省图书馆)
- Library of Jinjiang City
- Xiamen University Libraries
- Xiguan Library, Fuzhou University

=== Gansu ===
- Gansu Library (Chinese: 甘肃省图书馆)
- Zhenyuan county library

=== Guangdong ===
- Dongguan library
- Guangzhou Library
- Jingtang Library
- Shenzhen Library
- Sun Yat-sen Memorial Library, Zhongshan
- Sun Yat-sen Library of Guangdong Province, Guangzhou (Chinese: 广东省图书馆)
- Zhongshan Library Xiamen Municipal Library Gulangyu Branch
- Zhuoying Library

=== Guangxi ===
- Library of Guangxi Zhuang Autonomous Region (Chinese: 广西壮族自治区图书馆)

=== Guizhou ===
- Guizhou Library (Chinese: 贵州省图书馆)

=== Hainan ===
- Hainan Library (Chinese: 海南省图书馆)
- Wormhole Library, Haikou

=== Hebei ===
- Hebei Library (Chinese: 河北省图书馆)
- Wenjin Ge, Chengde

=== Heilongjiang ===
- Heilongjiang Provincial Library (Chinese: 黑龙江省图书馆)

=== Henan ===
- Henan Library (Chinese: 河南图书馆)

=== Hubei ===
- Huazhong University of Science and Technology Library, Wuhan
- Hubei Provincial Library (Chinese: 湖北省图书馆)
- Wuhan Library
- Wuhan University Library

=== Hunan ===
- Hengyang Library
- Hunan Library (Chinese: 湖南省图书馆)

=== Inner Mongolia ===
- Library of Inner Mongolia Autonomous Region (Chinese: 内蒙古自治区图书馆)

=== Jiangsu ===
- Jinling Library
- Nanjing Library (Chinese: 南京圖書館)
- Nanjing University Library
- Suzhou Library

=== Jiangxi ===
- Jiangxi Library (Chinese: 江西省图书馆)

=== Jilin ===
- Jilin Library (Chinese: 吉林省图书馆)
- Yanbian Library

=== Liaoning ===
- Dalian Library
- Liaoning Library (Chinese: 辽宁省图书馆)
- Lingxi Library, Dalian University of Technology

=== Ningxia ===
- Library of Ningxia Hui Autonomous Region (Chinese: 宁夏回族自治区图书馆)

=== Qinghai ===
- Qinghai Library (Chinese: 青海省图书馆)

=== Shaanxi ===
- Shaanxi Library (Chinese: 陕西省图书馆)

=== Shandong ===
- Shandong Library (Chinese: 山东省图书馆)

=== Shanghai ===
See also: List of libraries in Shanghai (in Chinese)

- East China Normal University Library
- Shanghai Library (Chinese: 上海市图书馆)
- Shanghai Xujiahui Tu Shu Guan, est. 1847

=== Shanxi ===
- Qingxu County Library
- Shanxi Library (Chinese: 山西省图书馆)
- Xiaoyi County Library
- Yangcheng County Library
- Yangquan Prefecture Library
- Yuci County Library

=== Sichuan ===
- Chengdu Library
- Sichuan Provincial Library (Chinese: 四川省图书馆)
- Tianfu Humanities and Art Library

=== Tianjin ===
- Tianjin Binhai library
- Tianjin Library (Chinese: 天津市图书馆)

=== Tibet ===
- Tibet Autonomous Region Library (Chinese: 西藏自治区图书馆)

=== Xinjiang ===
- Library of Xinjiang Uygur Autonomous Region (Chinese: 新疆自治区图书馆)

=== Yunnan ===
- Yunnan Provincial Library (Chinese: 云南省图书馆)

=== Zhejiang ===
- Haining Library
- Hangzhou Children's Library
- Hangzhou Library
- Jiayetang, Huzhou
- Ningbo Library
- Ningbo University Zone Library
- Taizhou Library
- Tianyi Ge, Ningbo
- Wenlan Pavilion, Hangzhou
- Wenling Library
- Yuhuan Library
- Zhejiang Library (Chinese: 浙江省图书馆)
- Zhejiang University Library

== Special administrative regions ==
=== Macau ===
- Macao Public Library
  - Macao Central Library
  - Sir Robert Ho Tung Library

== See also ==
- Libraries in China
  - List of major provincial libraries in China
- List of library associations#China
- Archives in the People's Republic of China
- Chinese literature
- Intellectual property in China
- Mass media in China
