= Qinghai Provincial Library =

Public library in Xining, Qinghai, China

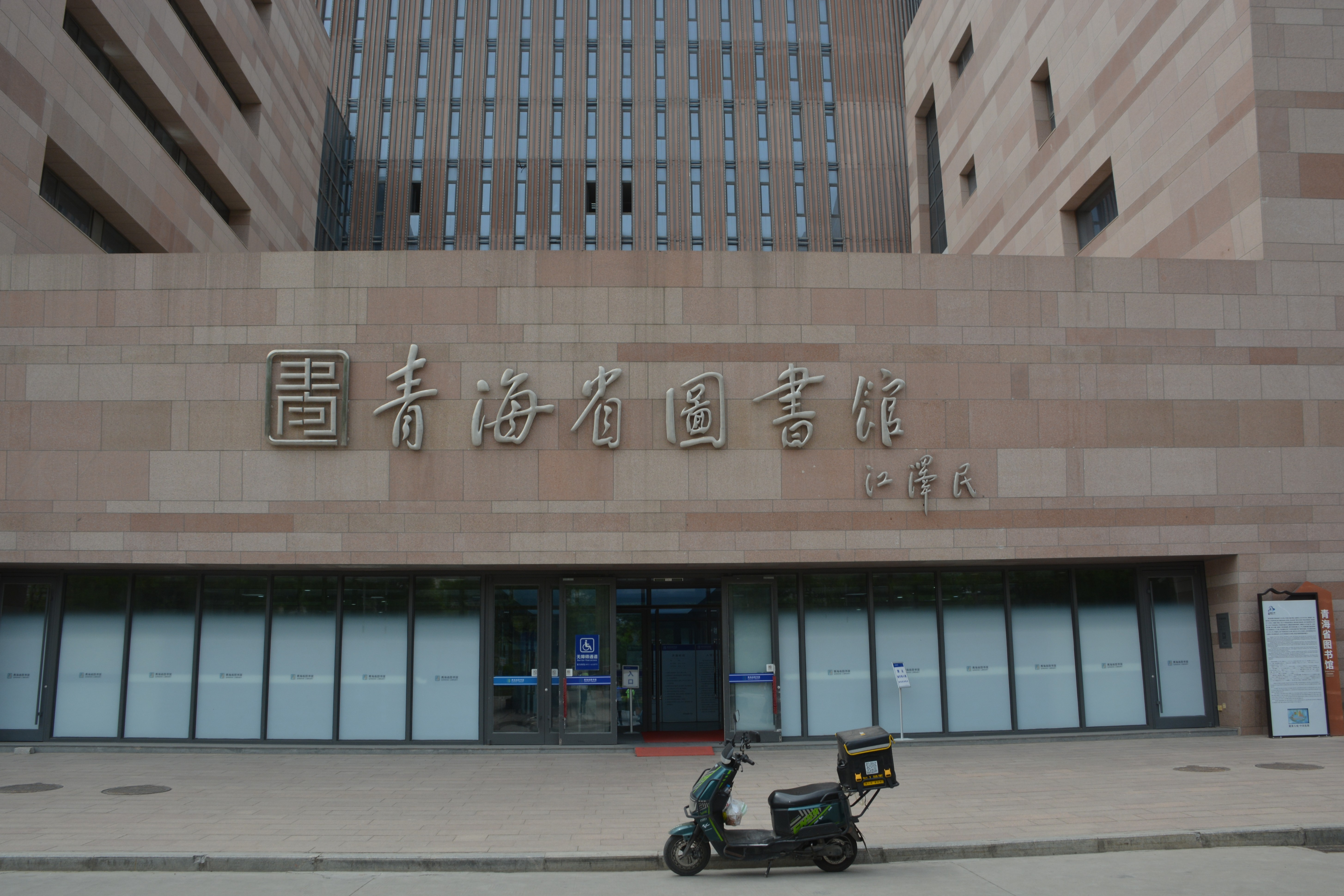
- Location: No. 66, Xiguan Street, Chengxi District, Xining City
- Type: Public library
- Established: 1934

Other information
- Website: qhslib.org.cn

The Qinghai Provincial Library (simplified Chinese: 青海省图书馆; traditional Chinese: 青海省圖書館), also known as the Qinghai Library, is a Xining-based large scale comprehensive public library, located at No. 66, Xiguan Street, Chengxi District, Xining City.

== History ==
The predecessor of the Qinghai Provincial Library was the Qinghai Province-established Library, which was built in 1934 and officially opened on 15 April 1935.

== See also ==
- List of libraries in China
