= Xiamen University Libraries =

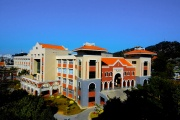
- Location: Xiamen, Fujian, China
- Established: 1921
- Branches: 5

Collection
- Size: n/a

Other information
- Employees: n/a
- Website: https://library.xmu.edu.cn/

Xiamen University Library was established in 1921. The famous librarian Qiu Kaiming served as the first director, Mr. Zheng Tianting was involved in the first book preparation, museologist Feng Hanji, literary scholar Lin Yutang, and the financier Zhu Baoxun all worked here.

The total building area of Xiamen University Library is about 103,000 square meters.

There are one main library, three branch libraries (Zhangzhou Campus, Zengcuo Aun Student Residence, Xiang'an Campus), three specialized branch libraries (Literature and History, Economics and Management, and Law), as well as seven colleges' libraries (Faculty of Architecture and Civil Engineering, Faculty of Foreign Languages and Literatures, Faculty of Chemistry and Chemical Engineering, Nanyang Research Institute, Taiwan Research Institute, and Graduate School of Education, etc.).

== History ==
After the 2001 and 2008 reconstruction, the total area extended to 26,000 square meters. Currently the library enjoys a collection of 3.5 million volumes, covering subjects such as the biology, chemistry, economics, history, management, mathematics, medicine, oceanography, philosophy, physics, Southeast Asia, and Taiwan studies, among others.

== Facilities ==
Xiamen University Libraries consists of a general library and 5 branch libraries. The departments include the Administration, Acquisition, Cataloging, Conservation & Preservation, Circulation, Reference, Periodicals, and Information Technology Department. Various services are available to all campus users, which include lending, reading, reference, consultation, research project review, inter-library loan, self-service photocopying, and so on. Currently there are over 20 study rooms and more than 4,000 seats available to the readers in the libraries. In 1993, computerized circulation system was adopted in the main library. In 1994, An integrated management system was set up and been upgraded in 1999 and 2007 respectively. Digital library project initiated since 2000, with an aim to provide a growingly richer resource onto the internet.

The past decade has witnessed the radical restructuring of public service system in the libraries. In 1998, two branch libraries, namely the Economic and Management Branch Library and the Law Branch Library were established. The later half of 1999 witnessed the set-up of Biological and Medical Branch Library. Then, a university wise framework of collection and information sharing was launched among the libraries in different colleges, institutes and departments. In September 2001, Eastern Campus Branch Library was set up in Zengcuo'an dormitory zone. Later in August 2003, students in the Zhangzhou Campus had their own library——the Zhangzhou Campus Library, which boasted of exquisite facilities and rich collection.

With time, the Xiamen University Libraries will increasingly become an institute for wisdom and self-fulfillment.

== Photo gallery ==
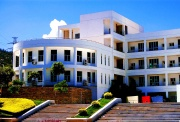
Eastern Campus Branch Library

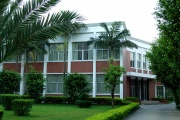
Economic and Management Branch Library

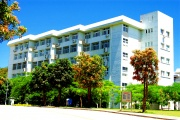
Law Branch Library

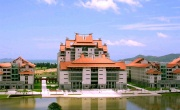
Zhangzhou Campus Library

== See also ==
- List of libraries in China
