= Guizhou Provincial Library =

Library in Guiyang, China

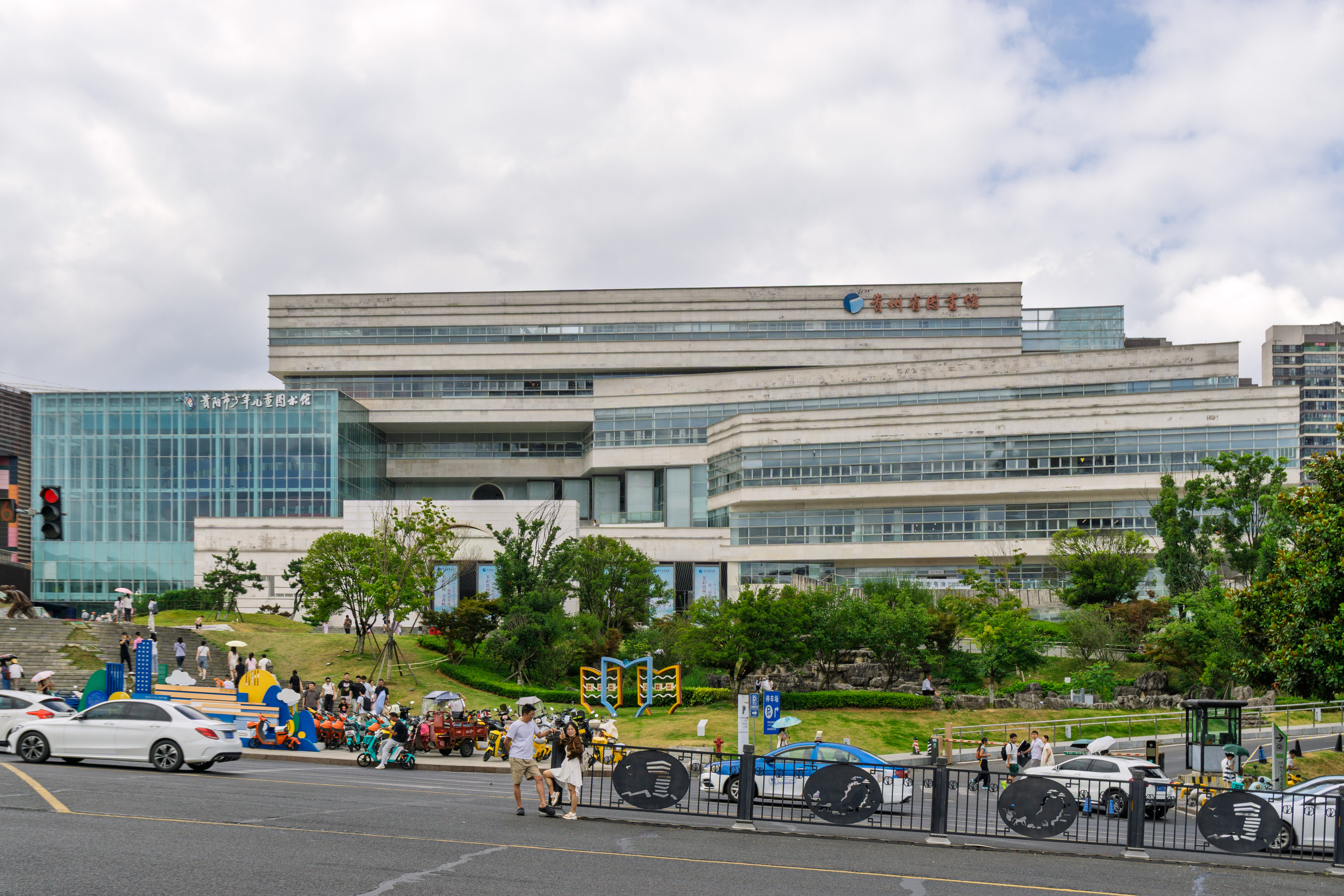
- Location: 130 Beijing Road, Guiyang, Guizhou
- Type: Public library
- Established: May 1937

Other information
- Website: www.gzlib.com.cn

The Guizhou Provincial Library (simplified Chinese: 贵州省图书馆; traditional Chinese: 貴州省圖書館), also known as the Guizhou Library, is a Guiyang-based comprehensive provincial-level public library, located on Beijing Road in Guiyang City, Guizhou Province.

== History ==
The predecessor of the Guizhou Provincial Library was the Guizhou Province-established Library, which was founded in May 1937.

On 31 December 2020, the Guizhou Provincial Library (North Hall) opened for trial operation, which is the New Hall of Guizhou Provincial Library.

== See also ==
- List of libraries in China
