= Xinjiang Library =

Public library in Urumqi, China

- 自治区图书馆
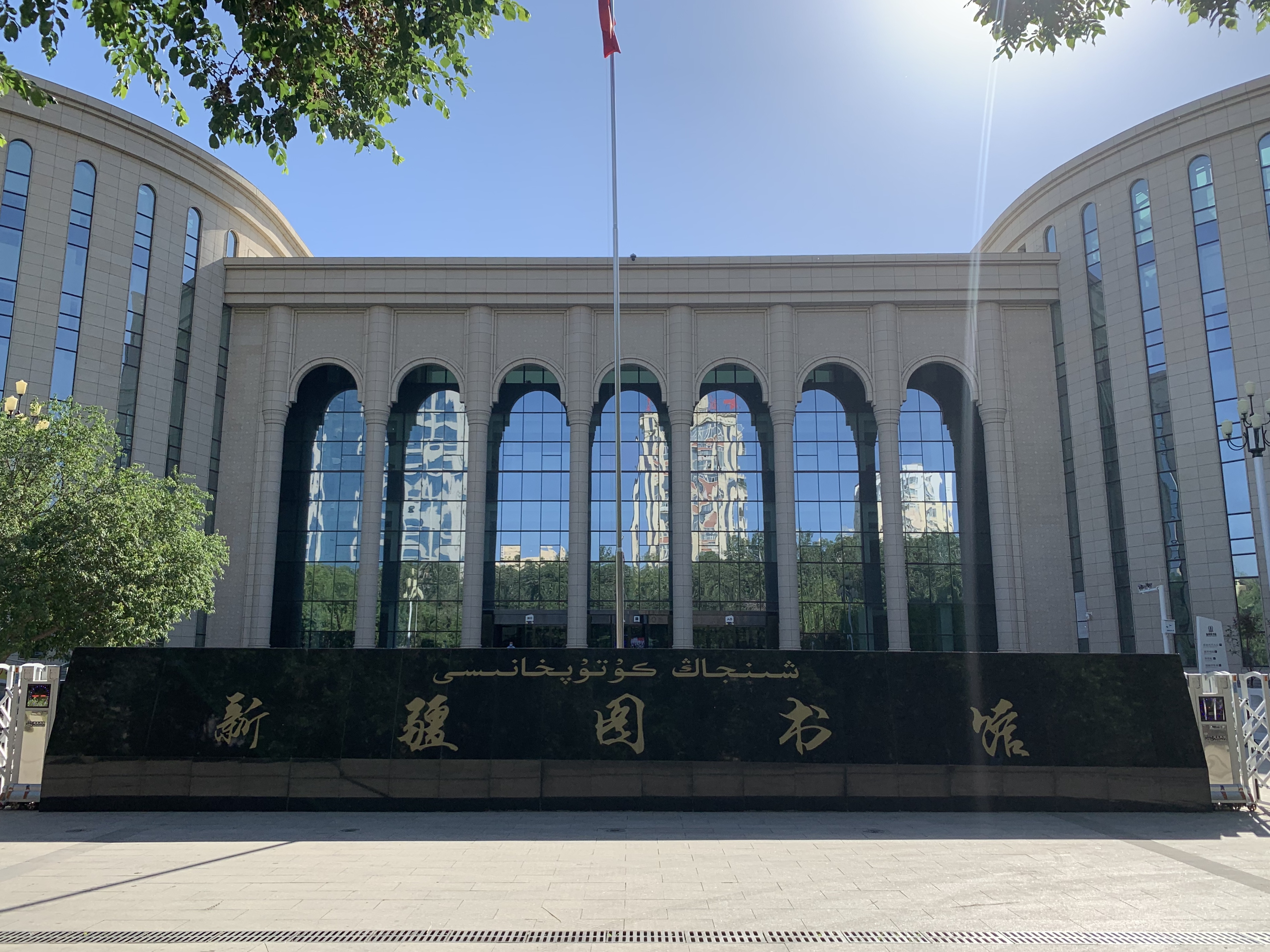
- 43.84634841810761°N 87.57604909788796°E
- Location: Beijing Road, Ürümqi, China
- Type: Public library
- Established: August 1930

Other information
- Website: https://www.xjlib.org/

The Xinjiang Library (simplified Chinese: 新疆图书馆; traditional Chinese: 新疆圖書館), also known as the Library of Xinjiang Uygur Autonomous Region, is an autonomous region-level public library of the Xinjiang Uygur Autonomous Region of the People's Republic of China, located on Beijing Road in Urumqi.

== History ==
Xinjiang Library was founded in August 1930 as the Xinjiang Provincial Library and renamed as the People's Library of Xinjiang Province in December 1949, which was renamed as the Library of Xinjiang Uygur Autonomous Region when the Xinjiang Uygur Autonomous Region was established in October 1955.

By the end of 1999, Xinjiang Library had a total of 1.14 million volumes in its collection.

== See also ==
- List of libraries in China
