= Inner Mongolia Library =

Public library of Inner Mongolia, Chna

- Location: Hohhot
- Type: Public library
- Established: 1908

Other information
- Website: www.nmglib.com

The Inner Mongolia Library (simplified Chinese: 内蒙古图书馆; traditional Chinese: 內蒙古圖書館), or Neimenggu Library, also known as the Library of Inner Mongolia Autonomous Region, is a large scale comprehensive public library of the Inner Mongolia Autonomous Region of the People's Republic of China, located in Hohhot.

== History ==
Inner Mongolia Library is the earliest public library in Inner Mongolia Autonomous Region, which was founded in 1908 as the Guihua City Library and renamed as Suiyuan Provincial Library in 1925. In 1954, the name was changed to Inner Mongolia Library.

In 2012, Inner Mongolia Library implemented the digital culture into the yurt project. In 2014, the library introduced the Cloud Service Project.

== See also ==
- List of libraries in China
