= Wuhan University Library =

Library in Wuhan, China

- 武汉大学图书馆
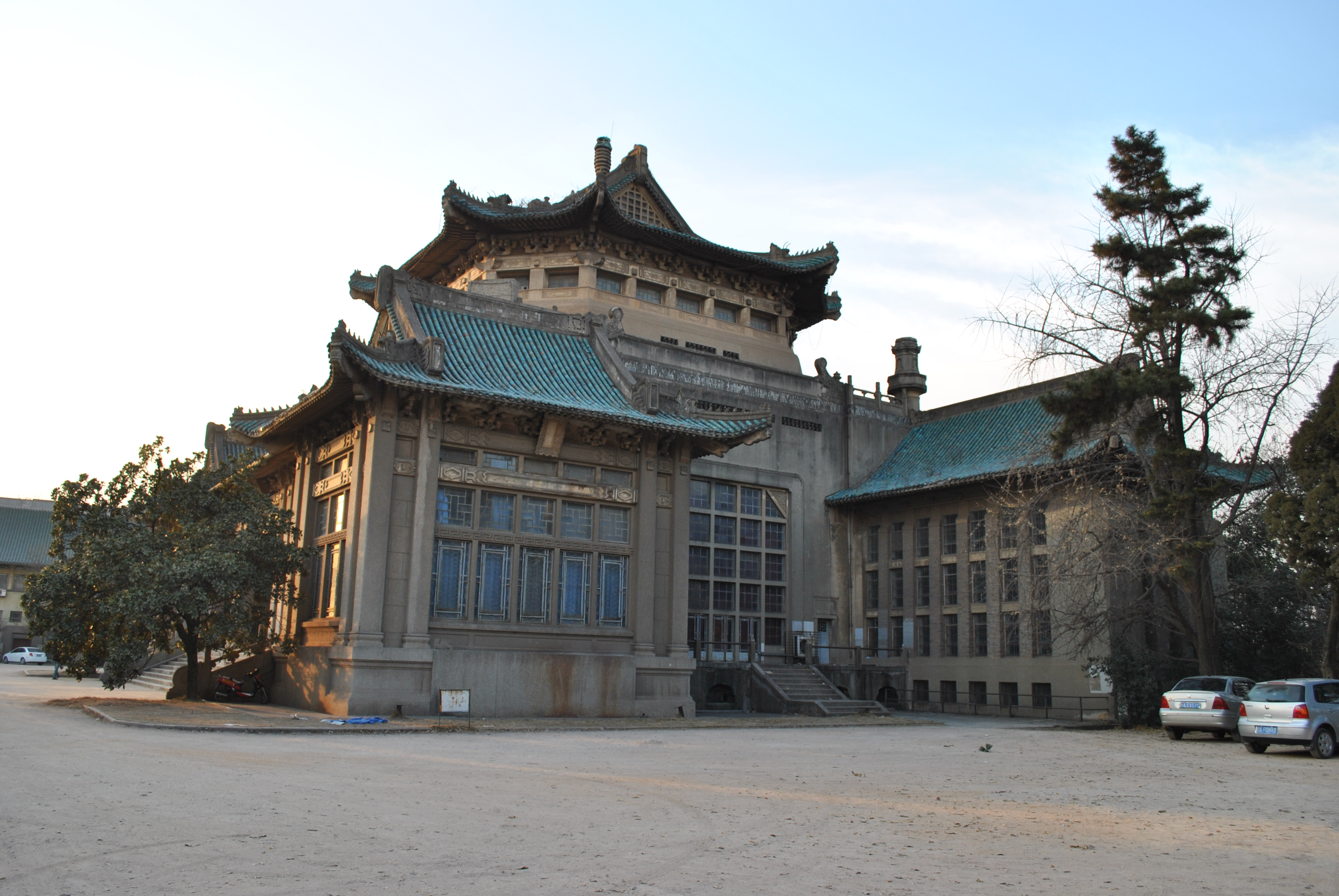
- The old library building
- 30.535937799096985°N 114.36252694770953°E
- Location: Wuhan, Hubei, China
- Established: 1917
- Branches: 4

Collection
- Size: 13,360,000 volumes (2010)

Access and use
- Access requirements: depends on library

Other information
- Website: en.lib.whu.edu.cn

Wuhan University Library (Chinese: 武汉大学图书馆) is the library system of Wuhan University, serving the university's students and faculty. It has four branches: the Arts and Sciences, Engineering, Information Technology, and Medical Libraries. The collection contains approximately 228,000 books & periodicals, 5,778 newspapers, 6,767,000 printing volumes, 6,590,000 e-books & e-magazines, 442 databases and 200,000 volumes of thread-bound ancient books as of 2011.

== History ==
The predecessor of the Wuhan University Library was the Zi Qiang School founded by Zhang Zhidong. In 1913, the National Wuchang Higher Normal College was founded, containing a small library. The library first appears in formal documents in 1917. In 1927, the library changed its name to the National Wuhan University Library. At first there was only one book cataloger, about 3000 foreign language books, and a small number of Chinese books. In 1936 the collection grew to about 140,000 books. From 1928 to 1936, Yang Mingzhi, Pi Zongshi and Yang Duanliu successively served as its director. The old library building on the top of Mount Shizi was built in 1935.

During the second Sino-Japanese War, the library moved to Leshan, Sichuan. During the bombing in Leshan on August 19, 1939, and the plundering of books by the Japanese on March 4, 1940, many volumes were lost, and the library collection dropped to less than 100,000 volumes. It then served as an institution to preserve books, and did not allow people to borrow them. When the library returned to Luojia Hill after the war, the collection grew to 154,455 volumes.

After the war, the library having received a large donation amount from the United Kingdom and the United States, the foreign language resources increased. In 1947, some left-wing students formed a new library called June 1 Library (六一图书馆), the collections of which were merged into the University Library after 1949. In 2000, Wuhan University Library and its surrounding buildings were listed in the Fifth Major Historical and Cultural Site Protected at the National Level batch.

Wuhan University Library values its geomatic book collections as its basic development orientation and maintains the most integrated geomatics global periodicals, foreign meeting proceedings, numerous scale relief maps and distant sensing picture photographs. The library is known especially for the foreign periodical collection, in which it has over 2700 global periodical headings, covering the earliest volumes of German technical journal Zeitschrift für Vermessungswesen, complete from the initial volume in 1873 to the present.

== Wuhan University Library controversy ==
In July 2023, Wuhan University student Yang Jingyuan (杨景媛) (not to be confused with the translator Yang Jingyuan (杨静远, 1923-2015)) accused a male student surnamed Xiao of sexually harassing her in Wuhan University Library. On 11 October 2023, Yang published details of the incident online, attracting widespread public attention. Two days later, Wuhan University announced that Xiao had received a disciplinary demerit.

In June 2024, Yang filed a civil lawsuit against Xiao, seeking a public apology and compensation of 5,000 yuan. On 25 July 2025, the Wuhan Economic and Technological Development Zone People's Court dismissed all of Yang's claims.

On 28 July 2025, Hong Kong Baptist Universtiy, responding to media reports concerning the case, stated that it had clear admissions policies and a code of conduct, that any university member found to have violated the code would be dealt with under established disciplinary procedures, and that the university would not comment on individual cases.

Yang subsequently appealed the judgment. On 17 September 2025, the Wuhan Intermediate People's Court dismissed the appeal and upheld the first-instance judgment.

On 20 September 2025, Wuhan University issued a statement announcing that, after considering the judicial rulings and conducting an internal review, it had decided to revoke the disciplinary demerit previously imposed on Xiao.

The case subsequently attracted widespread public attention and discussion in China.

== See also ==
- List of libraries in China
