= Henan Provincial Library =

Public library in Zhengzhou, China

- 河南省图书馆
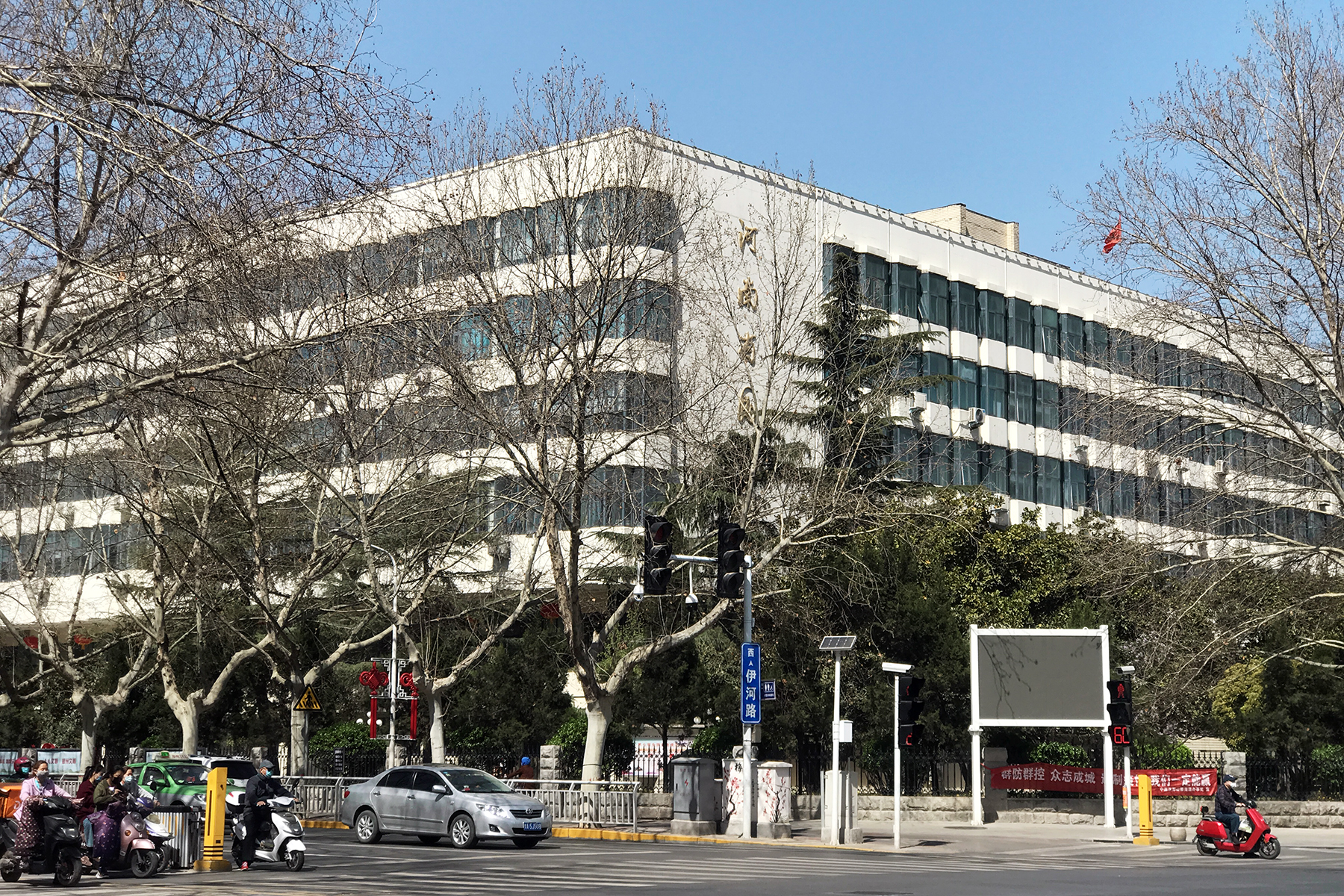
- 34.74353622060784°N 113.62768942264672°E
- Location: 76 Songshan S Road, Zhengzhou, Henan Province, China
- Type: Public library
- Established: 1909

Other information
- Website: www.henanlib.com

The Henan Provincial Library (simplified Chinese: 河南省图书馆; traditional Chinese: 河南省圖書館), also known as the Henan Library, is a Zhengzhou-based provincial-level public library, located at 150 South Songshan Road, Zhengzhou City, Henan Province. It is the largest public library in Henan, with a total cumulative collection of 3.1 million books (pieces).

Henan Provincial Library was officially opened to the public in February 1909 and is one of the earlier provincial public libraries in China.

== History ==
Henan Provincial Library was officially opened in a family Ancestral Hall in Kaifeng on the eighth day of February in the lunar calendar of the first year of the Xuantong (i.e. 27 February 1909 AD).

== See also ==
- List of libraries in China
