= Tsinghua University Library =

Library of Tsinghua University in Beijing, China

- 清华大学图书馆
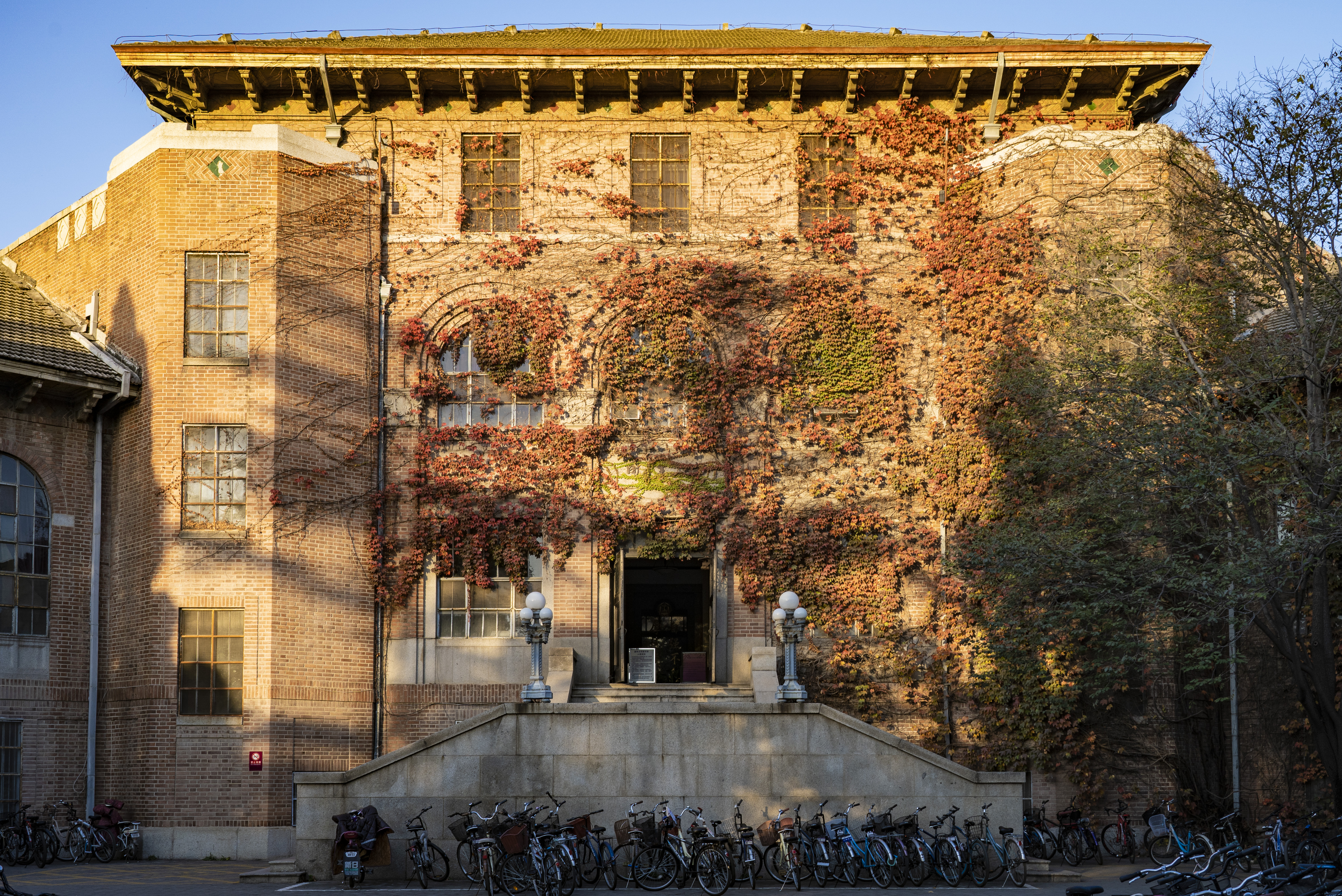
- Old Library of Tsinghua University
- 40°00′17″N 116°19′28″E
- Location: Tsinghua University, Beijing, China
- Type: Public
- Established: 1916; 110 years ago

Collection
- Items collected: 5.97 million volumes (2024)

Other information
- Website: lib.tsinghua.edu.cn

Chinese name
- Simplified Chinese: 清华大学图书馆
- Traditional Chinese: 清華大學圖書館
Transcriptions
Standard Mandarin
- Hanyu Pinyin: Qīnghuá Dàxué Túshūguǎn

Tsinghua University Library is the academic library system of Tsinghua University in Haidian, Beijing, China.

It consists of the Main Library and six branch libraries: Humanities & Social Sciences Library, Economics & Management Library, Law Library, Architecture Library, Fine Arts Library, and Finance Library. The Main Library, with a total construction area of 42,820 square meters, consists of the Old Library, West Library (Yifu Library) and North Library (Mochtar Riady Library). The West and North Libraries are integrated harmoniously in style with the Old Library.

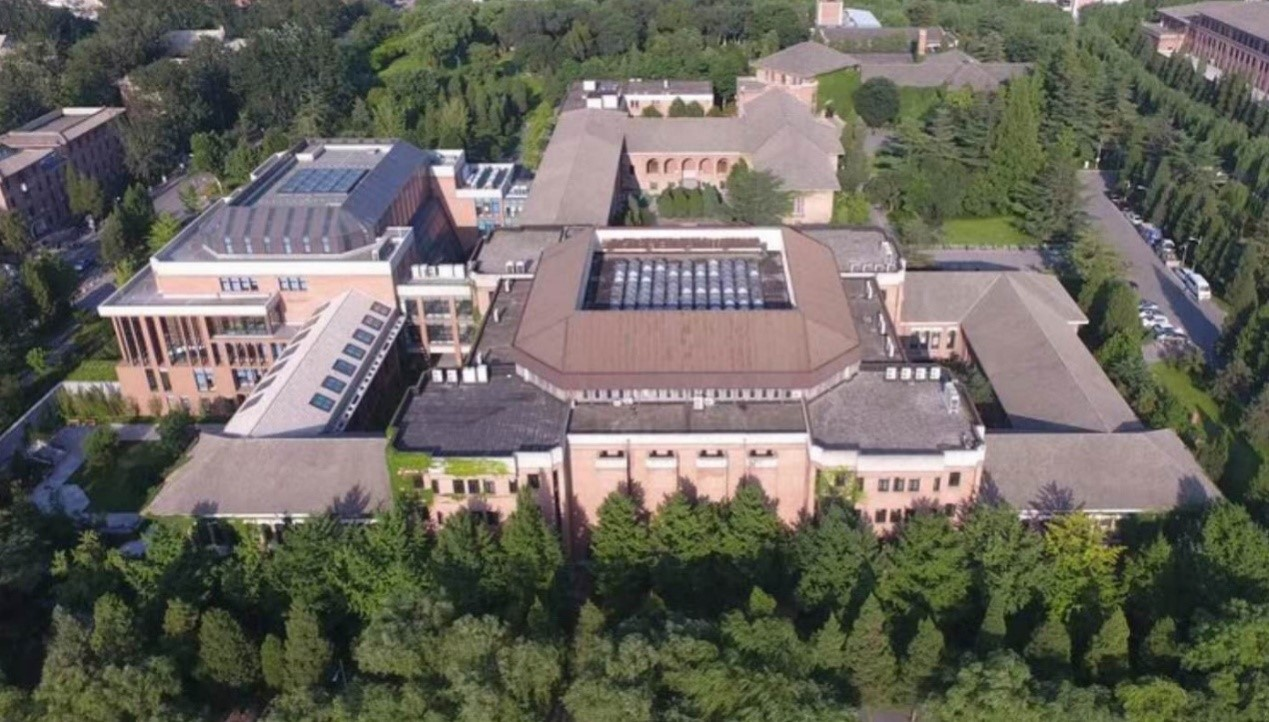
Aerial view of the Main Library buildings

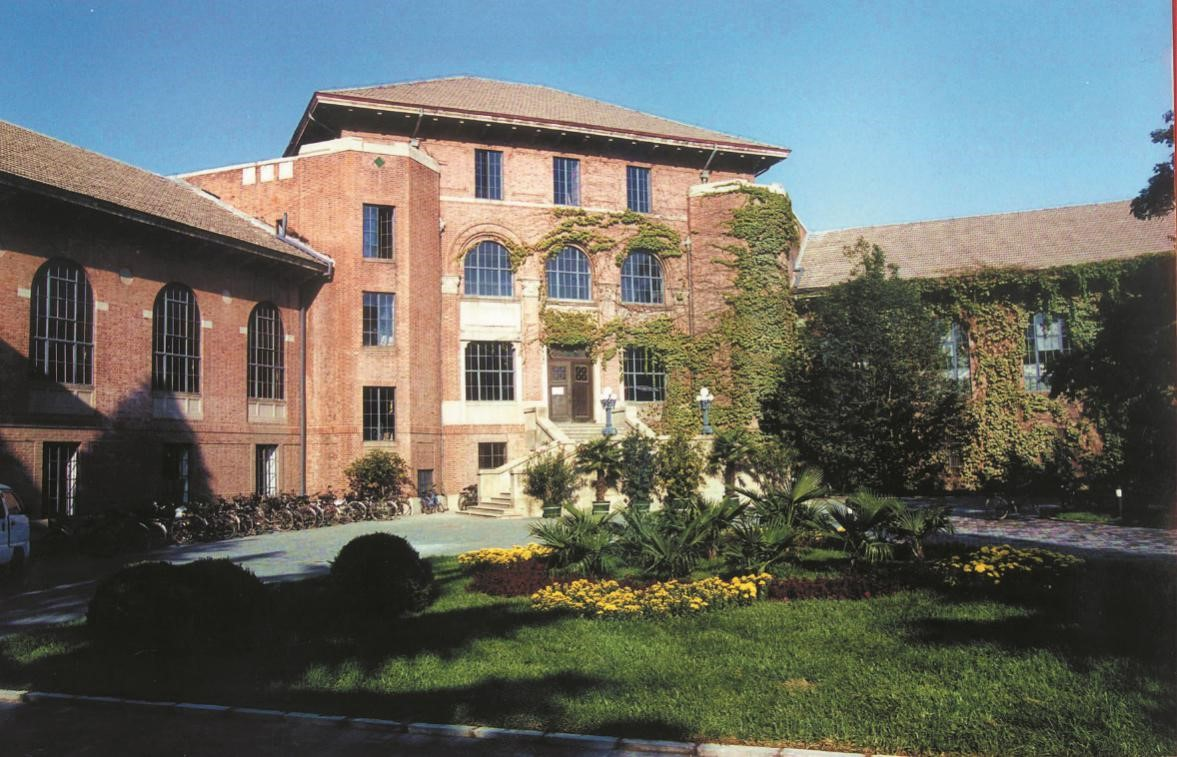
View of the Old Library

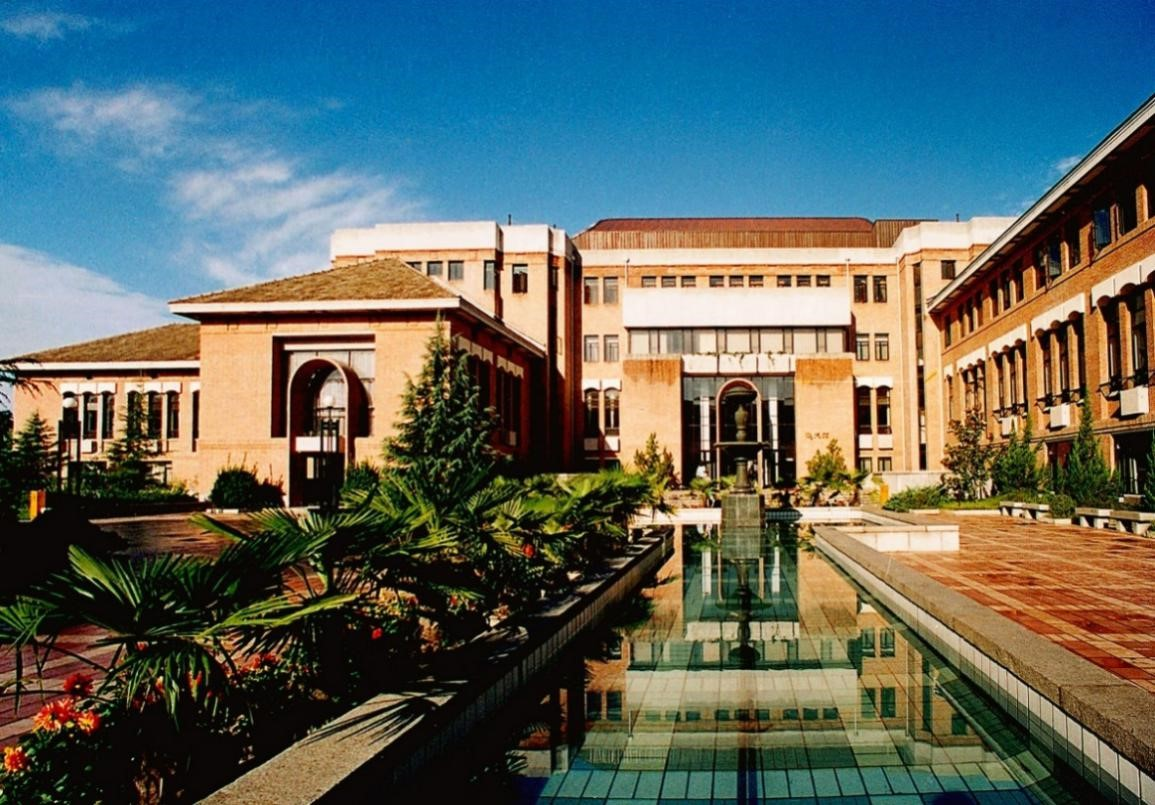
The West Library and bronze fountain

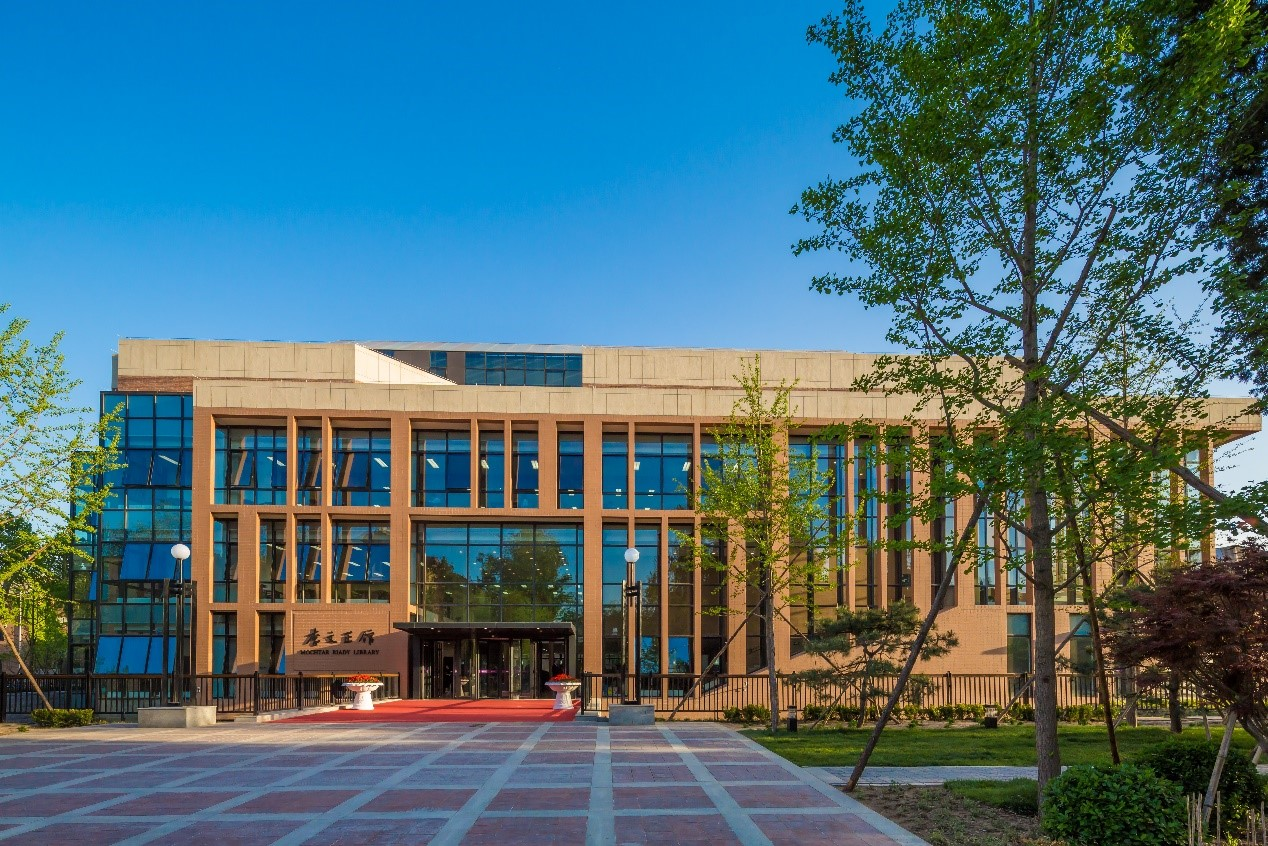
The North Library

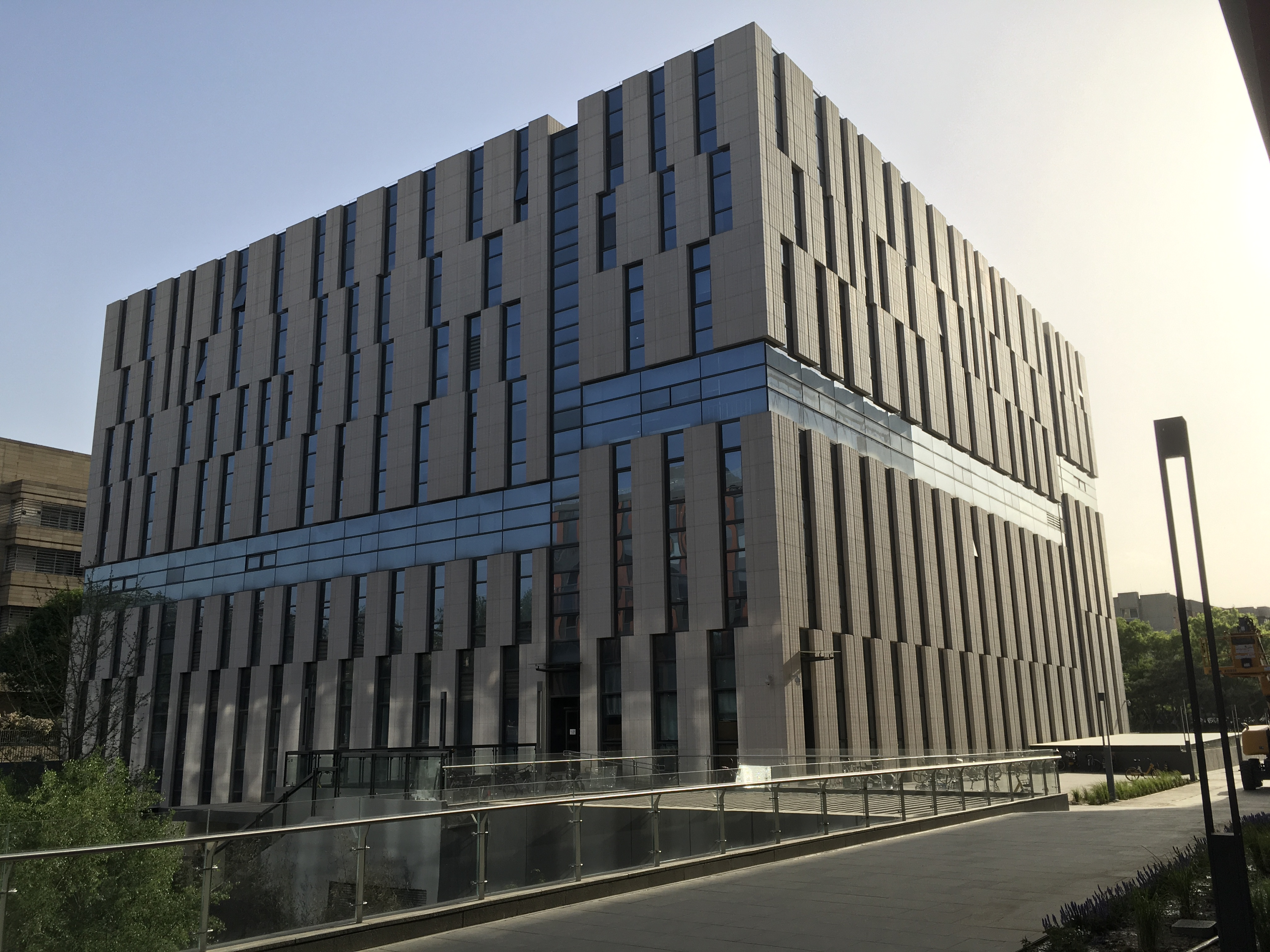
The Law Library at the Tsinghua University

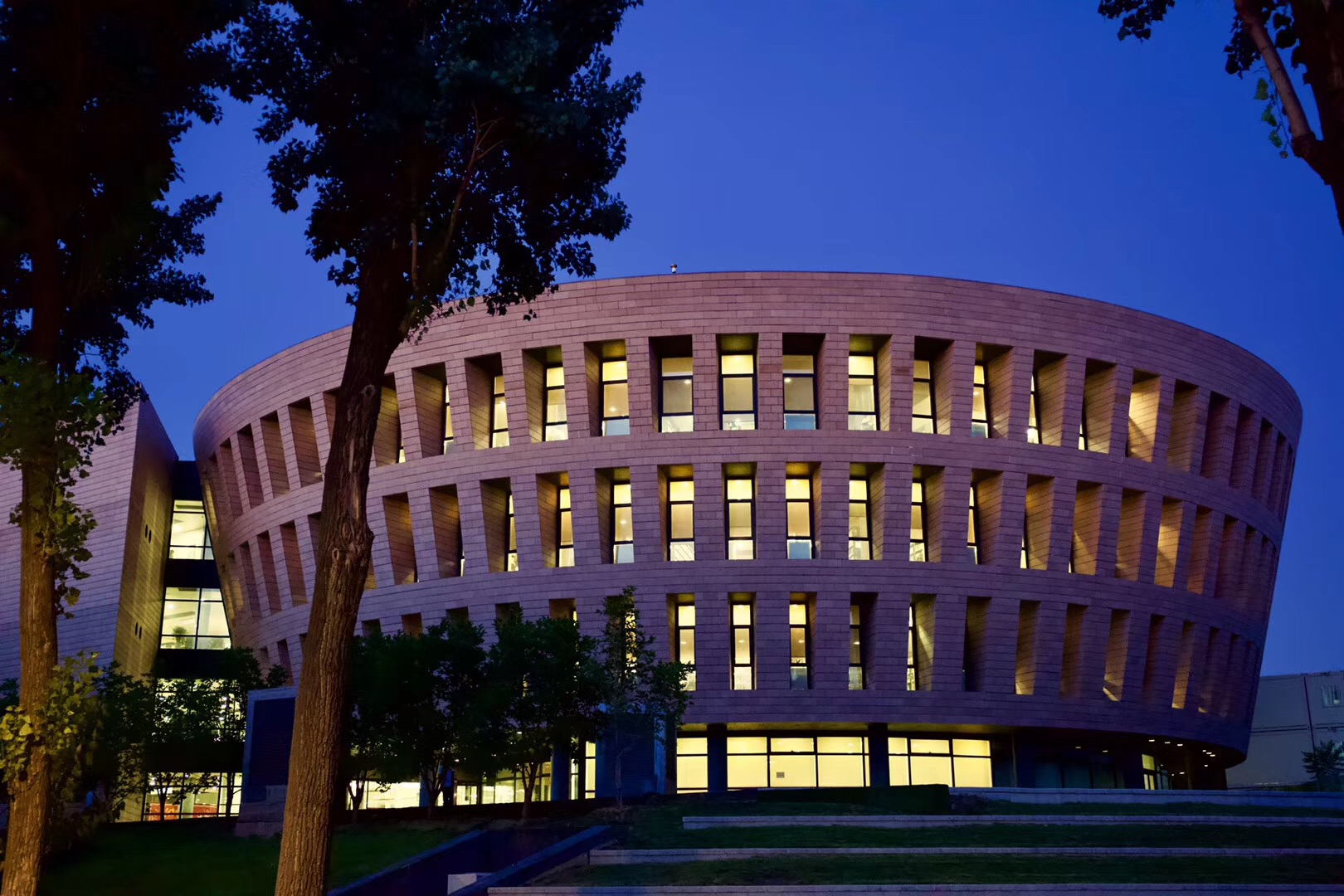
A branch library for Humanities & Social Sciences

== See also ==
- List of libraries in China
