= Jingtang Library =

Library in Huicheng District, Guangdong, China

- 景堂图书馆
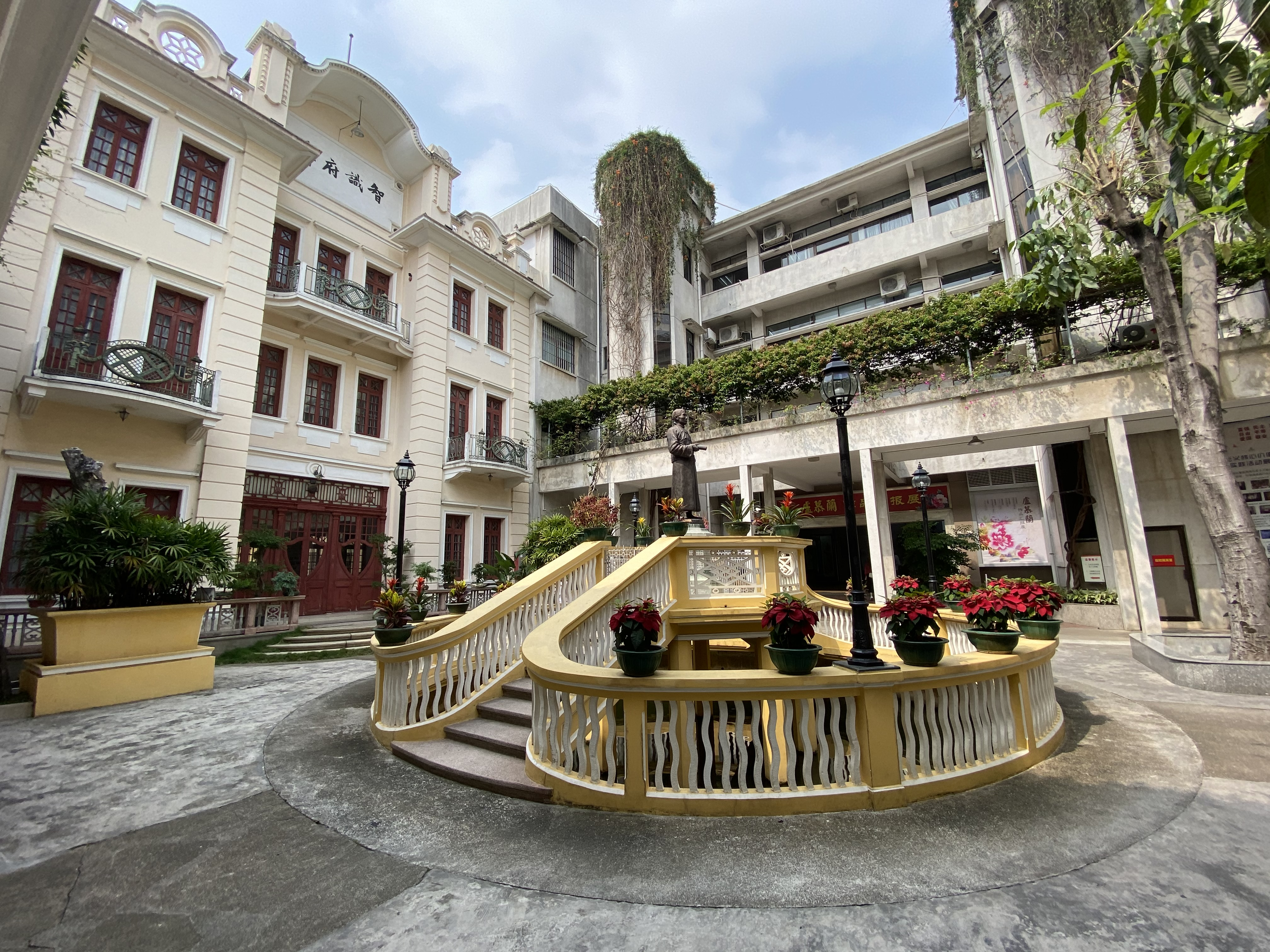
- Garden of Jingtang Library in 2021
- 22.520979181068878°N 113.0400562360468°E
- Location: 16 Renshou Rd, Huicheng neighbourhood, Xinhui district, Jiangmen, Guangdong, China
- Established: 1925

Collection
- Items collected: More than 400,000 books
- Size: 6,510 square meters

Other information
- Director: Meimei Yuan
- Website: Jingtang Library

The Jingtang Library (Chinese: 景堂圖書館) is a library located in the city of Jiangmen in Guangdong, China. The library was established in 1925, by an Overseas Chinese founder Fung Ping Shan. The area of the library was initially 1,250 m^{2}, and after a series of donations from Fung Ping-fan, the son of Fung Ping Shan, the library was expanded by 4,030 m^{2}, and the new building of the library was built in 1988. In 2012, Huo Zongjie (霍宗傑) donated to build an extra reading room, named the "Huo Zongjie Reading Room". In the present day, the total area of the library reaches 6,510 m^{2} (70073.05 ft²) nowadays. More than 400,000 books are collected in the library.

== Facilities ==
The library offers the following resources:

- Digital Reading Room (電子閱覽室)
- Newspapers and Periodicals Reading Room (報刊閱覽室)
- Braille Material Service Room (視障人士閱覽室)
- "Love-Tree" Story Room (愛心樹故事屋)
- Exhibition Hall (展覽廳)
- Book Check-in/Check-out Room (圖書借閱室)
- Diversity Reading Room (綜合閱覽室)
- Children's Book Check-in/Check-out Room (少兒閱覽室) - late moved to the north wing in 2024
- Special Collection Reading Room (特藏閱覽室)
- Class Room (教室)
- Study Room (自修室)
- Xinhui Public Forum (新會大眾講堂)
- Multi-function Hall (多功能報告廳)
- Fok Chung-Kit (Huo Zongjie) Reading Room (霍宗傑閱覽室)
- Multicultral reading centre - established 2022 in Kong Yoo Mansion, west of the library (心连心多元文化园)

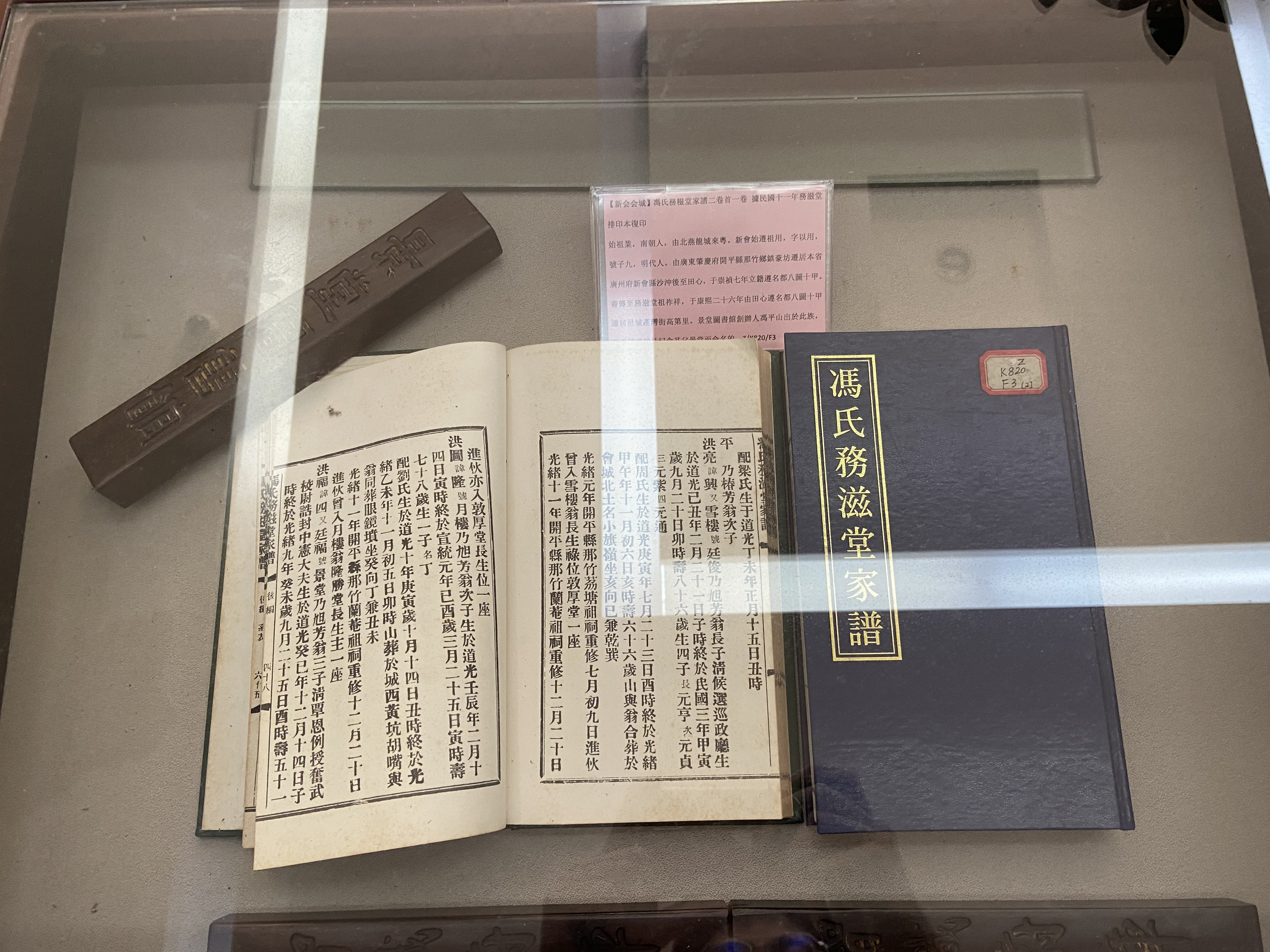
Genealogy Book of Fung (Feng) in Jingtang Library

== Collections ==
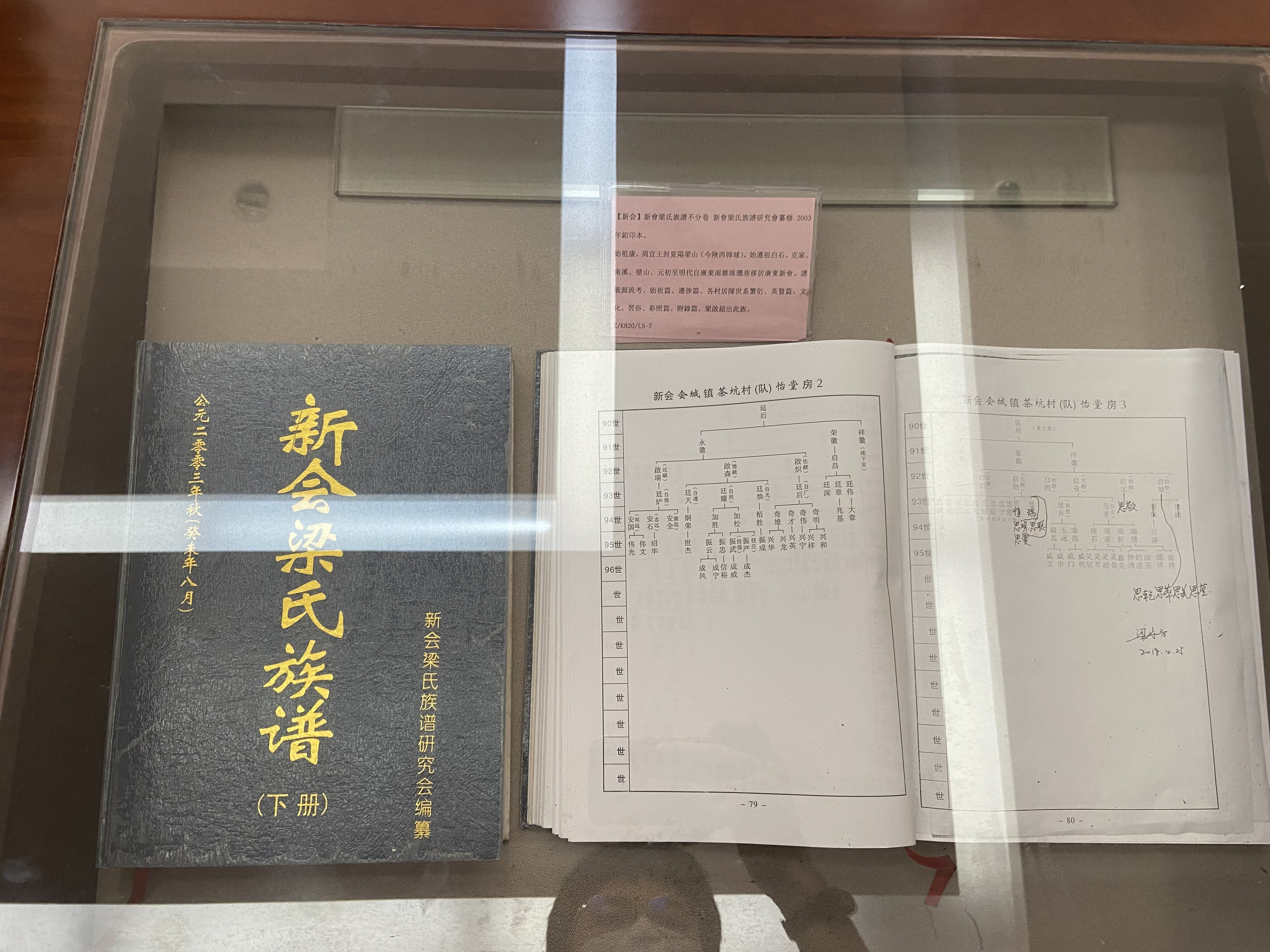
Genealogy Book of Leung (Liang) in Jingtang Library

There are a substantial number of collections in the library, including Local history, documents of the history of Overseas Chinese, genealogy books, etc. For instance, the library is keeping Wan Guo Shi Ji (萬國史記, The Record of World History, Hua Guotang, 1900), and Da Xue Yan Yi Tong Lve (大學衍義通略, the 43rd year of the Jiajing Emperor in the Ming dynasty). Most of the old books were collected from communities and families. In the 1950s, Xinhui District organized a collection activity to search for old books from communities and families, to register and preserve those collections in the library. There are also collections like resources of Overseas Chinese including 20 types of papers dating back to the time before the establishment of the People's Republic of China. For example, the library has Siyi Newspaper (四邑平報, 1917) and Gangzhou Weekly News (岡州星期報, 1925), which recorded the history of Xinhui District like Sun Ning Railway. Alternatively, there are collections dating back to nearly 900 years ago when Song dynasty was migrating to the south. For instance, the library has kept some Guqin music sheet like Gu Gang Zhe Hu Music Sheet (古崗蔗胡琴譜). The library also collects more than 910 genealogy books for up to 68 family names.

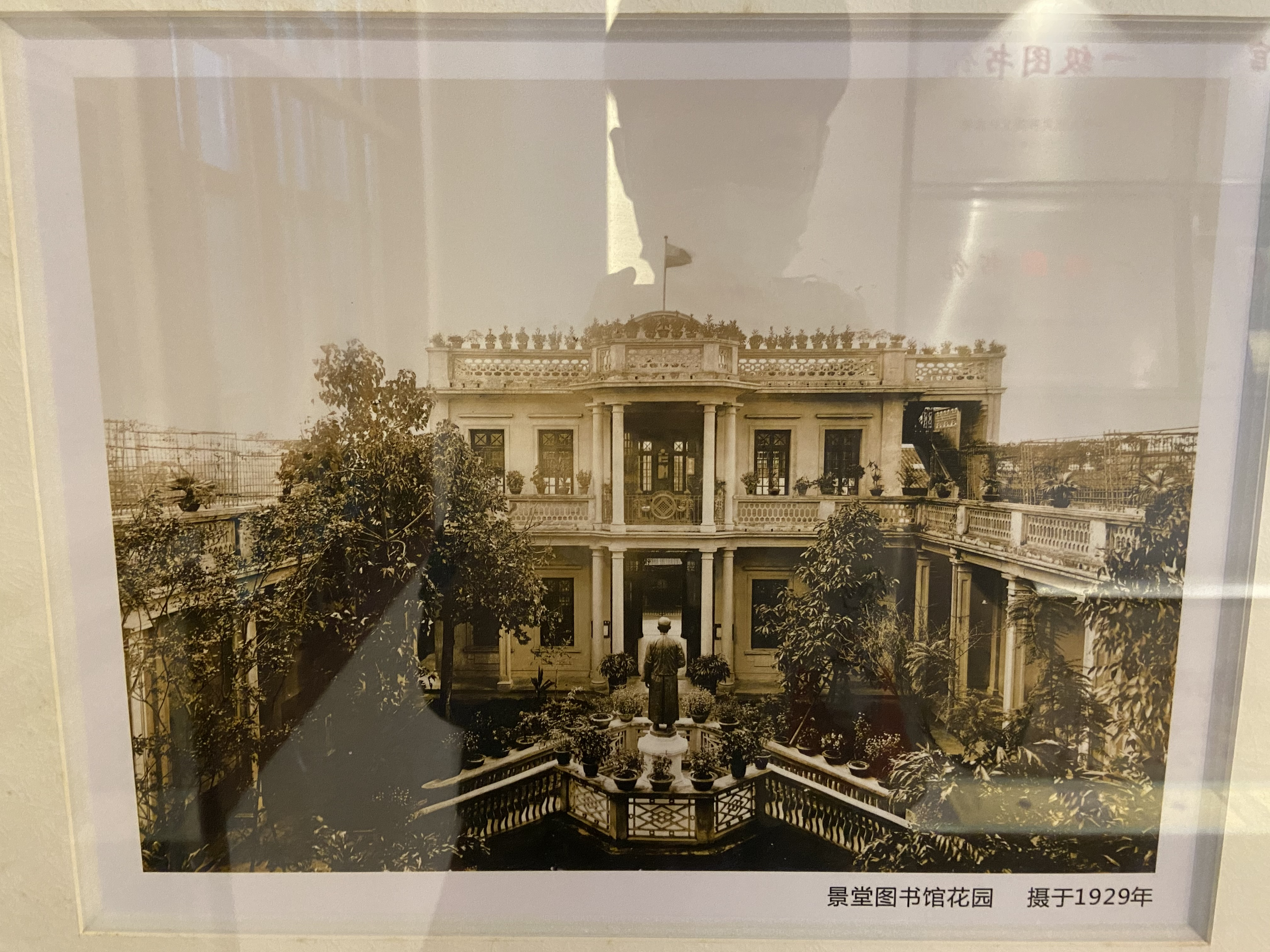
Garden of Jiangtang Library in 1929

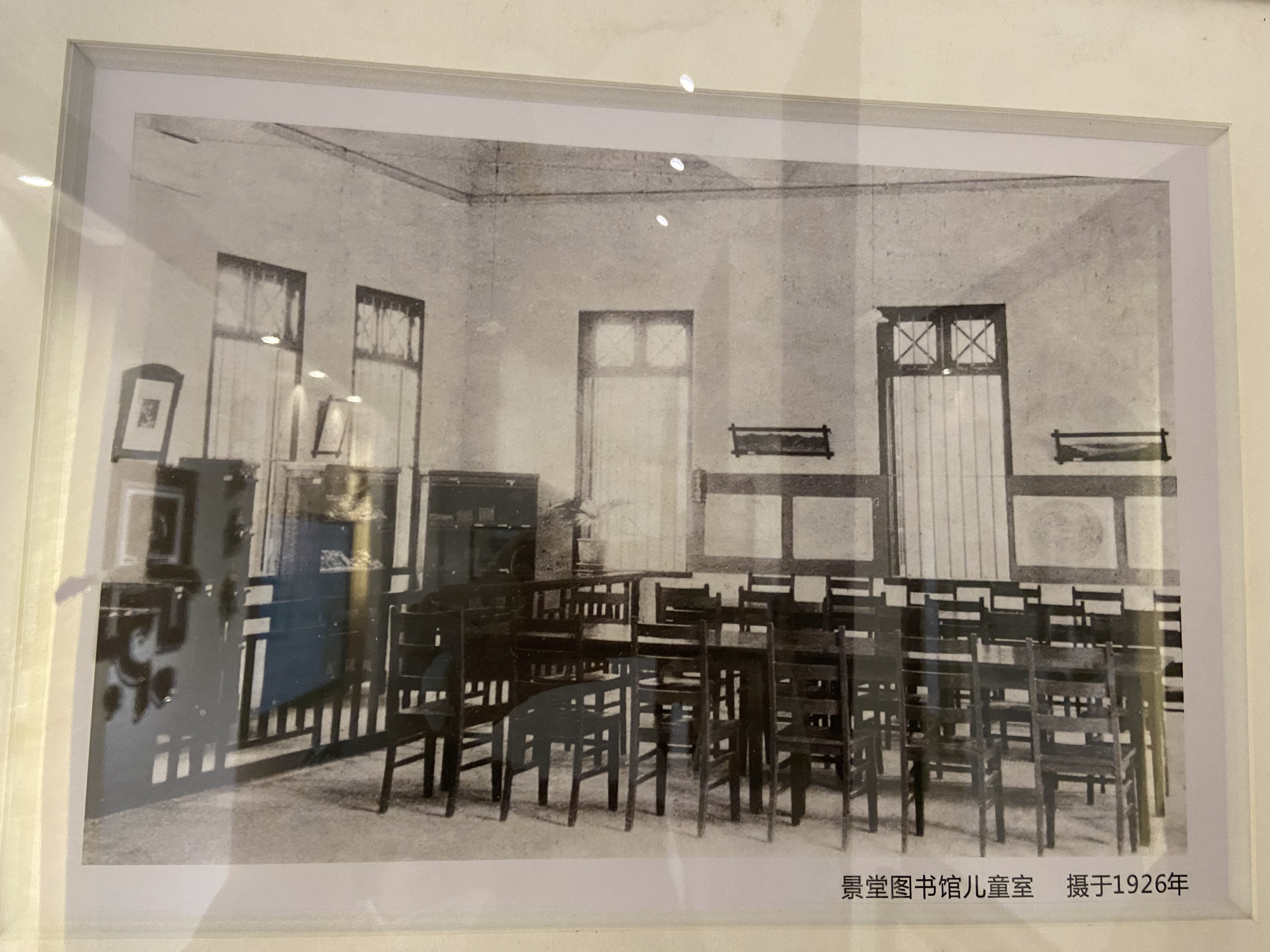
Children's Room of Jingtang Library in 1926

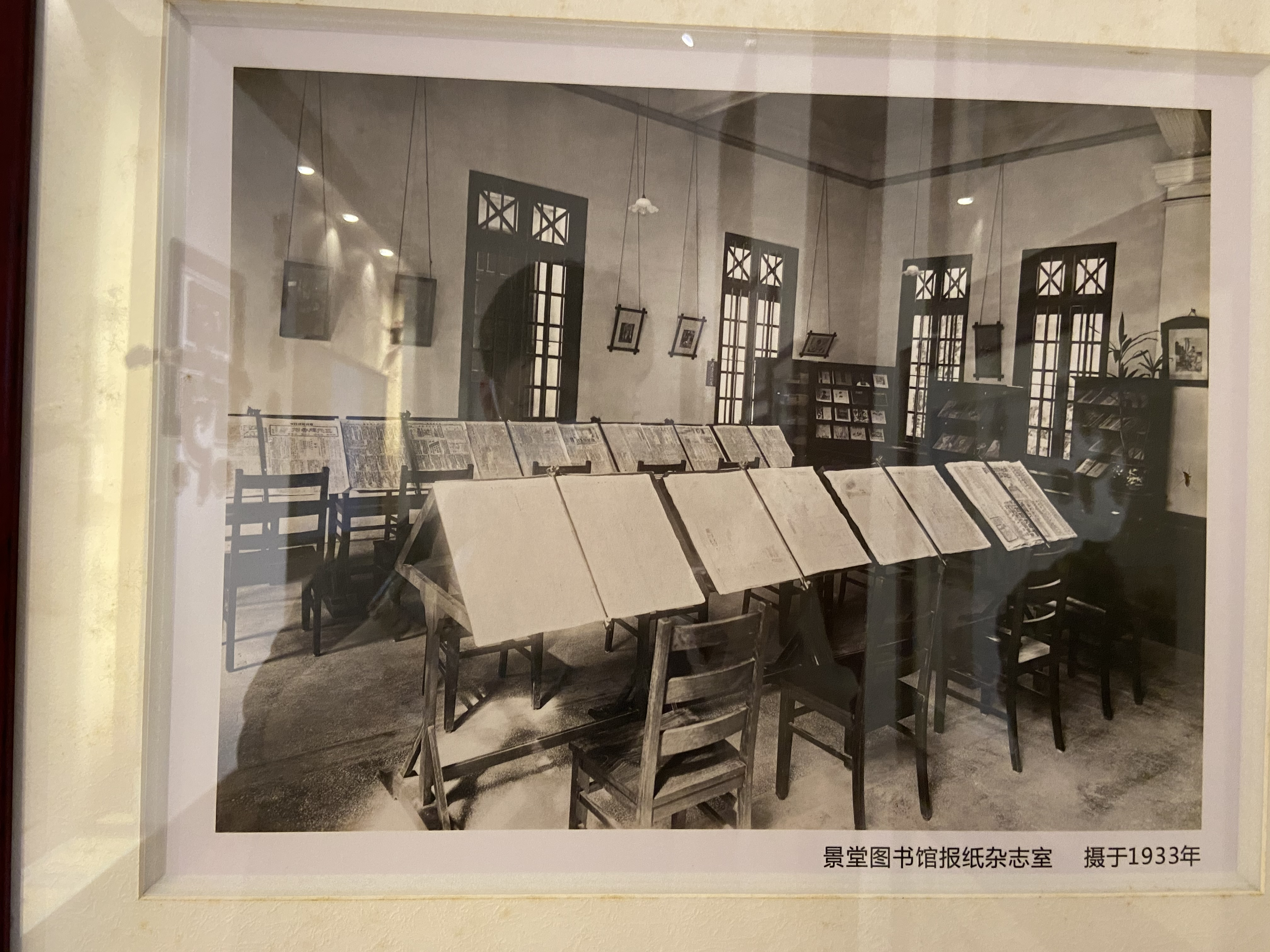
Newspaper and Magazines Room of Jingtang Library in 1933

== History ==
The Jingtang Library was established by Fung Ping Shan. Fung Ping Shan (1860-1931) was born in jiangmenXinhui District. At the age of 16, he moved to Siam (old name of Thailand) for a living. After experiencing success in business, Fung focused on the field of education. In Hong Kong, he donated to build The Chinese University of Hong Kong Library (香港中文大學圖書館), The Chinese General Chamber of Commerce Library. And in Xinhui District, he had established Fung Ping Shan Private School, Woodworking School, and Ping Shan Primary School (新會平山小學).

In 1922, Fung donated 10,000 yuan to build the library on Renshou Fang in the center of Xinhui District. He purchased Tan Mansion in Renshou Road (譚家大屋, a mansion pre-owned by family Tan) and demolished it to build the library. The library was completed in 1925 for an area of 1,250 m^{2} (13,454.89 ft²), and opened to public in June.

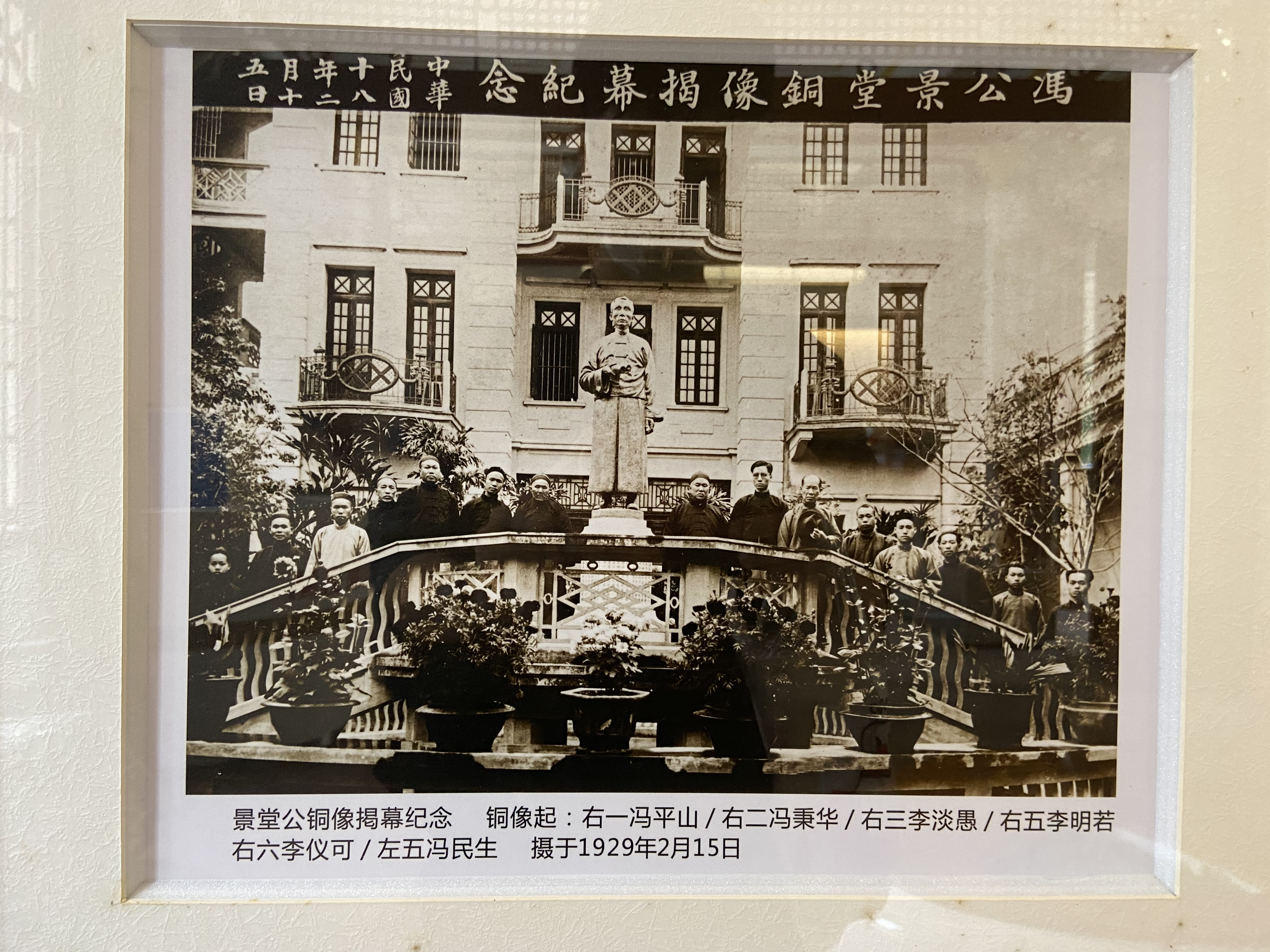
Unveiling Ceremony of Feng Jingtang in 1929

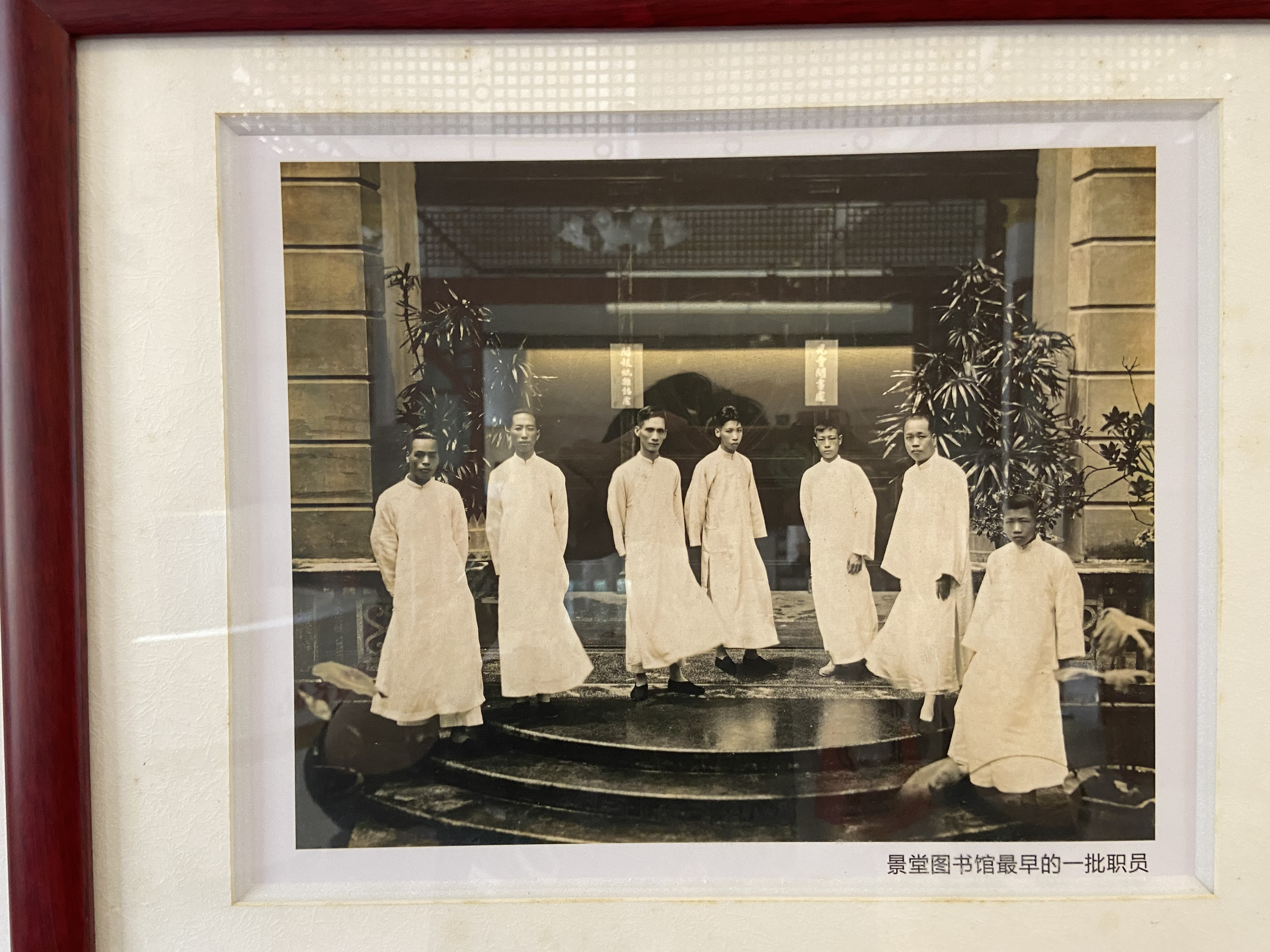
Earliest Clerks of Jingtang Library

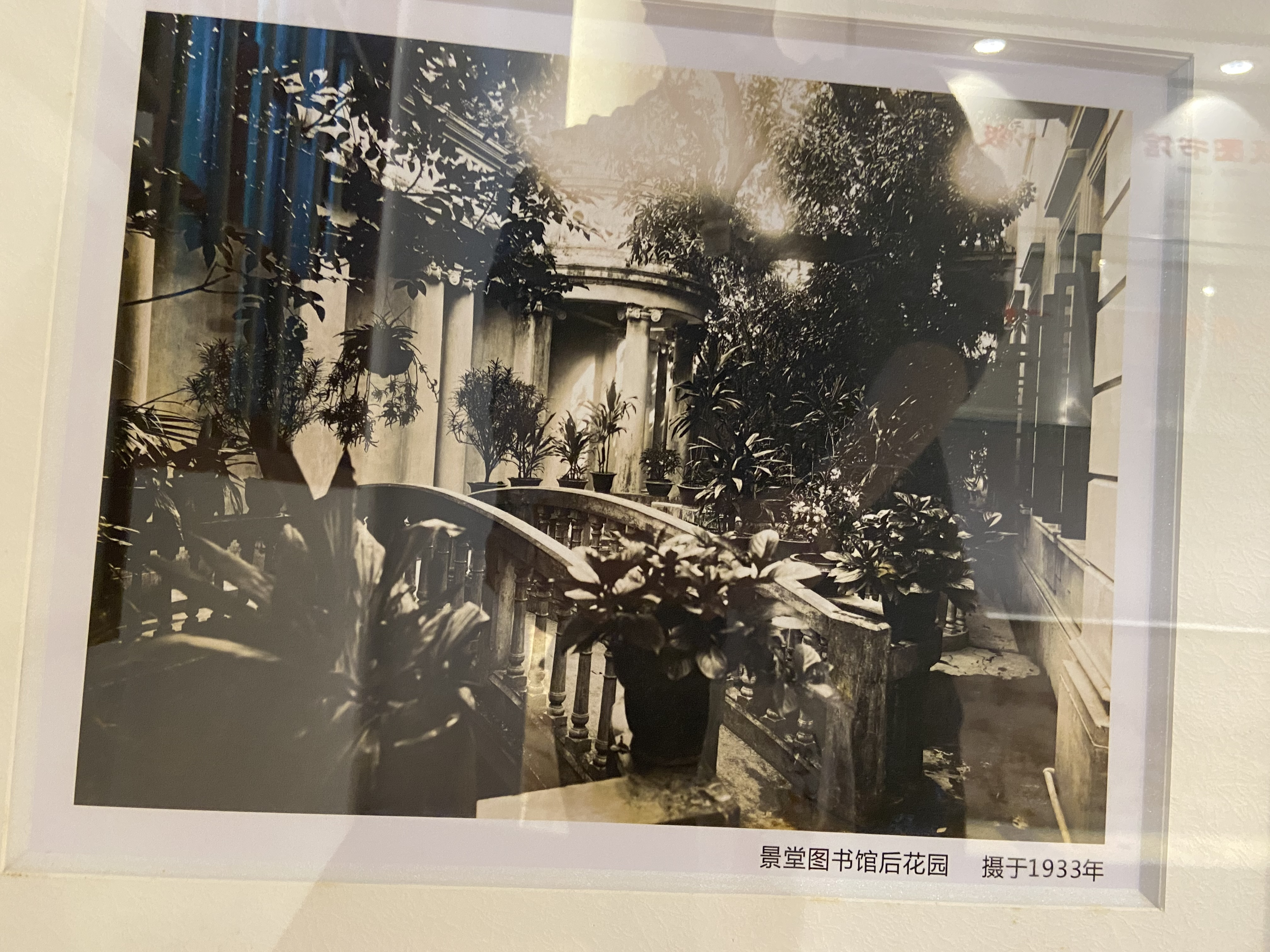
Backyard of Jingtang Library in 1933

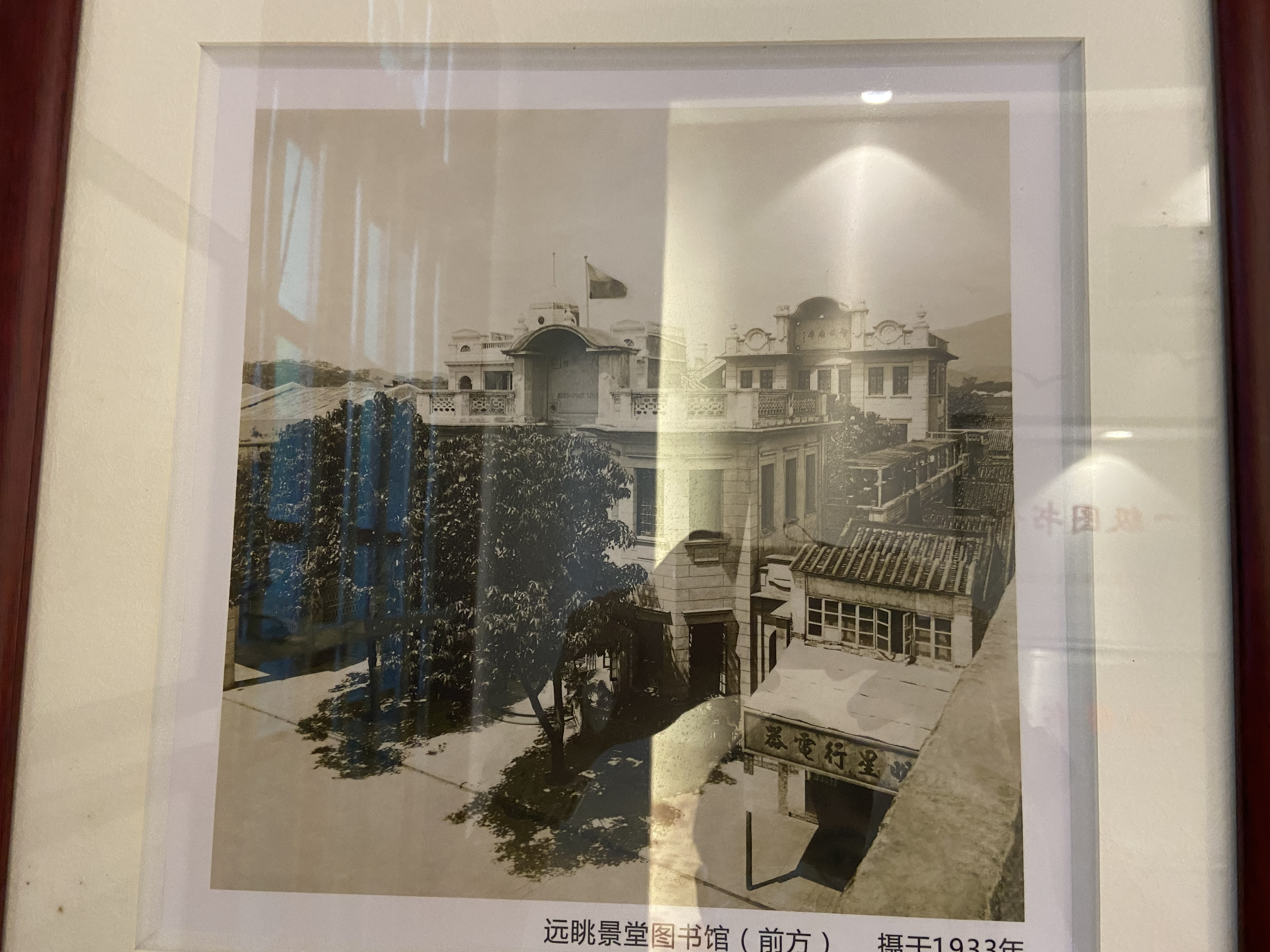
Distant View of Jingtang Library (on the front) in 1933

By 1938, the collections in the library reached 65,945 books. After the Second Sino-Japanese War, when the Xinhui District was occupied, Fung Ping-Wah (馮秉華) and Fung Ping-fan, sons of Fung Ping Shan, assisted the library to evacuate and reopen in Luokeng (羅坑) and Lingchong (凌衝) as branch libraries. In 1939, due to clerks' leaving, branch library of Luokeng was closed and combined into branch library of Luochong. Another branch library, the Tianting branch library (天亭分館), was established in 1941. Until 1949, Jingtang Library was reopened again.

In 1988, Fung Ping-fan donated to the library for refurbishment as well as extension of new building (新館). The new building enlarged the area of the library by 4,030 m^{2} (43,378.56 ft²). In 2012, Huo Zongjie (霍宗傑) donated to build the Huo Zongjie Reading Room to further expand the library. Right now, the total area of the library is 6,510 m^{2} (70073.05 ft²), with more than 400,000 books in its collection.

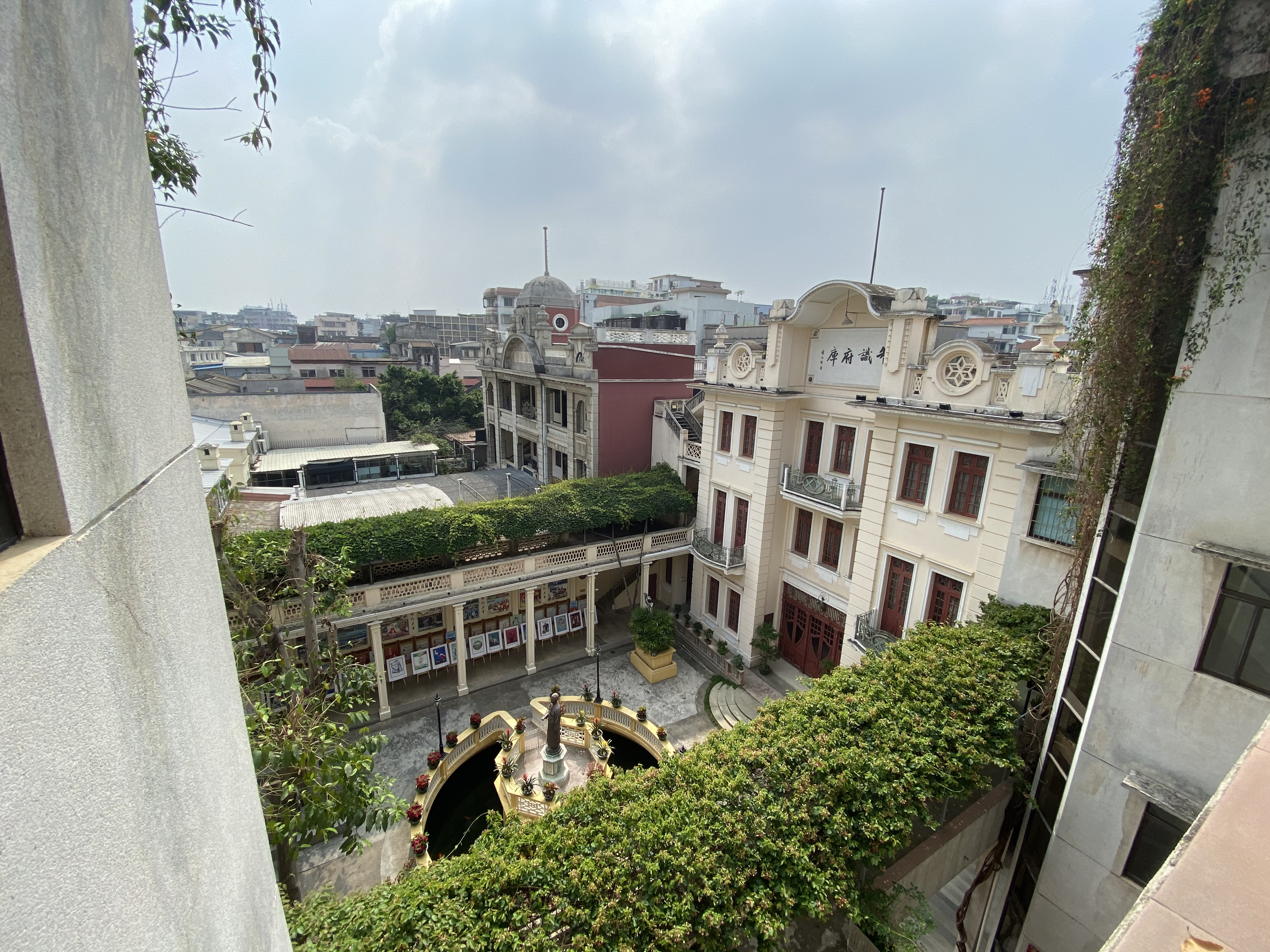
Garden of Jingtang Library in 2021

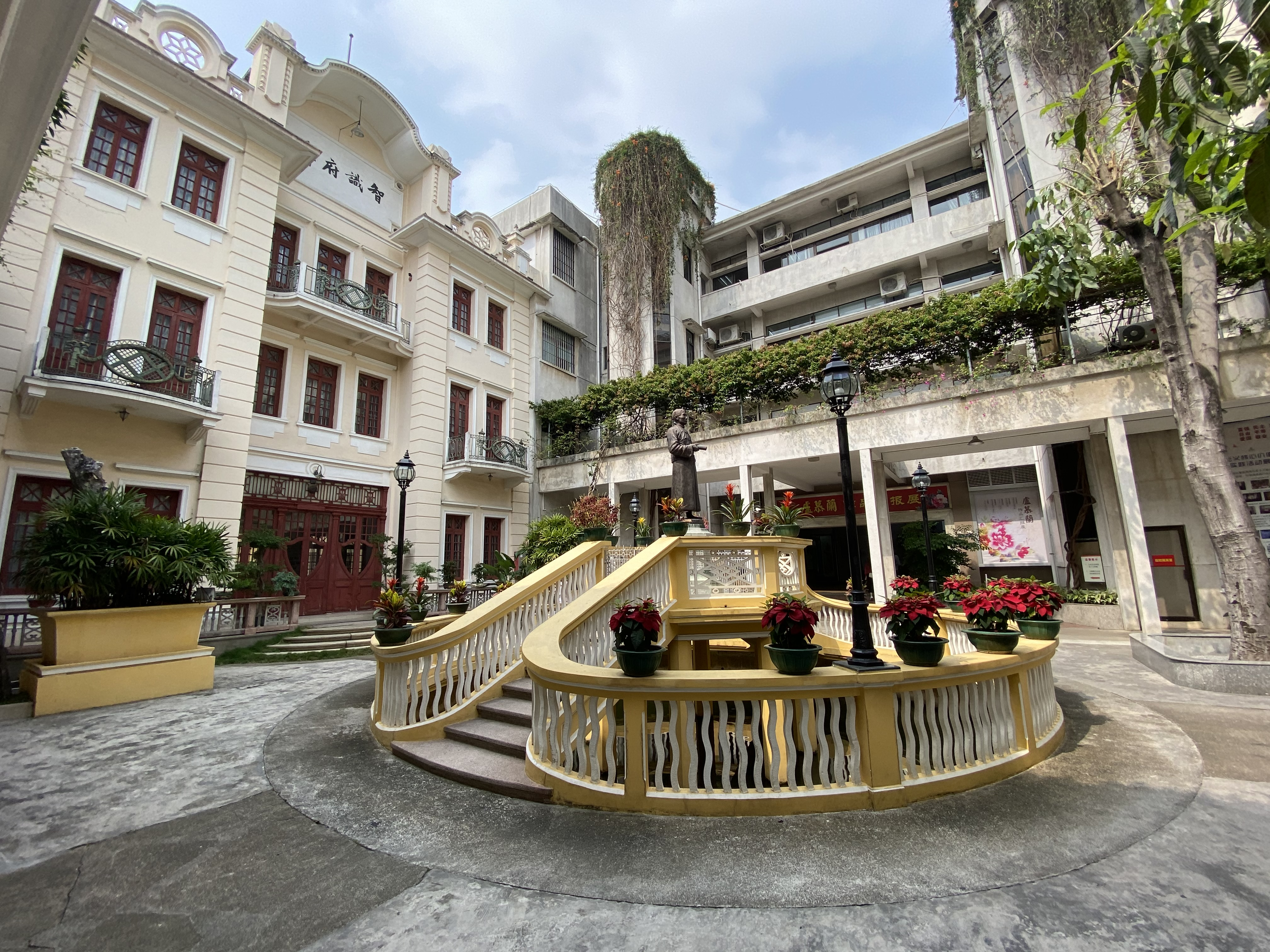
Garden of Jingtang Library in 2021

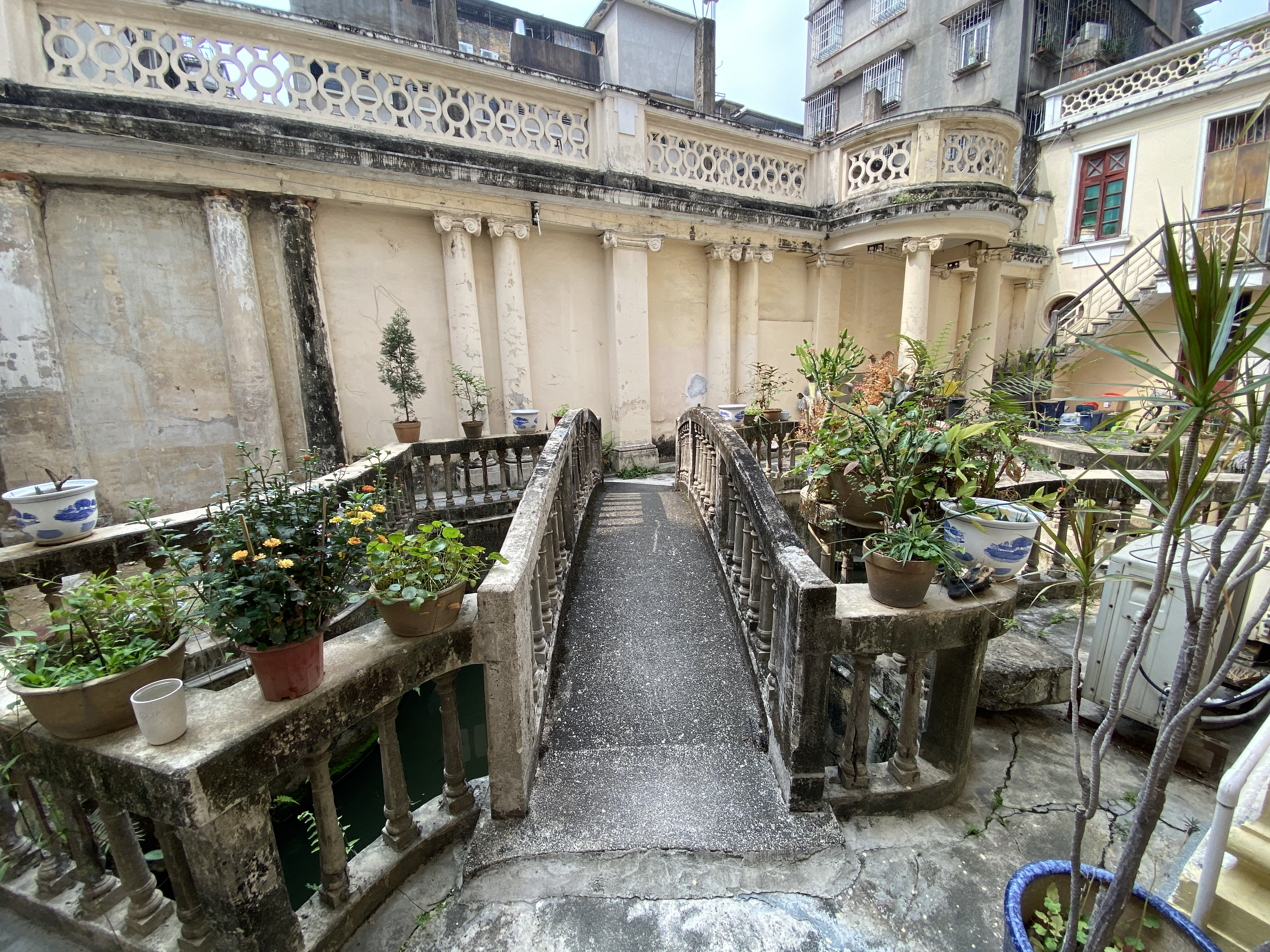
Backyard of Jingtang Library in 2021

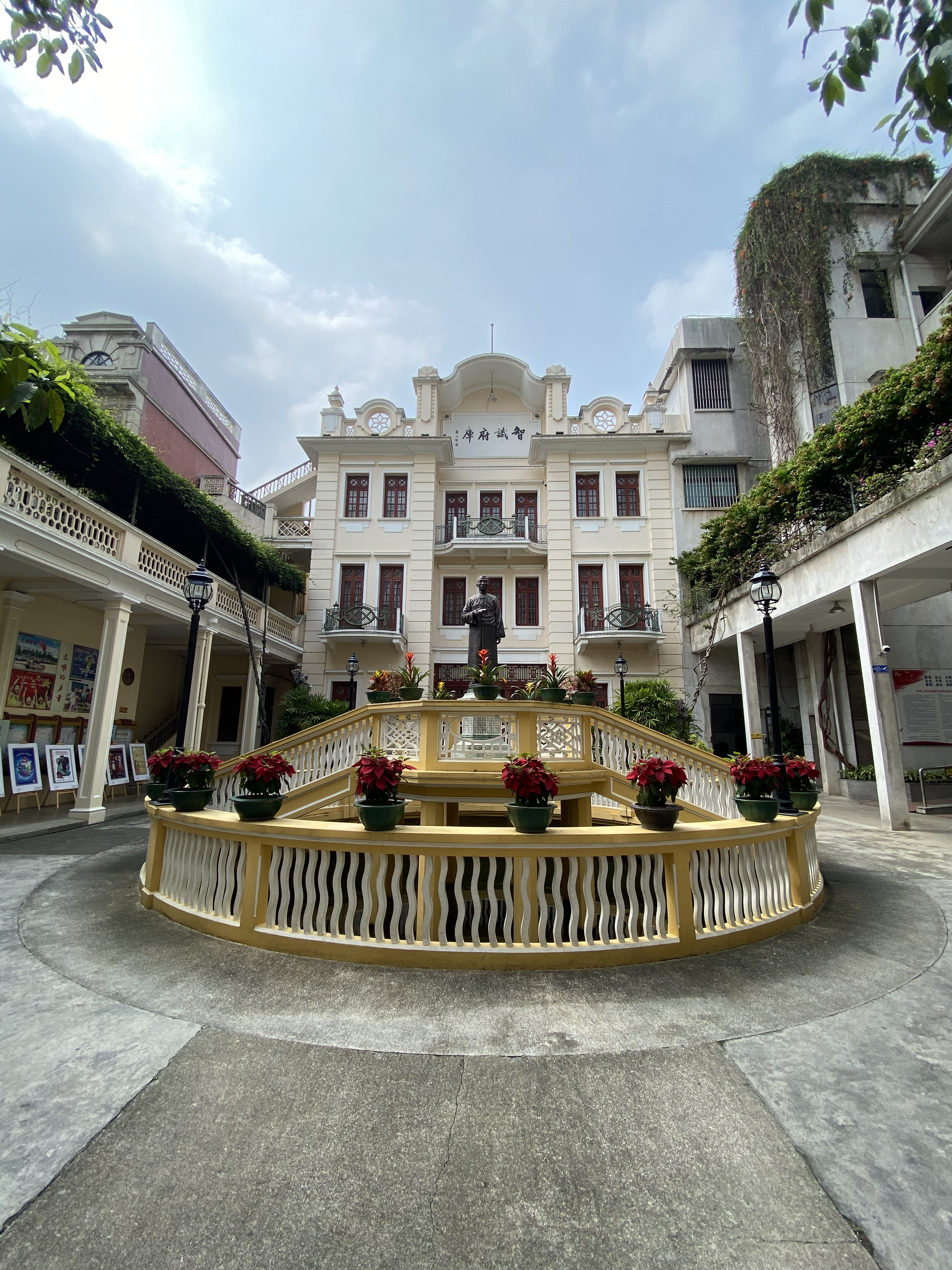
Garden of Jingtang Library in 2021

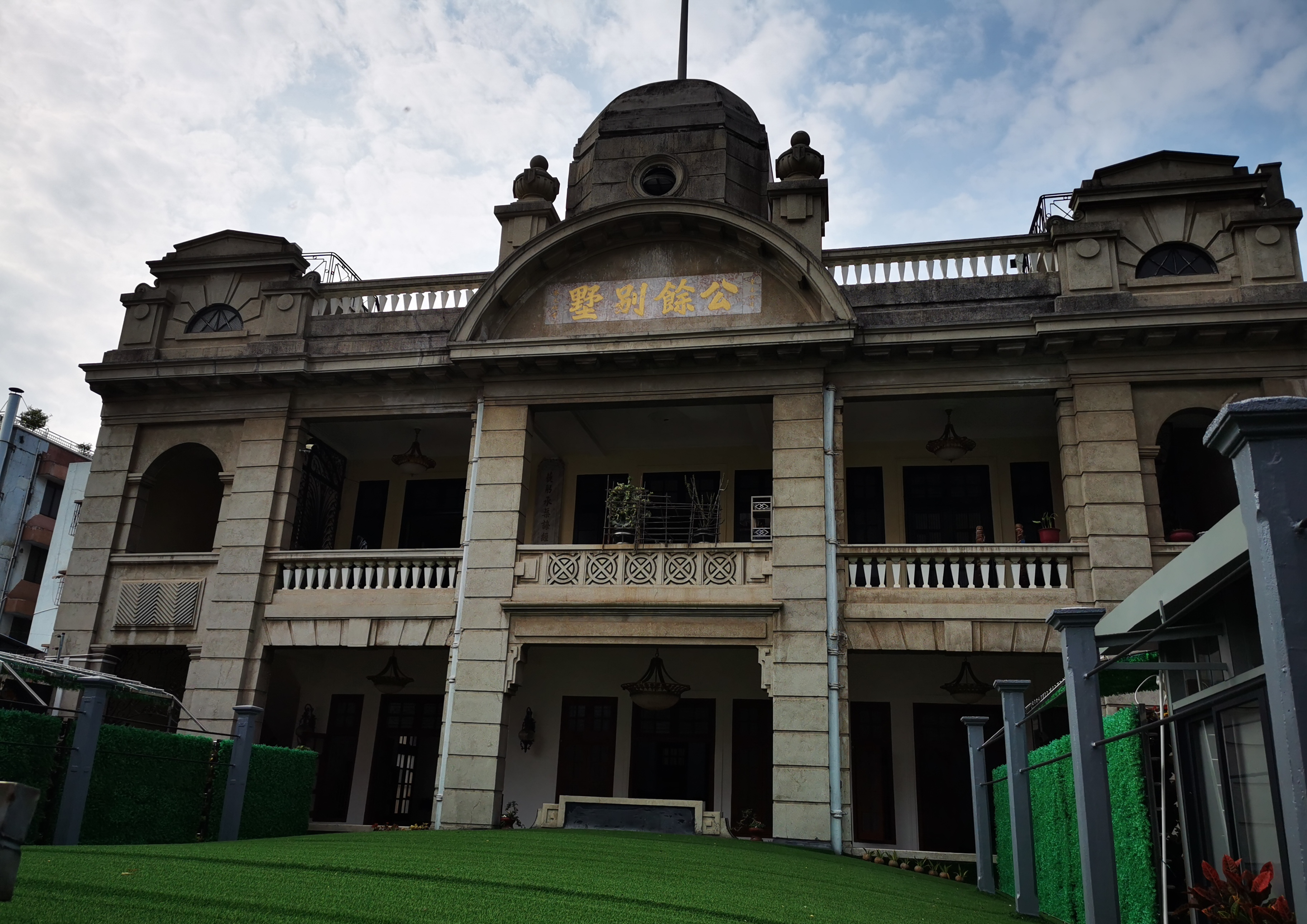
Multicultral centre at Kong Yoo Mansion

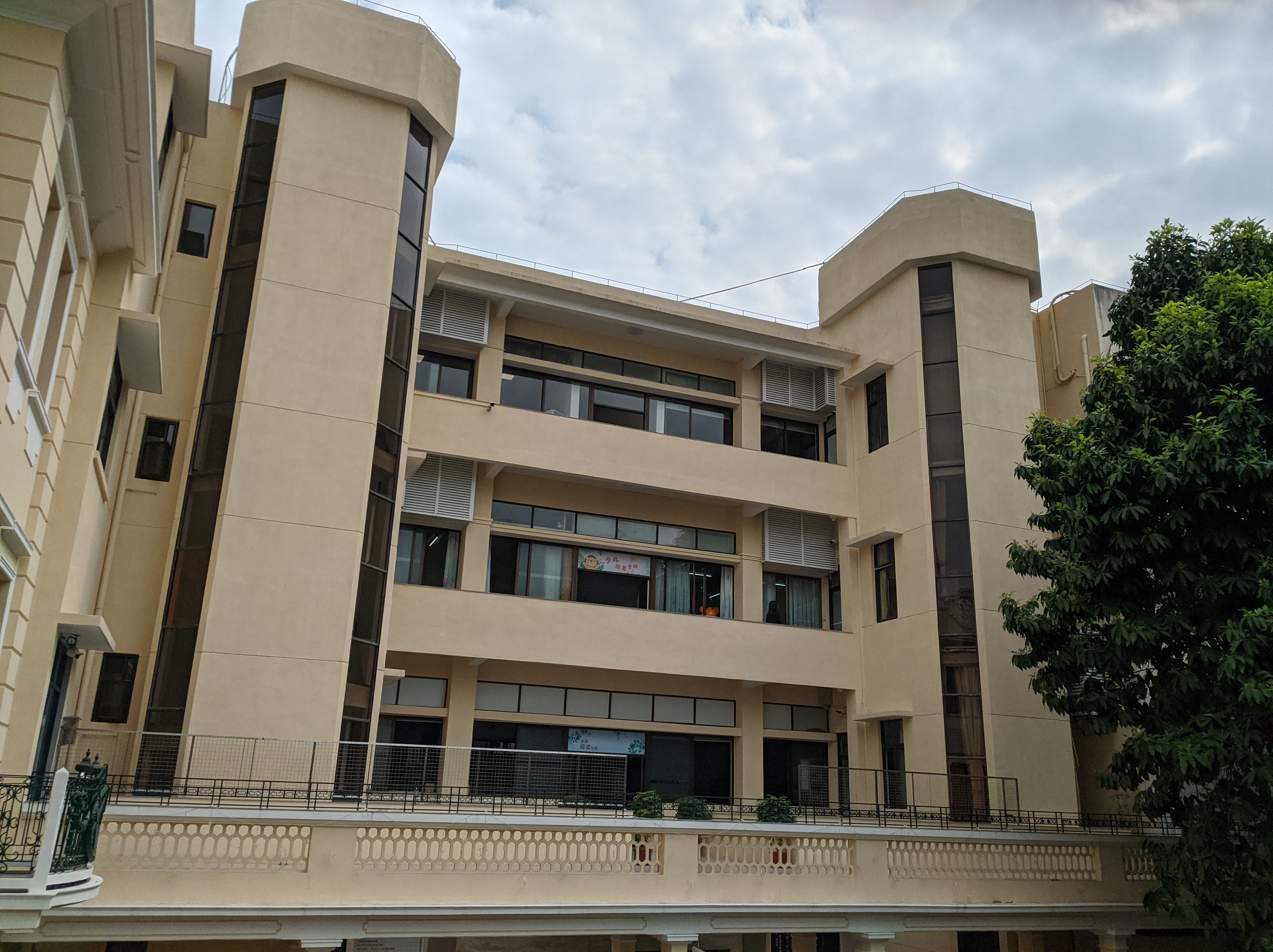
East wing of the library (circa 2023)

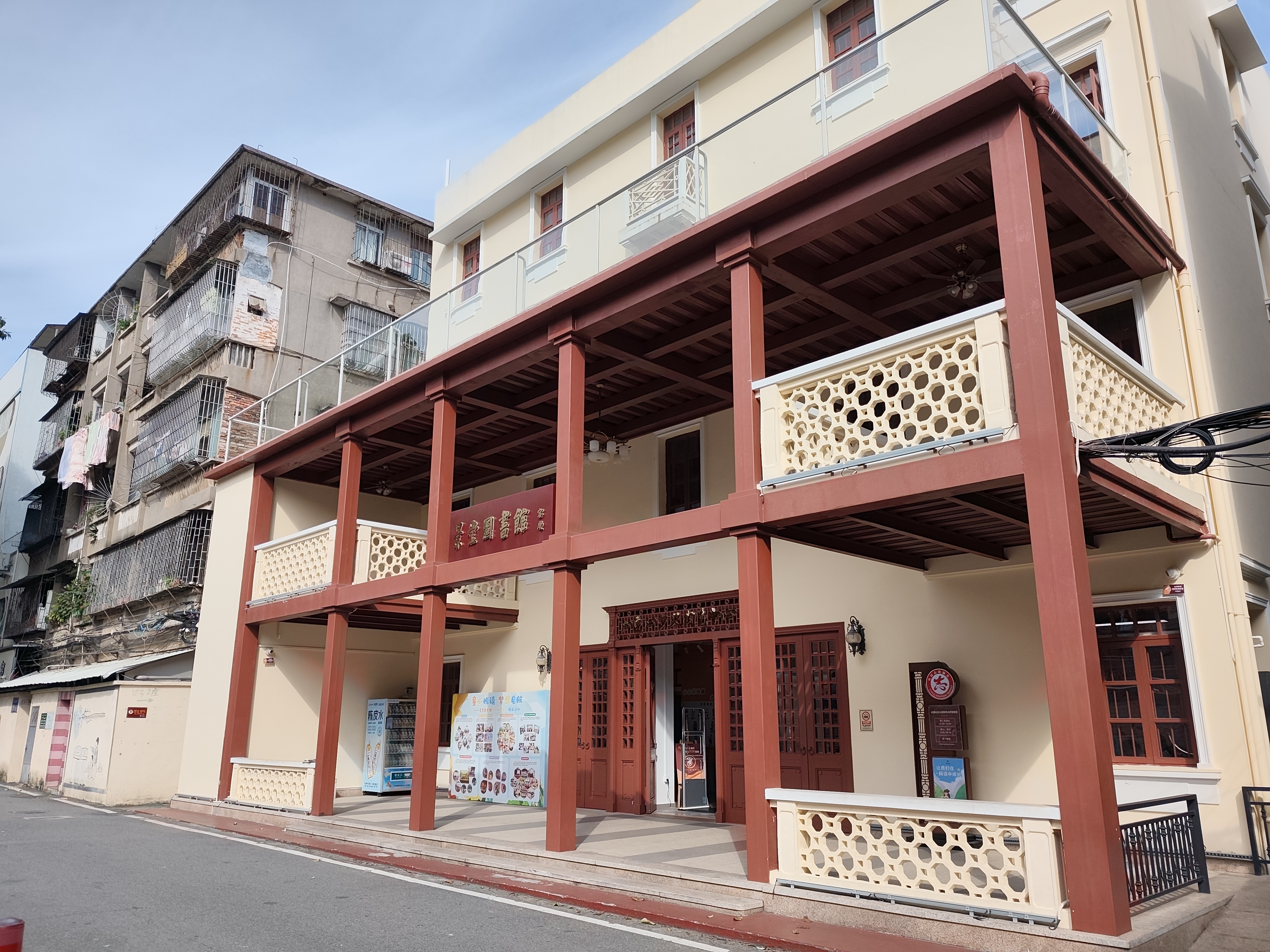
The new children's section at the north of the library

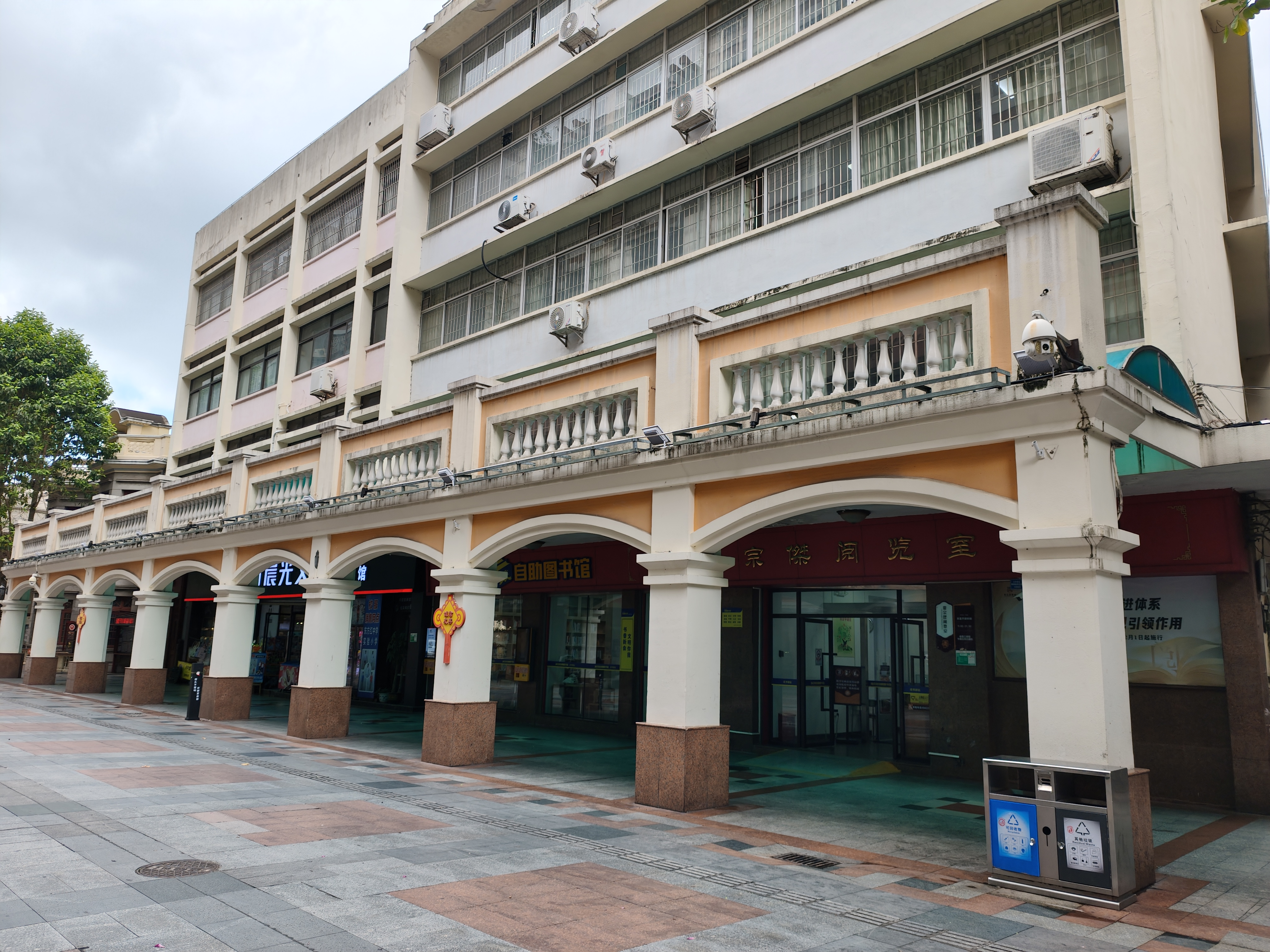
Fok Chung-Kit (Huo Zhongjie) Reading Room

== See also ==
- List of libraries in China
