= Wormhole Library =

Library in Haikou, China

Wormhole Library 云洞图书馆
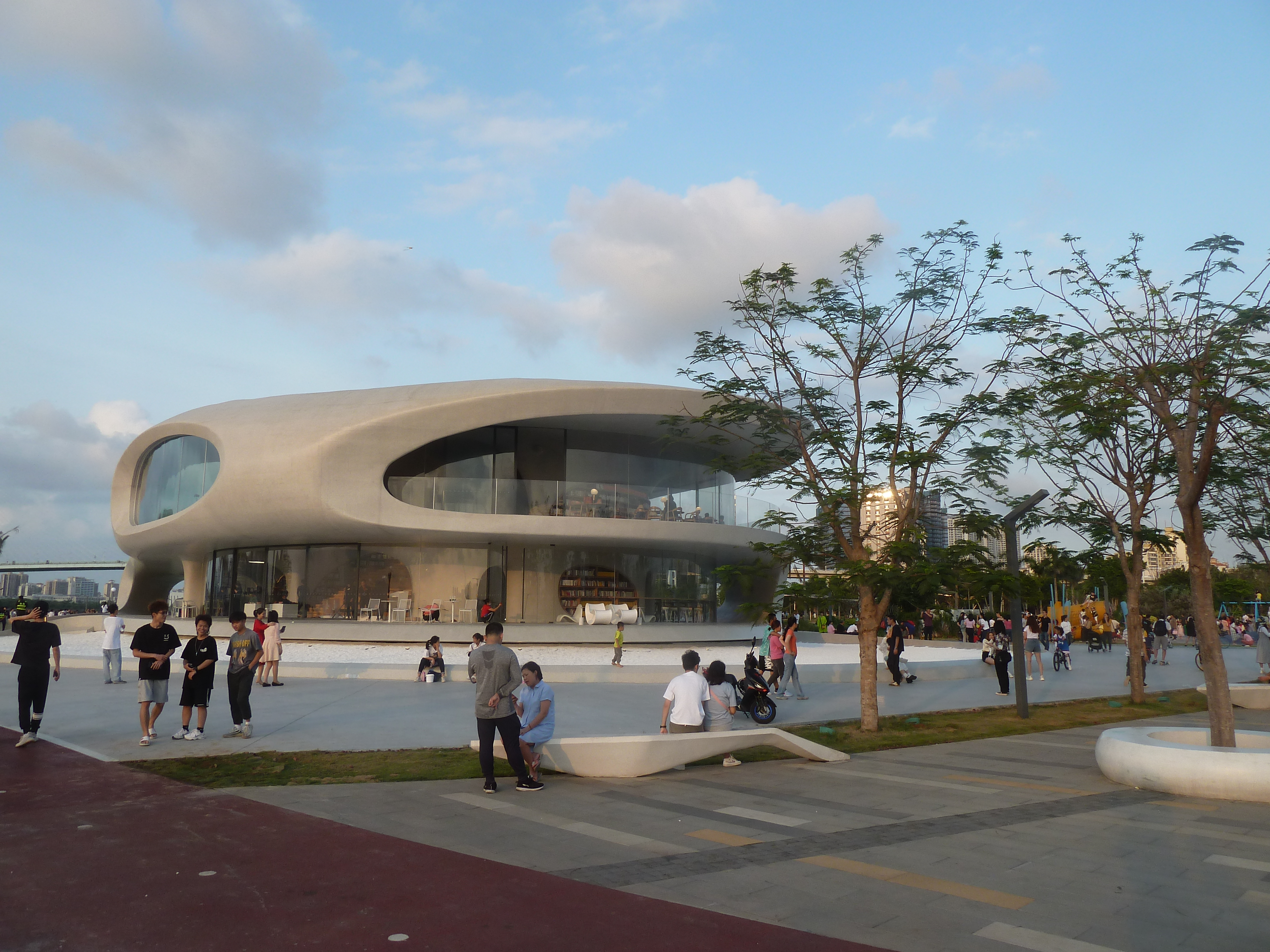
- 20.0487°N 110.3121°E
- Location: Haikou, Hainan, China
- Type: Public library
- Established: 2021
- Branches: 1

The Wormhole Library or Cloud Hole Library (Chinese: 云洞图书馆) is a public library in Haikou city, Hainan, China. It is located on the southeast shore of Haikou Bay, about 100 M west of Haikou Century Bridge, in Century Park.

== See also ==
- Libraries in the People's Republic of China
- Chinese Library Classification (CLC)
- List of libraries in China
