= Tibet Library =

Library in Lasha, Tibet, China

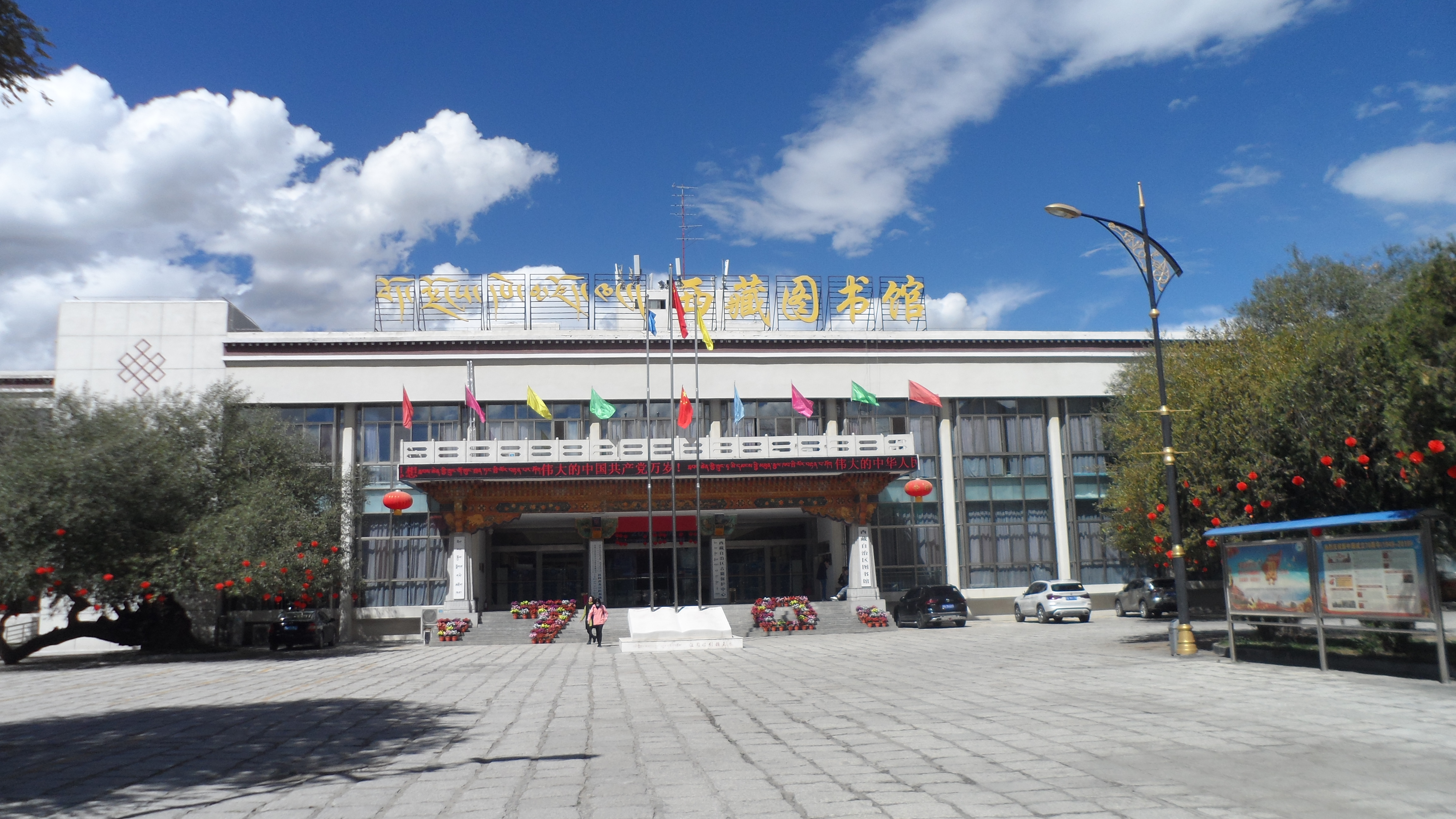
- Tibet Library
- Location: Lhasa
- Type: Public library

Other information
- Website: xzlibrary.cn

The Tibet Library (simplified Chinese: 西藏图书馆; traditional Chinese: 西藏圖書館; Tibetan: བོད་རང་སྐྱོང་ལྗོངས་དཔེ་མཛོད་ཁང་།), or Xizang Library, also known as the Tibet Autonomous Region Library, is an autonomous region-level public library of the Tibet Autonomous Region of China, located at No. 25, Norbulingka Road, Lhasa.

Tibet Library broke ground on May 6, 1991, and was opened to the public in June 1996. The library was set up at a cost of about 100 million yuan. It has 590,000 books and a floor space of 11,000 square metres (120,000 sq ft).

== See also ==
- List of libraries in China
