= Zhejiang University Library =

Chinese library system

Zhejiang University Libraries
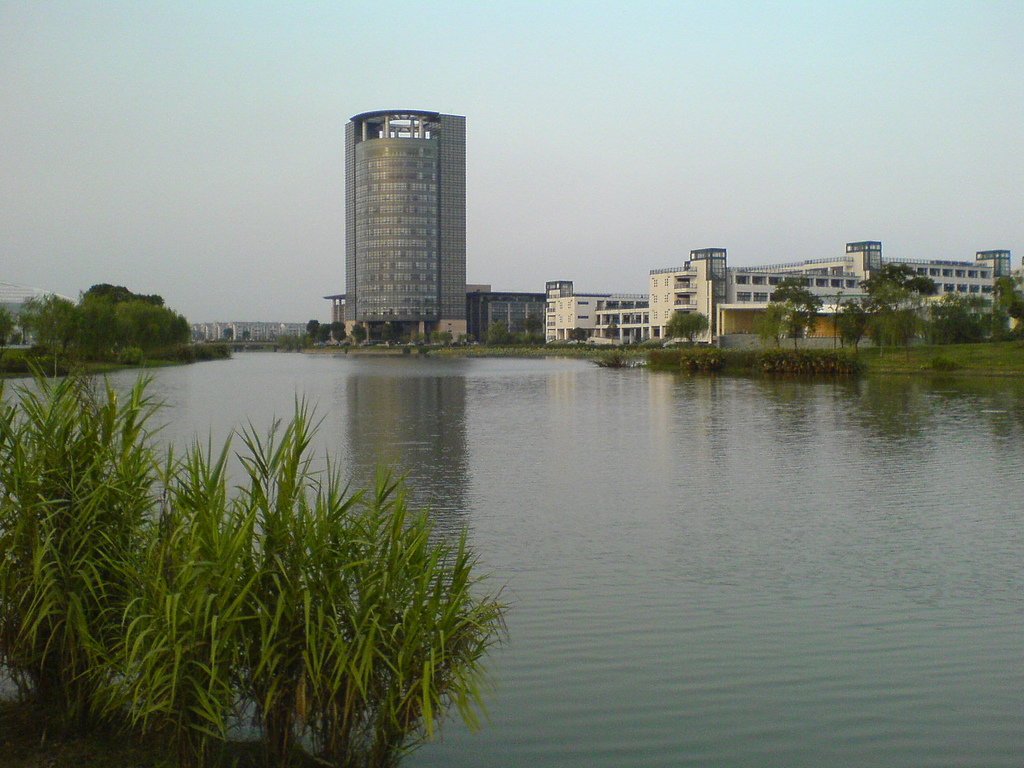
- The building of the Library of General Knowledge (基础分馆) in Zijingang Campus
- 30.263035782898182°N 120.12128845695875°E
- Location: Hangzhou, Zhejiang, China
- Established: 1897; 129 years ago
- Branches: 8

Collection
- Size: 6.9 million books (December 2008)

Access and use
- Circulation: publicly circulate
- Population served: members of the public

Other information
- Budget: n/a
- Director: Mr. LU Dongming (鲁东明)
- Employees: 219
- Website: Homepage; Law Library homepage Million Project

Zhejiang University Library is the libraries system of Zhejiang University, and one of the largest and oldest university libraries in China.

== Introduction ==
Zhejiang University libraries in total had a paper-based collection of about 6.18 million volumes on 10 June 2005, and was ranked as the largest university collection in mainland China. Till December 2008, the collection was largely increased and had a total collection of about 6.9 million volumes, makes it one of two largest university libraries in mainland China, along with Peking University Library in Beijing.

== Libraries ==
The system has several libraries located in different campuses of Zhejiang University. The system mainly has eight branch libraries:

- Library of Science and Technology (科技分馆; in Yuquan Campus)
- Ni Tie-Cheng Library of Humanities (倪铁城人文图书馆; in Yuquan Campus). The library was donated by Hong Kong industrialist Ni Tie-Cheng (倪铁城), who came from Shaoxing, Zhejiang.
- S.W.Yuan Library of Engineering (袁氏工程图书馆; in Yuquan Campus). The library was donated by American scientist Shao-Wen Yuan.
- Library of Arts and Sciences (文理分馆; in Xixi Campus)
- Library of Agriculture (农业分馆; in Huajiachi Campus)
- Library of Medicine (医学分馆; in Zijingang Campus)
- Library of General Knowledge (基础分馆; in Zijingang Campus)
- Guanghua Law School - Law Library (光华法学院图书馆; in Zhijiang Campus)

== CADAL ==
The China-America Digital Academic Library (CADAL) or China-US Million Book Digital Library Project (simply Million Project) was co-constructed by Chinese and American institutes and researchers. At present it's co-managed by Zhejiang University Libraries and the Chinese Academy of Sciences Graduate School. The project was initiated by American and Chinese computer scientists, including Prof. Raj Reddy (CMU), Pan Yunhe (ZJU), etc.

The first meeting of this project was held in Carnegie Mellon University in August 2001. The project was officially launched in December 2002. In November 2005, the internet gateway was set at Zhejiang University Libraries. At present more countries and universities participate in this project and it has about 1.5 million digital volumes.

In December 2005, the partnership between Zhejiang University Libraries and the University of Pittsburgh Library System was established.

== CERDLib ==
The China Education and Research Digital Library (CERDLib) is currently co-managed by Zhejiang University and the Chinese Academy of Sciences Graduate School.

== See also ==
- Libraries in China
- Zhejiang Library
