= Sun Yat-sen Memorial Library =

Library in Zhongshan, Guangdong, China

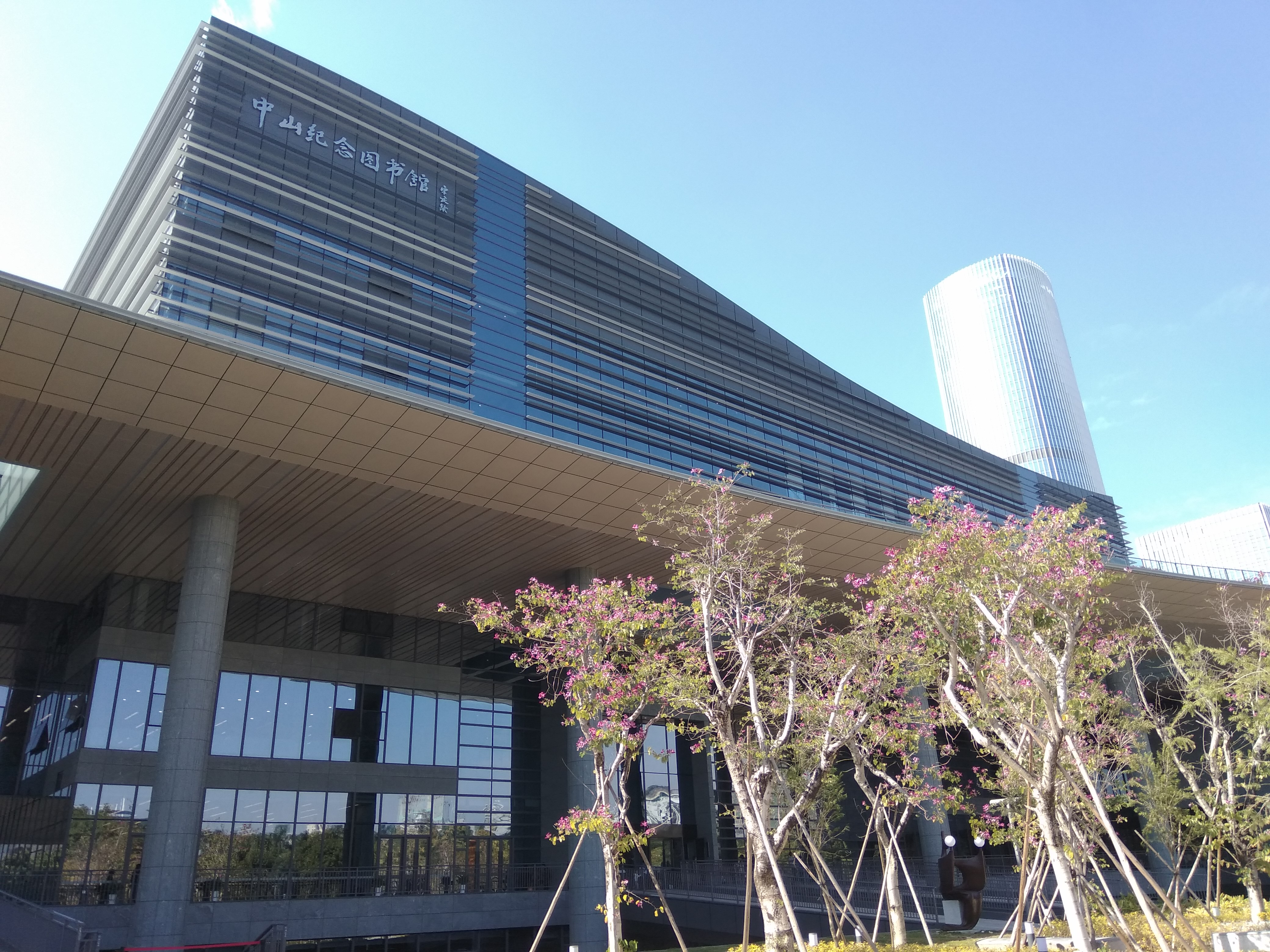
- The new Sun Yat-sen Memorial Library opened in 2019
- 22.5203°N 113.3838°E
- Location: Xingzhong Road, East District, Zhongshan City, Guangdong Province, China
- Type: Municipal public library
- Established: 1935
- Reference to legal mandate: Public Libraries Law of the People's Republic of China

Access and use
- Population served: All citizens of Zhongshan City

Other information
- Website: www.zslib.cn

The Sun Yat-sen Memorial Library, or Zhongshan Memorial Library (simplified Chinese: 中山纪念图书馆; traditional Chinese: 中山紀念圖書館; pinyin: Zhōngshān Jìniàn Túshūguǎn), (Note: "Sun Yat-sen" and "Sun Zhongshan" are names of the same person.) is a municipal public library located in Zhongshan City, Guangdong Province, People's Republic of China. It was established in 1935 to commemorate Sun Yat-sen. The library is affiliated to the Zhongshan Municipal Bureau of Culture, Radio, Television, Press and Publication, and is a national first-class library. It has a construction area of 57,660 square meters. The logo of the library building has an inscription by Song Qingling, honorary president of the People's Republic of China and wife of Sun Yat-sen. Because Zhongshan City’s administrative divisions are rather special (it is a prefecture-level city with no county-level administrative divisions), the Zhongshan Memorial Library is the only large comprehensive public library in the city.

== History ==
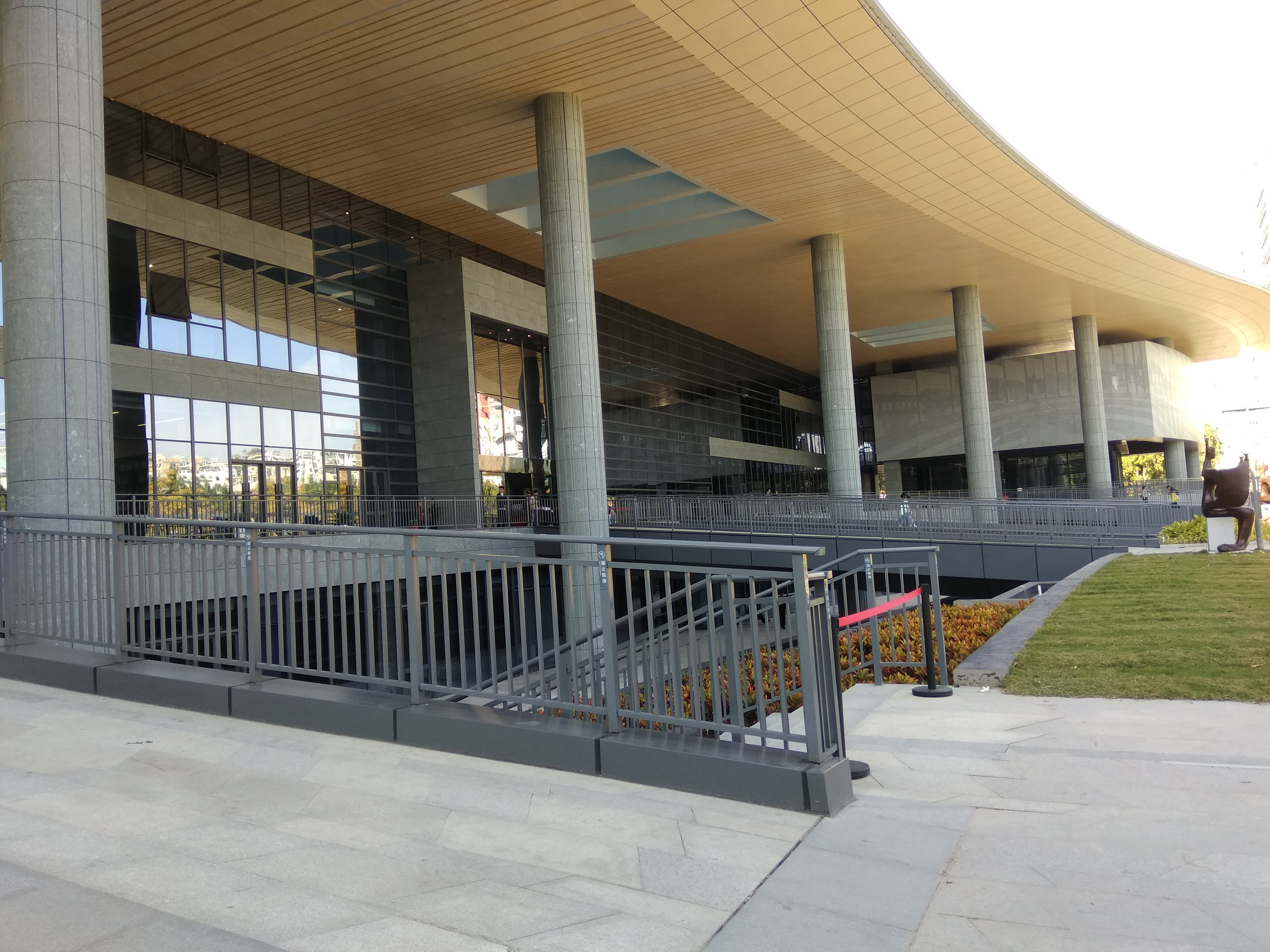
The main entrance of Sun Yat-sen Memorial Library

In 1888, a small library called Shouxiang Building was established in Fengshan Academy. At that time, it was a place only for scholars. In the eighth year of the Republic of China (1919), Xiangshan County Popular Library was established in the Guandi Temple in Tiecheng, but it was relocated several times due to its dark, damp and narrow space, and the books were lost. People at that time believed that, as the hometown of Sun Yat-sen, Xiangshan should have a decent and large library.

On March 12, 1925, Sun Yat-sen died in Beijing at the age of 59. Later, in order to commemorate Sun Yat-sen, Xiangshan County was renamed Zhongshan County. At that time, the government proposed to build a library to commemorate Sun Yat-sen, raise donations, and set up a design committee. The construction of the library began on November 1, 1935. In December of the following year, the first and second floors of the library building were completed on the West Hill (it was the most magnificent building in the area at that time) and opened to the public. It had a building area of 800 square meters and was named the "Sun Yat-sen Memorial Library". After the library was incorporated into the Public Library, various sectors of the county donated money to support its operation and purchase equipment and more than 20,000 books. On February 1, 1937, the Sun Yat-sen Memorial Library was officially unveiled. The then county magistrate Yang Ziyi presided over the unveiling ceremony; it was officially opened on February 10. The plan was to build the third floor the following year, but the library was damaged during the Second Sino-Japanese War, and the plan was naturally shelved. After China's victory in the war, the library reopened on July 11, 1947. With donations from people of all walks of life in the county, the third floor of the library was finally completed in October 1947. The library, with a total area of 1,179 square meters, was renamed "Zhongshan Library".

After the People's Liberation Army entered the city, the government of the People's Republic of China took over the Zhongshan Library in February 1950 and changed its name to "Shiqi People's Library". In 1954, the library began to establish circulating libraries throughout Zhongshan. By the 1960s, there were nearly 200 such libraries. In August 1955, the name was changed to "Shiqi Zhongshan Library". In the 1960s, it was renamed "Zhongshan Library". During the Cultural Revolution, the library was vandalized again. After the Cultural Revolution, people's minds were liberated, the number of library users increased, and the library buildings could not meet the people's cultural needs. Therefore, the government allocated funds to build a two-story children's library (168 square meters in area) behind the original library building. On February 1, 1981, at the suggestion of Soong Ching Ling, Honorary President of the People's Republic of China and wife of Sun Yat-sen, the library was renamed "Sun Yat-sen Memorial Library". At the same time, Soong Ching Ling wrote the name of the library despite being ill. Afterwards, the Zhongshan Municipal Government decided to invest in the construction of a modern library building. With the sponsorship of Mr. and Mrs. Chen Shixian, Chairman of the Thai-Chinese Journalists Charity Foundation (donating millions of Hong Kong dollars), and funding from the Zhongshan Municipal Government, construction of the new library on Xingzhong Road in the East District began in July 1988. In 1991, the new library building was completed and put into use. It is shaped like a Chinese character “日” and has a garden inside, creating a quiet environment. The original library building was converted into a children’s reading center (it is now the office of the Zhongshan Buddhist Association). In 1994, the library was rated as a national third-class library by the Ministry of Culture. In the same year, Zhongshan Children's Library was established, affiliated to the Zhongshan Memorial Library. It was the second independently established children's library in Guangdong Province. In October 1997, a comprehensive art hall and the Fangcheng exhibition hall were built on the third floor of the library. In 1999, the library was rated as a national second-class library.

In 2001, the Zhongshan Children's Library was moved back and merged into the Zhongshan Memorial Library, and its building was used for other purposes. In 2005, the library was upgraded to a national first-class library and has maintained that status ever since. In 2009, it became the director library of the Youth Reading Promotion Committee of the Chinese Library Association, and took this opportunity to create a number of activities related to the promotion of youth reading. After the construction of the new library was included in the key construction projects of Zhongshan City's "12th Five-Year Plan", the original library building was renovated in October 2012 and the library was temporarily moved to the Huakai Branch in the East District. In 2014, the foundation stone for the new building of Sun Yat-sen Memorial Library was laid. On November 4, 2019, a bronze statue based on the Sun Yat-sen statue in the memorial hall of the Sun Yat-sen Mausoleum and cast by the French art studio Susse was installed in front of the new library. On November 12, the new Sun Yat-sen Memorial Library opened and started its trial operation.

During the epidemic of Covid from late 2019, the library was closed or had opening hours limited.

== Buildings ==
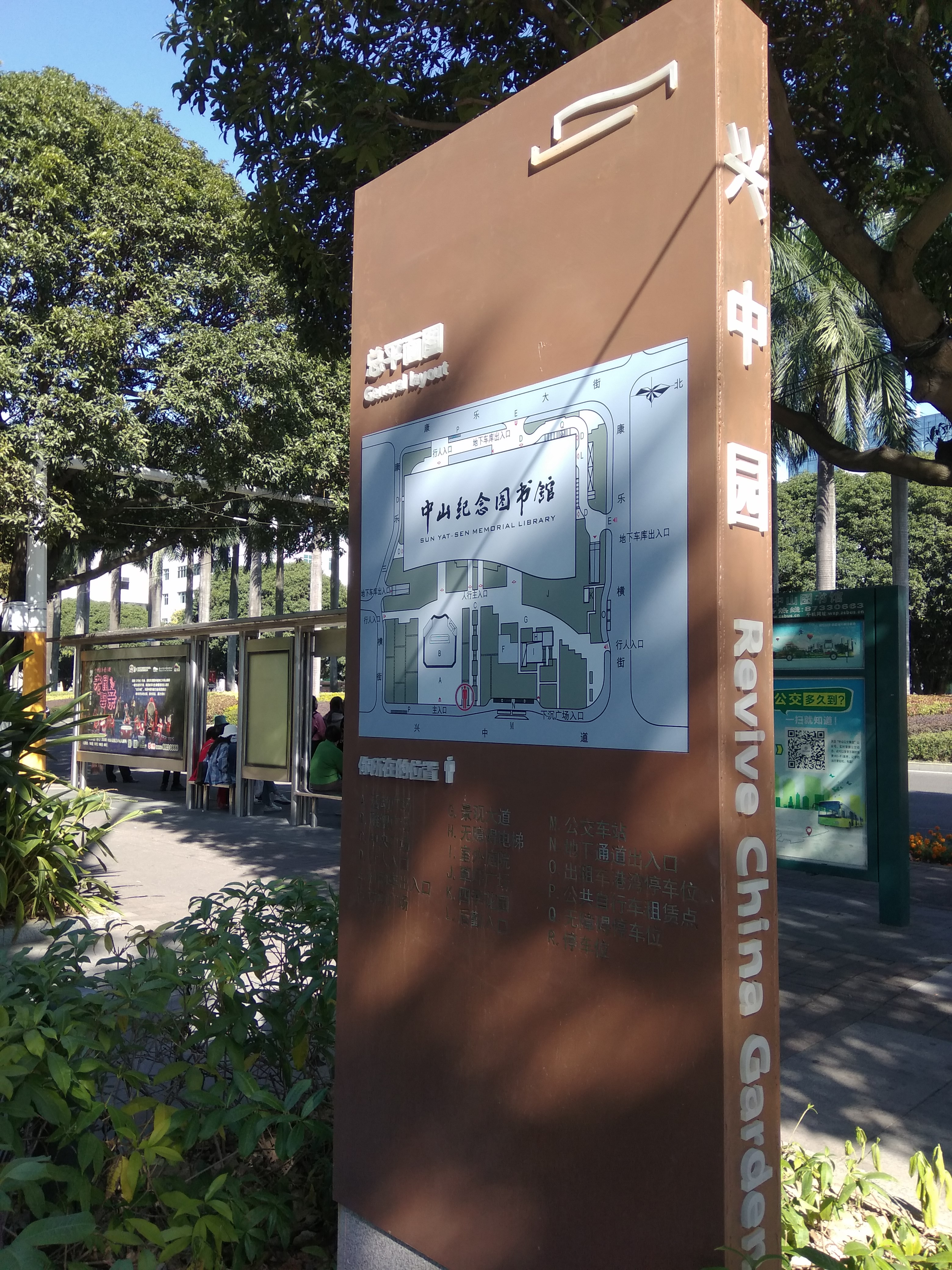
Floor plan of the library

The Sun Yat-sen Memorial Library is located on Xingzhong Road in the East District of Zhongshan City, west of the Zhongshan Municipal People's Government. It is 41.2 meters high, with two underground floors and seven above-ground floors, covering an area of 57,660 square meters. The library is designed jointly by Nippon Sekkei Co., Ltd. and East China Architectural Design Institute Co., Ltd to hold 3.2 million books. The design followed the philosophy of “humanity, technology, greenness, and convenience for the readers”.

The library is mainly divided into "two platforms", "three centers", "four studies", "five halls", "six areas", "seven rooms" and "eight theme libraries":

Two platforms	Information Resource Interactive Platform				Reading Space Sharing Platform			
Three centers	Document Resource Center		Knowledge Media Center			Citizen Reading Promotion Center		
Four studies	Citizen Study Room	Zhongshan Study Room (Self-service Library)		Sun Yat-sen Study Room		Classic Study Room		
Five halls	City Living Hall	Variety Hall	Lecture Hall	Leisure Exchange Hall		Fangcheng Hall		
Six areas	Self-service area	Outdoor Leisure Reading Area	Document Lending Area	Reading Experience Area		Logistics Equipment Area	Newspaper and Magazine Reading Area	
Seven rooms	Visually Impaired Reading Room	Digital Reading Experience Room	Recording Room	Creative Room	Hi-fi Room	Training Room	Multimedia Reading Room	
Eight theme libraries	Music Library	Life Special Document Library	Original Classic Library	Calligraphy Library	Children's Library	Children's Fun Library	CPPCC Literature and History Library	Ancient Book Library

The library has 2,000 reading seats. It is quite spacious, with floor-to-ceiling glass walls in some areas. In addition, facilities such as heat recovery, solar water heating, roof greening, rainwater recycling, and water-retaining turf make the museum more green and energy-efficient. Large spaces in the library use a full air conditioning system, while other areas use a combination of various air supply methods. A variety of curtain walls are used in the library. The large mural "Xiangshan Constellation" in the atrium of the museum depicts 26 famous people from Zhongshan, with a total area of 187 square meters. It is the largest indoor mosaic mural in China. The statue of Sun Yat-sen on the fourth floor of the library is a replica of the marble seated statue of Sun Yat-sen in the Sun Yat-sen Mausoleum (created by French sculptor Paul Landowski). In 2016, on the 150th anniversary of Sun Yat-sen's birth, Landowski's descendants decided to authorize the French Susse Art Workshop to cast a bronze statue of Sun Yat-sen, which was eventually purchased by Sun Yat-sen collector Huang Dingzhong. In addition, there is another statue of Sun Yat-sen in the library, as well as large outdoor murals "Tracing Sun Yat-sen", "Gentle Breeze in the Forest" series of stained glass, "Gate of the Future" series of murals and other art works, all of which were created by Professor Tang Hui, Dr. Han Xiaodong and their team from the Central Academy of Fine Arts.

== Library Services ==
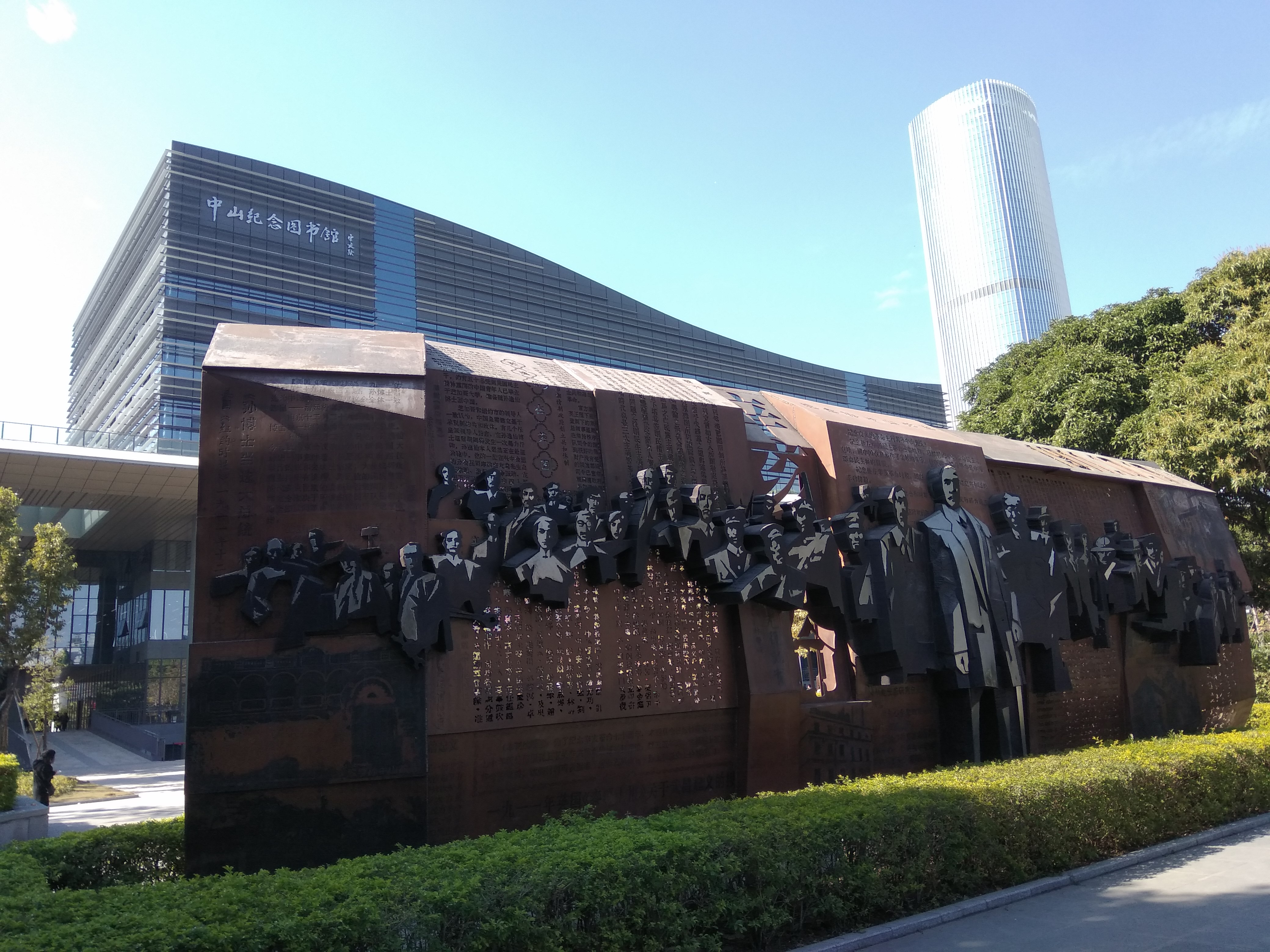
Outside of the Sun Yat-sen Memorial Library

=== Overview ===
The Zhongshan Memorial Library is affiliated with the Zhongshan Municipal Bureau of Culture, Radio, Television, Press and Publication. Its mission is to put “readers first, service first” and its management policy is “innovation and pragmatism, efficient management, high-quality service, and reader satisfaction”. The library consists of five departments: Information Technology Department, Office, Editorial Department, Loan Department, and Counseling and Education Department. The total number of paper documents in the Sun Yat-sen Memorial Library is approximately 3 million copies. In addition to ordinary books, Sun Yat-sen’s posthumous works and speech recordings, as well as local documents of Zhongshan City, are also the main collection objects of the library.

=== Activities in the Museum ===
The museum has held various activities including "Children's Storytelling", "Moms' Storytelling", "Xiangshan People Traveling the World", "Green Summer Vacation", "Citizen Reading Month", "Book Showing", "Book Drifting", and "Selection of the Top Ten Book-loving Families". In addition, the "Xiangshan Forum" is held regularly, which is one of Zhongshan City's brand cultural activities.

=== Information Technology Services ===
As early as 1995, the editing and circulation departments of the Sun Yat-sen Memorial Library implemented computer-automated management. In 2000, the management system was replaced, and newspapers and periodicals were also included in computer management. In 1997, a multimedia reading room was opened in the library. In 1998, the library established its official website. Since 2016, the Sun Yat-sen Memorial Library has also built an “omni-media digital service platform” to provide all-media online services, including four major platforms: digital publishing, integrated services, publicity and promotion, and business support.

The new library, which opened in 2019, has a "waterfall flow" in the first-floor lobby. Book cover images fall like a waterfall on the electronic screen. Clicking on a cover will display the book introduction and a QR code for the audio book. In the "Listening Space" on the second floor of the library, headphones with adjustable length are hung from the ceiling, and you can listen to audio books by pressing the play button. There are self-service card issuance machines and self-service borrowing and returning machines in the lobby, the latter of which also supports facial recognition. The automatic book sorting system installed on the basement floor of the library reduces the burden on staff.

=== Branch Libraries ===
The Zhongshan Memorial Library is a municipal public library in Zhongshan City. It serves as the main library, with 24 town libraries in 24 towns serving as branches, 26 neighborhood self-service libraries and 270 village libraries serving as grassroot service points. A three-level service system of main and branch libraries and a free borrowing and returning service model have been established.

== See also ==
- National first-class library
- Sun Yat-sen Library of Guangdong Province
- List of libraries in China
