= Guandi Temple =

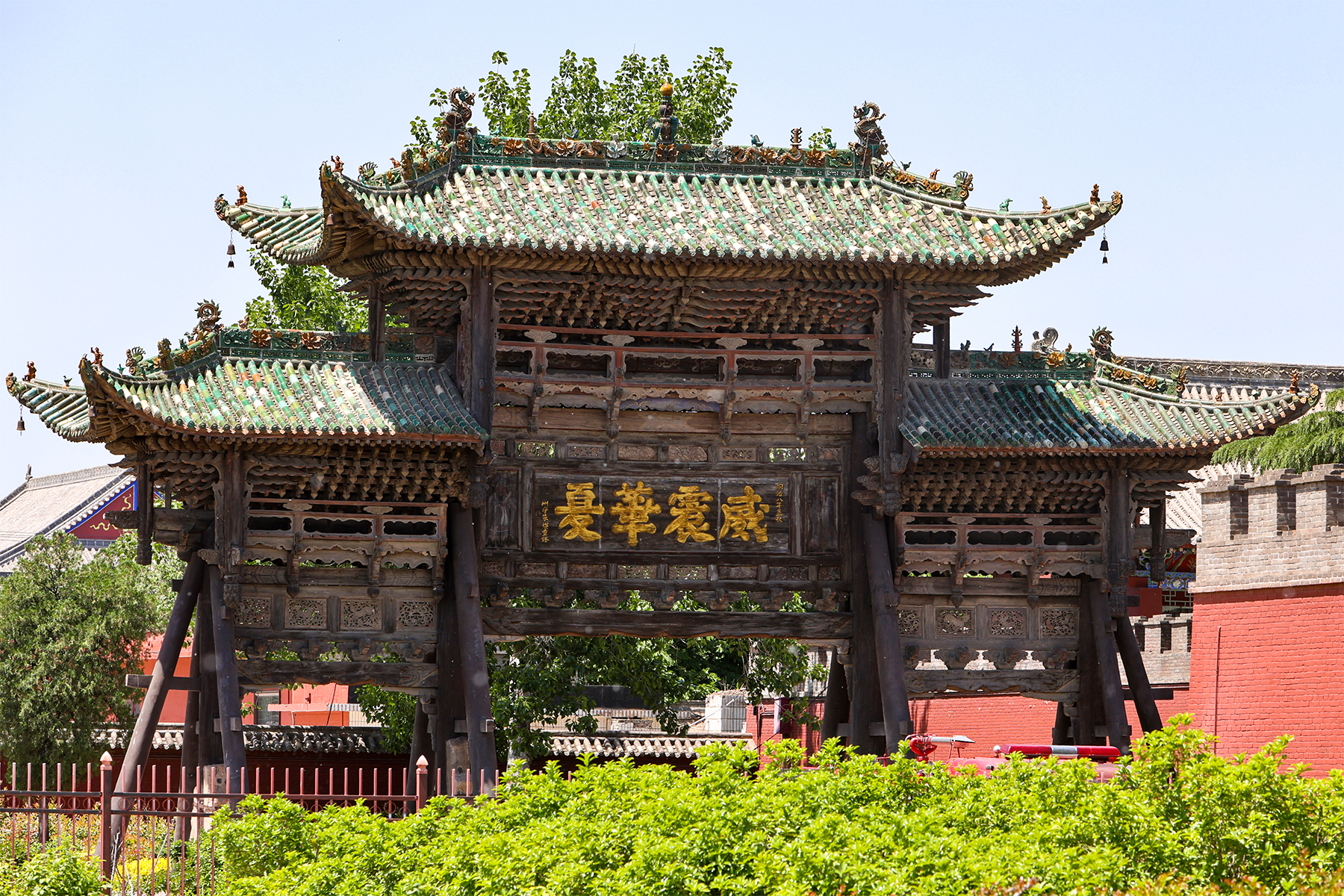
Haizhou Guandi Temple in Yuncheng, Shanxi, one of the largest Guandi Temples in Sinosphere

A number of Guandi Temples or Emperor Guan Temples (關帝廟) exist in the world dedicated to the 3rd-century Chinese general Guan Yu:

== China ==
=== Mainland China ===
- Haizhou Emperor Guan Temple in Yuncheng, Shanxi, where Guan Yu was born
- Guanlin (關林) in Luoyang, Henan, where Guan Yu's head was purportedly buried
- Guanling (Hubei) (關陵) in Dangyang, Hubei, where the rest of Guan Yu's body was buried
- Guandi Temple (Gongqingtuan Road) in Jinan, Shandong

=== Hong Kong ===
- Kwan Tai temples in Hong Kong
- Hip Tin temples in Hong Kong
- Man Mo temples in Hong Kong

=== Macau ===
- Sam Kai Vui Kun

== Australia ==
- See Yup temple, South Melbourne
- Sze Yup Temple, Sydney

== East Timor ==
- Chinese Temple of Dili, East Timor, known in Chinese as the "Guandi Temple of East Timor" (東帝汶關帝廟)

== Malaysia ==
- Kuala Lumpur Guandi Temple, Malaysia

== South Korea ==
- Dongmyo in Seoul, South Korea

== Thailand ==
- Guan Yu Shrine, Khlong San, Thailand

== Taiwan ==
- Spring and Autumn Pavilions, Kaohsiung
- State Temple of the Martial God, Tainan
- Xingtian Temple, Taipei

== United States ==
- Kong Chow Temple in San Francisco, California
- Temple of Kwan Tai in Mendocino, California
