= Guangzhou Library =

Public library in Guangzhou, China

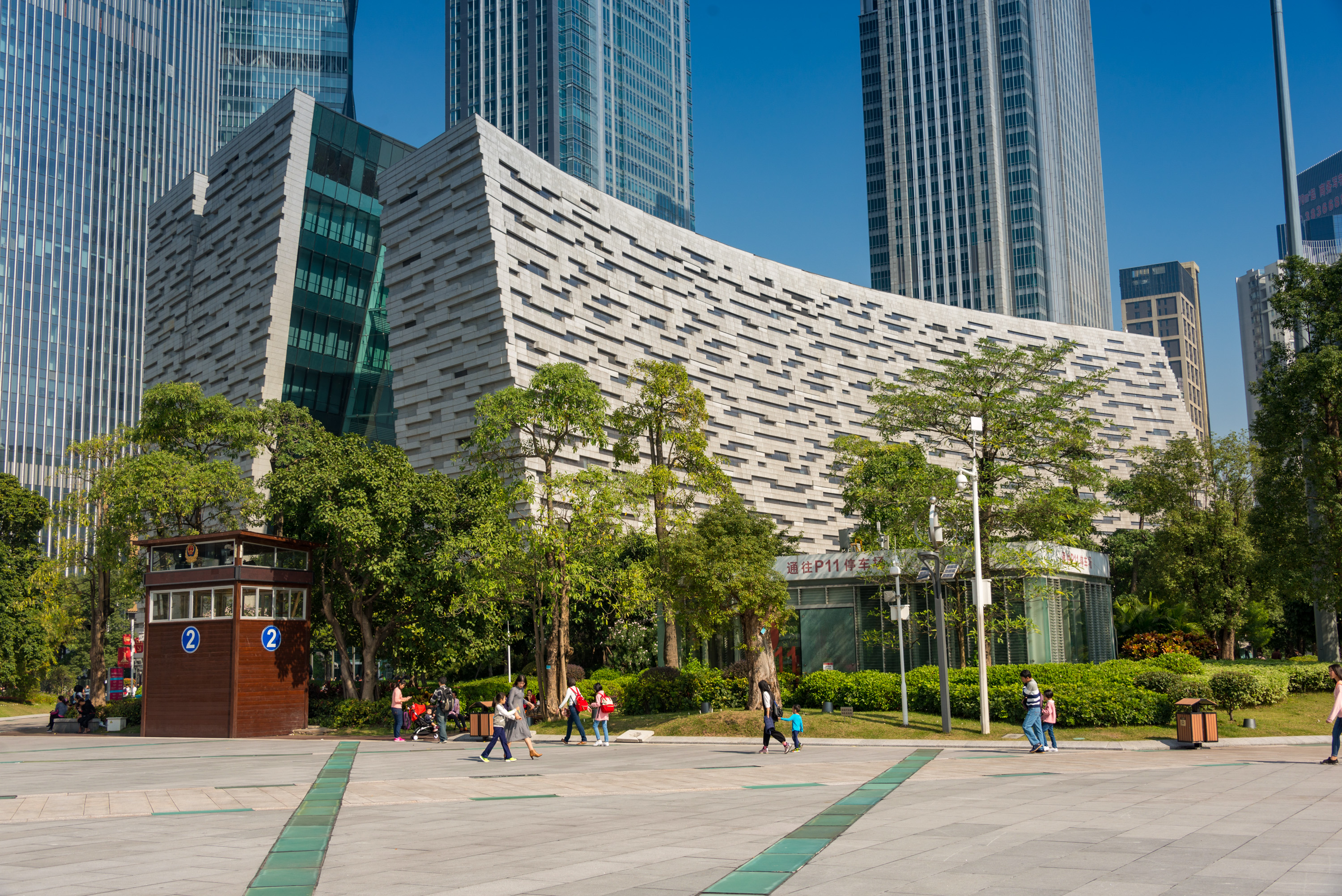
- Location: Zhujiang New Town, Guangzhou, China
- Type: Public
- Established: 1982; New building: 2013
- Architect: Nikken Sekkei

Collection
- Size: 8.433 million

Other information
- Director: Fang Jiazhong
- Employees: 295
- Website: www.gzlib.org.cn

Guangzhou Library
- Simplified Chinese: 广州图书馆
- Traditional Chinese: 廣州圖書館
Transcriptions
Standard Mandarin
- Hanyu Pinyin: Guǎngzhōu Túshūguǎn
Yue: Cantonese
- Jyutping: gwong2 zau1 tou4 syu1 gun2

Guangzhou Library (Chinese: 广州图书馆) is a public library in Guangzhou, capital of Guangdong province, China.

The library has moved to a new building in Zhujiang New Town, which fully opened on 23 June 2013. The old building in Zhongshan Road has been closed since 1 April 2013.

== Introduction ==
The Guangzhou Library, established by the Guangzhou Municipal Government (GMG), was created for the benefit of the public's welfare, and to serve as a cultural and educational institution. The library's services are based on collecting, organizing, and housing all categories of written knowledge and information including paper-based materials, audio-visual materials, and digital materials. The library offers lending materials, reference and information services, exhibitions and lectures, art appreciation, cultural exhibits, Internet services, public education services, research, and spaces for communication.

The new Guangzhou Library is situated on the banks of the Pearl River on Flower City Square and on Guangzhou's new central axis. The square is the GMG's effort to create a city "living room". The library is the "cultural window" of the city's "living room". The new library uses "Beautiful Books" as the design concept, and the placement of the structure is based on the city's new central axis. Taken from east to west, the design of the north and south towers bears a resemblance to the Chinese character "之". The cascading style of the "books" on the exterior is representative of the overlap of history and culture. At the same time, the design integrates the typical architectural concept of arcade, and embodies elements of Lingnan art.

The new Guangzhou Library covers a gross area of 100 thousand square meters and holds 8.43 million collection. It provides four thousand seats and 500 computers for readers to use. There are four thousand Internet nodes and the wifi service is available in the whole building. Services provided include the lending and housing of materials and reference services.

The Digital New Library

- surface area: 100,000 square meters
- collection: 8.43 million volume
- seats: 4,000
- public use computers: 500
- wired Internet connections: 4,000
- wireless coverage area: 100%

Traditional collection

- volumes 3.2 million
- children's books 356,000
- rare books 6,793
- Braille books 3,617
- A-V materials 451,000
- bound newspapers & periodicals 139,000
- newspapers & periodicals 4,743

Digital resources

- e-books: 425,000
- e-magazines: 18,000
- e-newspapers: 565
- dissertations: 1.89 million
- conference papers: 3.77 million
- multimedia (audio-visual): 43,000

== History ==
In 1927, Lin Yungai, a former mayor of Guangzhou, proposed setting up the Municipal Zhongshan Library to commemorate Sun Yat-sen ("Zhongshan" being his given name in Chinese) and to promote the cultural development. The Municipal Executive Council later approved of its planning and establishment. In the same year, fund-raising commissioners were sent to the United States, Cuba, Canada and Mexico and received a lot of donations from the overseas Chinese.

In 1928, the Preparatory Committee for the Construction of the Municipal Zhongshan Library was established, with sixteen members, including Lin Yungai and [[Du Dingyou|Du Dingyou (杜定友; 1898–1967)]] (a renowned librarian in modern China).

In 1929, construction of the Municipal Zhongshan Library commenced at site of the original Cantonese Confucius Temple on Wende Road.

On 15 October 1933, the Municipal Zhongshan Library was completed and opened, with Wu Zhimei as the first chief librarian.

In 1934, the provincial library was abolished and its collection of 33,500 books was handed over by the municipal library.

In 1938, the Municipal Zhongshan Library was suspended after Guangzhou was occupied by the Japanese. Du Dingyou worked to save about 300,000 volumes of the library's collection from destruction.

In 1945, as China won in the war against Japanese invasion, Du Dingyou served concurrently as director of the Preparatory Office for the Re-establishment of the Municipal Zhongshan Library.

In 1949, the organization was renamed as the Guangzhou Municipal Zhongshan Library.

It was later renamed as the Guangzhou Zhongshan Library after the liberation of Guangzhou.

In 1955, the provincial and the municipal libraries were merged to form a new one – the Sun Yat-sen Library of Guangdong Province. The site of the original Guangzhou Municipal Zhongshan Library became the North Wing of the Sun Yat-sen Library of Guangdong Province, also known as the Sun Yat-sen Literature Museum.

In December 1980, the CPC Committee of Guangzhou decided during an office meeting to establish the Guangzhou Library.

In January 1981, the Guangzhou Municipal Bureau of Culture announced the establishment of the related Preparatory Committee and the decision to transform a revolutionary museum into the Guangzhou Library.

On 2 January 1982, the opening ceremony of Guangzhou Library was held.

In October 2004, the Guangzhou Development Planning Committee of Guangzhou formally approved of constructing the new premise of the Guangzhou Library.

From October 2004 to January 2005, the Guangzhou Library organized an international invitational tournament to solicit the best design proposal for its new premise.

On 20 February 2006, a foundation-laying ceremony was held for the new premise of the Guangzhou Library.

On 28 December 2012, part of the new premise of the Guangzhou Library was officially opened.

On 23 June 2013, the new library was completely opened.

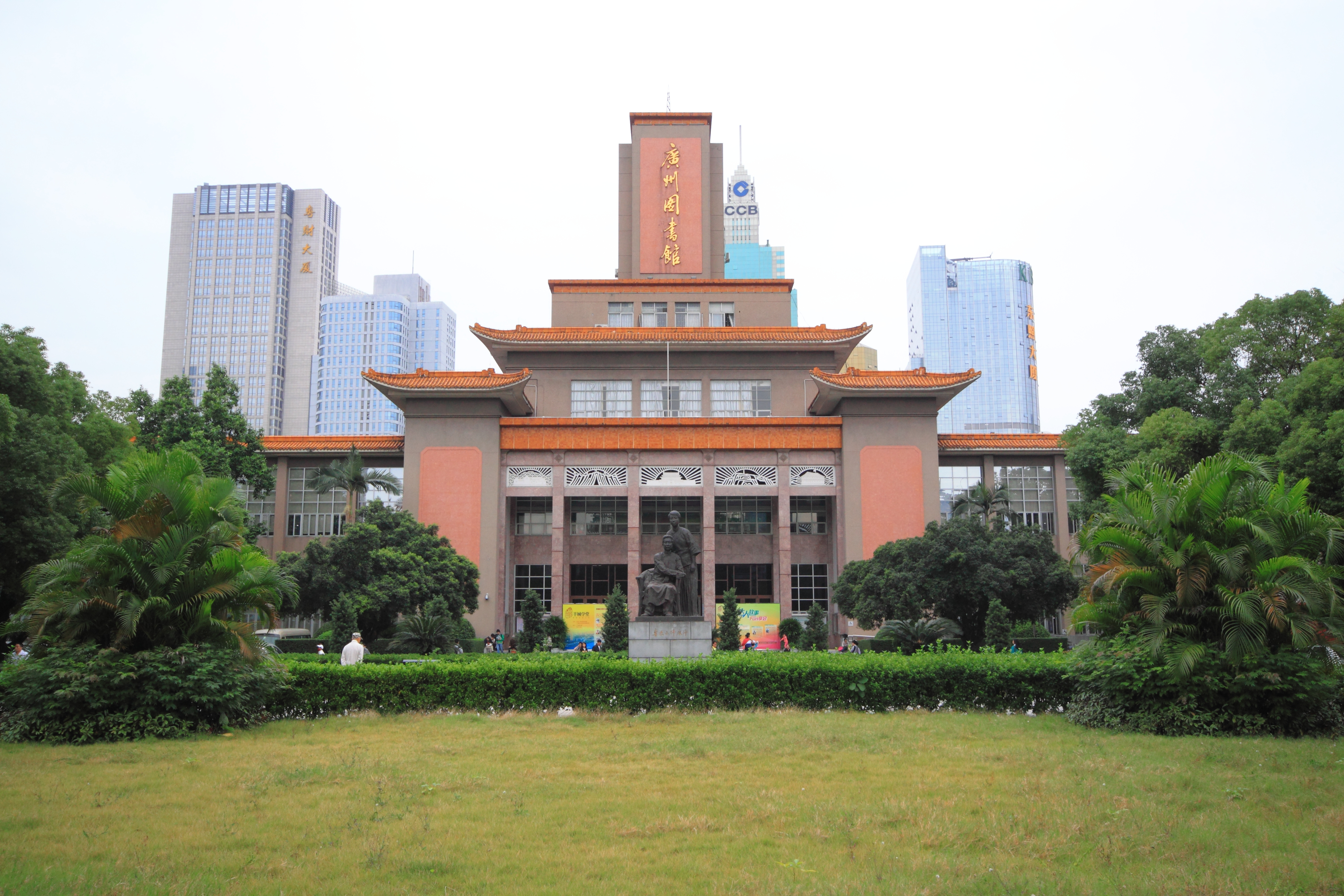
Old Guangzhou Library building in Zhongshan Road

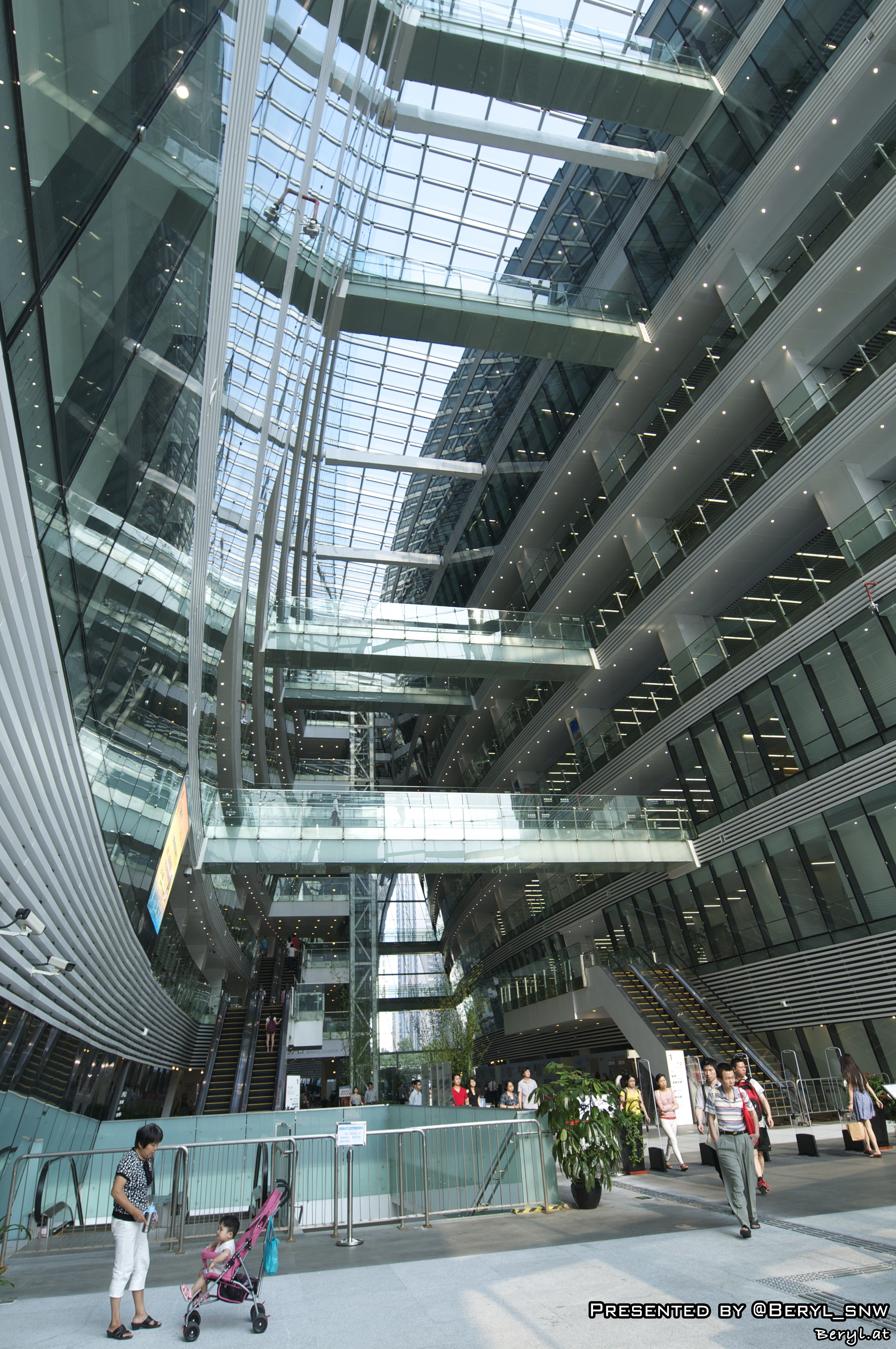
Inside the new Guangzhou Library building in Zhujiang New Town

== See also ==
- National first-class library
- Sun Yat-sen Library of Guangdong Province
- List of libraries in China
