= Sun Yat-sen Library of Guangdong Province =

Library in Guangzhou, China

- 广东省立中山图书馆
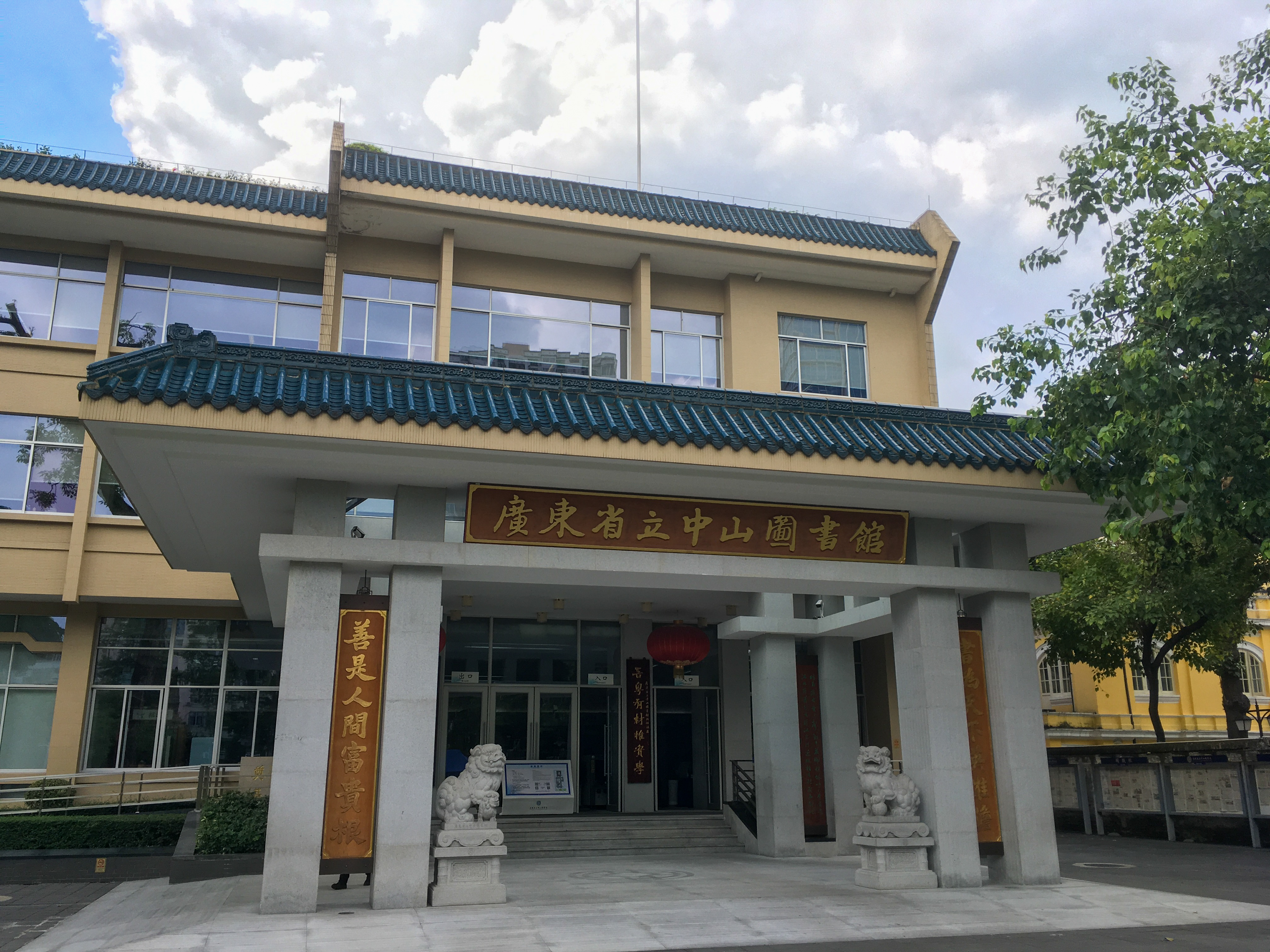
- 23.1269°N 113.2711°E
- Location: China
- Type: public library
- Established: 1912

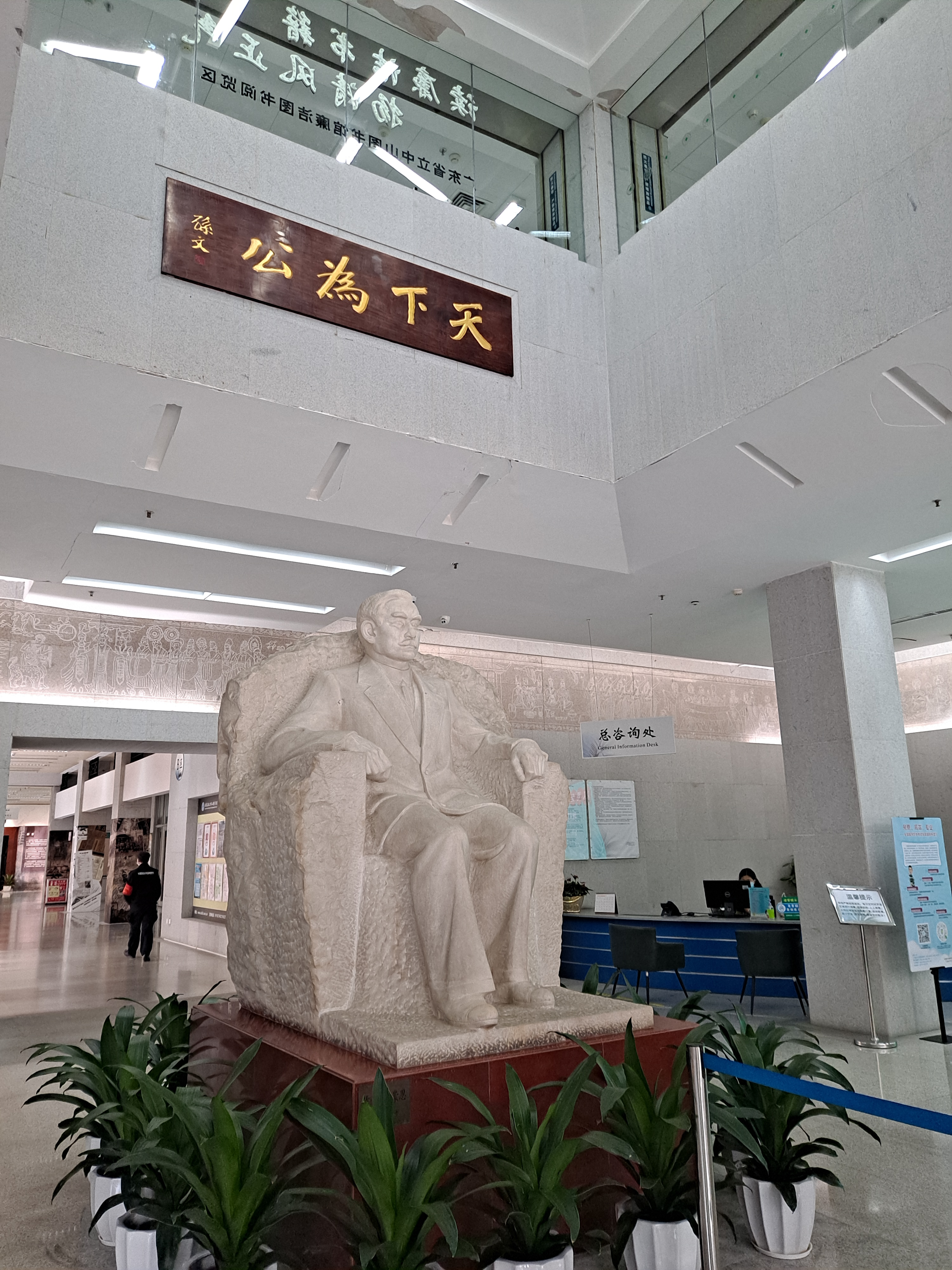
Statue of Sun Yat-sen in Sun Yat-sen Library of Guangdong Province

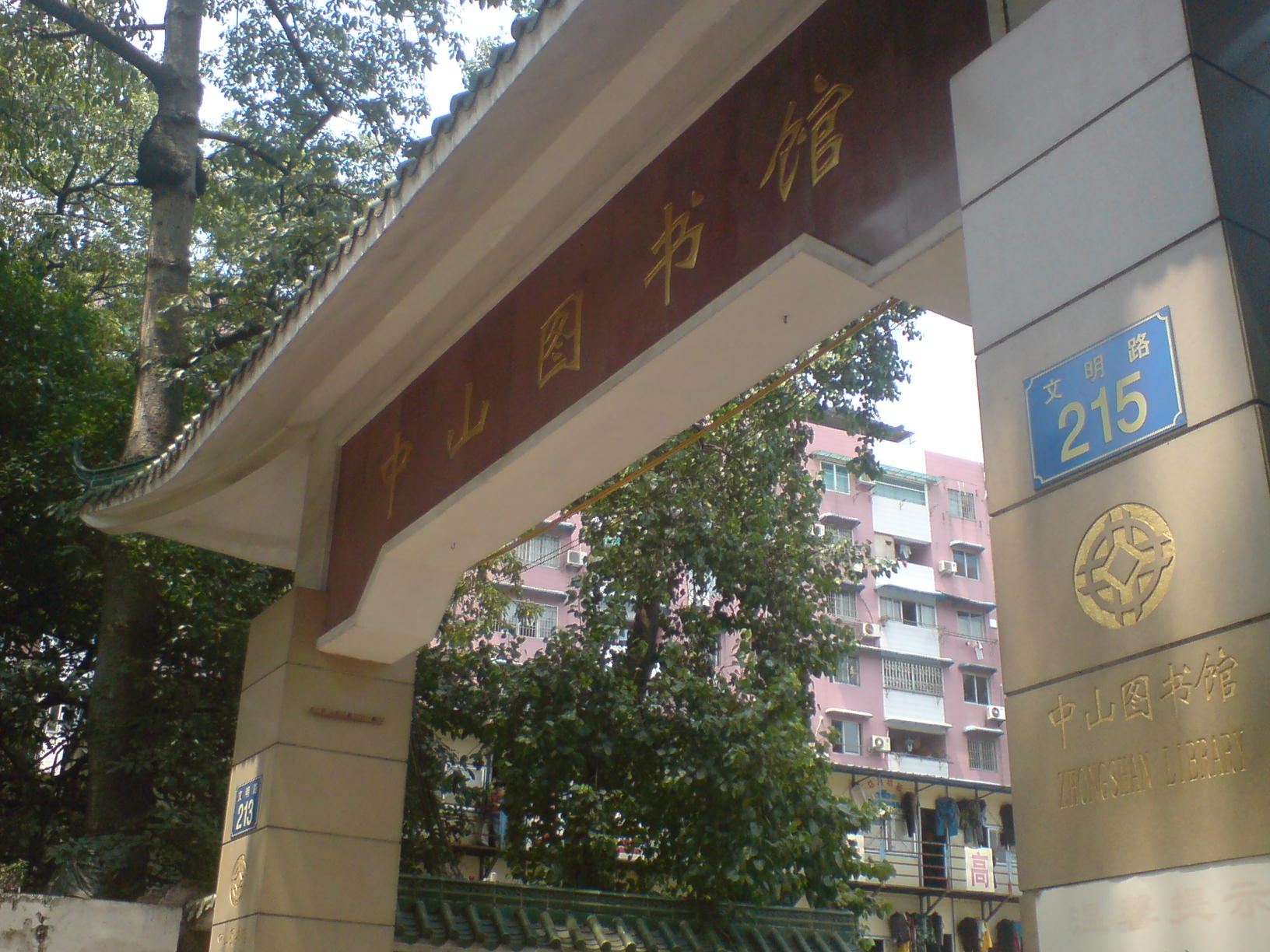
The archway of the Sun Yat-sen Main Library on Wenming Road (dismantled)

Sun Yat-sen Library of Guangdong Province (simplified Chinese: 广东省立中山图书馆; traditional Chinese: 廣東省立中山圖書館; pinyin: Guǎngdōng Shěnglì Zhōngshān Túshūguǎn), also called "Guangdong Provincial Zhongshan Library" (Note: "Sun Yat-sen" and "Sun Zhongshan" are names of the same person.) or "Guangdong Provincial Ancient Books Protection Center", is the provincial library of Guangdong in south China, and located at its capital city of Guangzhou. The library was established in 1912 and has developed into a large comprehensive public library, a national first-class library, and a "National Civilized Library". The library is opened to foreigners as well.

== History ==
The predecessor of Sun Yat-sen Library of Guangdong Province was "Nanyuan" (南園), a famous scenic spot in Guangzhou established by scholars during the Ming Dynasty.

The more recent predecessor was the "Book Collection Building of Guangya Bookstore" (廣雅書局藏書樓) in the late Qing Dynasty (now the Sun Yat-sen Literature Library).

The library was formally founded in the first year of the Republic of China (1912) and was originally named "Guangdong Provincial Library".

In 1919, Liang Dingfen's descendants donated more than 600 cabinets of books, totaling more than 20,000 volumes, to the Guangdong Provincial Library in accordance with his will. This was the first batch of privately donated books received by the library, and the number was twice the total collection of the provincial library at that time.

In 1950, after the founding of the People's Republic of China, the library was renamed "Guangdong People's Library".

In 1955, Guangdong People's Library and Guangzhou Municipal Zhongshan Library merged and were renamed "Guangdong Provincial Library".

In 1986, the library moved to the new building at No. 213 Wenming Road.

In 2002, the library was renamed the "Sun Yat-sen Library of Guangdong Province", in memory of Dr. Sun Yat-sen or Sun Zhongshan.

On December 10, 2006, the Guangdong Provincial Government approved the expansion project of Sun Yat-sen Library of Guangdong Province with an investment of RMB 500 million and officially started construction. According to the plan, the first phase of the project would cover the location of the provincial library, and the second phase would be the former site of Guangdong Provincial Museum, which was to move to its new building in Zhujiang New Town.

The first phase of the renovation and expansion project, which lasted five years and was a major project of the 11th Five-Year Plan, was completed in 2010. The library held a completion and opening ceremony on December 31, 2010.

The second phase of the project, built on the former site of the Guangdong Provincial Museum, was completed in 2019.

On June 18, 2023, the theme library was opened for service.

In 2025, Sun Yat-sen Library of Guangdong Province was selected into the List of National Ancient Book Restoration Centers.

== Branches ==
Currently, the Sun Yat-sen Library of Guangdong Province is composed of the Wenming Road Main Library and five branch libraries.

- The Wenming Road Main Library is located at No. 213, Wenming Road, Yuexiu District, Guangzhou; adjacent to the former site of the First National Congress of the Kuomintang to the east. It covers an area of 53,900 square meters and the old building is 3 stories high.
- The Wende Road Branch Library was built in 1933 and is a key cultural relic protection unit in Guangzhou. It is now the Children's Section of the library; Address: No. 81, Wende North Road, Guangzhou.
- The Guihua Branch is located at the Guihuagang Campus of Guangzhou University and is also the Guihua Branch of the Guangzhou University Library.
- The Dafo Temple Branch Library was established on June 2, 2008, based on the Guangzhou Dafo Temple Library.
- The Longmen Branch was established on March 25, 2007. It is located in Longmen County, Huizhou City, Guangdong Province. It was renovated on the basis of the Longmen County Library through cooperation between Zhongshan Library and Citigroup. It is also the Citigroup Longmen Children's Library.
- The Liuzu Branch Library was founded on February 11, 2007. It is located in Liuzu Town, Xinxing County, Yunfu City, Guangdong Province. It was jointly established by the Sun Yat-sen Library and Citigroup. It is also the Liuzu Children's Library of Citigroup.

== Main Responsibilities ==
Sun Yat-sen Library of Guangdong Province is under the direct leadership of Guangdong Provincial Department of Culture and Tourism. The main responsibilities are:

- Provide document information services for the economic development, scientific research and other construction projects in the Guangdong region,
- Provide reading materials and venues for the masses; collect, organize and preserve cultural classics and local documents,
- Conduct research on library theories and technical methods,
- Undertake the daily work of Guangdong Provincial Central Library Committee,
- Formulate the overall plan for the protection of ancient books in the province, technical standards and work specifications for the rescue and protection of ancient books,
- Organize and implement the provincial ancient book collection, protection status survey and related reporting work,
- Assist in establishing the Joint Catalogue of Chinese Ancient Books, the National Catalogue of Precious Ancient Books and the Ancient Books Digital Resource Library,
- Guide the cities and counties to carry out ancient book protection work.

== Collection Resources ==
By the end of 2024, the total collection of the Library reached about 9.83 million volumes; the total number of registered readers is about 1.37 million. The annual circulation of documents is about 2.11 million volumes, the average number of readers served per day is more than 10,000.

The library has a collection of more than 100,000 types of Guangdong local documents in more than 400,000 volumes, including Guangdong local chronicles, family genealogies, Guangdong historical materials, Guangdong writings, Sun Yat-sen documents, newspapers, periodicals, maps, etc. It is the largest Guangdong local document center in China.

The intelligent book collection and sorting system launched in 2020 became the first technological innovation in the global library industry led by China.

== See also ==
- Sun Yat-sen Memorial Library
- National first-class library
- Guangzhou Library
- National Library of China
- List of libraries in China
