= Haizhou Emperor Guan Temple =

Taoist temple in Shanxi Province, China

Haizhou Guandi Temple
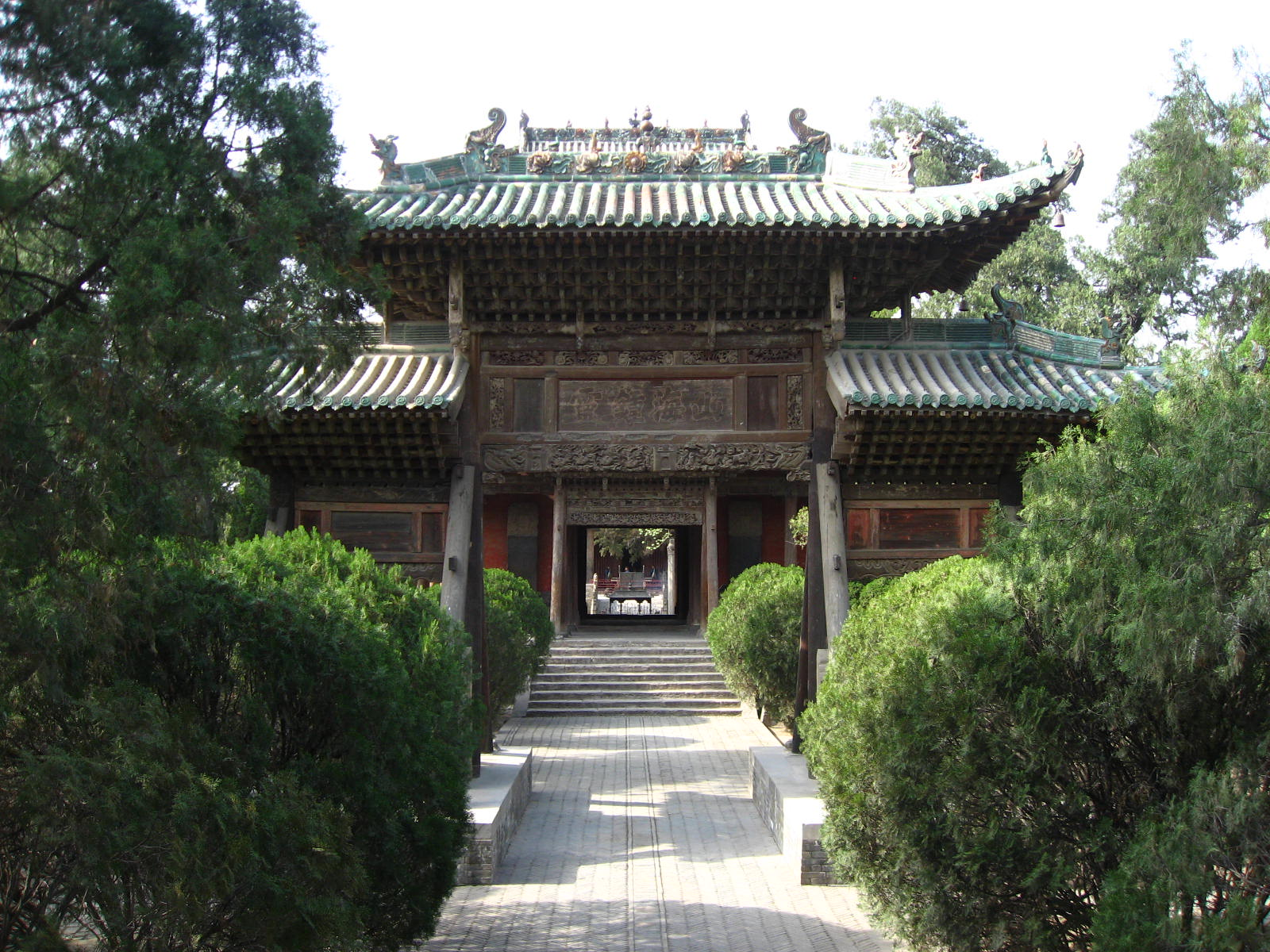

Religion
- Affiliation: Taoism

Location
- Location: Haizhou, Yuncheng, Shanxi
- Country: China
- Interactive map of Haizhou Guandi Temple

Architecture
- Established: 589

Haizhou Emperor Guan Temple (simplified Chinese: 解州关帝庙; traditional Chinese: 解州關帝廟), or Haizhou Guandi Temple, is a temple located in Haizhou Town, Yanhu District, Yuncheng City, Shanxi Province. It is hailed as "the grand ancestor of temples dedicated to Guan Yu" (关庙之祖). The Temple is the largest extant palace-style Taoist complex and martial temple in China.

Haizhou Emperor Guan Temple is the largest Emperor Guan Temple (关帝庙) in China. It has a total area of 220,000 square meters, with more than 200 rooms.

== History ==
Haizhou Emperor Guan Temple was established in the ninth year of Kaihuang (开皇) during the Sui dynasty (589), expanded and rebuilt during the Song dynasty and Ming dynasty.

Haizhou Emperor Guan Temple was destroyed by fire in the forty-first year of Kangxi (1702) during the Qing dynasty and was restored after more than ten years.

== Conservations ==
In 1957, Haizhou Emperor Guan Temple was designated by the Shanxi Provincial People's Government as the first batch of provincial-level key cultural relics protection units in Shanxi Province.

In 1988, Haizhou Emperor Guan Temple was listed as a Major Historical and Cultural Site Protected at the National Level in China.

== Gallery ==
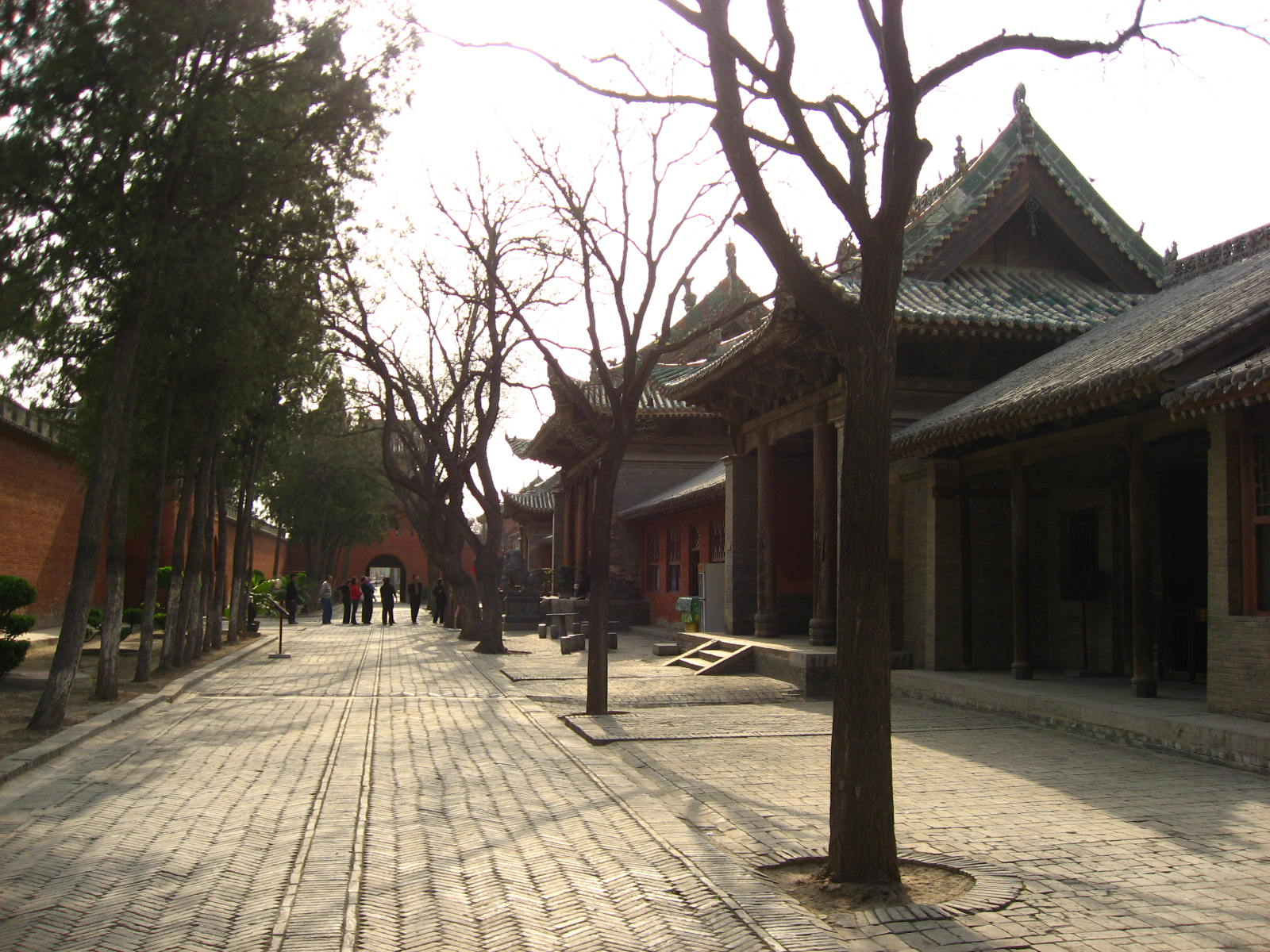

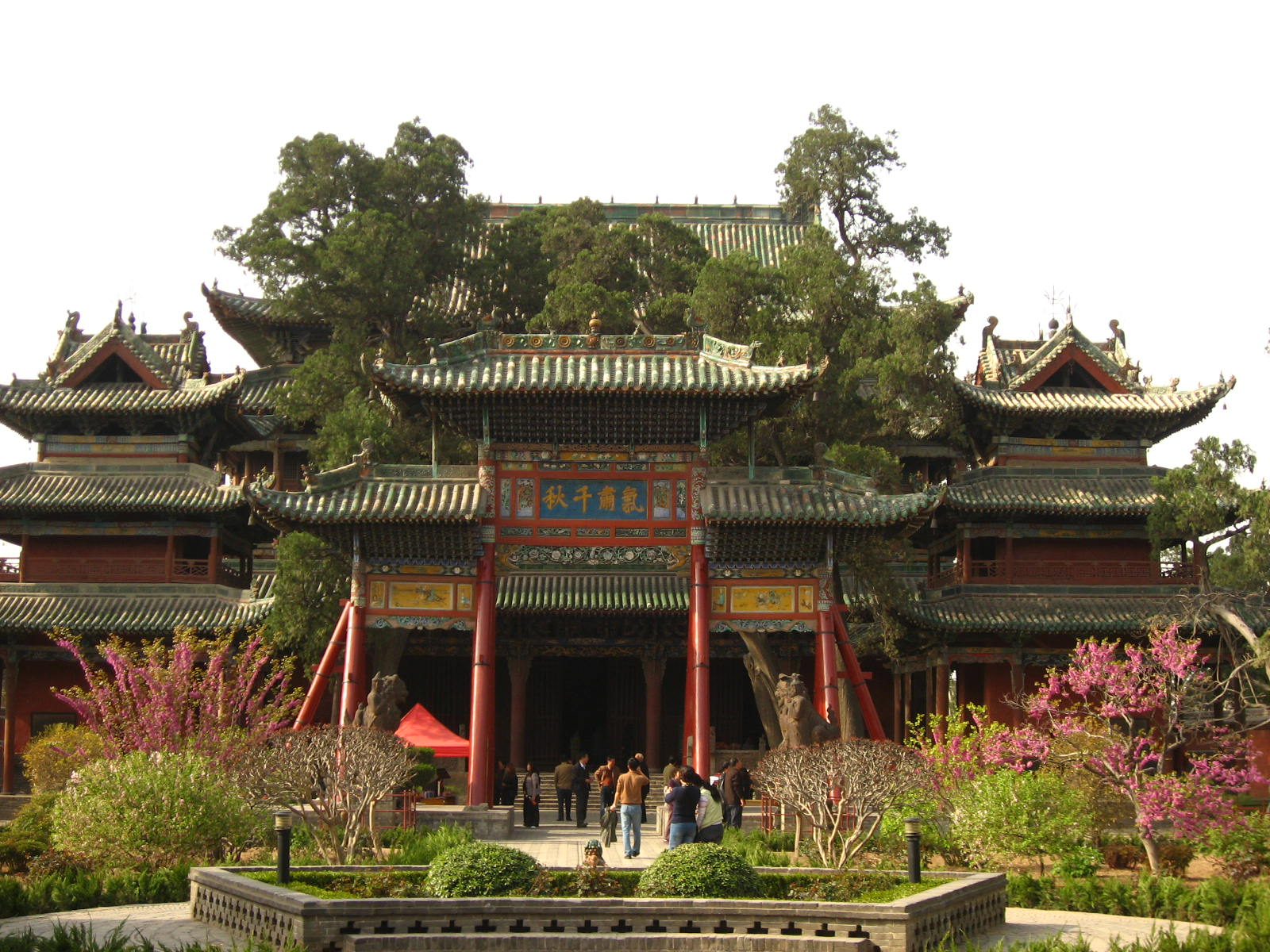
