= Kuala Lumpur Guan Di Temple =

Taoist temple in Kuala Lumpur, Malaysia

- 吉隆坡关帝庙
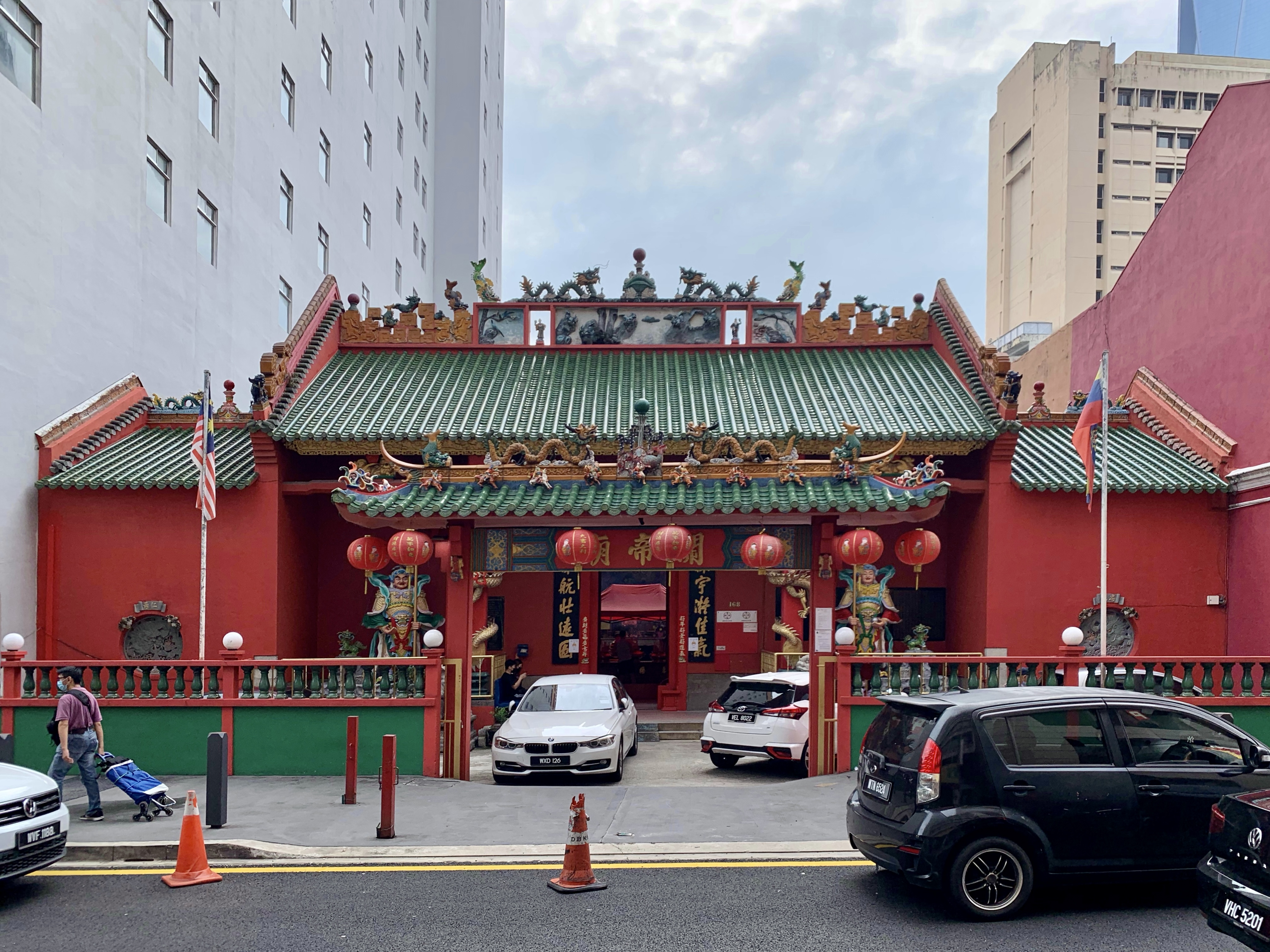
- Exterior front of the temple, 2022

Religion
- Affiliation: Taoism
- Deity: Guan Yu
- Ownership: Selangor and Federal Territory Kwong Siew Association

Location
- Location: Kuala Lumpur
- Country: Malaysia
- Interactive map of Kuala Lumpur Guan Di Temple
- Coordinates: 3°08′38″N 101°41′49″E

Architecture
- Type: Lingnan
- Completed: 1887

Website
- https://kwongsiew.org/category/guan-ti-temple

Kuala Lumpur Guan Di Temple (shortened as KL Guan Di Temple, Chinese: 吉隆坡关帝庙), or Kuala Lumpur Emperor Guan Temple, also known as the Kuala Lumpur Kuan Ti Temple, is a Malaysia-based Taoist temple located in the Jalan Tun H S Lee, Kuala Lumpur. Founded in 1887 or 1888, it is one of the oldest temples in Malaysia.

== History ==
The Guan Di Temple in Kuala Lumpur was founded in 1887, during the 14th year of the Guangxu Emperor's reign, under the initiative of the Selangor and Federal Territory Kwong Siew Association. Conceived as one of the association's community assets, the shrine was dedicated to Guan Sheng Dijun, also known as Guan Yu. This dedication led the public to refer to the site simply as the "Guan Di Temple." The project was championed by prominent figures of the association, including Zhao Yu and Wang Chunlin, who both proposed the idea and contributed the land on which the temple was built.

From the late 1800s through the early 1900s, the temple functioned not only as a religious sanctuary but also as a communal forum. It became a recognized place where disputes among the Kwong Siew community could be resolved. The ethical principles associated with Guan Di， particularly loyalty and integrity were invoked in matters of trade and family life, giving the temple a key role in sustaining local order and cohesion. In the decades that followed, the temple also became a center for charitable drives, with donations directed toward disaster relief efforts throughout Malaya.

During the Japanese occupation in World War II, temple activities were restricted to small-scale rituals. After the war, however, the association reactivated the site by organizing religious festivals and reviving its educational role. As Kuala Lumpur modernized during the second half of the 20th century, the temple was increasingly recognized as a heritage landmark along Petaling Street, attracting both residents and tourists seeking insight into the city's history. Meanwhile, the Kwong Siew Free School remained active, offering Mandarin language classes and instruction in Chinese customs, and today is regarded as the last free school of its kind in Kuala Lumpur.

In the 21st century, the temple continues to attract large numbers of worshippers and visitors. Every year, on the 24th day of the sixth month of the lunar calendar, a major festival is held in honor of Guan Sheng Dijun. The event draws thousands of devotees and tourists alike. In recent heritage tourism efforts, the Guan Di Temple is frequently highlighted alongside the Sri Mahamariamman Temple, Kuala Lumpur and the Sin Sze Si Ya Temple as part of the historic walking routes through Kuala Lumpur's old city quarter.

== Architecture ==
The temple's construction follows the traditional Lingnan architectural style, with red walls and roofs tiled in green. Its ridges are adorned with porcelain shard decorations (jian ci) and ceramic figurines depicting legendary characters.

At the main entrance, a pair of stone lions stand guard, while a gilded signboard inscribed with “關帝廟” (“Guan Di Temple”) in Traditional Chinese hangs above the gate. Dragon-carved columns support the front veranda, and on both sides of the doorway are paintings of the Door Gods (Menshen). The temple's layout centers around an open courtyard (tianjing) and the main hall, where incense spirals are often seen burning and releasing smoke overhead.

The primary altar houses a wooden statue of Guan Di (Guan Yu), flanked by effigies of Guan Ping and Zhou Cang. The temple also safeguards its most treasured relic, the Green Dragon Crescent Blade (Qinglong Yan Yue Dao), a bronze weapon believed by legend to weigh around 59 kilograms. Dating back to the Qing dynasty, this artifact is revered as the temple's most sacred possession.

During festive occasions, devotees are permitted to touch the Guan Dao, as many believe it brings courage, wards off evil spirits, and changes one's fortune.

Most of the building materials including timber, bricks, tiles, and stone carvings were imported from Guangdong. These were first shipped to Singapore and later transported to Kuala Lumpur, where Chinese migrants collectively assembled the temple through community fund-raising and volunteer labor. The interior preserves a wealth of stone carvings, poetic couplets (yinglian), and inscribed plaques, all reinforcing themes of loyalty, righteousness, and valor.

== Rituals and Festivals ==
The temple's most significant annual celebration is the “Birthday of Guan Di” (关帝千秋), which falls on the 24th day of the sixth lunar month. On this occasion, large-scale religious rituals such as jiao dian and li dou are conducted.

Another important observance is the birthday of Guan Ping, commemorated on the 13th day of the fifth lunar month (关平诞).

Throughout major festivals such as Chinese New Year, Chap Goh Meh, and the Mid-Autumn Festival, additional ceremonies are conducted. The temple also offers year-round services including Tai Sui blessings, lamp-lighting, and divination practices such as kau chim.

Between the first and fifteenth days of the chinese calendar, devotees may take part in the “Grasping the Guan Dao” ritual (握关刀). Devotees lift or touch the 59-kilogram weapon, a practice believed to banish misfortune while inviting prosperity and blessings.

The temple also supports the practice of kau chim divination, where worshippers shake a bamboo cylinder filled with fortune sticks until one falls out. The corresponding text provides guidance on matters such as health, luck, wealth, or life decisions, often localized with cultural interpretations.

== Gallery ==
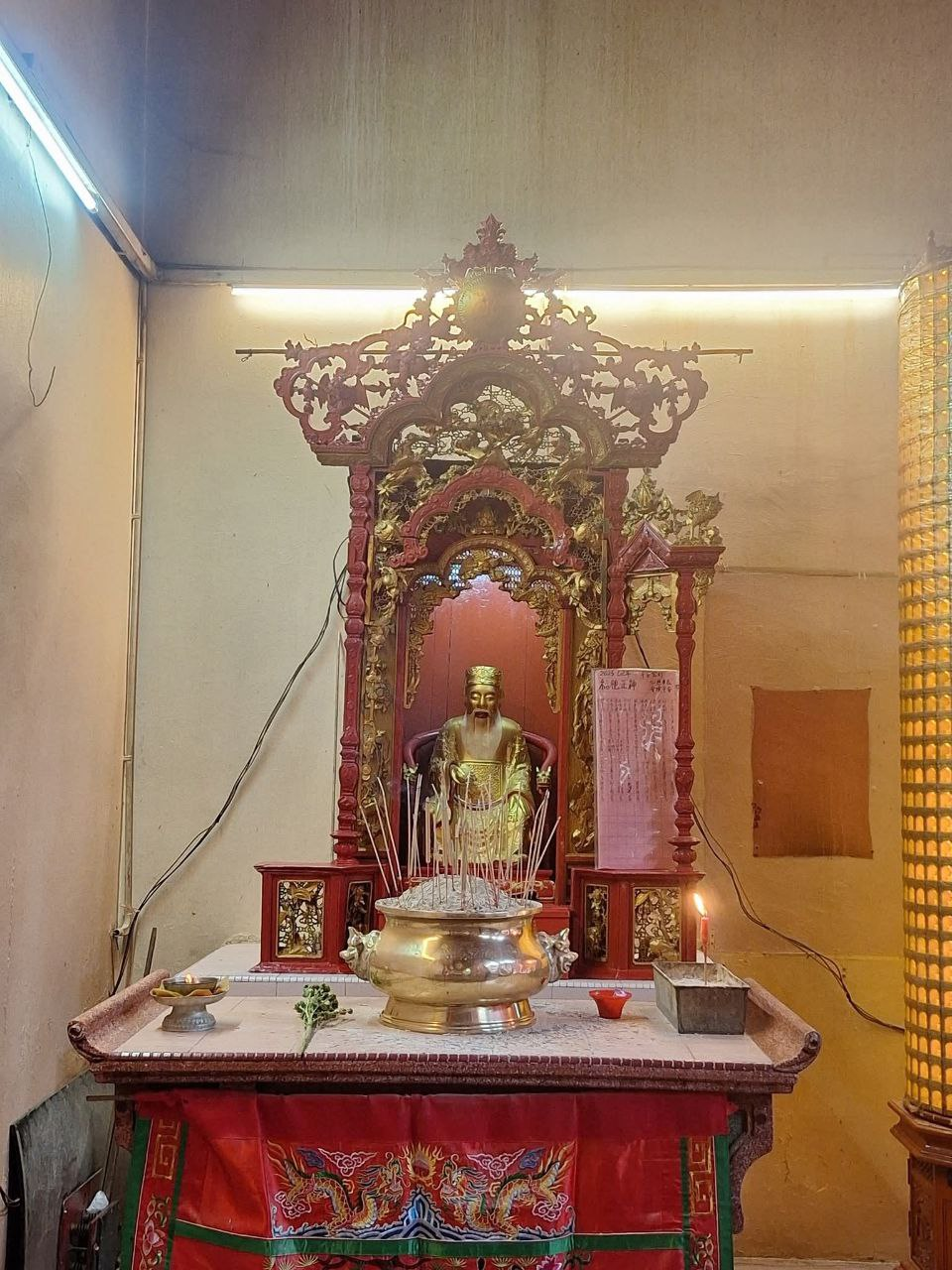
Statue of Tua Pek Kong

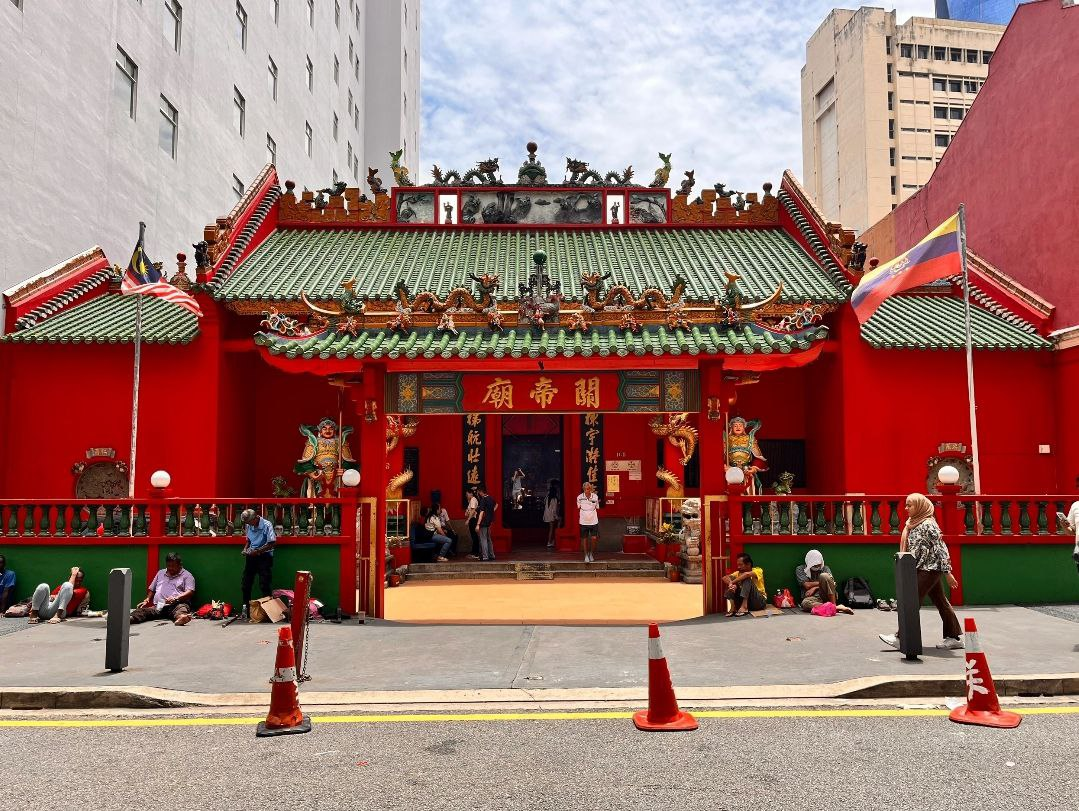
Front view of the Guan Di Temple

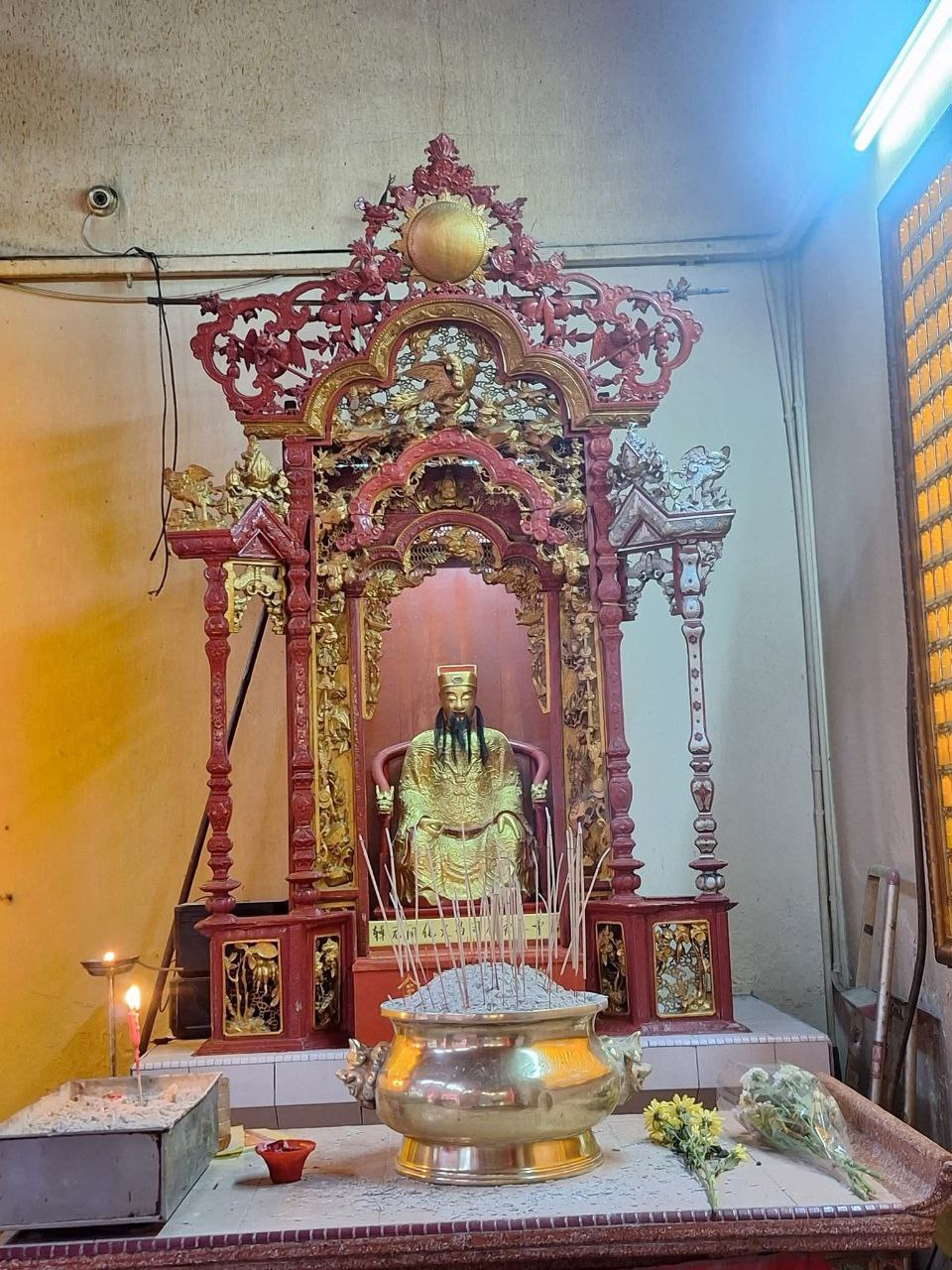
Statue of Wenchang Dijun

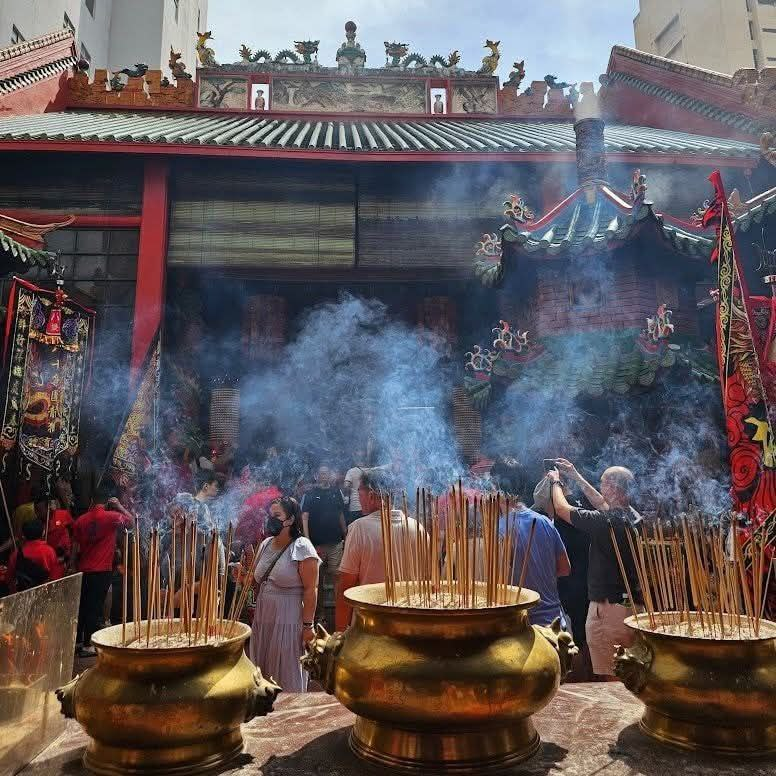
Temple incense burner

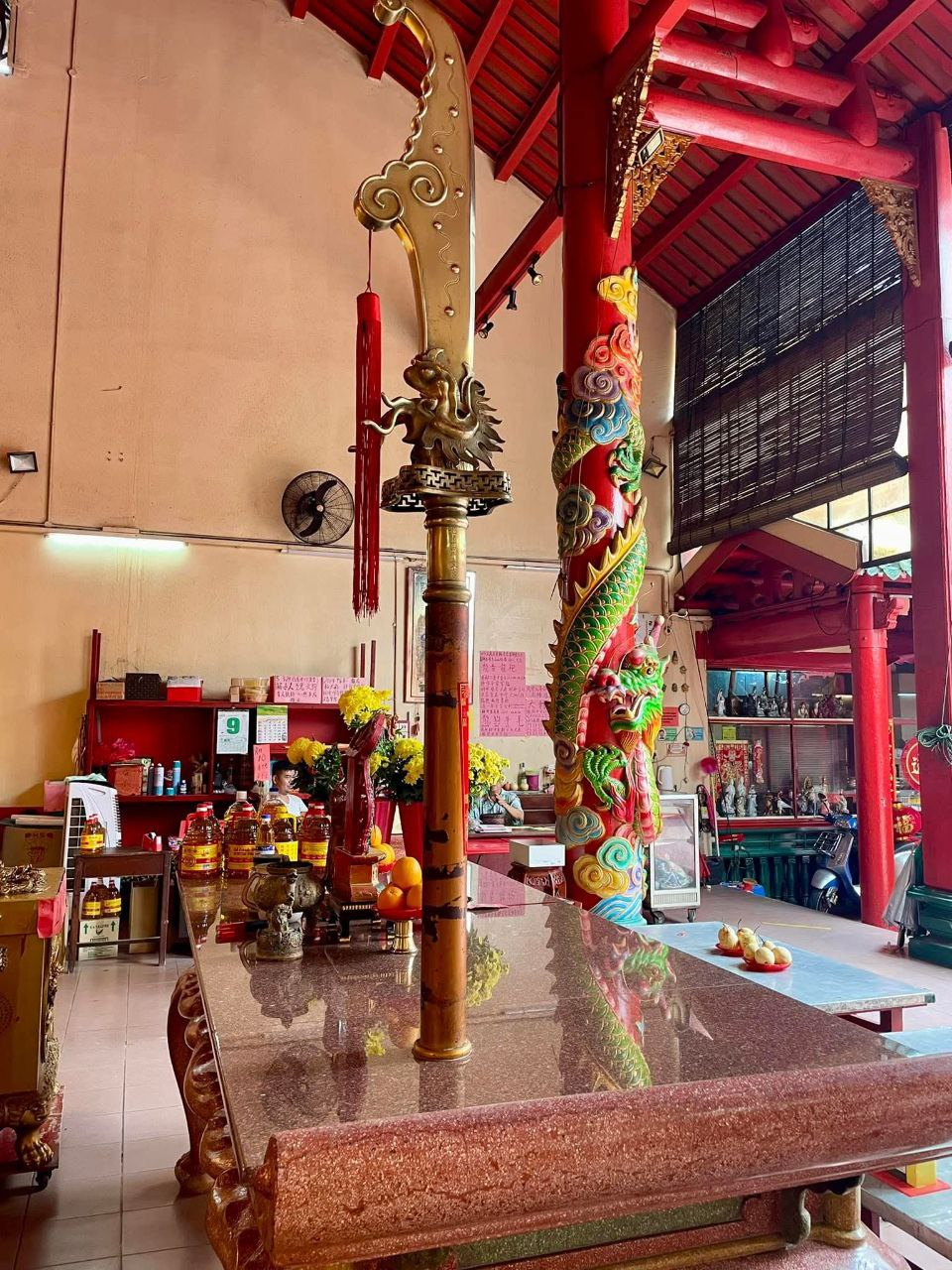
Guan Yu's weapon (Guan Dao)

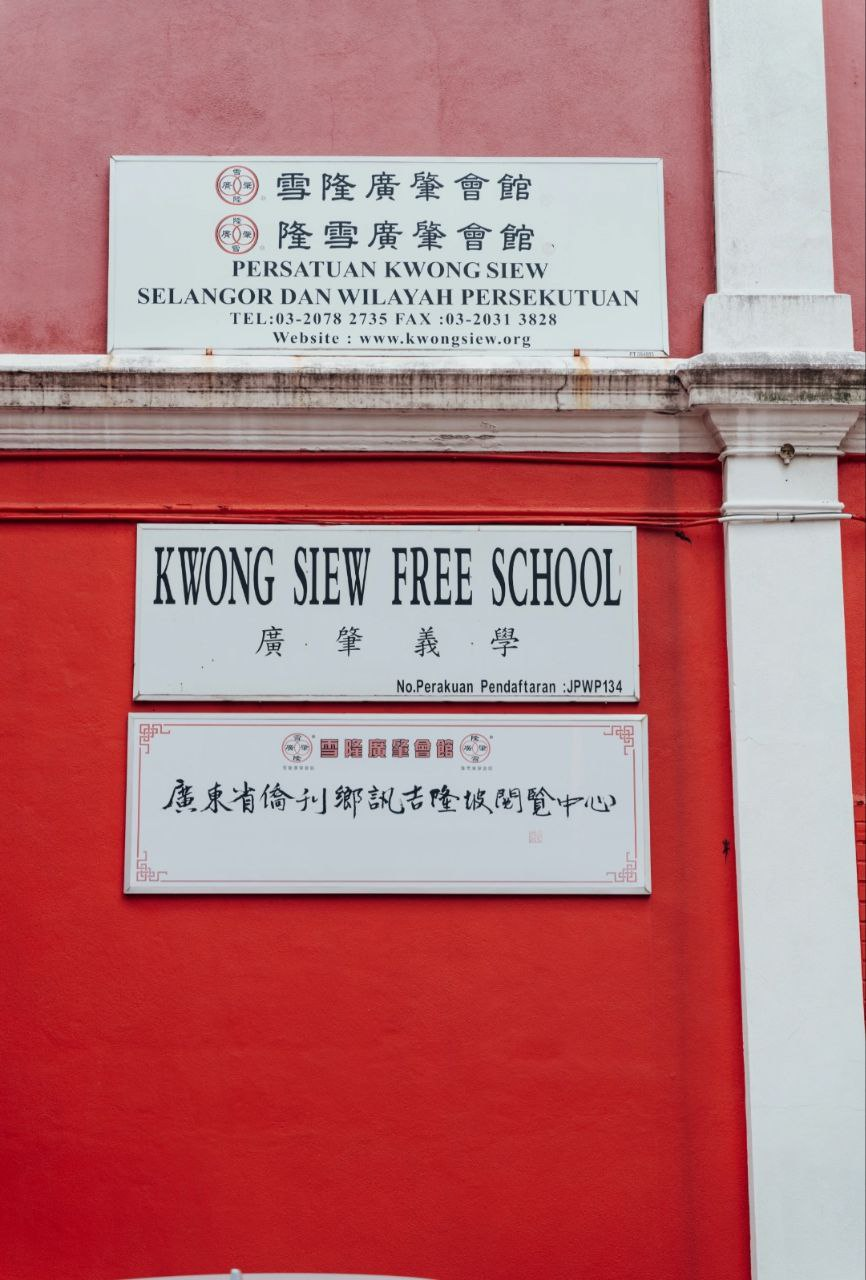
Kwong Siew Free School

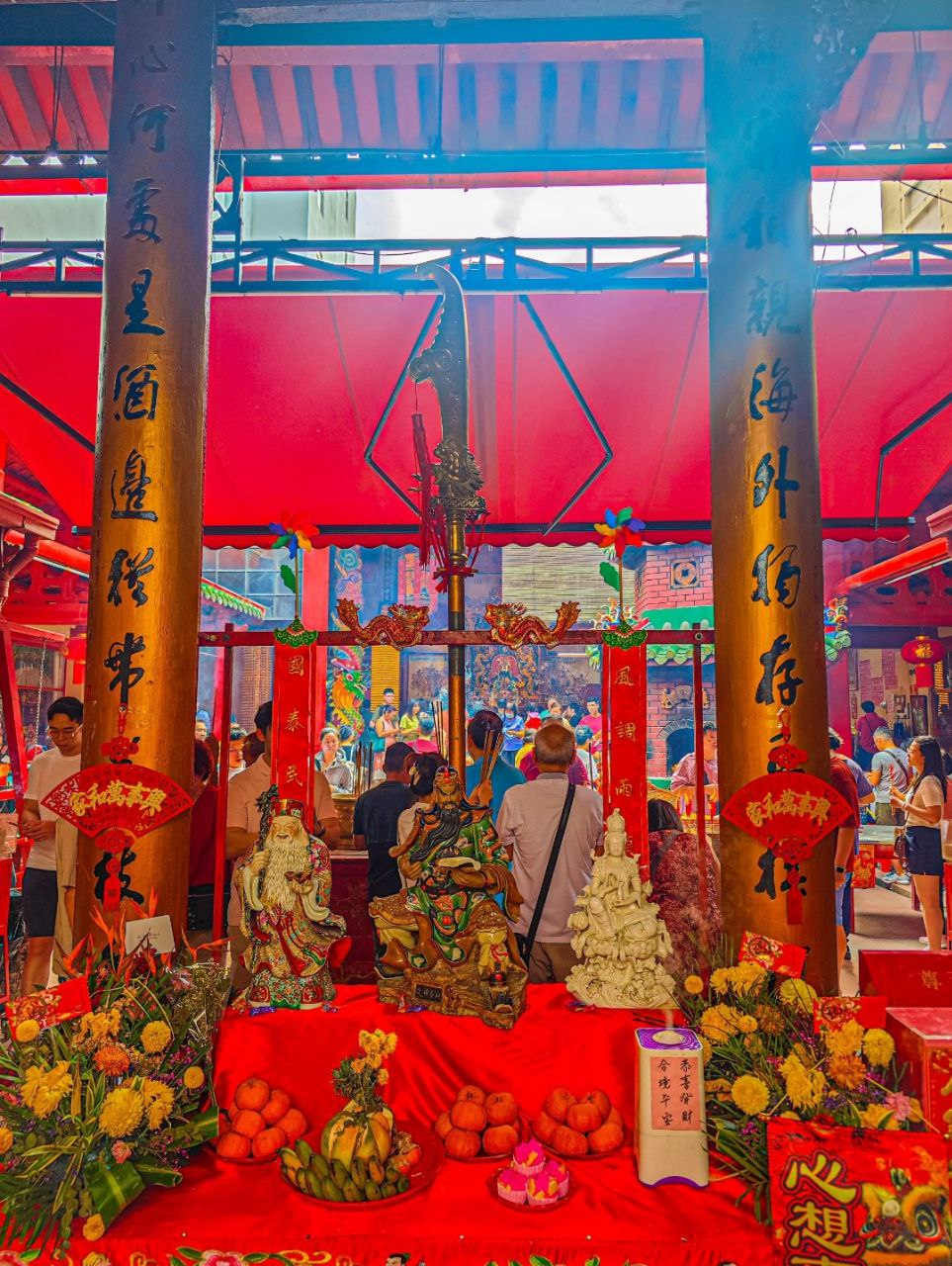
Green Dragon Crescent Blade (青龙偃月刀)

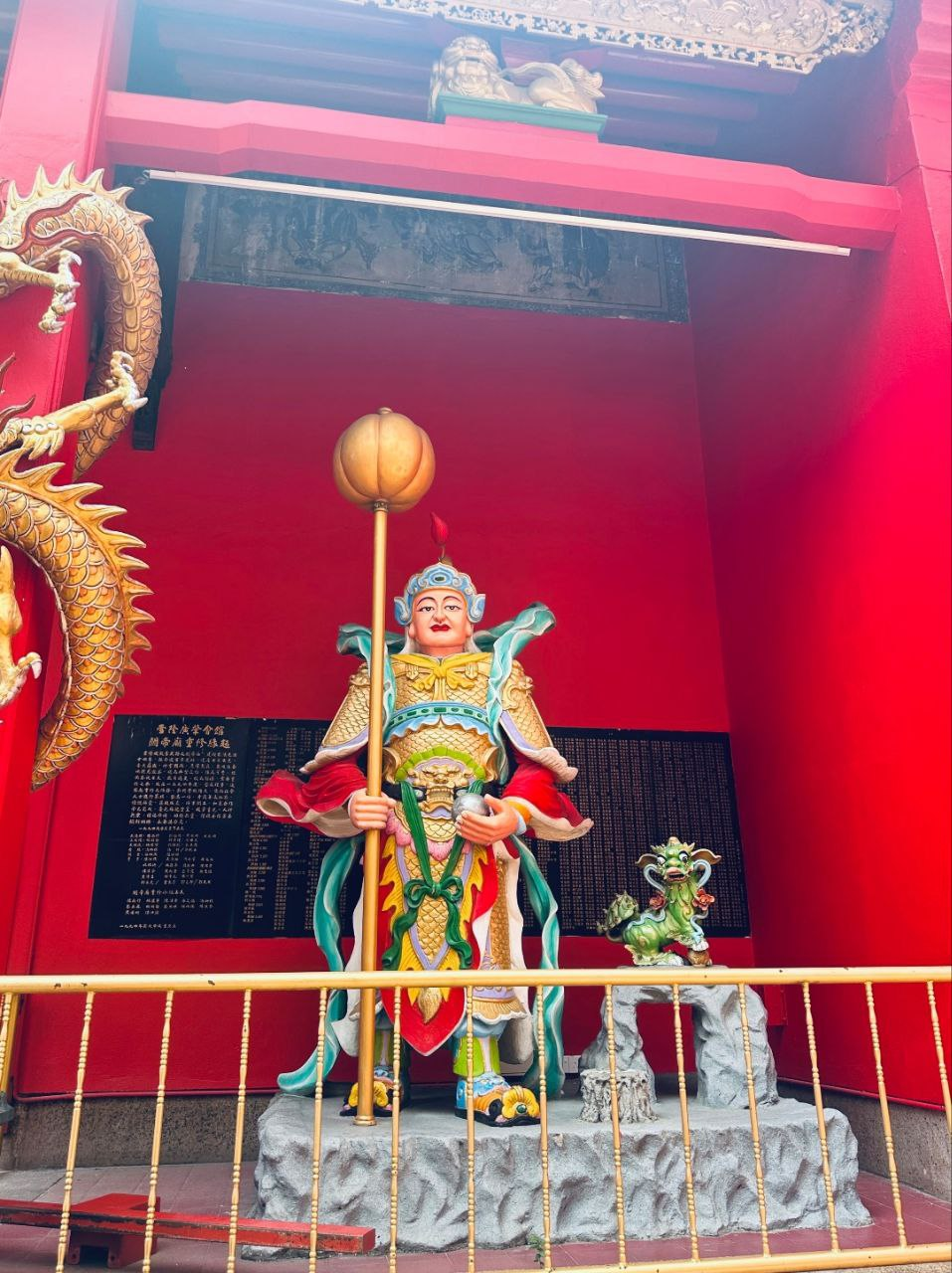
Right-side Door God (Men Shen)

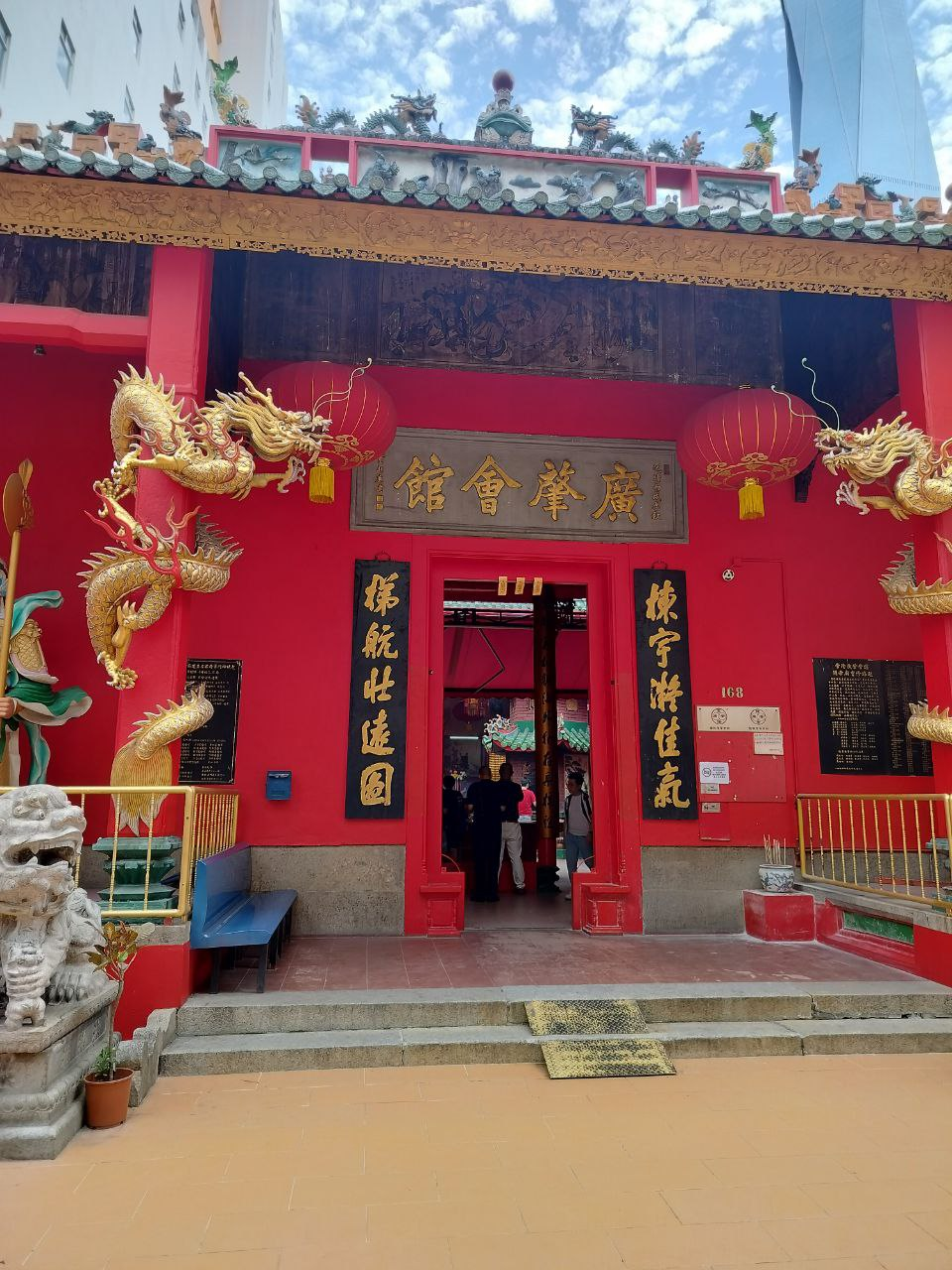
Main entrance of the Guan Di Temple

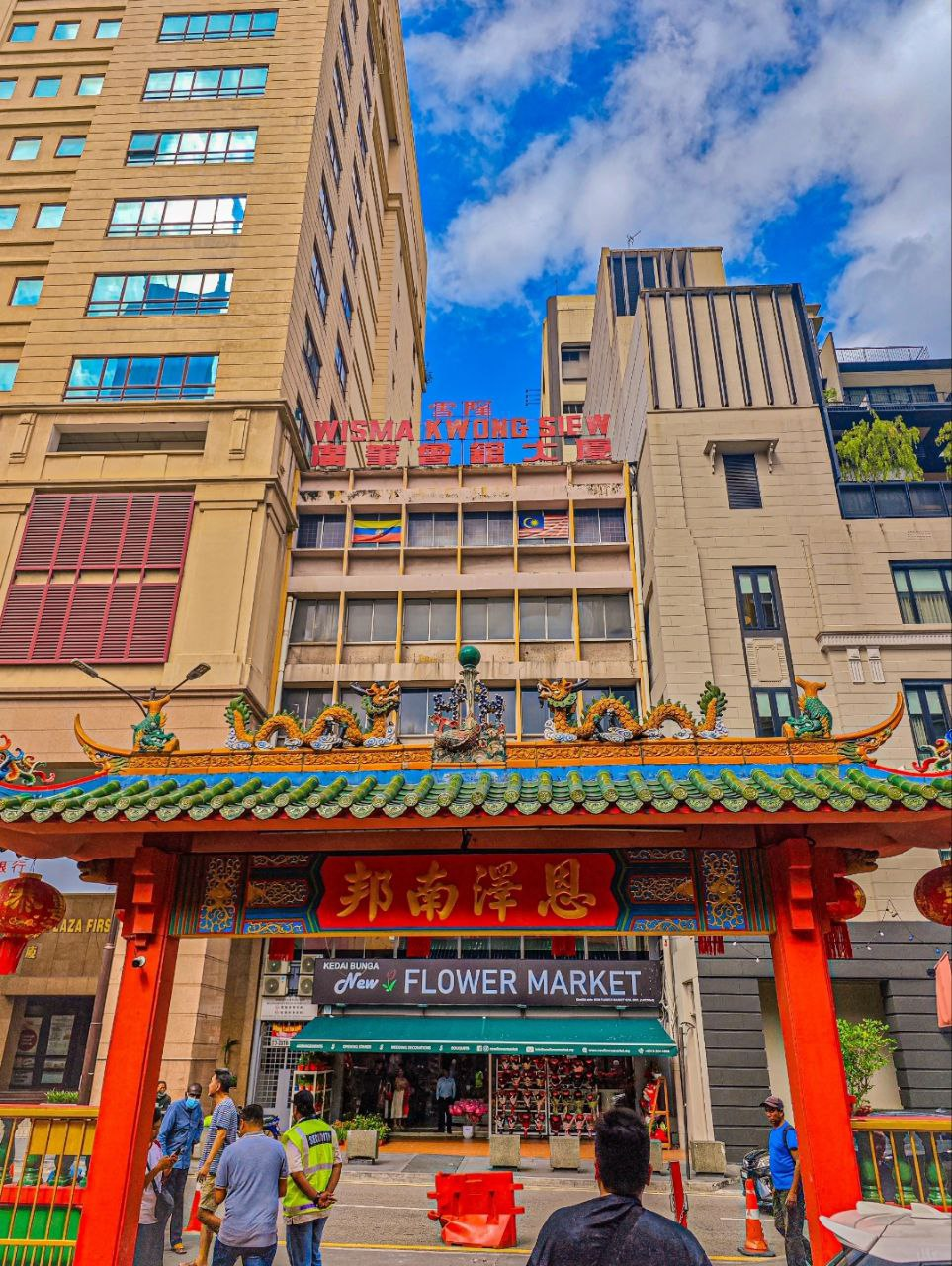
Temple signboard

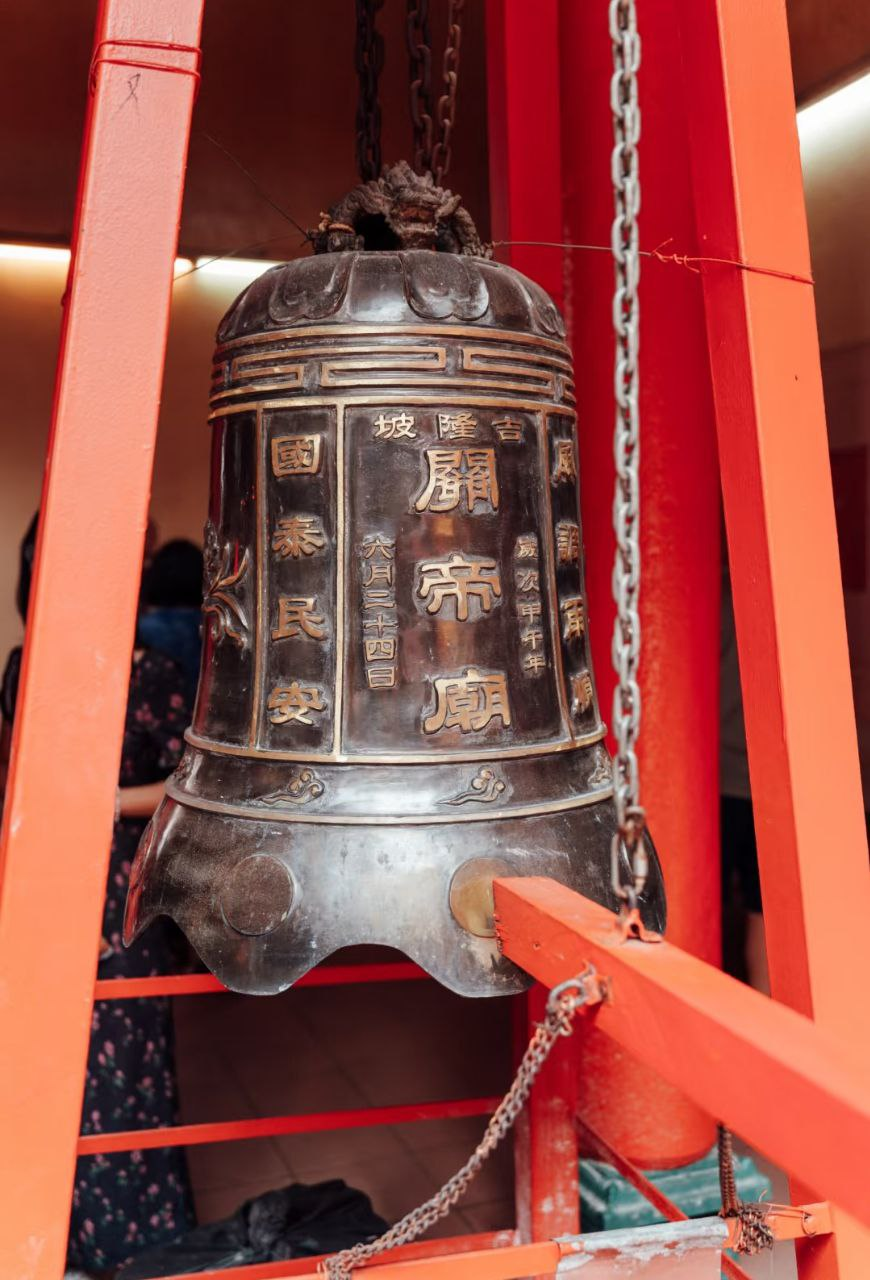
Bell inside the Guan Di Temple

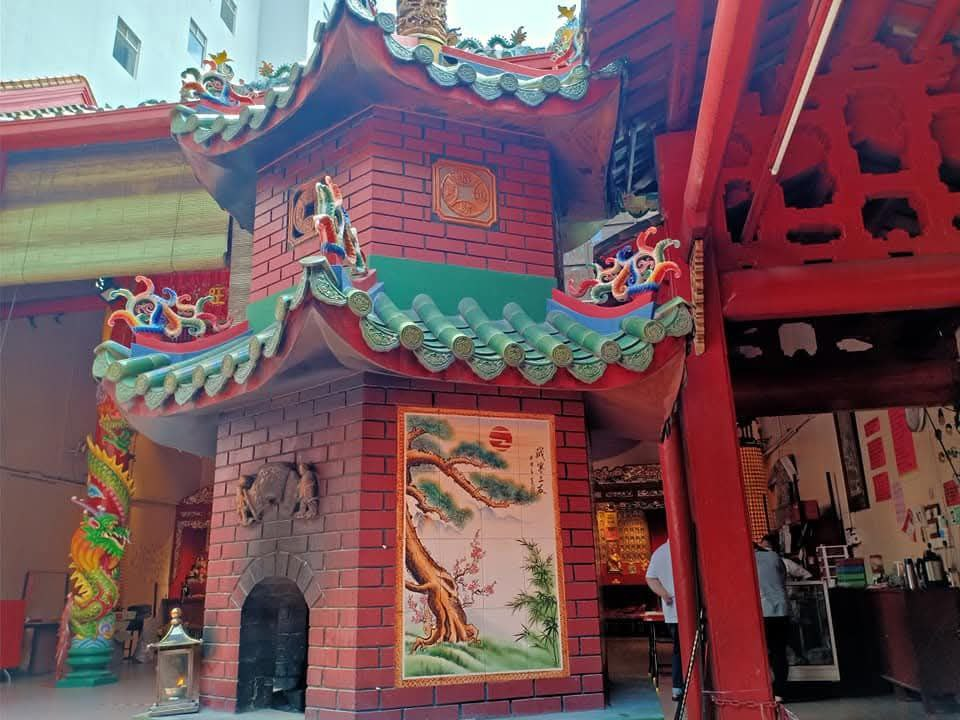
Temple incinerator

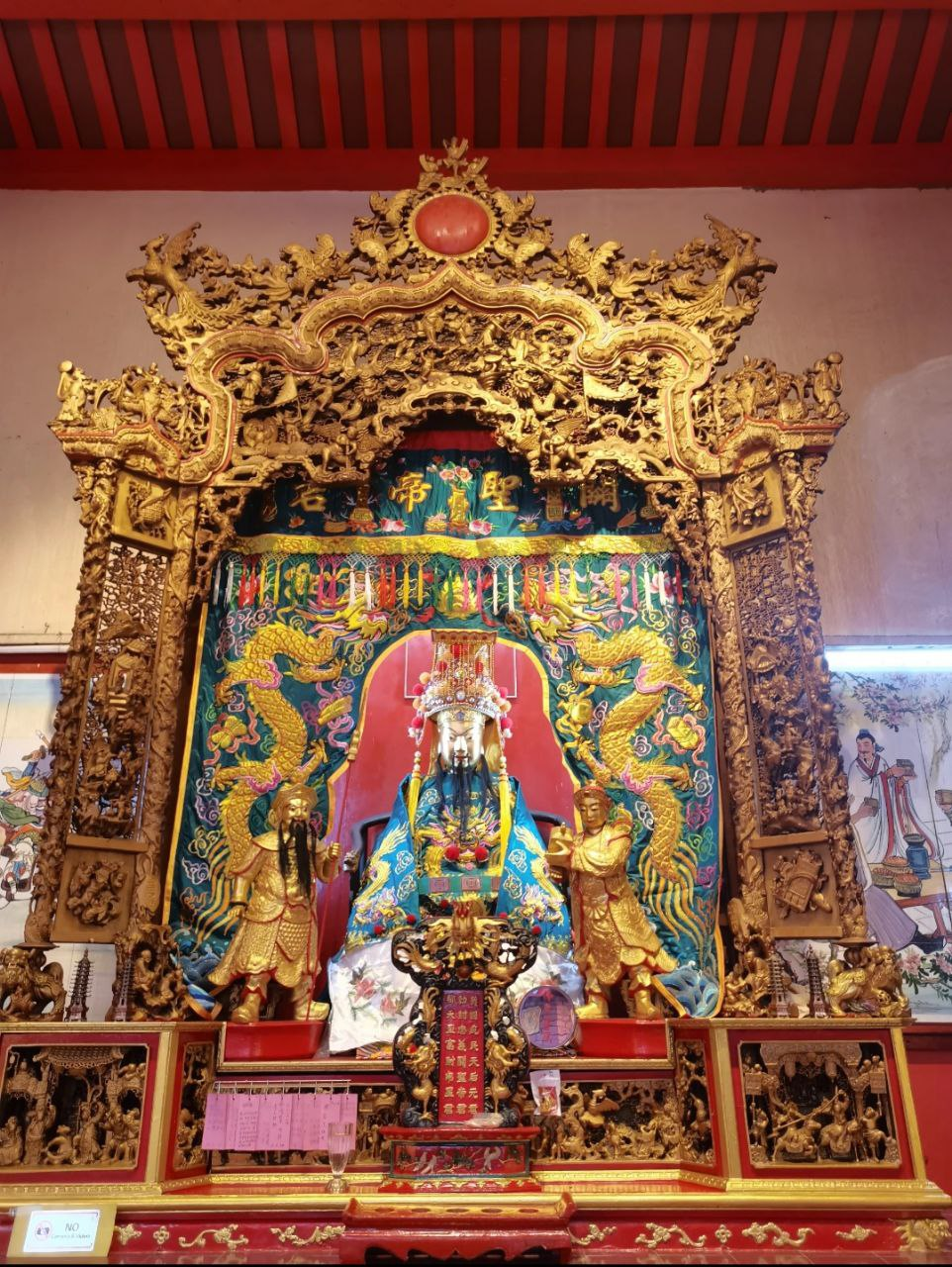
Statue of Guan Di

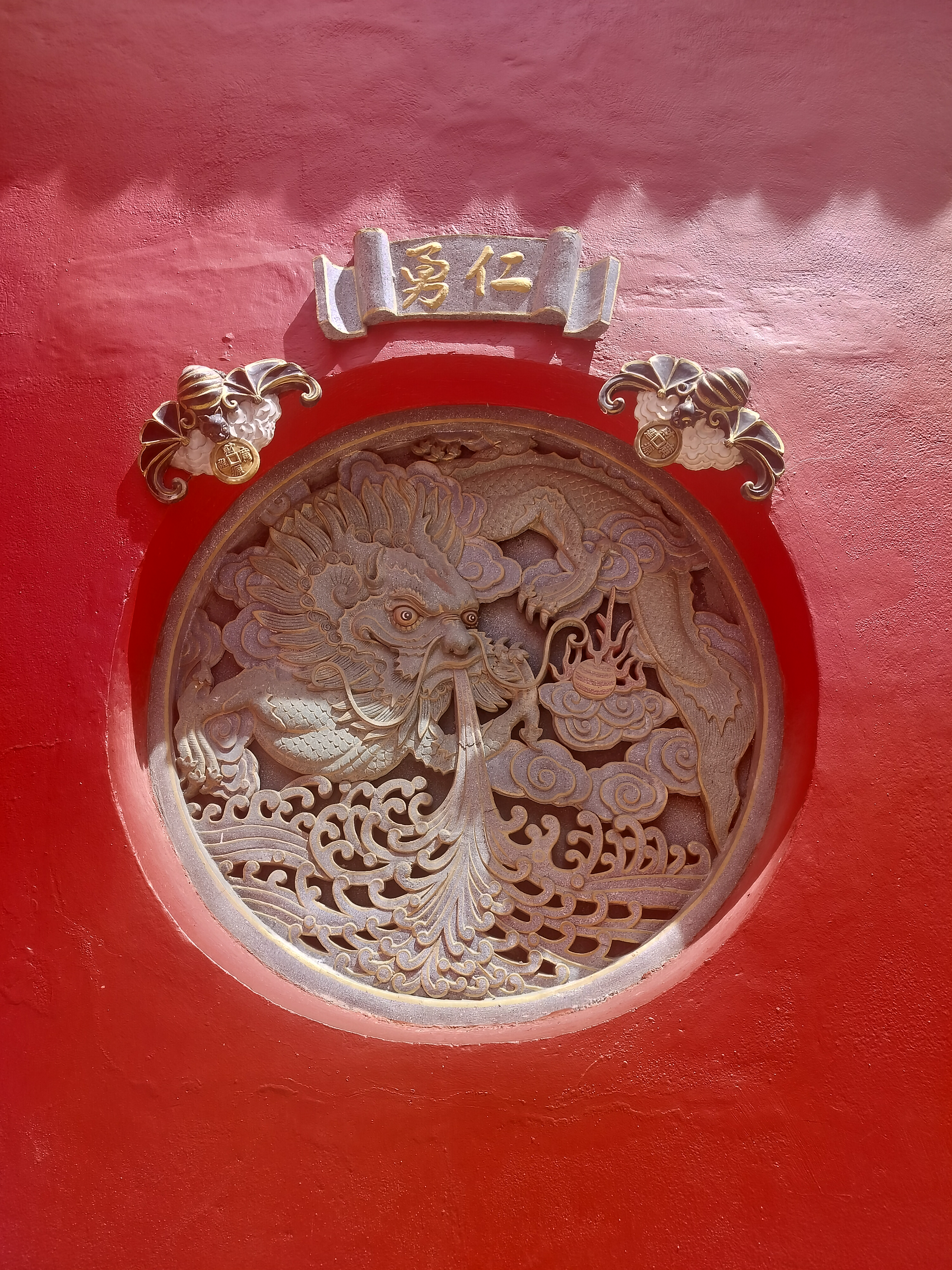
Dragon relief carving

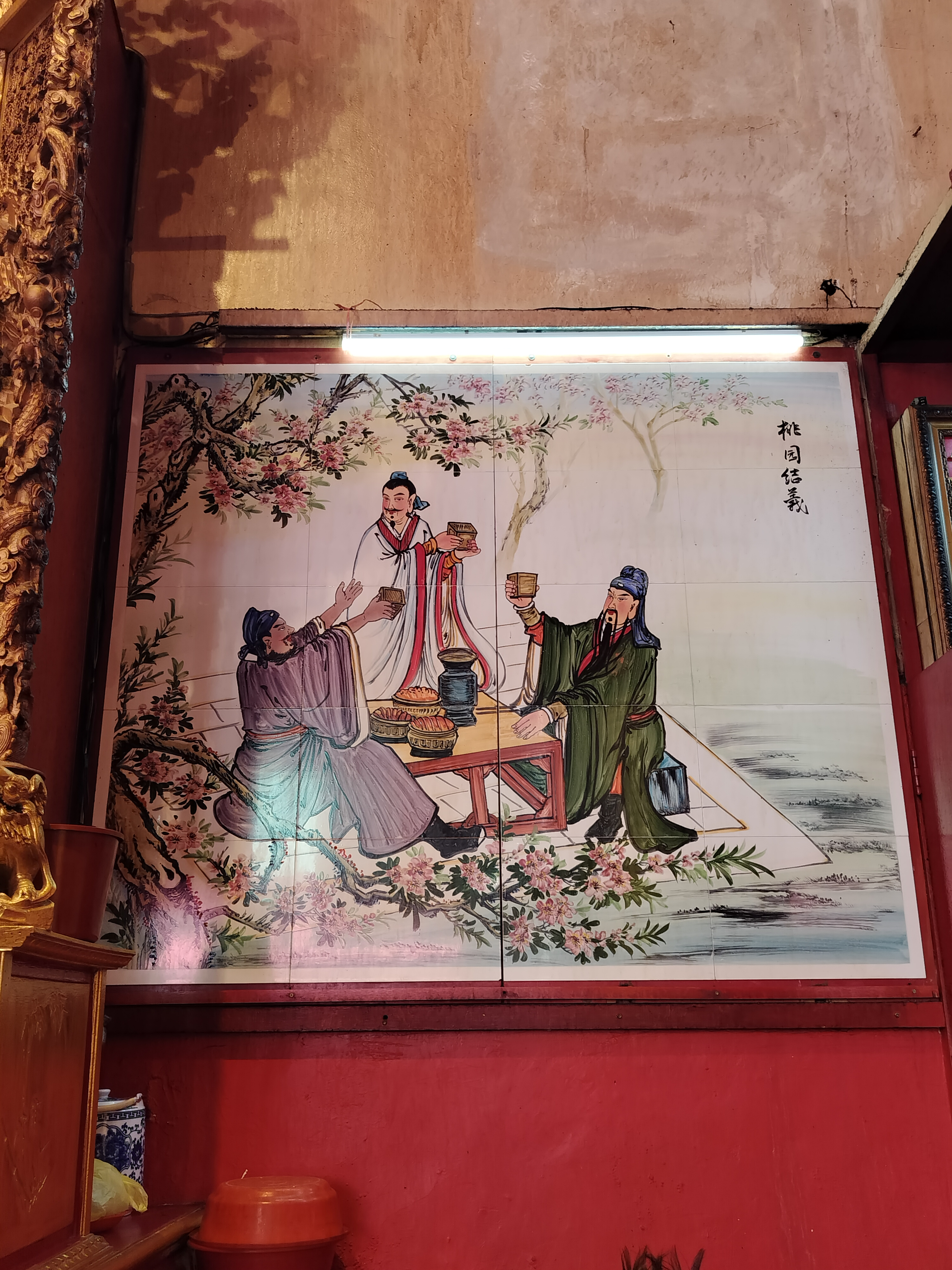
Oath of the Peach Garden scene

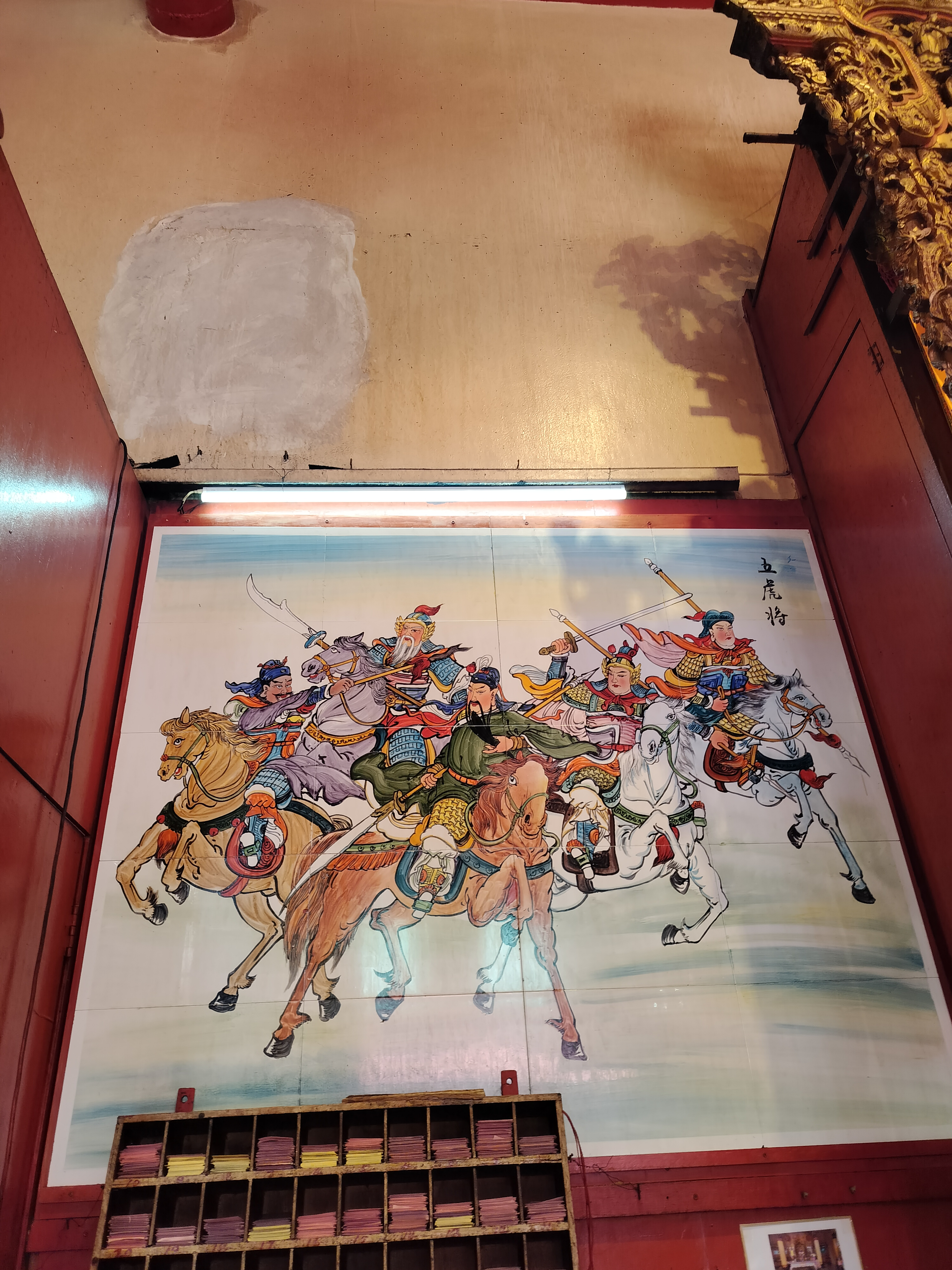
Five Tiger Generals depiction

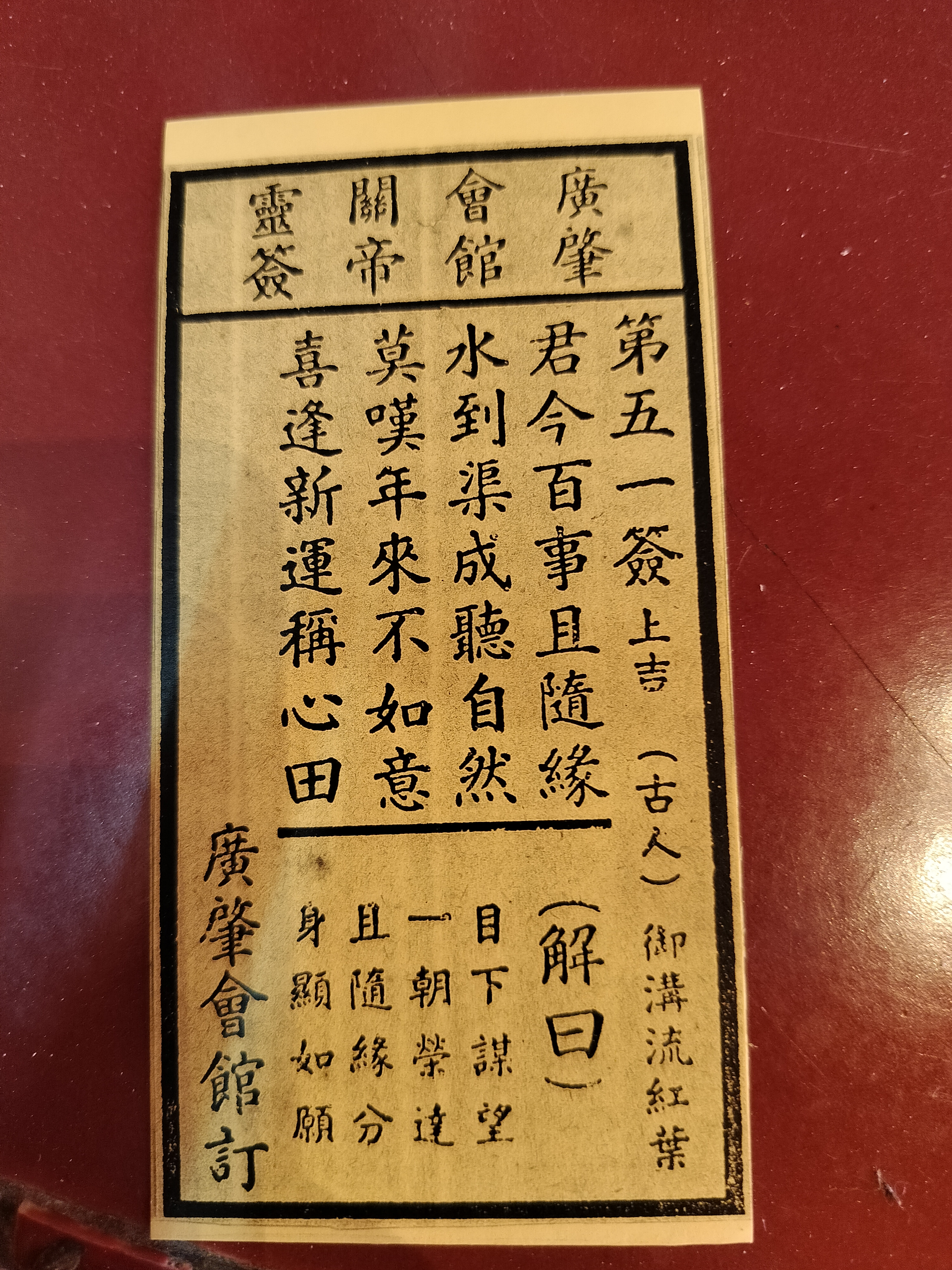
lottery poetry

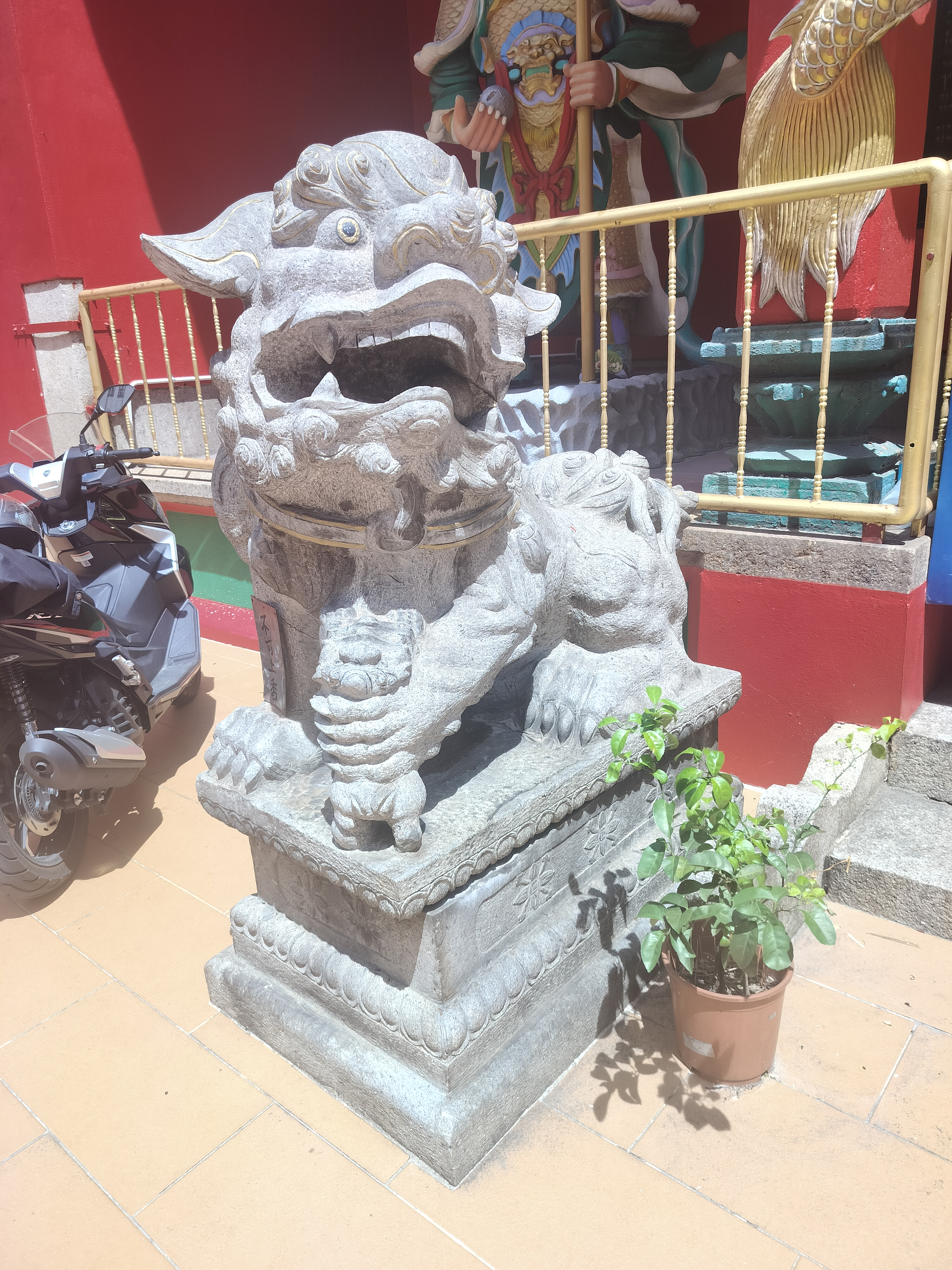
Chinese guardian lion

== See also ==
- Sin Sze Si Ya Temple
- Thean Hou Temple
