= Libraries in China =

Libraries in China have existed since the Shang dynasty (16th to 11th centuries B.C.). Since early in China's history, scholars have kept extensive private libraries, and imperial dynasties have constructed archives to house literary treasures and official records. The first modern libraries in China appeared in the late 19th century, and grew slowly and sporadically until encouraged through a combination of acts and government funding in the 20th century after the founding of the People's Republic of China. Notable libraries in China today include the National Library of China, the Shanghai Municipal Library, and Peking University Library.

== History ==
=== Imperial China ===
The first libraries in China came into being during the time of the Shang dynasty (the sixteenth to eleventh centuries B.C.). Intellectuals known as the Shi (historians) and Wu (diviners) emerged as specialised occupations dedicated to the creation and spread of culture. Among the documents that these occupations managed were "the country's statute books, genealogies of imperial kinsmen, issued notices and orders, and recorded important events and natural phenomena." Storehouses were constructed to preserve the different types of document, and these were increasingly organised according to data and type. With this the first libraries in China came into existence. The variety of the media collected and the richness of the information they contained soon resulted "in the concepts of preservation and collection. Accordingly, the earliest libraries and archives were the result of conscious collection, process, coalition, and utilization."

Early in the history of China, scholars had extensive private libraries, and all of the imperial dynasties constructed libraries and archives to house literary treasures and official records. These early private libraries acted more as book repositories than libraries: basic functions were limited to collecting, preserving, and compiling books, without a notion of lending. There were four major types of book repositories in the Qing dynasty (1644 AD–1912 AD): Government, private, academy (shuyuan), and temple book repositories. The first modern libraries, however, did not appear in China until the late nineteenth century; even then, library service grew slowly and sporadically. In 1949 there were only fifty-five public libraries at the county level and above, most concentrated in major coastal commercial centers.

=== Communist China ===
Following the founding of the People's Republic, government and education leaders strove to develop library services and make them available throughout the country. The National Book Coordination Act of 1957 authorized the establishment of two national library centers, one in Beijing (the National Library of China) and the other in Shanghai (the Shanghai Library), and nine regional library networks. Even so, libraries still were scarce, and those facilities that were available were cramped and offered only rudimentary services. Seeing the lack of libraries as a major impediment to modernization efforts, government leaders in the early 1980s took special interest in their development. The dedicated concentration of funds and talent began to produce significant results. More than forty Chinese institutions of higher learning also had established library science or information science departments. There were more than 2,300 public libraries at the county level and above, containing nearly 256 million volumes, and below the county level some 53,000 cultural centers included a small library or reading room.

At the end of 2004, China had 2,710 public libraries with a shared collection of over 400 million items. By 2011, the number of public had grown to 2,925; and by the end of 2022, there were 3,303 public libraries in China. Of the university or college libraries, the collections of Peking University and Zhejiang University libraries are the most significant. The national library network also includes scientific research institution libraries, trade union libraries, plus libraries and reading rooms attached to government institutions, army units, primary and secondary schools, townships, enterprises and local communities.

== National Library ==
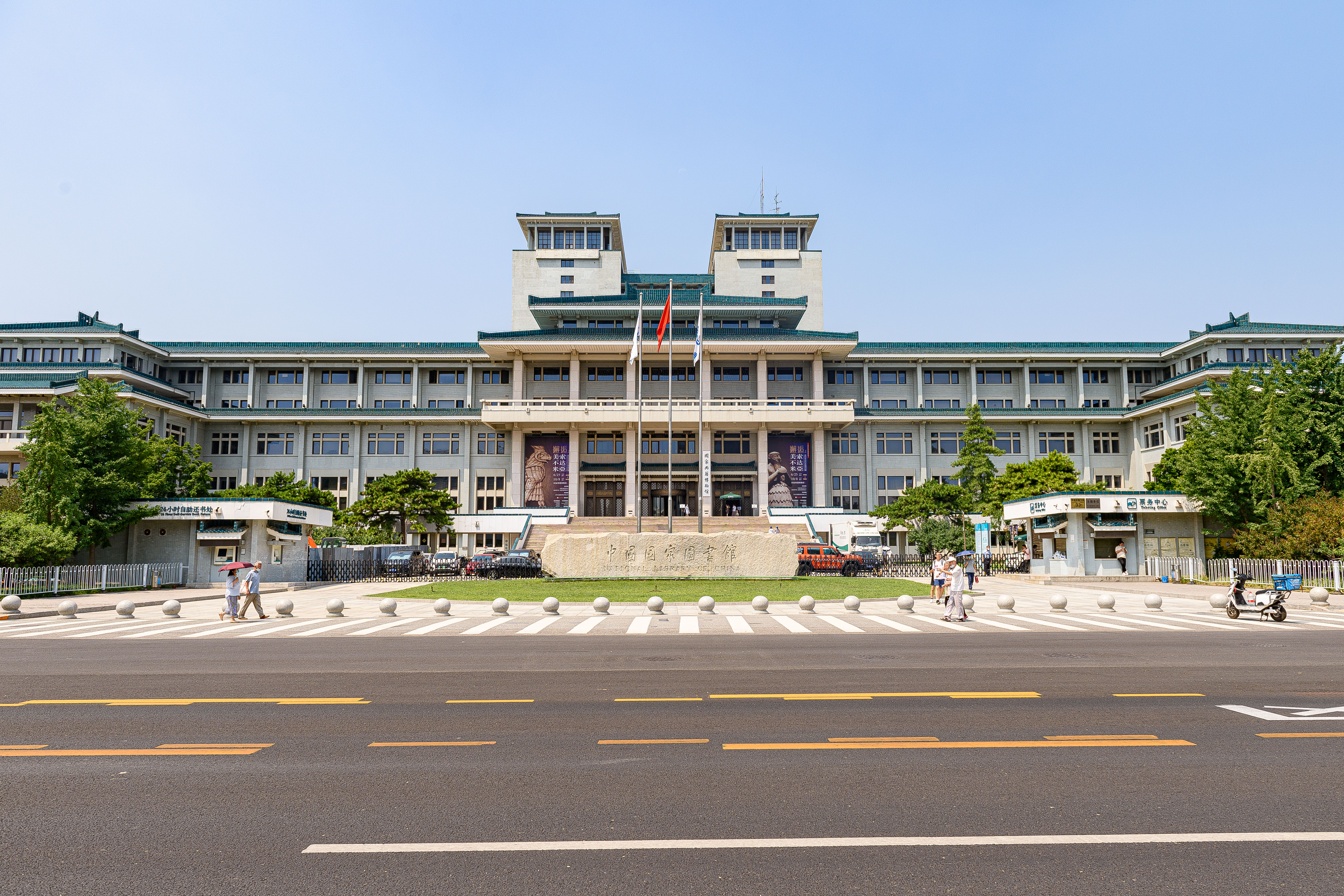
South wing of the National Library of China

The country's main library, the National Library of China, has a collection of over 26 million volumes, and is the largest library in Asia, housing the largest collection of Chinese books in the world. It also houses a collection of books, periodicals, newspapers, maps, prints, photographs, manuscripts, microforms, tape recordings, and inscriptions on bronze, stone, bones, and tortoiseshells. This includes over 35,000 oracle bones and tortoise shells carved with ancient Chinese characters, 1.6 million volumes of traditional thread-bound books, over 16,000 volumes of documents from Dunhuang Grottoes, 12 million volumes of foreign-language books, and dozens of electronic databases.

The library started to accept the submissions of official national publications in 1916, becoming the main national repository; and began to accept submissions of domestic electronic publications in 1987. It also acts as the country's ISSN (International Standard Serial Number) Center and Network Information Center. At present, the National Library of China has formed a digital library alliance with some 90 other libraries around the country, making joint efforts in promoting the development and application of China's digital public information service. The second phase of the National Library – China Digital Library, whose foundation was laid at the end of 2004, was completed in October 2007. The expanded library will be able to meet book storage demand for the next 30 years. The Digital Library will make it the world's biggest Chinese literature collection center and digital resources base, as well as the most advanced network service base in China.

== Other libraries ==
The Shanghai Municipal Library, one of the largest public libraries in the country, contains over 7 million volumes, nearly 1 million of which are in foreign languages. The Shanghai Library is China's largest provincial-level library. Of its collection, the over 1.7 million volumes of ancient documents are the most valuable and representative, including 25,000 titles of rare ancient books in 178,000 volumes, many being the only copies extant in the world. The oldest document dates back nearly 1,500 years.

The Peking University Library took over the collections of the Yanjing University Library in 1950 and by the mid-1980s – with more than 3 million volumes, a quarter of them in foreign languages – had grown to be one of the most prominent university libraries in the country, as one of the earliest modern new libraries in China. Approved by the State Council as the first batch of national key ancient books protection unit making into developed into a modernized and comprehensive research library.

=== Major provincial libraries ===
- Anhui Library 安徽省图书馆
- Capital Library in Beijing
- Chongqing Library 重庆市图书馆
- Fujian Library 福建省图书馆
- Gansu Library 甘肃省图书馆
- Sun Yat-sen Library of Guangdong Province 广东省图书馆
- Library of Guangxi Zhuang Autonomous Region 广西壮族自治区图书馆
- Guizhou Library 贵州省图书馆
- Hainan Library 海南省图书馆
- Hebei Library 河北省图书馆
- Heilongjiang Library 黑龙江省图书馆
- Henan Library 河南图书馆
- Hubei Provincial Library 湖北省图书馆
- Hunan Library 湖南省图书馆
- Library of Inner Mongolia Autonomous Region 内蒙古自治区图书馆
- Jiangxi Library 江西省图书馆
- Jilin Library 吉林省图书馆
- Liaoning Library 辽宁省图书馆
- Nanjing Library 南京圖書館
- Library of Ningxia Hui Autonomous Region 宁夏回族自治区图书馆
- Qinghai Library 青海省图书馆
- Shaanxi Library 陕西省图书馆
- Shandong Library 山东省图书馆
- Shanghai Library 上海市图书馆
- Shanxi Library 山西省图书馆
- Sichuan Library 四川省图书馆
- Tianjin Library 天津市图书馆
- Tibet Autonomous Region Library 西藏自治区图书馆
- Library of Xinjiang Uygur Autonomous Region 新疆自治区图书馆
- Yunnan Library 云南省图书馆
- Zhejiang Library 浙江省图书馆

=== Special administrative region libraries ===
- Hong Kong Public Libraries
  - Hong Kong Central Library
- Macao Public Library
  - Macao Central Library
  - Sir Robert Ho Tung Library

Libraries operated in the "Taiwan Area of the Republic of China" - the Republic of China (Taiwan) - are not included.

=== Municipal libraries ===
This excludes libraries of direct-administered municipalities of China, which are listed with provincial libraries, and libraries of special administrative regions.

- Guangzhou Library
- Hangzhou Library
- Nanjing Library
- Shenzhen Library
- Chengdu Library
- Dalian Library
- Suzhou Library
- Wuhan Library
- Sun Yat-sen Memorial Library (Zhongshan)
- Zhongshan Library Xiamen Municipal Library Gulangyu Branch

== See also ==
- Chinese Library Classification (CLC)
- Archives in the People's Republic of China
- Boone Library School
- Culture of the People's Republic of China
- Education in the People's Republic of China
- List of libraries in China
- National first-class library
- Ningbo Library
- Taizhou Library
