= National first-class library =

Category of state-level libraries in China

The national first-class, first-level or first-grade libraries (in Chinese: 国家一级图书馆) are state-level libraries that have been deliberated and decided upon by the State Council of the People's Republic of China. The seventh evaluation was conducted in 2023.

== Requirements ==
National first-level libraries must meet six standards:

- The building area should not be less than 6,000 square meters.
- The annual subsidy funding should not be less than 800,000 RMB.
- The ratio of staff with a college degree or above should not be less than 60% of the total workforce.
- The annual total number of books added to the collection should not be less than 5,000.
- The annual number of books lent outside should not be less than 200,000 times.
- The score for "modern technology equipment, database construction, and automation network construction" evaluation should not be less than 80 points.

== History ==
On June 22, 2005, the Ministry of Culture of the People's Republic of China announced a list in "Decision of the Ministry of Culture on Naming First, Second, and Third-class Libraries," naming 344 libraries as "first-class libraries," 412 libraries as "second-class libraries," and 684 libraries as "third-class libraries."

In 2009, the Ministry of Culture decided to conduct the fourth evaluation, with 480 first-class libraries, 410 second-class libraries, and 894 third-class libraries.

The fifth evaluation was conducted in 2013, with 859 first-class libraries, 640 second-class libraries, and 731 third-class libraries.

In May 2018, the sixth evaluation was conducted, with 969 first-class libraries, 519 second-class libraries, and 1,034 third-class libraries.

The seventh evaluation was conducted in December 2023, with 1,302 first-class libraries, 680 second-class libraries, and 741 third-class libraries.

== List of libraries ==
City or province	Libraries
Beijing	Capital Library, Dongcheng District Library, Xicheng District Library, Xicheng District Second Library, Xicheng District Youth and Children's Library, Chaoyang District Library, Fengtai District Library, Shijingshan District Library, Shijingshan District Youth and Children's Library, Haidian District Library, Fangshan District Library, Tongzhou District Library, Changping District Library, Daxing District Library, Huairou District Library, Pinggu District Library, Miyun District Library, Yanqing District Library
Tianjin	Tianjin Library, Tianjin Children's Library, Tianjin Binhai Library, Heping District Library, Hedong District Library, Nankai District Library, Hongqiao District Youth and Children's Library, Taida Library, Binhai Dagang Library, Dongli District Library, Jinnan District Library, Beichen District Library, Jinghai District Library, Jizhou District Library, Baodi District Library
Hebei	Hebei Provincial Library, Shijiazhuang City Library, Tangshan City Library, Qinhuangdao City Library, Xingtai City Library, Cangzhou City Library, Langfang City Library, Tangshan City Fengnan District Library, Letting County Library, Zunhua City Library, Qian'an City Library, She County Library, Wu'an City Library, Shahe City Library, Laishui County Library, Yi County Library, Zhuozhou Library, Zhangbei County Library, Luanping County Library, Botou City Library, Bazhou City Library
Shanxi	Shanxi Provincial Library, Taiyuan City Library, Taiyuan Xiaodian District Library, Qingxu County Library, Datong City Library (Datong Children's Library), Datong City Pingcheng District Library, Datong City Yungang District Library, Datong City Yunzhou District Library, Shuozhou City Library, Ying County Library, Huairen City Library, Fenyang City Library, Jinzhong City Library, Lingshi County Library, Jiexiu City Library, Changzhi City Library, Changzhi City Luzhou District Library, Changzhi City Shangdang District Library, Qinyuan County Library, Jincheng City Library, Linfen City Library, Quwo County Library, Hongdong County Library, Gu County Library, Xiangning County Library, Linyi County Library, Xinjiang County Library, Pinglu County Library, Ruicheng County Library, Yongji City Library, Hejin City Library
Inner Mongolia	Baotou City Library, Ordos City Library, Baotou City Qingshan District Library, Baotou City Jiuyuan District Library, Tumed Right Banner Library, Wuhai City Wuda District Library, Tongliao City Khorchin District Library, Kailu County Library, Naiman Banner Library, Chifeng City Hongshan District Ethnic Youth and Children's Library, Ordos City Dongsheng District Library, Otog Banner Library, Uxin Banner Library, Horqin Right Middle Banner Library
Liaoning	Shenyang City Library, Dalian Library, Dalian Children's Library, Anshan City Library, Yingkou City Library, Shenyang City Heping District Library, Shenyang City Dadong District Library, Shenyang City Dongling District Library, Shenyang City Shenbei New District Library, Shenyang City Yuhong District Library, Dalian Development Zone Library, Dalian Xigang District Library, Dalian Shahekou District Library, Dalian Ganjingzi District Library, Dalian Lushunkou District Library, Dalian Jinzhou District Library, Wafangdian City Library, Pulandian City Library, Zhuanghe City Library, Anshan City Tiedong District Library, Haicheng City Library, Yingkou City Bayuquan District Library, Jianping County Library, Beipiao City Library, Lingyuan City Library
Jilin	Changchun City Children's Library, Yanbian Korean Autonomous Prefecture Library, Jilin City Library, Songyuan City Library, Yanji City Children's Library, Changchun City Kuancheng District Library, Changchun City Chaoyang District Library, Changchun City Luyuan District Library, Jiaohe City Library, Huadian City Library, Tonghua County Library, Fusong County Library, Qian Gorlos Mongol Autonomous County Library, Dunhua City Library, Longjing City Library
Heilongjiang	Heilongjiang Provincial Library, Mudanjiang City Library, Daqing City Library, Harbin City Nangang District Library, Harbin City Xiangfang District Library, Harbin City Acheng District Library, Harbin City Shuangcheng City Library, Baiquan County Library, Yichun City Xilin District Library, Yichun City Jinshantun District Library, Jiayin County Library, Suifenhe City Library, Dongning County Library, Hailin City Library, Wangkui County Library, Qing'an County Library, Suileng County Library
Shanghai	Shanghai Library, Shanghai Children's Library, Huangpu District Library, Huangpu District Mingfu Library, Xuhui District Library, Changning District Library, Changning District Children's Library, Jing'an District Library, Putuo District Library, Putuo District Children's Library, Zhabei District Library, Zhabei District Children's Library, Hongkou District Library, Yangpu District Library, Minhang District Library, Baoshan District Library, Jiading District Library, Pudong Library, Pudong New Area Lujiazui Library, Pudong New Area Xinchuansha Library, Songjiang District Library, Qingpu District Library, Fengxian District Library, Chongming Library
Jiangsu	Nanjing Library, Jinling Library, Wuxi Library, Xuzhou Library, Changzhou Library, Suzhou Library, Nantong Library, Nantong Children's Library, Lianyungang Library, Lianyungang Children's Library, Huai'an Library, Huai'an Children's Library, Yancheng Library, Yangzhou Library, Yangzhou Children's Library, Zhenjiang Library, Taizhou Library, Nanjing Xuanwu District Children's Library, Nanjing Baixia District Library, Nanjing Qinhuai District Library, Nanjing Jianye District Library, Nanjing Gulou District Library, Nanjing Pukou District Library, Nanjing Qixia District Library, Nanjing Yuhuatai District Library, Nanjing Jiangning District Library, Nanjing Liuhe District First Library, Nanjing Liuhe District Second Library, Nanjing Lishui District Library, Nanjing Lishui District Children's Library, Nanjing Gaochun District Library, Wuxi Liangxi District Library, Wuxi Xishan District Library, Wuxi Huishan District Library, Wuxi Binhu District Library, Wuxi New District Library, Jiangyin Library, Yixing Library, Xuzhou Tongshan District Library, Pei County Library, Xinyi City Library, Pizhou City Library, Changzhou Wujin District Library, Liyang City Library, Jintan City Library, Suzhou Canglang District Library, Suzhou Pingjiang District Library, Suzhou Jinchang District Library, Suzhou Wuzhong District Library, Suzhou Xiangcheng District Library, Suzhou High-tech Zone Library, Suzhou Wujiang District Library, Suzhou Industrial Park Dushu Lake Library, Changshu Library, Zhangjiagang Library, Zhangjiagang Children's Library, Kunshan Library, Taicang Library, Nantong Tongzhou District Library, Hai'an County Library, Rudong County Library, Qidong City Library, Rugao City Library, Haimen City Library, Ganyu County Library, Donghai County Library, Guanyun County Library, Guannan County Library, Huai'an District Library, Huai'an Qinghe District Library, Hongze County Library, Xuyi County Library, Jinhu County Library, Yancheng Yandu District Library, Binhai County Library, Funing County Library, Sheyang County Library, Jianhu County Library, Dongtai City Library, Dafeng City Library, Yangzhou Jiangdu District Library, Yangzhou Hanjiang District Library, Yizheng City Library, Gaoyou City Library, Zhenjiang Jingkou District Library, Zhenjiang Runzhou District Library, Zhenjiang Dantu District Library, Danyang City Library, Yangzhong City Library, Jurong City Library, Taizhou Gaogang District Library, Taizhou Jiangyan District Library, Xinghua City Library, Jingjiang City Library, Taixing City Library, Suqian Sucheng District Library, Shuyang County Library, Siyang County Library
Zhejiang	Zhejiang Library, Hangzhou Library, Hangzhou Children's Library, Ningbo Library, Wenzhou Library, Wenzhou Children's Library, Jiaxing Library, Huzhou Library, Shaoxing Library, Jinhua Library, Zhoushan Library, Taizhou Library, Hangzhou Xiacheng District Library, Hangzhou Jianggan District Library, Hangzhou Gongshu District Library, Hangzhou Xihu District Library, Xiaoshan Library, Hangzhou Yuhang District Library, Hangzhou Fuyang District Library, Tonglu County Library, Jiande City Library, Lin'an City Library, Ningbo Jiangdong District Library, Ningbo Yinzhou District Library, Ningbo Zhenhai District Library, Ningbo Beilun District Library, Ningbo Haishu District Library, Ningbo Jiangbei District Library, Ningbo Fenghua District Library, Xiangshan County Library, Ninghai County Library, Yuyao City Library, Cixi City Library, Wenzhou Ouhai District Library, Wenzhou Longwan District Library, Dongtou County Library, Yongjia County Library, Pingyang County Library, Cangnan County Library, Taishun County Library, Ruian City Library, Yueqing City Library, Jiashan County Library, Haiyan Zhangyuanji Library, Haining City Library, Pinghu City Library, Tongxiang City Library, Huzhou Nanxun District Library, Deqing County Library, Changxing County Library, Anji County Library, Shaoxing County Library, Xinchang County Library, Zhuji City Library, Shangyu City Library, Shengzhou City Library, Wuyi County Library, Pujiang County Library, Pan'an County Library, Lanxi City Library, Yiwu City Library, Dongyang City Library, Yongkang City Library, Zhoushan Dinghai District Library, Zhoushan Putuo District Library, Daishan County Library, Shengsi County Library, Taizhou Jiaojiang District Library, Wenling City Library, Linhai City Library, Yunhe County Library, Jingning She Autonomous County Library, Longquan City Library, Yuhuan City Library
Anhui	Anhui Provincial Library, Hefei City Library, Wuhu City Library, Tongling City Library, Ma'anshan City Library, Taihu County Library, Tongcheng City Library, Ningguo City Library
Fujian	Fujian Provincial Library, Fuzhou City Library, Fuzhou Cangshan District Library, Fuzhou Taijiang District Library, Fuzhou Mawei District Library, Fuzhou Changle District Library, Fuqing City Library, Minhou County Library, Yongtai County Library, Xiamen City Library, Xiamen Children's Library, Quanzhou City Library, Sanming City Library, Longyan Library, Xiamen Siming District Library, Xiamen Haicang District Library, Xiamen Huli District Library, Xiamen Jimei Library, Xiamen Jimei District Children's Library, Xiamen Tong'an District Library, Xiamen Xiang'an District Library, Shaxian County Library, Jiangle County Library, Yong'an City Library, Quanzhou Licheng District Library, Yongchun County Library, Shishi City Library, Jinjiang City Library, Nan'an City Library, Nan'an Li Chengzhi Public Library, Nanjing County Library, Longhai City Library, Shaowu City Library
Jiangxi	Nanchang City Library, Jingdezhen City Library, Pingxiang City Library, Jiujiang City Library, Ganzhou City Library, Ji'an City Library, Yichun City Library, Fuzhou City Library, Shangrao City Library, Lushan Library, Huichang County Library, Jinxian County Library, Leping City Library, Lianhua County Library, Wuning County Library, Xiushui County Library, Hukou County Library, Ruichang City Library, Yushui District Library, Fenyi County Library, Yuehu District Library, Dayu County Library, Shangyou County Library, Dingnan County Library, Quannan County Library, Yudu County Library, Qingyuan District Library, Ji'an County Library, Xiajiang County Library, Suichuan County Library, Wan'an County Library, Anfu County Library, Fengxin County Library, Wanzai County Library, Shanggao County Library, Yifeng County Library, Jing'an County Library, Chongren County Library, Jinxi County Library, Yiyang County Library
Shandong	Shandong Provincial Library, Qingdao City Library, Jinan City Library, Zibo City Library, Zaozhuang City Library, Dongying City Library, Yantai Library, Weifang City Library, Jining City Library, Tai'an City Library, Laiwu City Library, Linyi City Library, Dezhou City Library, Heze City Library, Jinan City Li Xia District Library, Jinan City Center District Library, Jinan City Huaiyin District Library, Jinan City Tianqiao District Library, Jinan City Licheng District Library, Jinan City Changqing District Library, Shanghe County Library, Zhangqiu City Library, Qingdao Economic and Technological Development Zone Library, Qingdao City South District Library, Qingdao City Shibei District First Library, Qingdao City Shibei District Second Library, Qingdao City Huangdao District Library, Qingdao City Laoshan District Library, Qingdao City Licang District Library, Qingdao City Chengyang District Library, Jimo City Library, Pingdu City Library, Laixi City Library, Zibo City Zhangdian District Children's Library, Huantai County Library, Yiyuan County Library, Tengzhou City Library, Dongying City Dongying District Library, Kenli County Library, Guangrao County Library, Yantai Economic and Technological Development Zone Library, Yantai City Muping District Library, Longkou City Library, Laiyang City Library, Laizhou City Library, Zhaoyuan City Library, Weifang City Fangzi District Library, Weifang City Kuiwen District Library, Qingzhou City Library, Zhucheng City Library, Shouguang City Library, Gaomi City Library, Changyi City Library, Jinxiang County Library, Qufu City Library, Yanzhou City Library, Zoucheng City Library, Tai'an City Taishan District Library, Dongping County Library, Feicheng City Library, Wendeng City Library, Rongcheng City Library, Rushan City Library, Laiwu City Gangcheng District Library, Tancheng County Library, Yishui County Library, Linshu County Library, Lingxian County Library, Qihe County Library, Pingyuan County Library, Yucheng City Library, Chiping County Library, Dong'e County Library, Wudi County Library, Boxing County Library, Heze City Mudan District Library
Henan	Zhengzhou Library, Luoyang City Library, Anyang City Library, Hebi City Library, Xinxiang City Library, Jiaozuo City Library, Xuchang City Library, Sanmenxia City Library, Xinyang City Library, Jiyuan City Library, Zhengzhou City Jinshui District Library, Zhengzhou City Shangjie District Library, Zhengzhou Economic and Technological Development Zone Library, Yingyang City Library, Xinzheng City Library, Mengjin County Library, Xin'an County Library, Yanshi City Library, Baofeng County Library, Yanjin County Library, Xiuwu County Library, Yanling County Library, Yuzhou City Library, Mianchi County Library, Shan County Library, Lingbao City Library, Xichuan County Library, Shangqiu City Liangyuan District Library, Shangqiu City Suiyang District Library, Sui County Library, Yongcheng City Library, Xinyang City Pingqiao District Library, Luoshan County Library, Shangcheng County Library, Shangshui County Library, Dancheng County Library, Huaiyang County Library, Xiping County Library, Shangcai County Library, Runan County Library
Hubei	Hubei Provincial Library, Wuhan Library, Wuhan Children's Library, Huangshi City Library, Shiyan City Library, Yichang City Library, Xiangyang City Library, Ezhou City Library, Jingzhou City Library, Wuhan Jiang'an District Library, Wuhan Jianghan District Library, Wuhan Qiaokou District Library, Wuhan Hanyang District Library, Wuhan Qingshan District Library, Wuhan Hongshan District Library, Wuhan Dongxihu District Library, Wuhan Caidian District Library, Wuhan Jiangxia District Library, Daye City Library, Yichang Yiling District Library, Yuan'an County Library, Xingshan County Library, Zigui County Library, Changyang County Library, Dangyang City Library, Xiangyang Xiangzhou District Library, Gucheng County Library, Laohekou City Library, Yicheng City Library, Jingshan County Library, Zhongxiang City Library, Yingcheng City Library, Songzi City Library, Yuanfeng County Library, Hong'an County Library, Luotian County Library, Xishui County Library, Qichun County Library, Huangmei County Library, Macheng City Library, Jiayu County Library, Chongyang County Library, Chibi City Library, Lichuan City Library, Xiantao City Library, Qianjiang City Library, Tianmen City Library
Hunan	Hunan Provincial Library, Hunan Provincial Children's Library, Zhuzhou City Library, Hengyang City Library, Yueyang City Library, Changde City Library, Furong District Library in Changsha City, Tianxin District Library in Changsha City, Yuelu District Library in Changsha City, Kaifu District Library in Changsha City, Yuhua District Library in Changsha City, Changsha County Library, Wangcheng District Lei Feng Library in Changsha City, Ningxiang County Library, Liuyang City Library, You County Library, Chaling County Library, Yanling County Library, Liling City Library, Xiangtan County Library, Xiangxiang City Library, Shaoshan City Library, Hengnan County Library, Yongding District Library in Zhangjiajie City, Ronghuan Library in Hengdong County, Shaodong County Library, Weiyuan Library in Longhui County, Yueyang County Library, Huarong County Library, Pingjiang County Library, Miluo City Library, Linxiang City Library, Shimen County Library, Ziyang District Library in Yiyang City, Heshan District Library in Yiyang City, Taojiang County Library, Lingling District Library in Yongzhou City, Qiyang County Library, Shuangfeng County Library, Lengshuijiang City Library, Lianyuan City Library, Luxi County Library, Fenghuang County Library, Huayuan County Library
Guangdong	Sun Yat-sen Library of Guangdong Province, Guangzhou Library, Guangzhou Children's Library, Shenzhen Library, Shenzhen Children's Library, Zhuhai City Library, Shantou City Library, Foshan City Library, Zhanjiang City Library, Zhanjiang Children's Library, Maoming City Library, Zhaoqing City Library, Huizhou Library, Meizhou Jianying Library, Dongguan Library, Sun Yat-sen Memorial Library, Liwan District Library in Guangzhou City, Guangzhou Yuexiu Library, Haizhu District Library in Guangzhou City, Tianhe District Library in Guangzhou City, Baiyun District Library in Guangzhou City, Huangpu District Library in Guangzhou City, Panyu District Library in Guangzhou City, Huadu District Library in Guangzhou City, Nansha District Library in Guangzhou City, Luogang District Library in Guangzhou City, Zengcheng City Library, Conghua City Library, Luohu District Library in Shenzhen City, Futian District Library in Shenzhen City, Nanshan District Library in Shenzhen City, Bao'an District Library in Shenzhen City, Longgang District Library in Shenzhen City, Yantian District Library in Shenzhen City, Longhu District Library in Shantou City, Chenghai District Library in Shantou City, Chancheng District Library in Foshan City, Nanhai District Library in Foshan City, Shunde District Library in Foshan City, Sanshui District Library in Foshan City, Gaoming District Library in Foshan City, Jiangmen Wuyi Library, Xinhui Jingtang Library in Jiangmen City, Taishan City Library, Kaiping City Library, Heshan City Library, Enping City Library, Gaozhou City Library, Duanzhou District Library in Zhaoqing City, Guangning County Library, Huaiji County Library, Gaoyao City Library, Sihui City Library, Huizhou Huiyang District Library, Boluo County Library, Huidong County Library, Meixian Library, Jiaoling County Library, Xingning City Library, Yingde City Library, Lianzhou City Library, Zhongshan Development Zone Library, Rongcheng District Library in Jieyang City, Puning City Library, Xinxing County Library, Luoding City Library
Guangxi	Guangxi Zhuang Autonomous Region Library, Nanning Library, Nanning Children's Library, Liuzhou Library, Beihai Children's Library, Guigang Library, Yulin Library, Long'an County Library, Binyang County Library, Heng County Library, Lingchuan County Library, Lingshan County Library, Bobai County Library, Beiliu City Library, Xingbin District Library, Xiangzhou County Library
Chongqing	Chongqing Library, Chongqing Children's Library, Fuling District Library, Fuling Children's Library, Yuzhong District Library, Dadukou District Library, Jiangbei District Library, Shapingba District Library, Jiulongpo District Library, Nan'an District Library, Beibei Library, Wansheng Economic and Technological Development Zone Library, Qianjiang District Library, Changshou District Library, Tongnan County Library, Tongliang County Library, Rongchang County Library, Bishan County Library, Wulong County Library, Zhong County Library, Kaixian Library, Yunyang County Library, Fengjie County Library, Xiushan County Library, Youyang County Library
Sichuan	Chengdu Library, Panzhihua City Library, Luzhou City Library, Mianyang City Library, Deng Xiaoping Library, Chengdu Jinjiang District Library, Chengdu Qingyang District Library, Chengdu Jinniu District Library, Chengdu Wuhou District Library, Chengdu Chenghua District Library, Chengdu Longquanyi District Library, Chengdu Qingbaijiang District Library, Chengdu Xindu District Library, Chengdu Wenjiang District Library, Chengdu High-tech Zone Library, Shuangliu County Library, Pixian Library, Xinjin County Library, Dujiangyan City Library, Pengzhou City Library, Qionglai City Library, Chongzhou City Library, Miyi County Library, Hejiang County Library, Zhongjiang County Library, Guanghan City Library, Shifang City Library, Mianzhu City Library, Santai County Library, An County Library, Beichuan Qiang Autonomous County Library, Wanyuan City Library, Cangxi County Library, Shehong County Library, Nanbu County Library, Meishan City Dongpo District Library, Renshou County Library, Ziyang City Yanjiang District Library
Guizhou	Guiyang City Library, Zunyi City Library, Bijie City Library, Wudang District Library in Guiyang City, Baiyun District Library in Guiyang City, Kaiyang County Library, Meitan County Library, Xingyi City Library, Zhenfeng County Library, Renhuai City Library, Dafang County Library, Zhenyuan County Library, Duyun City Library, Weng'an County Library
Yunnan	Yunnan Provincial Library, Kunming City Library, Yuxi City Library, Chuxiong State Library, Dali State Library, Kunming Children's Library, Wuhua District Library in Kunming City, Guandu District Library in Kunming City, Xishan District Library in Kunming City, Anning City Library, Qilin District Library in Qujing City, Luliang County Library, Shizong County Library, Luoping County Library, Xuanwei City Library, Hongta District Library in Yuxi City, Yimen County Library, Tengchong County Library, Changning County Library, Yulong County Library, Linxiang District Library, Chuxiong City Library, Dayao County Library, Lufeng County Library, Xidu Library in Gejiu City, Kaiyuan City Library, Shiping County Library, Mile City Library, Luxi County Library
Shaanxi	Shaanxi Provincial Library, Tongchuan City Library, Baota District Library in Yan'an City, Shenmu County Library, Children's Library in Hanbin District
Gansu	Gansu Provincial Library, Lanzhou City Library, Jinchang City Library, Baiyin City Library, Xigu District Library in Lanzhou City, Ganzhou District Library in Zhangye City, Gaotai County Library, Huating County Library, Suzhou District Library in Jiuquan City, Tongwei County Library, Longxi County Library
Ningxia	Ningxia Library, Yinchuan City Library, Wuzhong City Library, Helan County Library, Pingluo County Library, Qingtongxia City Library, Zhongning County Library
Xinjiang	Ürümqi City Library, Karamay City Library, Changji Prefecture Library, Karamay City Dushanzi District Library, Jimsar County Library in Changji Prefecture, Bayingolin Prefecture Hejing County Library, Yarkant County Library in Kashgar Prefecture, Xinjiang Ili Kazakh Autonomous Prefecture Xinyuan County Library
Hainan	No libraries registered.
Qinghai	No libraries registered.
Tibet Autonomous Region	No libraries registered.

== See also ==
- National Library of China
- National first-grade museums of China
