= Dali Bai Autonomous Prefecture Library =

Library in Dali City, Yunnan, China

- 大理白族自治州图书馆
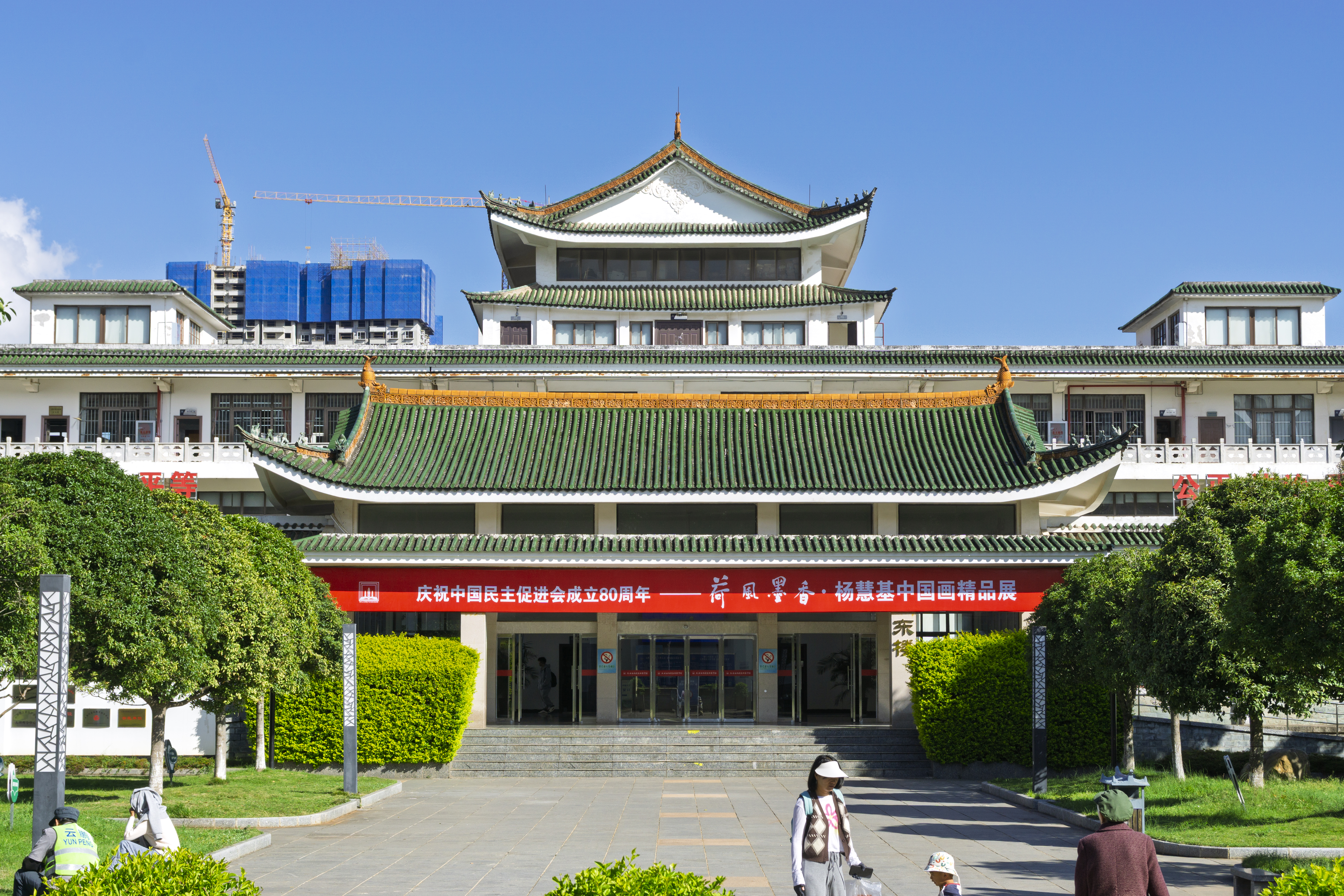
- 25°35′43″N 100°13′47″E
- Location: yunnan Dali City Dali Bai Autonomous Prefecture Xiaguan, Dali City. 53 zhon mountain road, China
- Established: 1 July 1957
- Branch of: Culture Bureau of Dali Bai Autonomous Prefecture

Collection
- Size: approximately 360,000 volumes

Other information
- Website: dalilib.cn

Dali Bai Autonomous Prefecture Library (Chinese: 大理白族自治州图书馆) is a public library located in Dali City, Yunnan, China. Administered by the Culture Bureau of Dali Bai Autonomous Prefecture, it serves as the prefecture's principal public library. The library was established in 1957 and was relocated to its current building in 1986. It has been designated a National First-Class Library under China's public library evaluation system. The library is known for its collections on the history and culture of the Nanzhao and Dali kingdoms and the Bai people. It also maintains a documentation center specializing in local historical materials from the Dali region.

== History ==
In 1956, the Dali Prefectural Commissioner's Office established a library in Xiaguan. On 1 July 1957, the Dali Bai Autonomous Prefecture Library was formally opened to the public, based on that collection. The library was temporarily closed during the Rectification movement in 1958, but reopened later that year after relocating to Wenhua Lane. In October 1960, all library staff were assigned to agricultural labor in Binchuan and Weishan, resulting in another temporary closure. The library resumed operations in April 1961.

Following the Cultural Revolution, the library was closed for six years and resumed services partially in 1973. By 1978, its holdings had reached 85,985 volumes. Due to insufficient space, the library suspended public services between 1979 and 1982 while continuing internal operations.

On 20 April 1985, construction began on a new library building on Cangshan Road in Xiaguan. The new facility was completed and officially opened on 16 November 1986. The building was designed by the Dali Prefecture Design Institute and incorporates architectural features inspired by traditional Bai residences and Chinese garden design. The complex adopts a traditional three-courtyard layout. Beginning in September 1995, the library expanded its use of computerized information-management systems.

== Collections ==
The library holds approximately 360,000 volumes. Its collections are particularly noted for materials relating to Nanzhao and the Dali Kingdom. The holdings include substantial collections of local gazetteers, geographical records, genealogies of major Bai clans, and works by local authors.

The library preserves 8,089 titles in 10,483 volumes of rare and traditional Chinese books, including thread-bound editions and facsimile reproductions. Among these are three rare editions comprising eleven volumes:

- Dili Yuanbenshuo, a four-juan work in four volumes compiled by Cao Jiajia during the Qing dynasty and reprinted in 1737 during the reign of the Qianlong Emperor.
- Sidian Huiyao, a four-juan work (three volumes extant) compiled by Ma Dexin and self-published in 1859 during the reign of the Xianfeng Emperor.
- Han Liu Wen Jingxuan, a four-volume collection of selected writings by Han Yu and Liu Zongyuan, annotated by Lü Liuliang and Lü Baozhong and printed by the Lü family school during the Kangxi period.

The collection also includes 75 historical local gazetteers in 822 volumes, comprising 24 provincial gazetteers (547 volumes), 46 prefectural gazetteers (237 volumes), and 5 geographical gazetteers (38 volumes). In addition, the library preserves 33 genealogies in 61 volumes, including 19 older genealogies and 14 revised editions.

== Building ==
The current library building occupies approximately 20,000 square metres of land, with a main structure covering more than 6,000 square metres. The architectural design incorporates traditional Bai residential elements and Chinese garden aesthetics, reflecting the cultural heritage of western Yunnan.

== See also ==
- Dali City
- Dali Bai Autonomous Prefecture
- Dali Kingdom
- Bai people
