= Yanbian Library =

Library in Jilin Province, China

Coordinates: 42°54′5.5″N 129°27′52.67″E

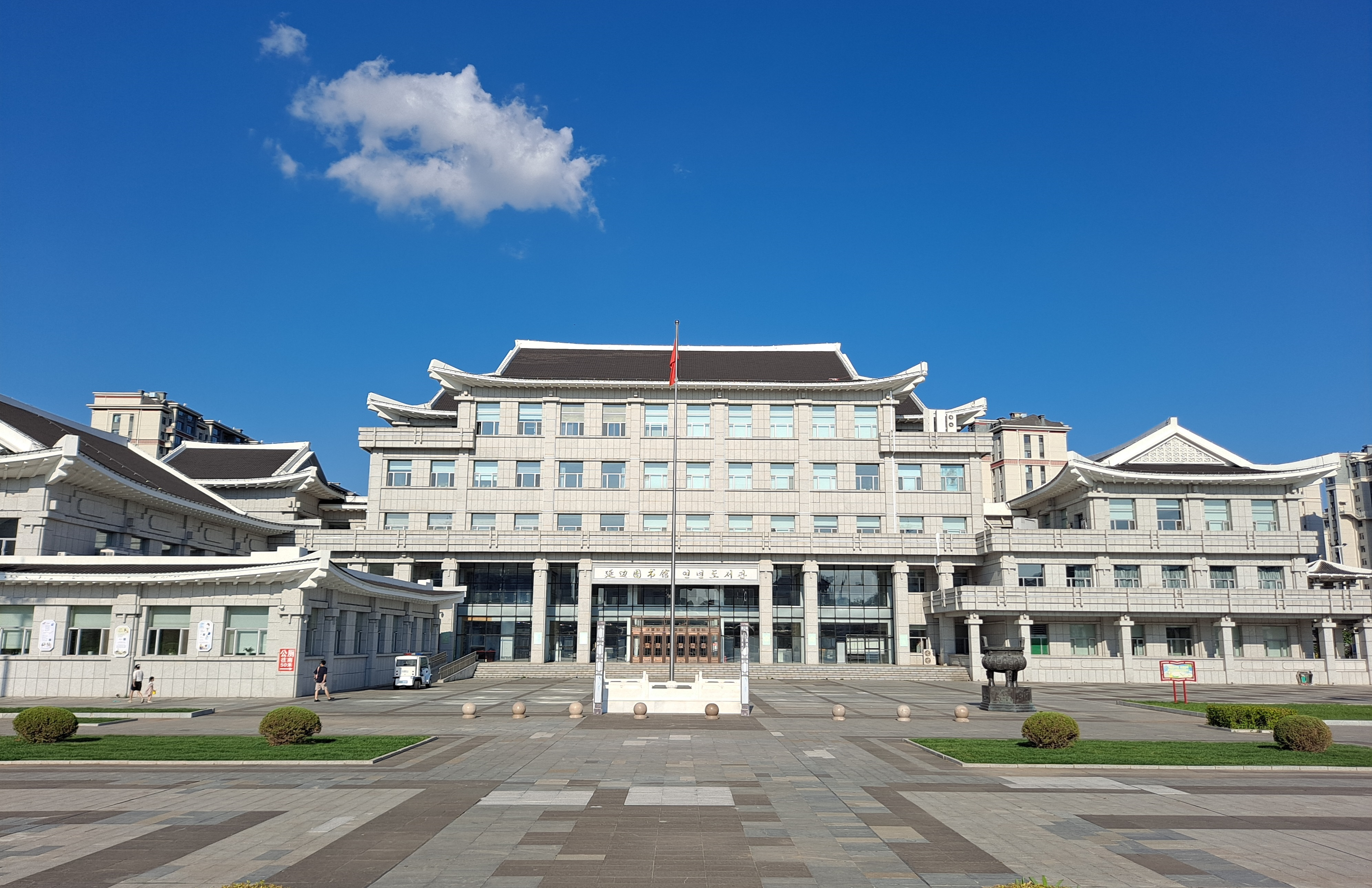
- Location: Yanji City, Yanbian Korean Autonomous Prefecture, Jilin Province, China
- Established: February 1949 (the initial); September 2012 (the new)

Collection
- Size: 400,000

Other information
- Director: Jin He
- Website: www.yblib.com.cn

Yanbian Library (Chinese: 延边图书馆; pinyin: Yánbiān Túshūguǎn, Korean: 연변도서관) is a library located in Yanji City, Yanbian Korean Autonomous Prefecture, Jilin Province, China. With a collection of over 80 thousand books in Korean, it is the largest and the only one Korean literature collection center in China.

== History ==
Yanbian Library was constructed in February 1949. People's Government of Jilin Province formally named the library as "Yanbian Library" on 6 January 1955. In order to solve the problem of saturation of the building, the library was moved to the western part of Yanji City in 2012.

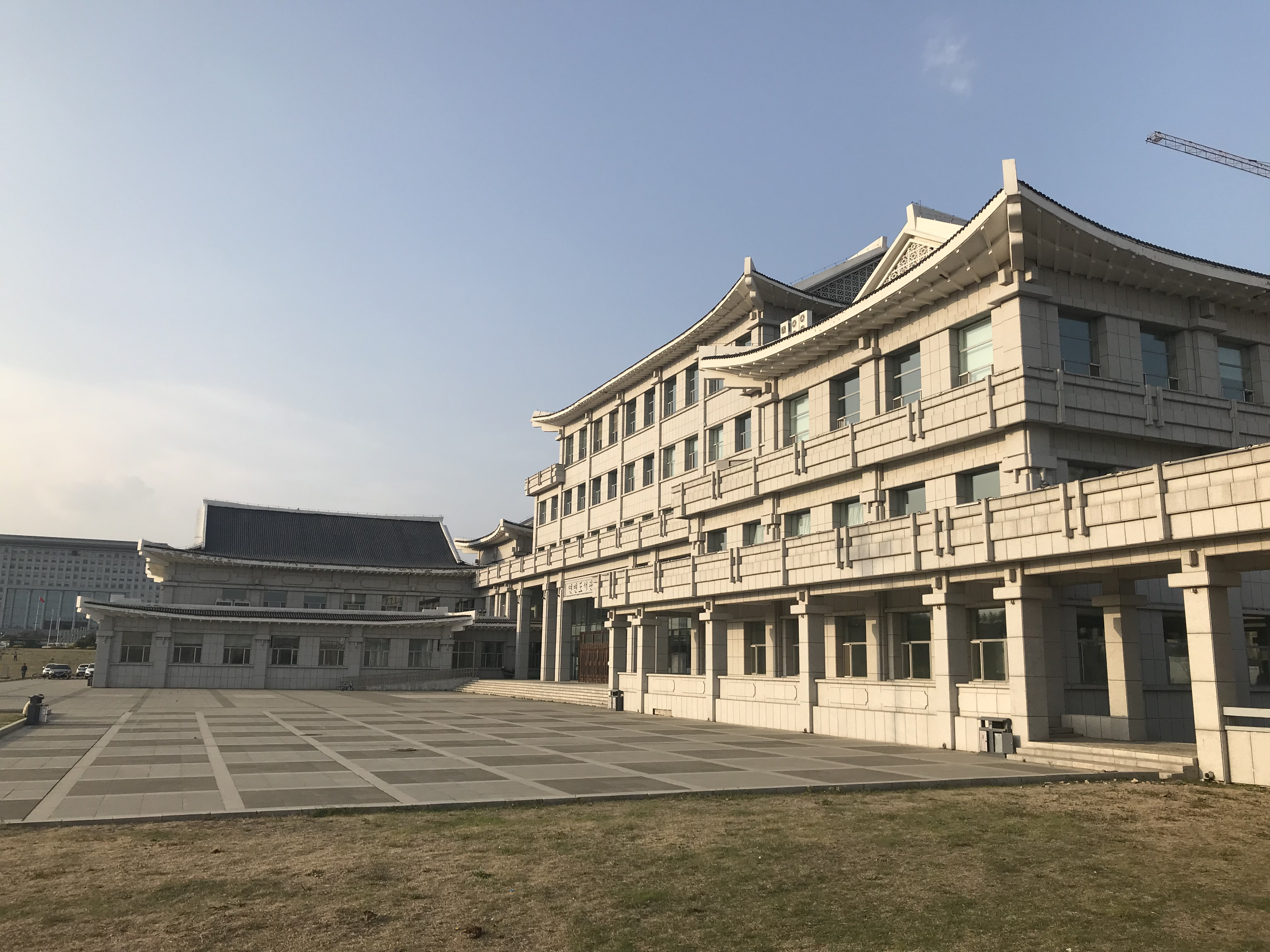
Yanbian Library

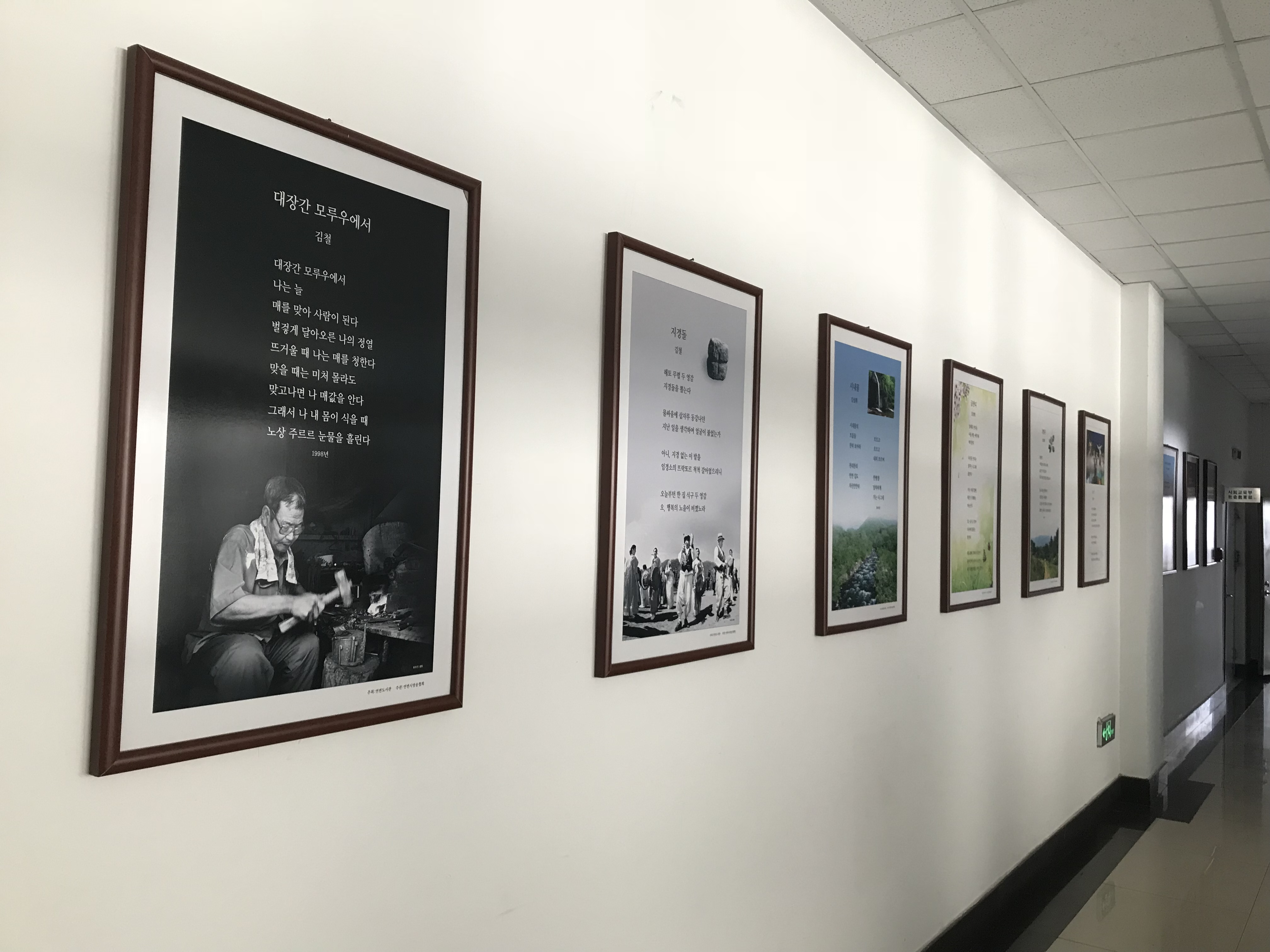
The Korean poems which showed in Yanbian Library

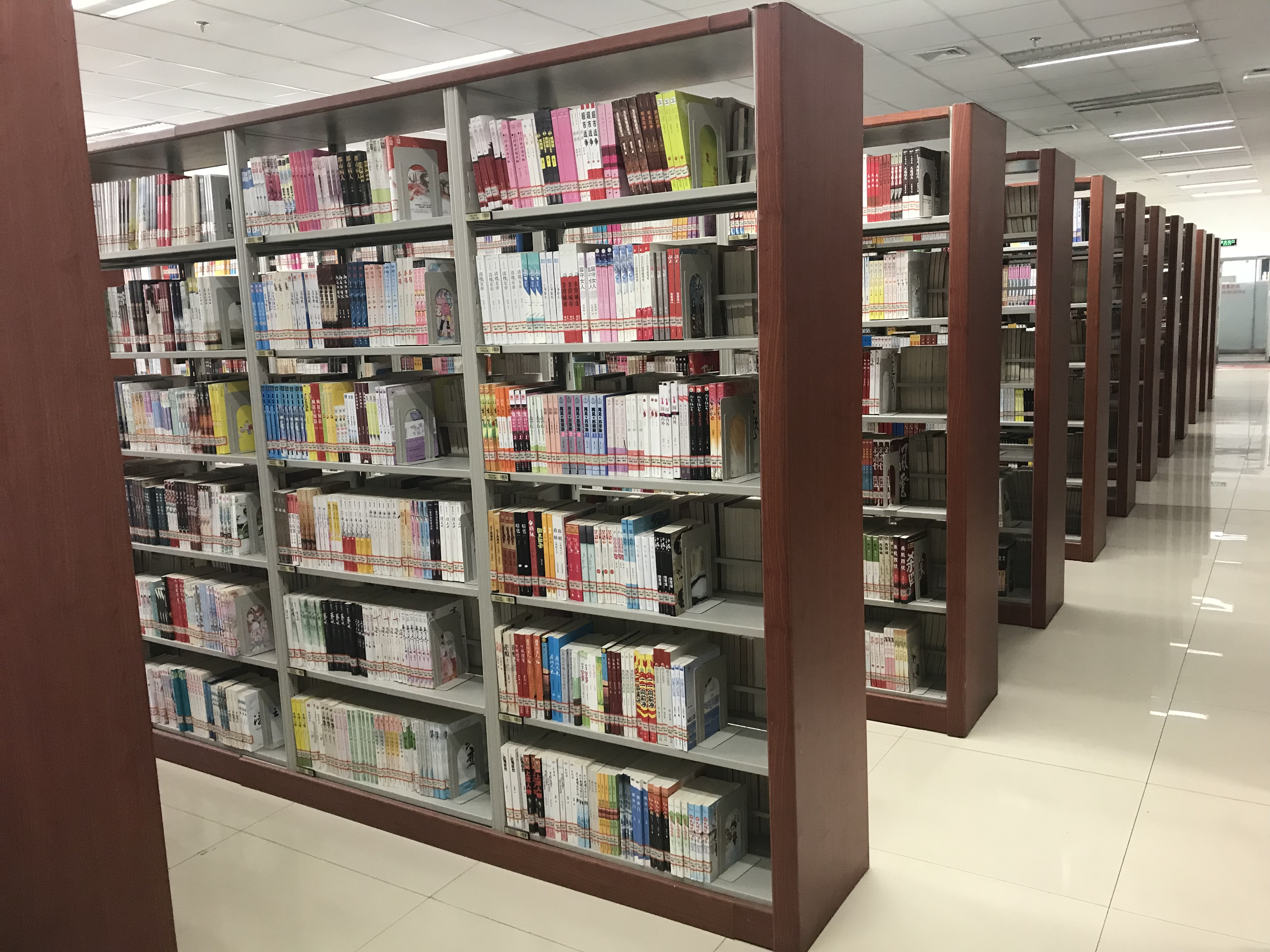
The Chinese General Reading Room

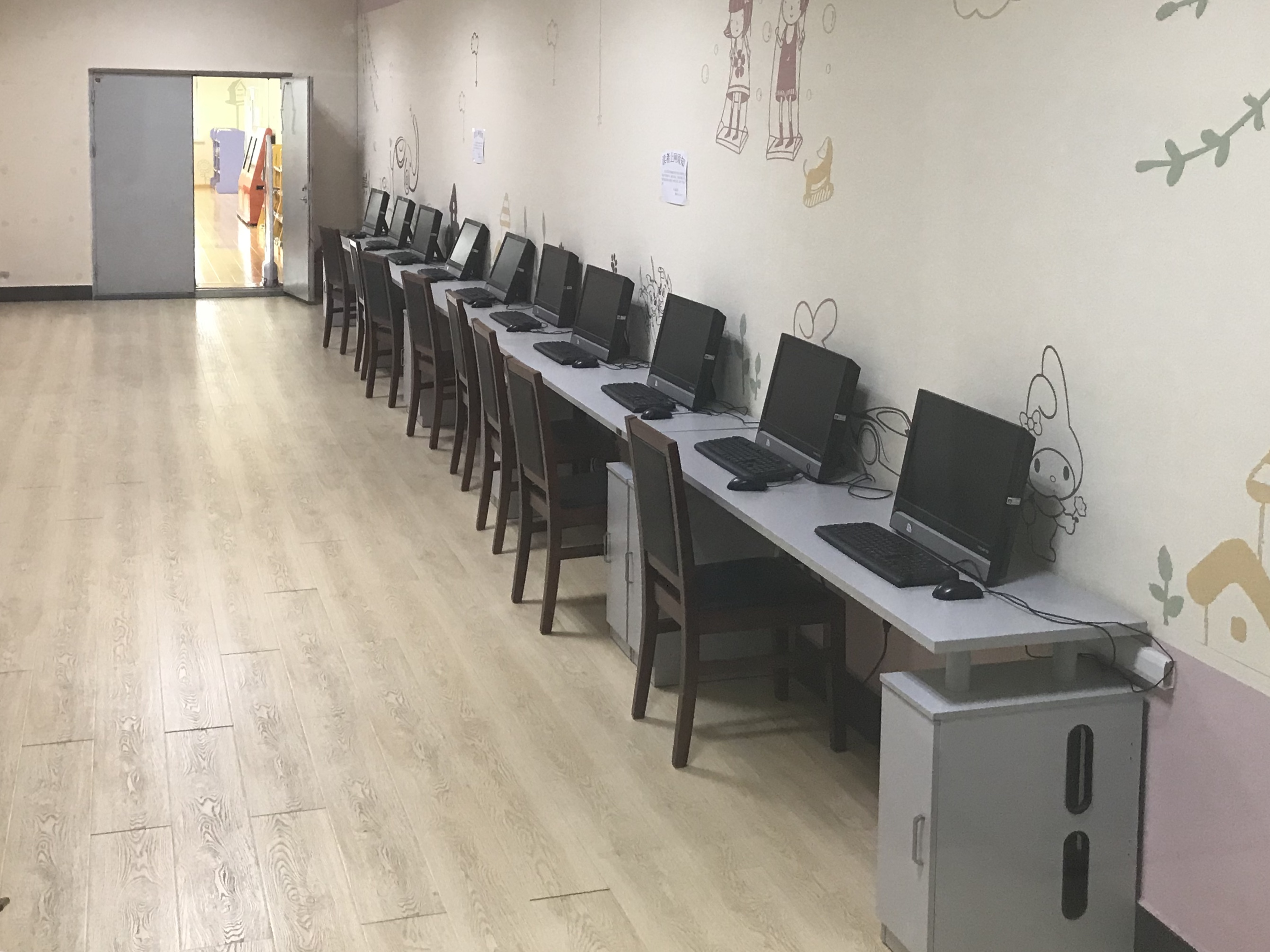
The Room for Parenthood

== See also ==
- National first-class library
- List of libraries in China
