= Dongguan library =

Library in Dongguan, China

Coordinates: 23.01340°N 113.75190°E

Dongguan Library (Chinese: 东莞图书馆; pinyin: Dōngguǎn Túshūguǎn) is a prefecture-level city public library in Dongguan, Guangdong province, China, opened on 28 September 2005. It has an area of 44,654 square metres (53,406 sq yd), the largest among prefecture-level cities. There are ten libraries and over 20 service points in Dongguan Library, including the first comic library in China.

== See also ==
- National first-class library
- List of libraries in China
