= Yunnan Provincial Library =

Public library in Kunming, China

- 云南省图书馆
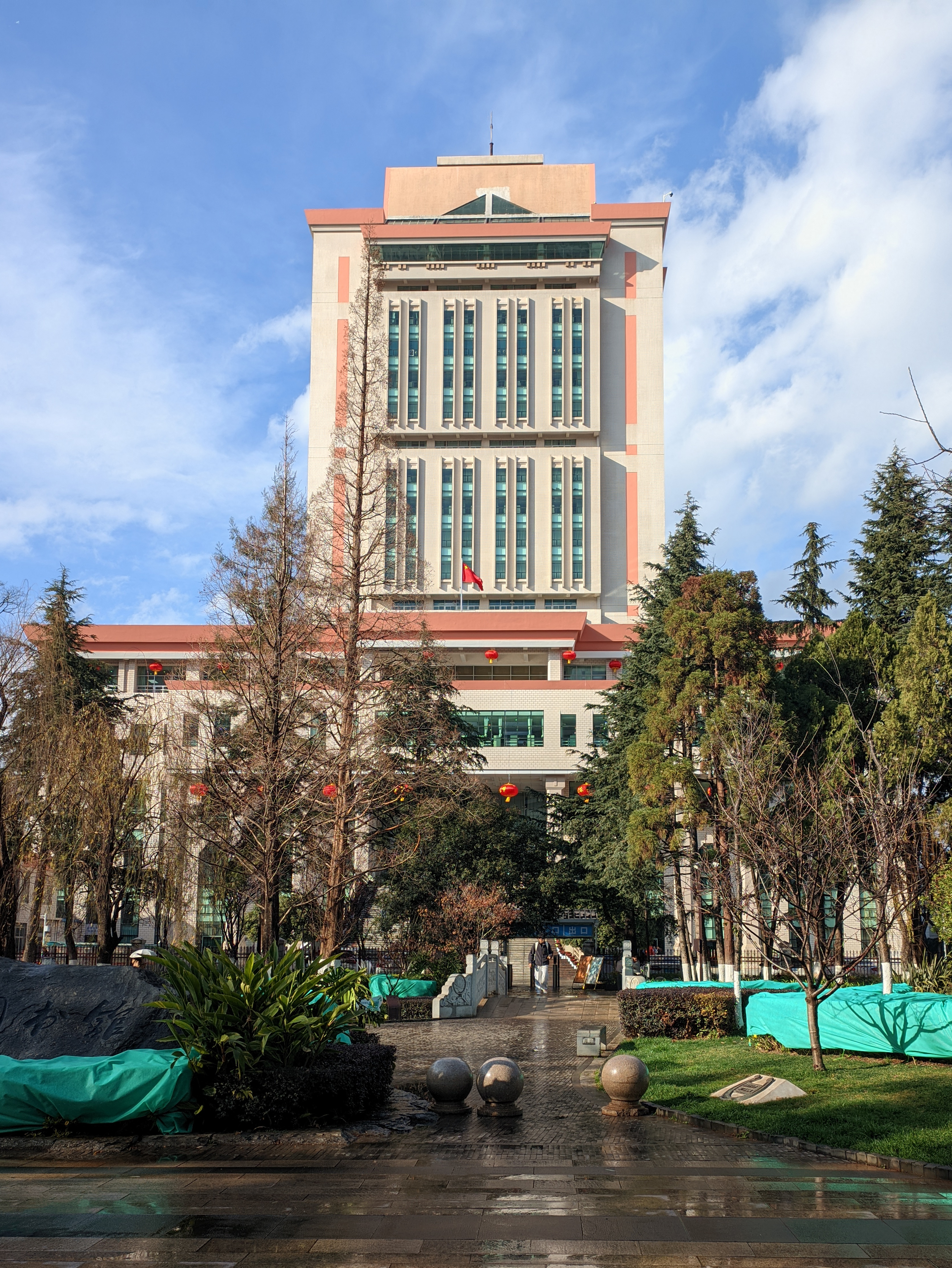
- 25.046323143109603°N 102.70084201640344°E
- Location: Kunming, China
- Established: 1909

Other information
- Website: www.ynlib.cn

Yunnan Provincial Library (YPL) (Chinese: 云南省图书馆), founded in 1909, is located in Kunming, China.

Yunnan Provincial Library was awarded Guust van Wesemael Literacy Prize 2005 by IFLA.

== Use ==
The library has been used as the venue for various events including Yunfest, an independent film festival with some international participation that focuses on Yunnan, neighbouring countries and regions.

== See also ==
- National first-class library
- List of libraries in China
