= Hangzhou Library =

Library in Hangzhou, China

- 杭州图书馆
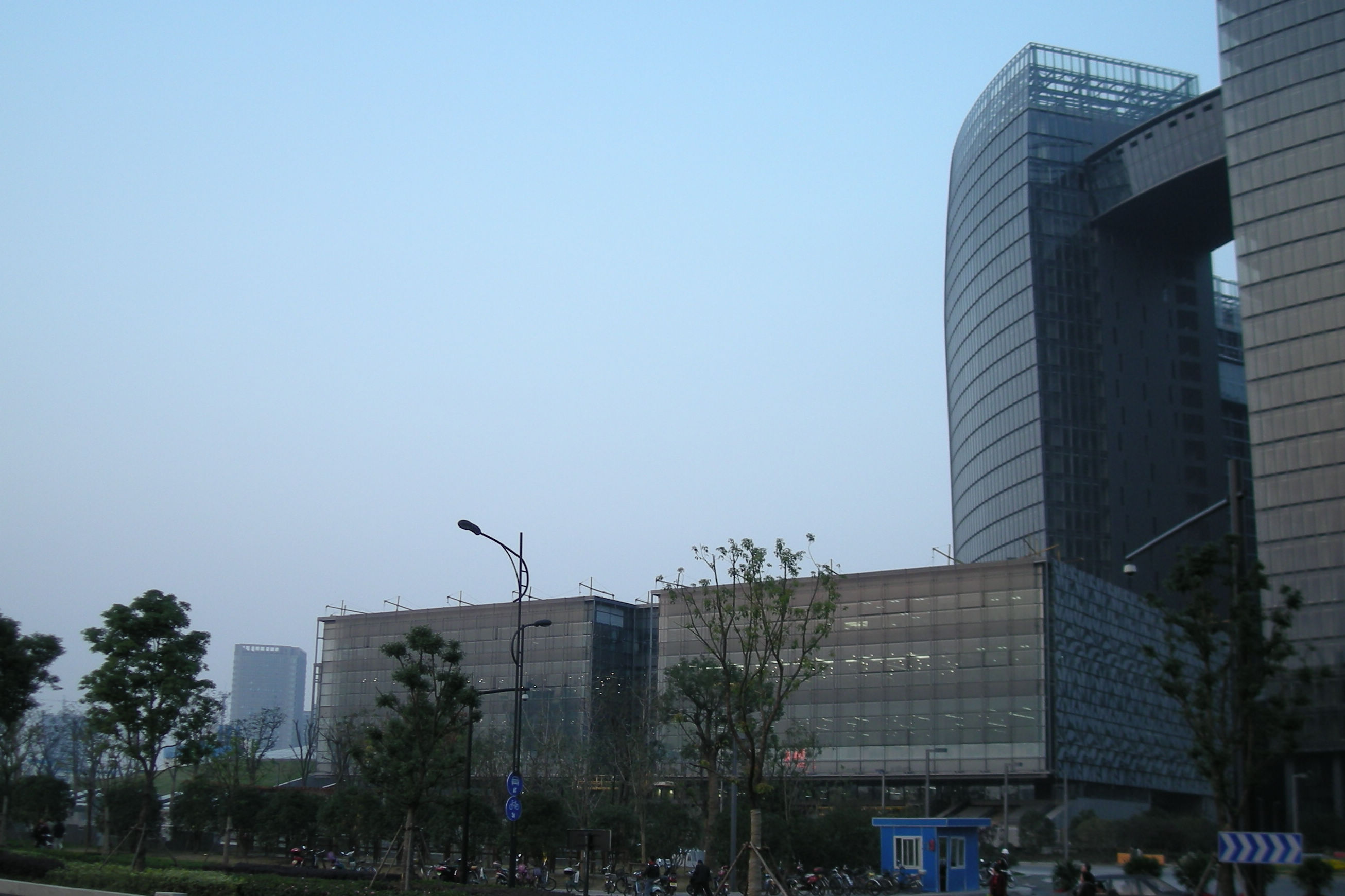
- 30°14′53.16″N 120°12′12.96″E
- Location: East Jiefang Road, Jianggan District, Hangzhou, Zhejiang, China
- Type: Public
- Established: 1958

Collection
- Items collected: 2.8 million items

Other information
- Website: en.hzlib.net

The Hangzhou Library (simplified Chinese: 杭州图书馆; traditional Chinese: 杭州圖書館; pinyin: Hángzhōu Túshūguǎn) is a public library located at East Jiefang Road, Jianggan District of Hangzhou, Zhejiang. Hangzhou Library has a collection of over 2.8 million items, with 31 thousand newspapers, 40 thousand Republic of China-era books, 5058 ancient books, and 1 thousand and 4 hundred rubbings.

== History ==
Hangzhou Library was established in July 1958 at Youth Road in Hangzhou.

In the mid-1980s, the library was relocated to Huansha Road.

In 1994, it was designated as a national first-grade library.

In 2003, it became a member of the International Federation of Library Associations and Institutions.

In October 2008, the Hangzhou Municipal Government appropriated 400 million yuan to construct the new library.

In 2010, the library was listed among the second batch of the "Key Protection Units of Ancient Books in China" by the State Council of China.

Hangzhou library has been noted for its early adoption of artificial intelligence technology in library services.

== See also ==
- List of libraries in China
