= Chongqing Library =

Public library in Chongqing, China

- 重庆图书馆
- 29.5352°N 106.4508°E
- Location: Fengtian Road, Shapingba District, Chongqing City
- Type: Public library
- Established: 1947

Other information
- Website: www.cqlib.cn

The Chongqing Library (shortly named the National Roosevelt Library from 1946 to 1949) is a large-scale comprehensive public library, located in Shapingba, Chongqing, China. The library was established in 1947, and was one of only five national libraries in China at the time. It is one of the two earliest United Nations document depositories in China.

In 1947, the National Roosevelt Library, the predecessor of the Chongqing Library, was established to commemorate former U.S. President Franklin D. Roosevelt's contributions to China during World War II.

On May 27, 2021, the Culture Officer of the U.S embassy in China, and the Economic Officer of the U.S. Embassy in China, with a delegation group, visited Chongqing Children's Library, also known as "Former Site of Roosevelt Library," to discuss the future direction of cooperation in culture and tourism between Chongqing and the United States.

== See also ==
- National first-class library
- List of libraries in China
