= Guangxi Library =

Public library in Guangxi, China

- 广西壮族自治区图书馆
- 22.81479616848576°N 108.33897925766281°E
- Location: Nanning, China
- Type: Public library
- Established: 1924

Other information
- Website: www.gxlib.org.cn

The Guangxi Library (simplified Chinese: 广西图书馆; traditional Chinese: 廣西圖書館), also known as the Library of Guangxi Zhuang Autonomous Region, is an autonomous region-level public library of the Guangxi Zhuang Autonomous Region of the People's Republic of China, located at No. 61, Minzu Avenue, Nanning City. It is the largest comprehensive provincial-level public library in Guangxi.

== History ==
The predecessor of the Guangxi Library was the Xuanhua Library built in 1924, renamed the Guangxi Provincial Second Library in 1931, the Second Library of Guangxi Zhuang Autonomous Region in 1958, and the present name in 1980.

== Notable holdings ==
In 1987, a collection of Bai Chongxi's speeches during his time in Guangxi in the 1930s, his correspondence with his colleagues and friends, as well as Mainland newspapers and periodicals before 1949, were discovered in the Guangxi Library.

== See also ==
- National first-class library
- List of libraries in China
