= Shaanxi Library =

Public library of Shaanxi, China

Coordinates: 34.233075°N 108.941063°E

Shaanxi Provincial Library
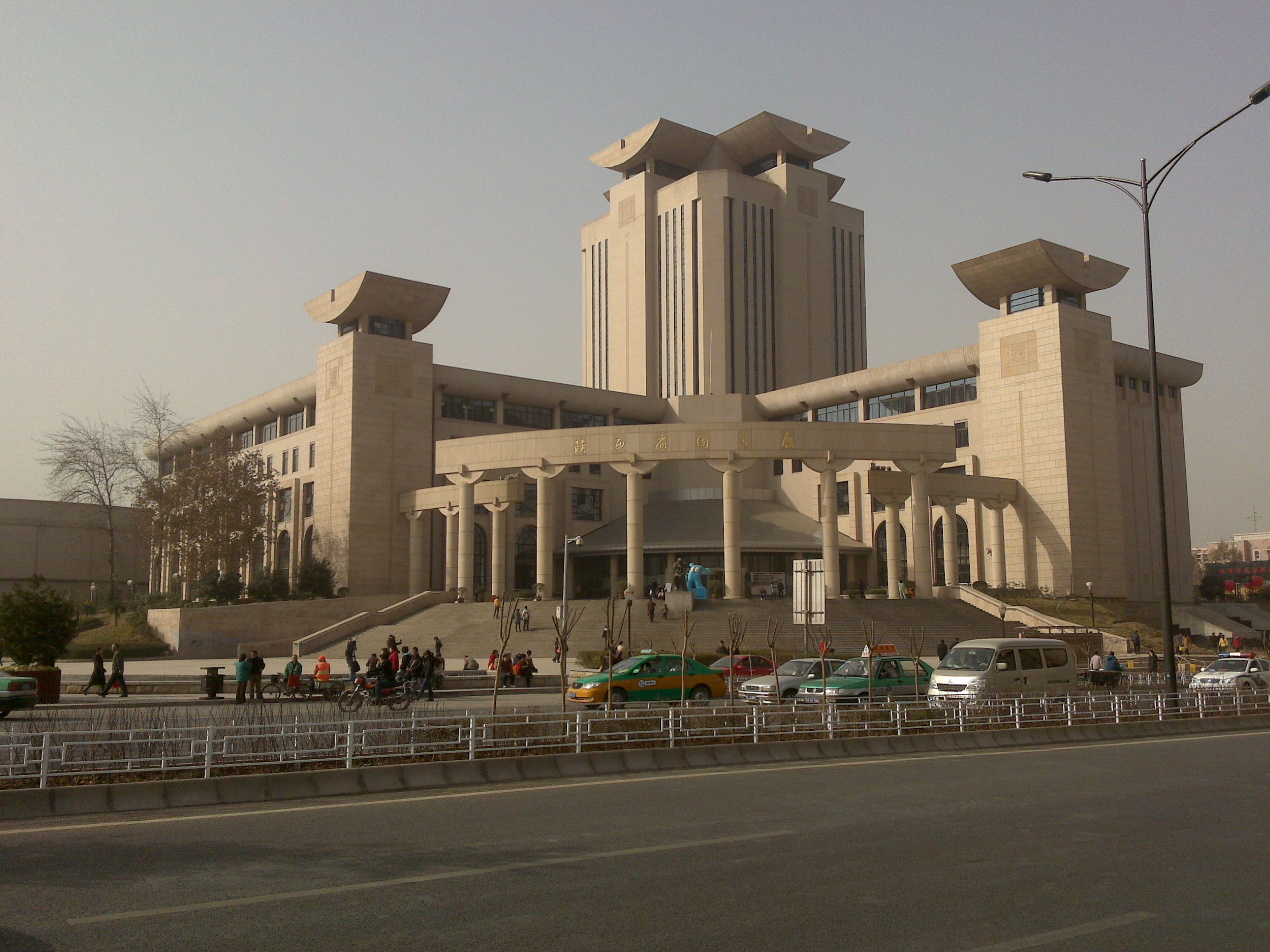
- Exterior of the library in 2010
- Location: No. 18, Chang'an North Road, Xi'an City
- Type: Public library
- Established: August 1909

Other information
- Website: www.sxlib.org.cn

The Shaanxi Provincial Library (simplified Chinese: 陕西省图书馆; traditional Chinese: 陝西省圖書館), also known as the Shaanxi Library, is a Xi'an-based large scale public library, located at No. 18, Chang'an North Road, Xi'an City. It is the earliest public library established in China's Western Region.

== History ==
Built in August 1909, the Shaanxi Provincial Library was one of the first public libraries established in China. On 30 September 2001, the New Hall of Shaanxi Provincial Library was officially opened to the public.

== See also ==
- National first-class library
- List of libraries in China
