= Shanxi Library =

Public library in Taiyuan City, China

Shanxi Provincial Library
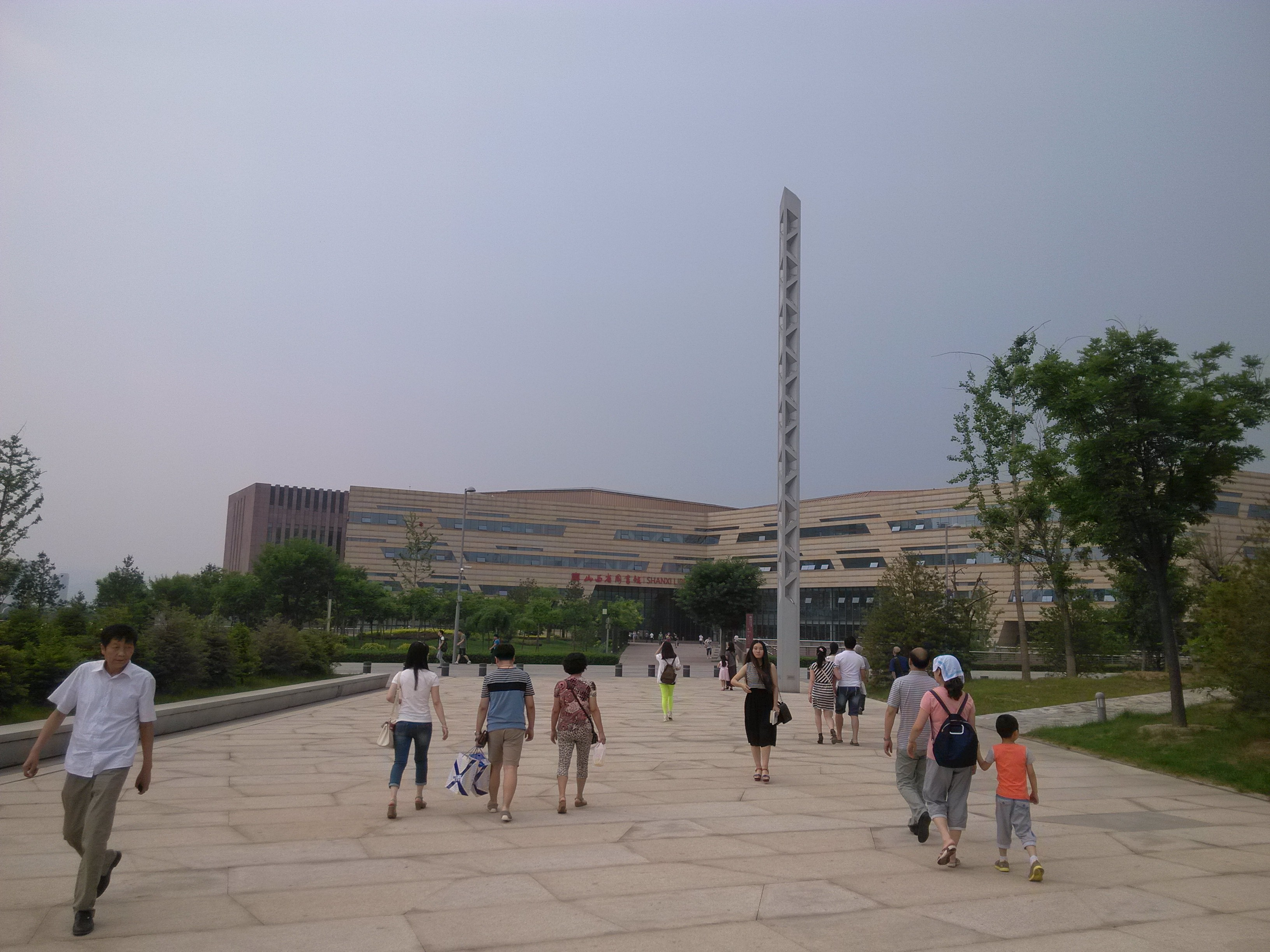
- Location: Changfeng Business Area, Taiyuan City, Shanxi, China
- Type: Public library
- Established: 1909

Other information
- Website: www.lib.sx.cn

The Shanxi Provincial Library (simplified Chinese: 山西省图书馆; traditional Chinese: 山西省圖書館), also known as the Shanxi Library, is a Taiyuan-based comprehensive provincial-level public library, located in Changfeng Business Area, Taiyuan City, Shanxi, China.

== History ==
The construction of the Shanxi Provincial Library began in 1908 and was completed in 1909. On 28 August 1960, the building of the Shanxi Provincial Library was inaugurated and opened to the public independently.

In July 2013, the New Hall of Shanxi Provincial Library was opened, with a total construction area of about 50,000 square metres and a total investment of 350 million yuan.

== See also ==
- National first-class library
- List of libraries in China
