= Hunan Library =

Public library in Changsha City, China

- Location: Changsha
- Type: Public library
- Established: March 1904

Other information
- Website: www.library.hn.cn

The Hunan Library (simplified Chinese: 湖南图书馆; traditional Chinese: 湖南圖書館) is a provincial comprehensive public library located at North Shaoshan Road, Changsha City, Hunan Province. The Library is the first provincial-level public library named after "library" in China. It is a National Key Protection Unit for Ancient Books in China.

== History ==
Hunan Library, formerly known as the Hunan Library and Education Museum, was built in March 1904 in Changsha.

On December 28, 2017, the New Hall of Hunan Library officially laid the foundation in Meixi Lake, Xiangjiang New Area, Changsha City.

== See also ==
- National first-class library
- List of libraries in China
