= Suzhou Library =

Public library in Suzhou, Jiangsu, China

- 苏州图书馆
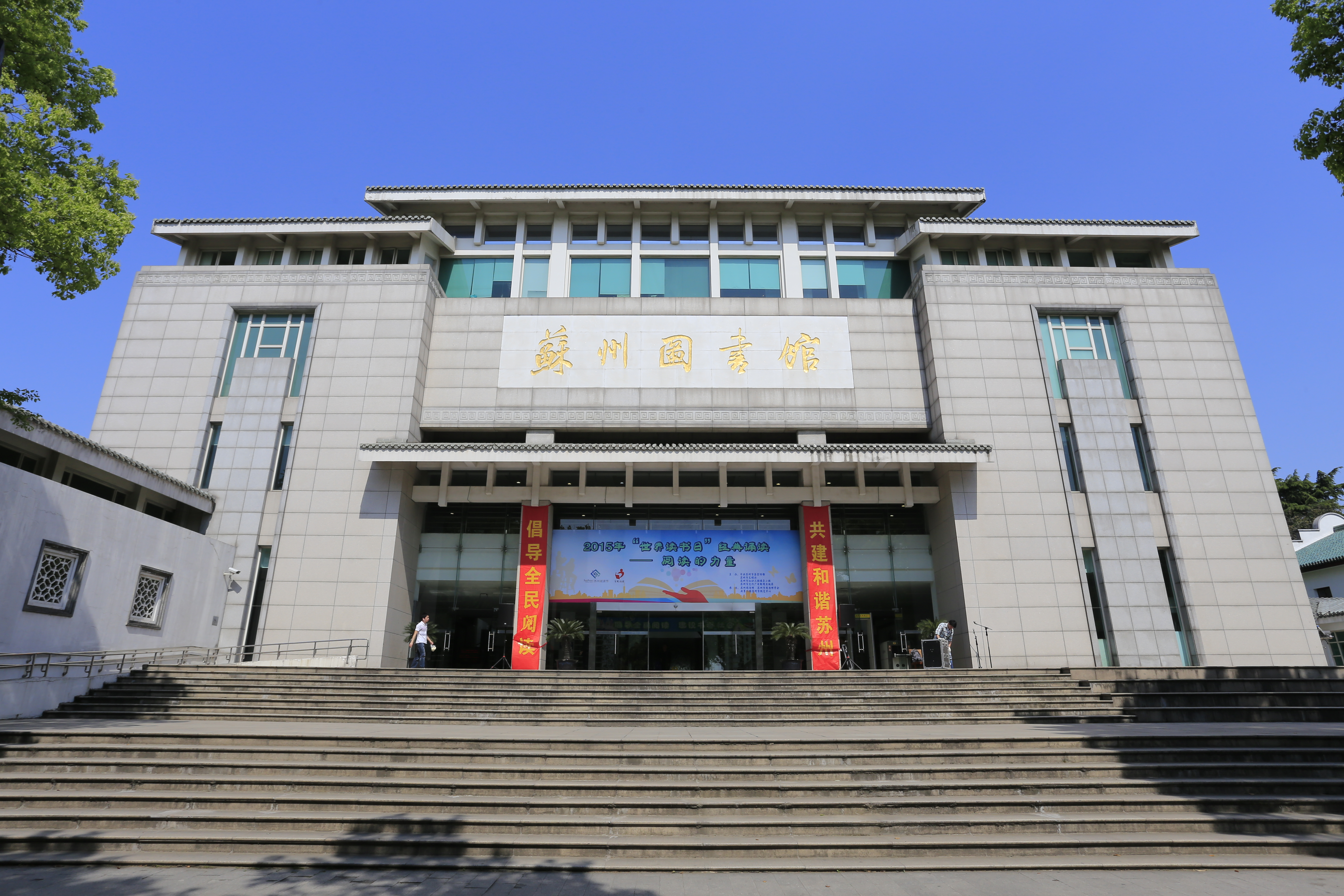
- 31°18′09″N 120°37′11″E
- Location: 918 Renmin Road, Gusu District, Suzhou, Jiangsu Province, China
- Type: Public library
- Established: 1914
- Branches: 88

Collection
- Size: 5 million volumes

Other information
- Website: Suzhou Library

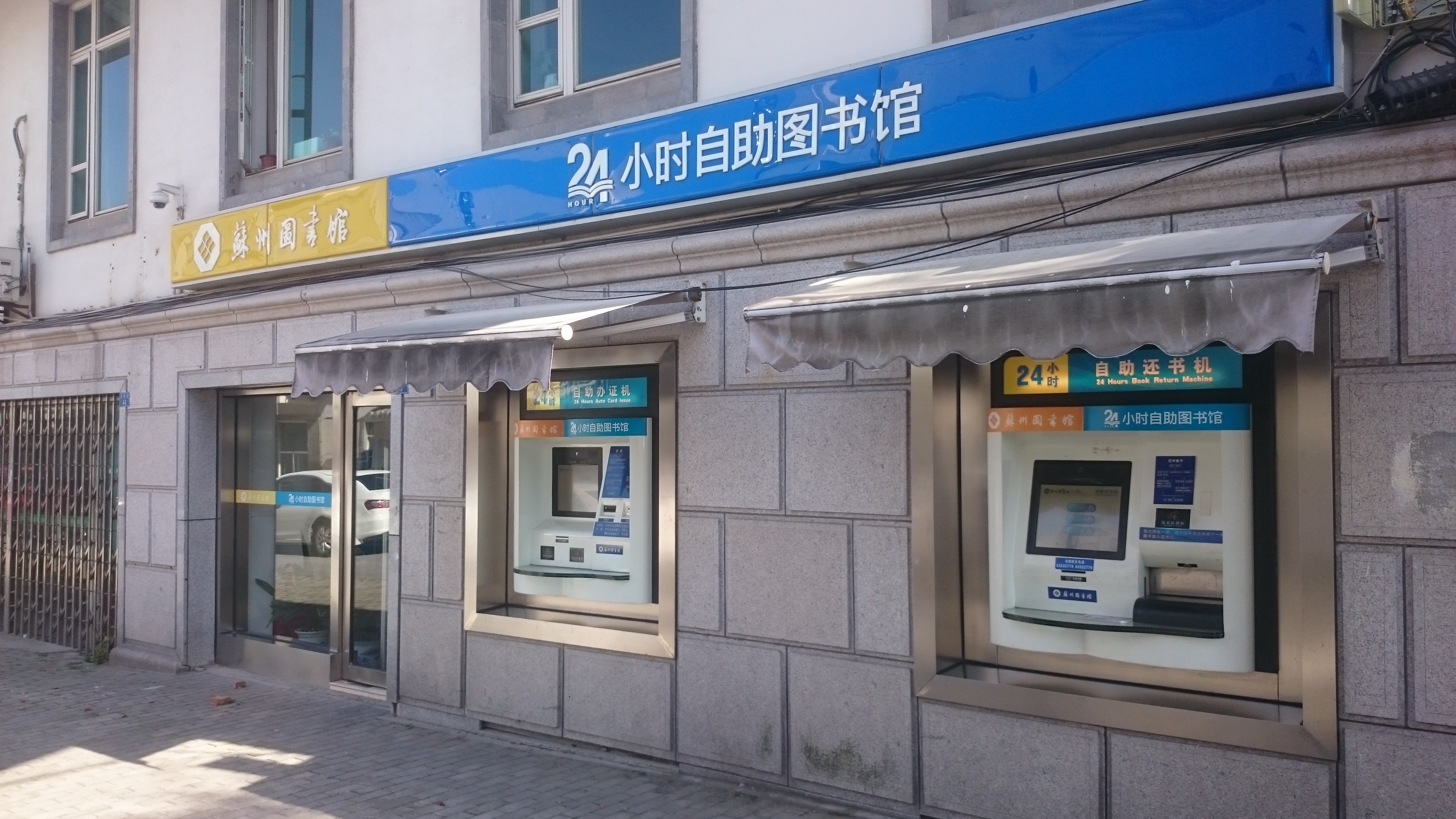
24-hour library

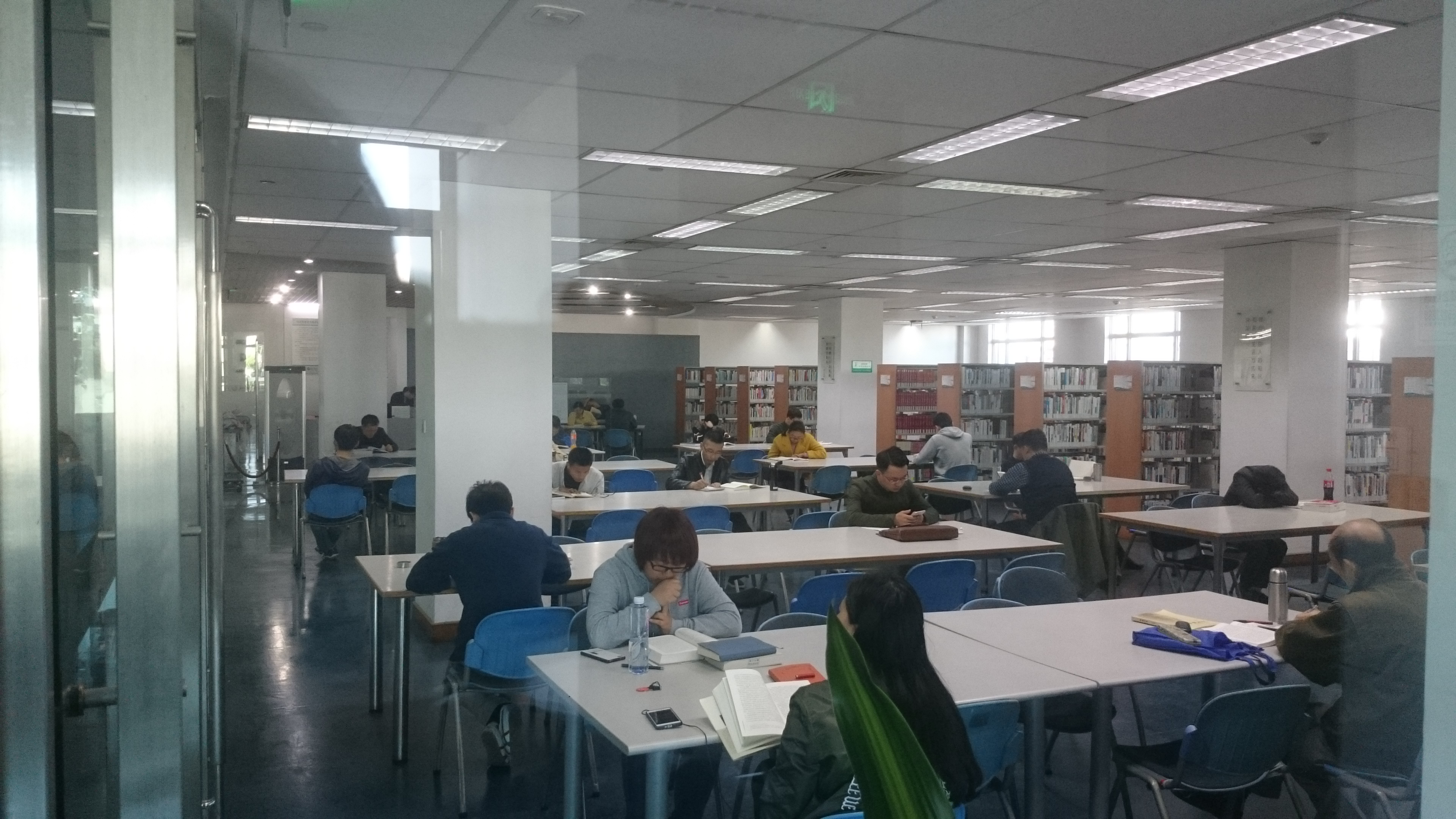
Social Science Reading Room on the second floor of the main building

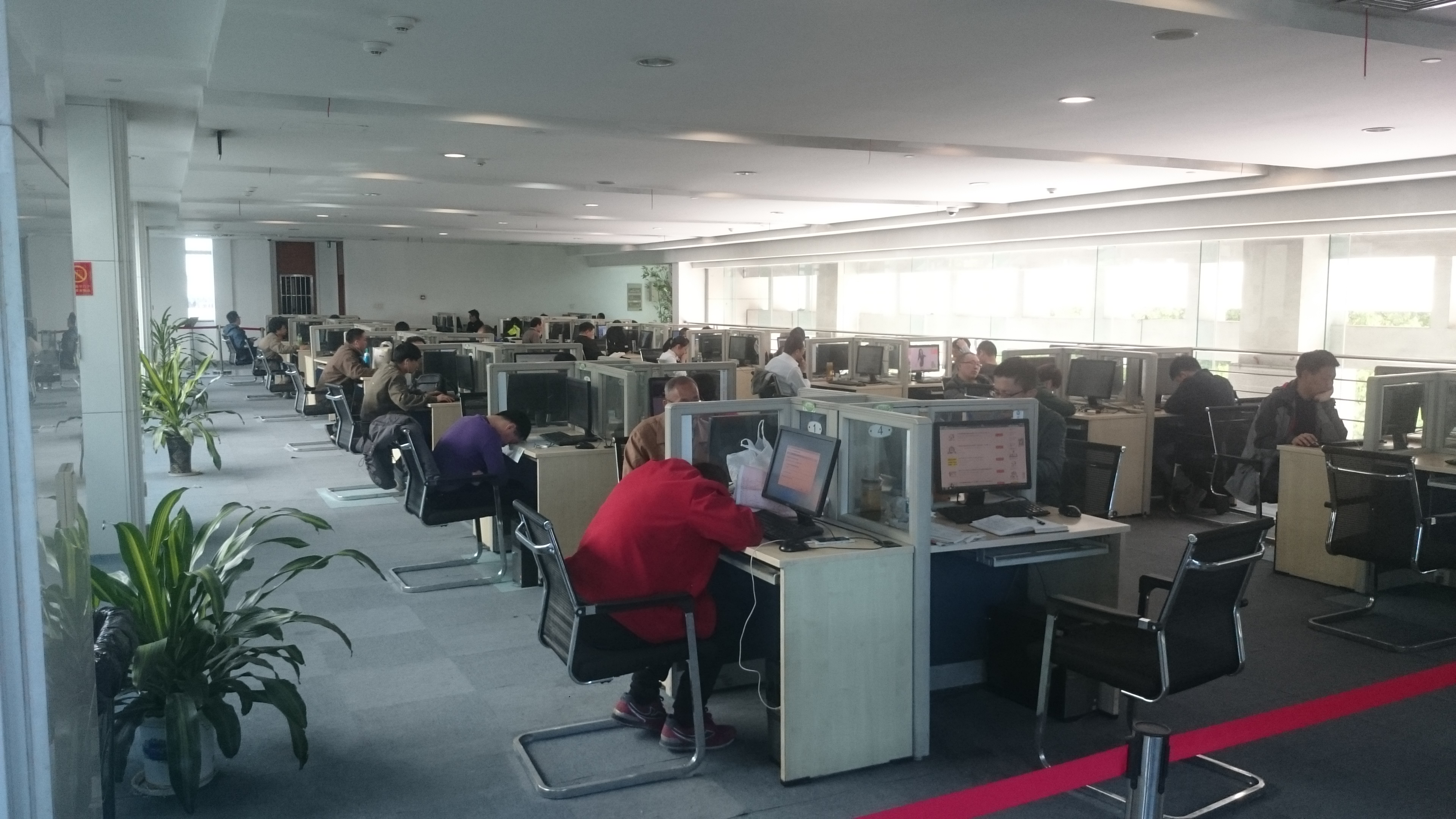
Electronic Reading Room on the second floor of the main building

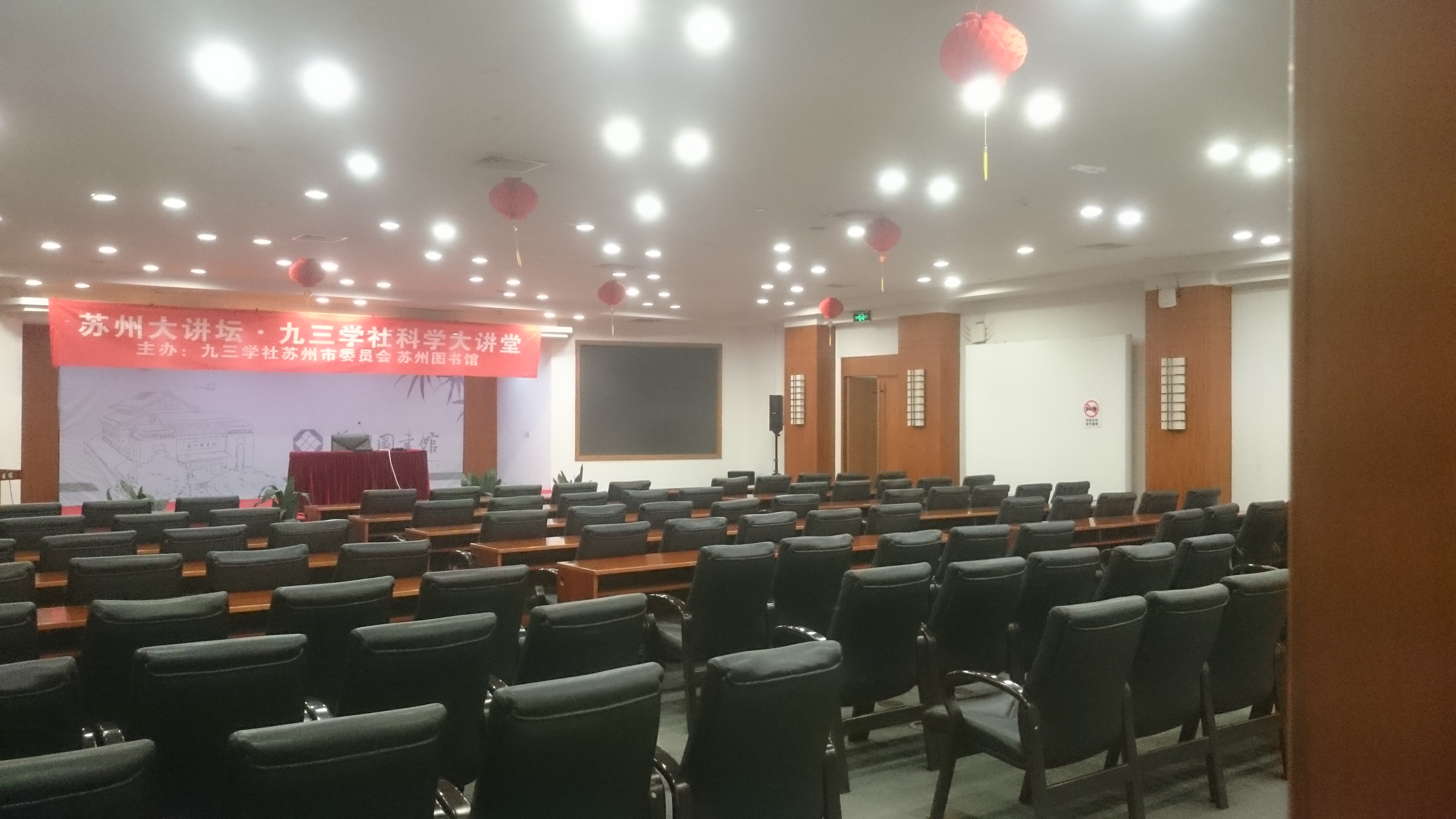
Multi-function conference hall

Suzhou Library (Chinese: 苏州图书馆; abbreviated as Sūtú) is a public library in Suzhou, Jiangsu Province, China. Founded in 1914, it is one of the earliest public libraries established in China, and is currently a National First-Class Library and a key national unit for the protection of ancient books. The main library is located at 918 Renmin Road, Gusu District.

Since the opening of its current main building in 2001, Suzhou Library has developed into a citywide library network through the "Suzhou Library Model", integrating branch libraries, community service points, mobile libraries, and 24-hour self-service facilities under a unified management and borrowing system.

== History ==
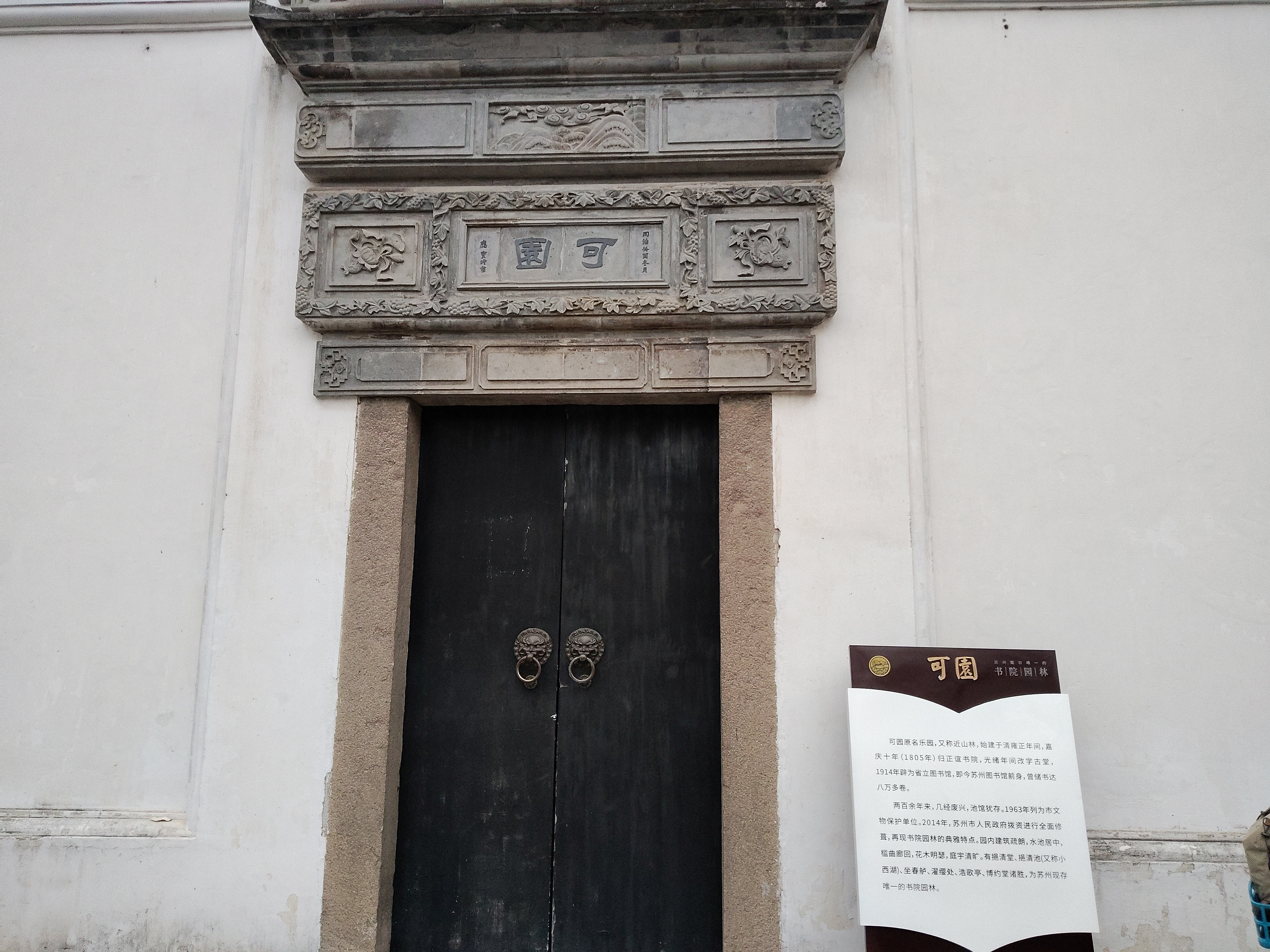
Former site of the Jiangsu Provincial Second Library

The public library in Suzhou was founded in 1914, originating from the Xuegutang of the late Qing dynasty's Zhengyi Academy. Initially named the Jiangsu Provincial Second Library, it was located at Canglang Pavilion Street in Ke Yuan. In 1929 it was renamed the Jiangsu Provincial Suzhou Library. Separately, in 1925 the Suzhou gentry member Xi Eming donated funds to establish a Suzhou Library at Suzhou Park, which was renamed the Wu County Library in 1930; together the two libraries held a combined collection of over 170,000 volumes. During the Japanese occupation, both libraries were either seized or destroyed in the fighting, and large numbers of books were lost. After the war, both libraries were restored and together held over 100,000 volumes. After 1949, the provincial library was renamed the Jiangsu Provincial Suzhou Library and the county library became the Suzhou Municipal Library; various smaller libraries were successively merged into the municipal library. In 1953, the Suzhou Municipal Library was merged into the Jiangsu Provincial Suzhou Library, bringing the combined collection to 197,500 volumes. In 1957 it was renamed the Suzhou Municipal Library. In 1958 it moved to 1 Gongyuan Road, and began purchasing books extensively to expand the collection. During the Cultural Revolution, books confiscated from the public were also stored in the Suzhou Library for safekeeping.

From 1949 onwards, book circulation stations were established to provide convenient access to reading for local cadres, workers, farmers, and others. By 1959, at their peak, there were as many as 100 circulation stations; from 1978 these were gradually phased out. Statistics from 1955 recorded 170,000 visitor visits and 170,000 book loans per year. By 1985, annual visits reached 420,000 and annual loans reached 950,000. Between 1949 and 1985, over 170 lectures and reports and more than 10 book exhibitions were organised. By 1986, the Suzhou Library's collection had grown to 1 million volumes, including 250,000 ancient books, as well as various Chinese and foreign periodicals, scientific and technical literature, and other materials. In 1993, the Rare Books Library was established in Xiangwang Lane. By 2005, the total collection had reached 1.23 million volumes and 450,000 types of electronic books; 7 community branch libraries had been set up, receiving 1.5 million visitors per year.

On 18 June 2001, the new Suzhou Library building on Renmin Road opened, covering a land area of 16,000 square metres and a floor area of 25,000 square metres. The new building includes a main lending area, the Tianxiang Xiaozhu, a children's library, exhibition hall, lecture hall, and other facilities, with over 1,200 reading seats. In addition to lending services, the library regularly organises exhibitions, lectures, and reading activities. From 2005 onwards, Suzhou Library began opening branch libraries in communities and townships across the city. Using a model in which government provides funding and premises while the library provides staff and management, a unified catalogue, unified records, and reciprocal borrowing and returning were established—a model that became known as the "Suzhou Library Model". By 2013, across the greater metropolitan area there were 8 main libraries and 173 branch libraries, achieving full coverage of all townships and districts. From 2006, mobile library vans began providing regular lending services to children in rural townships at fixed times and locations. In 2015, a "Cultural Pod" programme was developed, using compact, modular, reusable spaces with aggregated functions to bring diverse reading experiences to readers in different locations.

Following the opening of the new building in 2001, Suzhou Library launched the "Suzhou Grand Lecture Forum", with themes covering politics, economics, culture, society, and daily life. The forum has cumulatively held over 1,000 lectures, attended by more than 200,000 people in total.

From September 2008, Suzhou Library made its basic services entirely free of charge, no longer collecting registration or lending fees. Visitors may enter the reading areas directly without registering or presenting identification.

On 20 September 2014, Suzhou Library celebrated its centenary. On 15 September, the first 24-hour library opened at 46 Shijia Bay, on the north side of the main library building, offering reading, self-service library card registration, and book borrowing and returning services. Online reservation and community delivery services for borrowed books also commenced at this time.

In 2000, Suzhou Library was named a "National Model Library". In 2003, Suzhou Library joined the International Federation of Library Associations and Institutions as an institutional member. Suzhou Library is also the first Bookstart member library in mainland China.

On 26 June 2018, the library's "Little Migratory Bird" (小候鸟) programme, a special initiative for children of migrant workers, received the American Library Association President's International Innovation Award at the ALA Annual Conference.

== Current status ==
Suzhou Library currently comprises 1 main library and 85 branch libraries (including two 24-hour self-service libraries), 90 community book pick-up and delivery points, 2 mobile library vans, and 1 Cultural Pod unit. The main library is located at 918 Renmin Road, Gusu District, covering a land area of 16,000 square metres and a floor area of 25,000 square metres. The northern section of the main building houses the document lending area; the central section contains the Rare Books Library — "Tianxiang Xiaozhu"; and the southern section comprises the Knowledge Plaza, which is surrounded by an academic lecture hall, exhibition hall, community education and training centre, and children's library.

In 2018, Suzhou Library held a collection of over 5 million documents and items, received 12.277 million reader visits, and lent out 5.095 million volumes. In 2018, the library organised 2,320 events of various types.

In February 2016, construction began on the Suzhou Second Library in Xiangcheng District, with a total investment of 480 million yuan, a floor area of 45,000 square metres, and a designed capacity of 7 million volumes, with an expected opening to the public in 2019.
