= Hebei Library =

Library in Shijiazhuang, Hebei, China

- 河北省图书馆
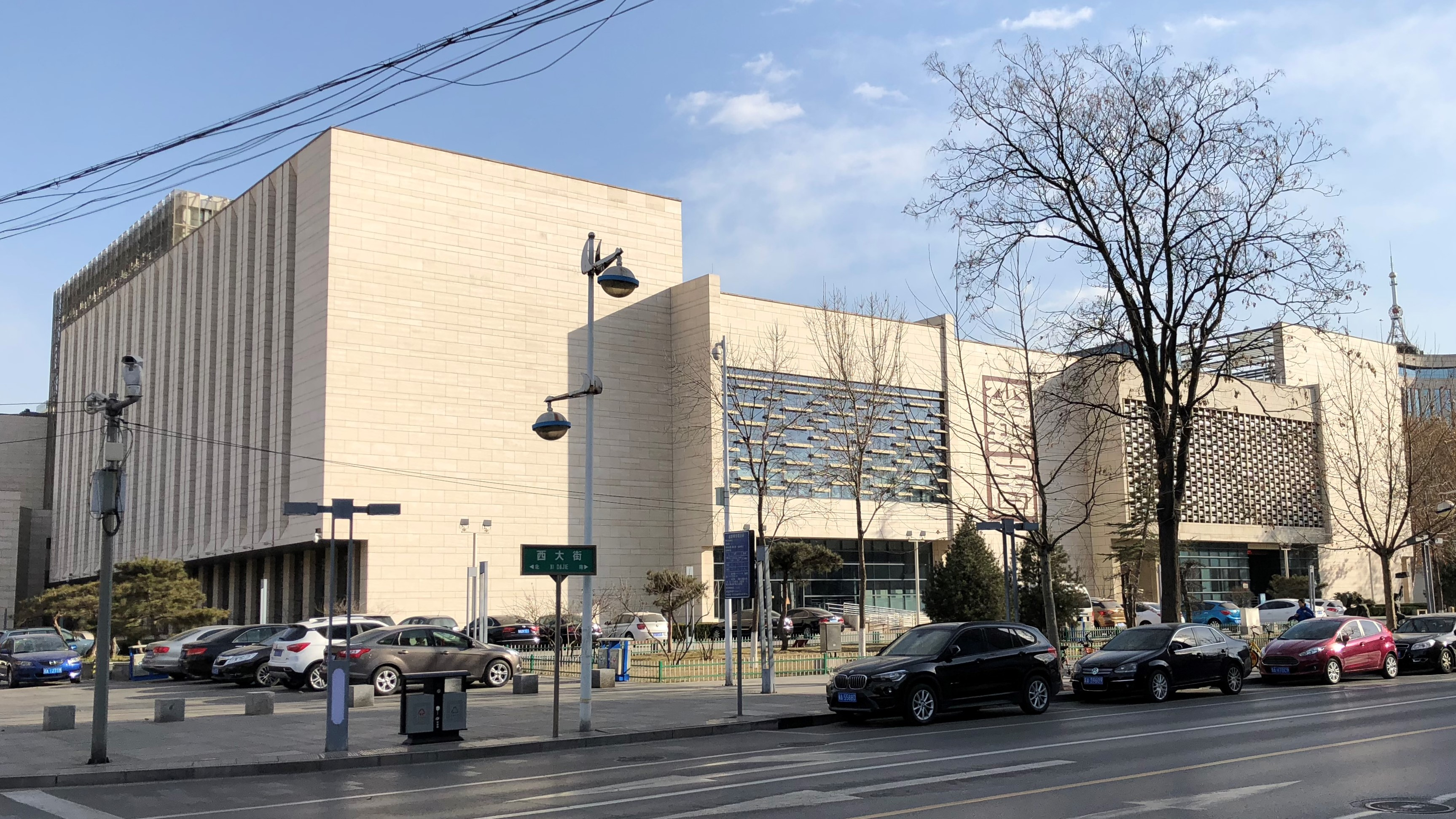
- 38.0380°N 114.5167°E
- Location: Baoding, Hebei, China (until 1961); Shijiazhuang, Hebei, China
- Established: November 1909 (established in Baoding); October 1987 (reestablished in Shijiazhuang)

Access and use
- Population served: Public

Other information
- Website: Official website

Hebei Library (Chinese: 河北省图书馆) is a library located in Shijiazhuang, Hebei, China. The library first opened in 1909, changed its name and location several times since then, and also did not exist from 1961 to 1987 (although the building still exists). In 2018, the library was recognized as a national first-class library.

== History ==
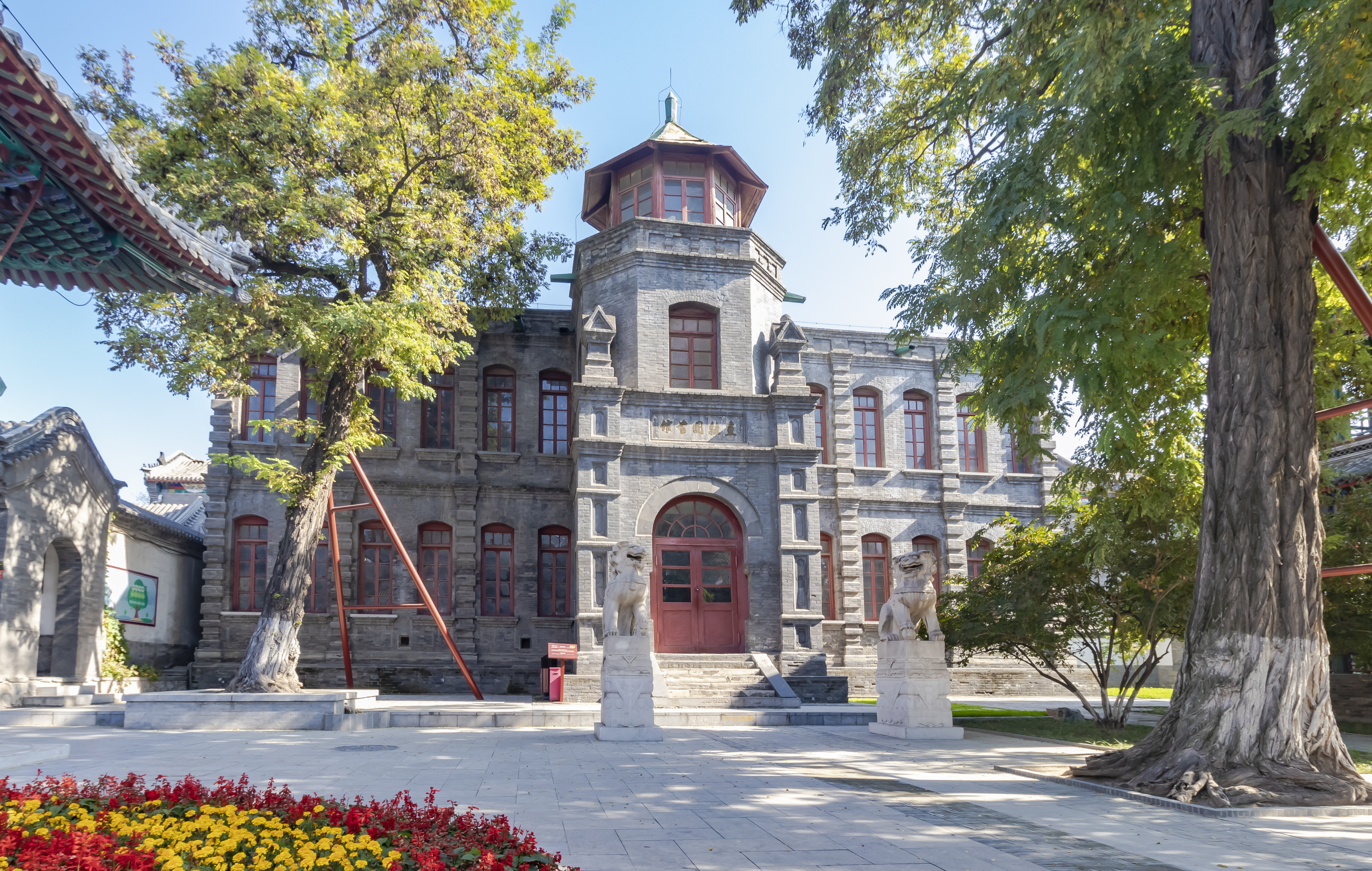
The former building of the library, located in the Lotus Pond in Baoding

In June 1908, Yang Shiqiang, the governor of Zhili, ordered to rebuild the Lotus Pond in Baoding and established a library on it, and another official, Lu Jing, personally inscribed the name of the library as "Zhili Library". In November 1909, the library was officially opened to the public. This makes the library one of the first libraries in northern China.

Between 1912 and 1928, as China entered the Warlord Era, the library developed very slowly and was often garrisoned, and in September 1918, by order of the Department of Education of Zhili Province, the name of the "Zhili Library" was changed to the "Second Zhili Provincial Library".

In 1928, as Zhili was renamed Hebei Province, the library was also renamed the "Second Library of Hebei Province". In 1932, due to the Japanese invasion of Manchuria, the library was renamed again to "Hebei Provincial Baoding Public Education Center", and in 1937, after the Marco Polo Bridge Incident, the library was devastated by the Japanese army, but due to the formation of a maintenance committee by the local gentry, the damage was not significant. In December 1937, the name was changed again to "Baoding Lotus Pond Library", and the following year, the Provisional Government of the Republic of China requested that the name be changed to "Hebei Provincial Baoding Lotus Pond Library". In 1945, after the surrender of Japan, the name was changed to "Hebei Provincial Lotus Pond Library". At the beginning of 1948, the name was changed to the "Hebei Provincial Baoding People's Education Center"

On November 22, 1948, the Chinese Communist Party took over the library. 3 days later, the name was changed to "Reading Department of Hebei Baoding People's Education Hall" and reopened. The following month, it was renamed again, as "Baoding People's Education Center".

In 1958, the capital of Hebei Province was moved to Tianjin, and the library's premises, equipment, and collection were all transferred to the Baoding municipal government. In August, the Baoding Municipal Library merged with the Hebei Library, and the Hebei Library became an institution with two names. In 1961, the Bureau of Culture of Hebei Province announced that it would abolish the name of the Hebei Library. From then on until 1987, the Hebei Library did not exist.

In October 1987, the library was restored in Shijiazhuang. In the 2000s, it was closed again for the expansion of the library building, and the library did not reopen until 2011.

On May 14, 2018, the library was recognized as a national first-class library.

== Buildings ==
The new building, completed in 2011, covers an area of 50,000 square meters, with more than 30 service windows and 3,500 reading seats. The library area is fully covered by wireless network and radio-frequency identification has been introduced to help find books.

When it was built in 1909, the library covered an area of 235 square meters. The building was used until 1958, at which time the library was moved to Nanmadao, West City of Baoding.

== Collection ==
As of 2016, the library has a collection of over 3.2 million books.

== See also ==
- List of libraries in China
