= Capital Library =

Municipal public library in Chaoyang, Beijing, China

- 首都图书馆
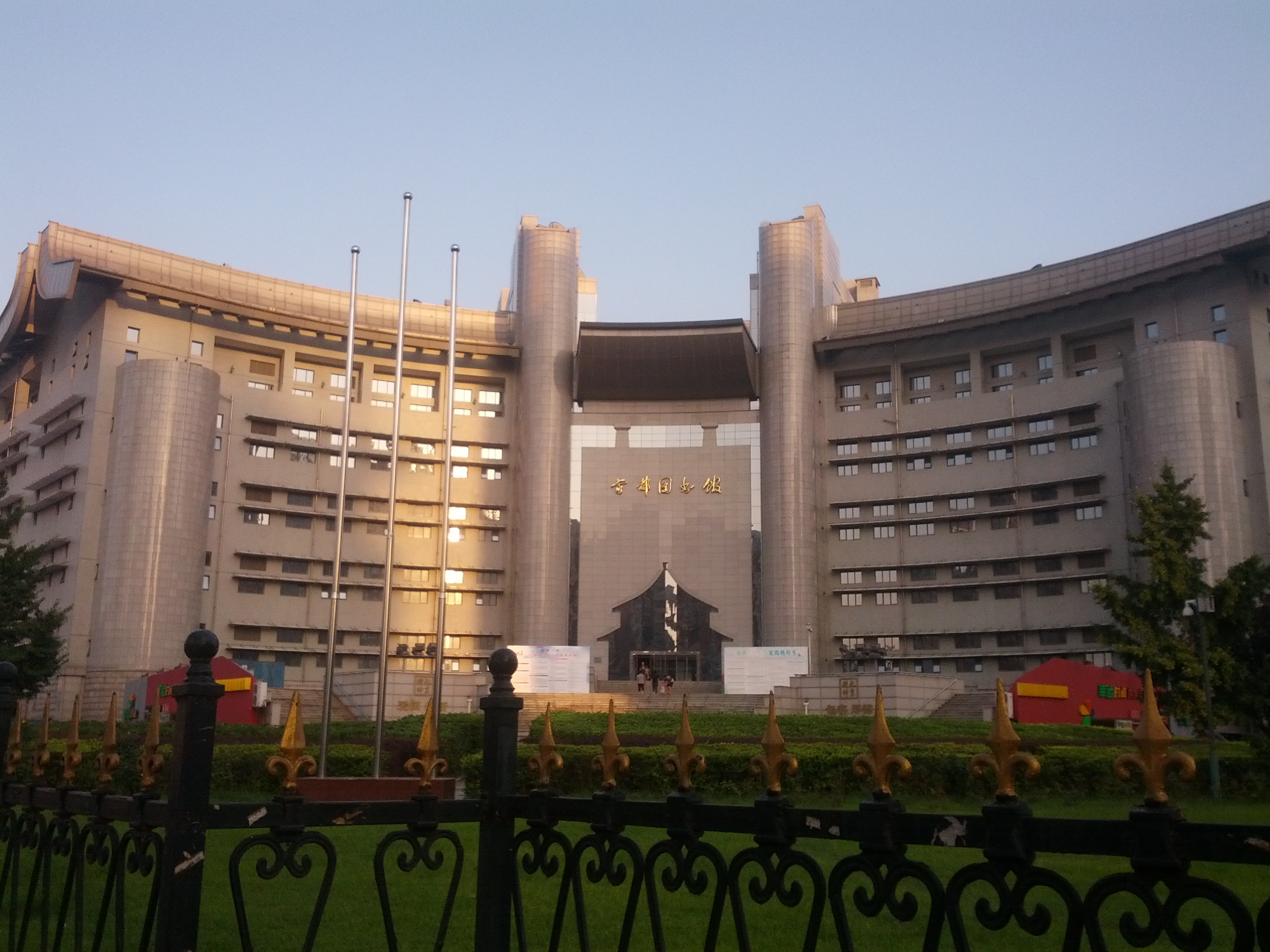
- 39.870390732157176°N 116.46323800261771°E
- Location: Chaoyang, Beijing, China
- Type: Public library
- Established: 1913

Other information
- Website: clcn.net.cn

The Capital Library (CLCN) is a municipal public library in Chaoyang, Beijing, China. The library is noted for its collection of Chinese opera, classical music, drama and theater.

== History ==
Founded in 1913 by Lu Xun, Capital Library evolved from the merger of the Capital Books Branch, the Capital Popular Library and the Central Park Library Reading Office, which were respectively established in June 1913, October 1913 and August 1917.

After the Revolution of the Northern Expedition, these three libraries were renamed and merged several times and changed to the Beijing Municipal No. 1 Library. In August 1949, it was renamed the Beijing Municipal Library. In October 1956, the library was renamed the Capital Library.

On November 1, 2013, after the National Library of China succumbed to government pressure, the Capital Library accepted a lecture by Australian historian Ross Terrill, who delivered a speech on the theme of "Mao Zedong in the Eyes of a Biographer: His Life, Personality and Ideology".

== Architectural design and facilities ==
The Capital Library of China is located on the east side of Huawei Bridge on the East Third Ring Road in Chaoyang District, Beijing, southeast of Andingmen and west of the Temple of Literature. As a comprehensive large-scale public library under the jurisdiction of Beijing Municipality, it comprises several departments, including the Office, General Affairs Department, Editorial Department, Reading Department, Science and Technology Department, Social Science Reference Department, Book Preservation Department, and Research Assistance Department.

== Resource Construction ==
The Huawei Bridge Branch of the Capital Library of China features a Local Literature Reading Room and an Information Archive, offering services such as local literature access, government information inquiries, and database resources, facilitating readers' access to various local information.

The Capital Library of China provides a comprehensive and multi-level range of cultural and information services to the public, including document lending, information consultation, lectures and forums, exhibitions, and exchanges, as well as cultural and recreational activities. The Capital Library of China was designated as a "National First-Class Library" by the Ministry of Culture of the People's Republic of China, It is also among the first batch of "National Key Preservation Institutions for Ancient Books".

== Historical development ==
The establishment of the Capital Books Branch, the Capital Popular Library, and the Central Park Library Reading Office was all guided by Lu Xun. Among them, the Capital Popular Library was the first library in China open to the general public after the Xinhai Revolution. The Capital Library of China evolved through multiple mergers of these three libraries.

In 2003, the library initiated the "Beijing Memory" project, a digital endeavor aimed at preserving and showcasing the local history and cultural heritage of Beijing.

A new building for the Capital Library of China was inaugurated on May 1, 2001, in Chaoyang District, Beijing. In 2004, the Beijing Children's Library was merged into the Capital Library of China, further enhancing its service functions.

On July 28, 2021, the Daxing Airport Branch of Capital Library, jointly built by Capital Library and Beijing Daxing International Airport, was officially opened. Daxing Airport Branch Library is the first "airport library" in China, covering an area of nearly 500 square meters, with a collection of more than 10,000 volumes, more than 200,000 electronic books, and more than 1.5 million music pieces, and provides free "Beijing Memory" and "Beijing Collection" and other 18 database viewing services.

On January 10, 2022, the Capital Library of China and the Beijing Lu Xun Museum reached a strategic cooperation agreement and signed a framework agreement. A book donation ceremony was held at the Capital Library of China.

In December 2024, the Ministry of Culture and Tourism announced the "Top Ten Cases" and "Outstanding Cases" of the 2024 Cultural and Tourism Digital Innovation Demonstration. The "Intelligent Recommendation Application Based on Privacy Computing" by the Capital Library of China was honored as an "Outstanding Case" in the 2024 Cultural and Tourism Digital Innovation Demonstration.

In January 2025, the Capital Library of China was selected for the second batch of National Ancient Book Restoration Centers.

The online photo exhibition "Memories of Two Cities", jointly launched by the Capital Library of China and the National Library of Singapore, features a selection of historical photographs from both libraries' collections. It showcases the early cultural and social landscapes of Beijing and Singapore, tracing landmarks, scenes, and traditions that have changed over time.

== Collections ==
=== Library resources ===
According to the information on the library's official website in 2025, the Capital Library of China has a collection of 9.26 million books and documents. The collection includes ancient and rare books, Beijing local literature, contemporary books and newspapers, audio-visual materials and foreign books and periodicals.

The library's special collections include rare manuscripts and ancient texts, some dating back several centuries. According to 1980 statistics, since 1949, the collection of books and resources has increased 17-fold from the previous 110,000 volumes.

=== National rare books ===
According to the information on the library's official website in 2025, the Capital Library of China has about 500,000 volumes of ancient books, of which more than 6,000 are rare. "Che Wangfu Music Book" contains more than 1600 operas, folk art songs and other works, is a precious material for the study of Chinese folk art, people's feelings and folk customs.

The Capital Library of China digitizes some ancient books with detailed bibliography, and establishes the Image Database for Rare Ancient Book in Stock which is open to the public free of charge, and the ancient books collected in the database are selected into the List of Precious Ancient Books in China.

== Literature Development ==
In 2006, the Capital Library of China published A Collection of Calligraphic Treasures from the Capital Library of China. The book features a selection of various calligraphic works, including couplets, central scrolls, hanging panels, and fan surfaces. It encompasses a wide range of script styles, such as Oracle Bone Script, Bronze Inscriptions, Seal Script, Clerical Script, Cursive Script, Regular Script, and Running Script, along with their variations. The collection aims to comprehensively present the development of calligraphy from the Qing Dynasty to the Republic of China period.

In 2012, the Capital Library of China published A Century of Heritage, A Decade of Glory: Commemorative Collection for the 10th Anniversary of the Capital Library of China's New Building. The book includes reflections from library staff on the library's development over the past decade, as well as related academic papers. It is divided into seven sections: Ten-Year Review, Reader Services, Reading Activities, Work Research, Document Compilation, Network Technology, and Librarians' Reflections.

In 2023, the Capital Library of China published A Chronicle of 110 Years of the Capital Library of China: 1913-2023. The book is organized chronologically, documenting the library's development over more than a century from 1913 to 2023. Key events are systematically arranged by year to provide a structured historical overview.

== Academic Exchange ==
The Capital Library of China leverages Beijing's strategic location to collaborate with foreign embassies in China, as well as domestic and international library and cultural institutions. It has established connections with hundreds of institutions across more than 40 countries, hosting regional cultural exchanges and exhibitions to showcase global cultural resource.

== See also ==
- National first-class library
- List of libraries in China
