= Hubei Provincial Library =

Library in Wuhan, China

- 湖北省图书馆新馆
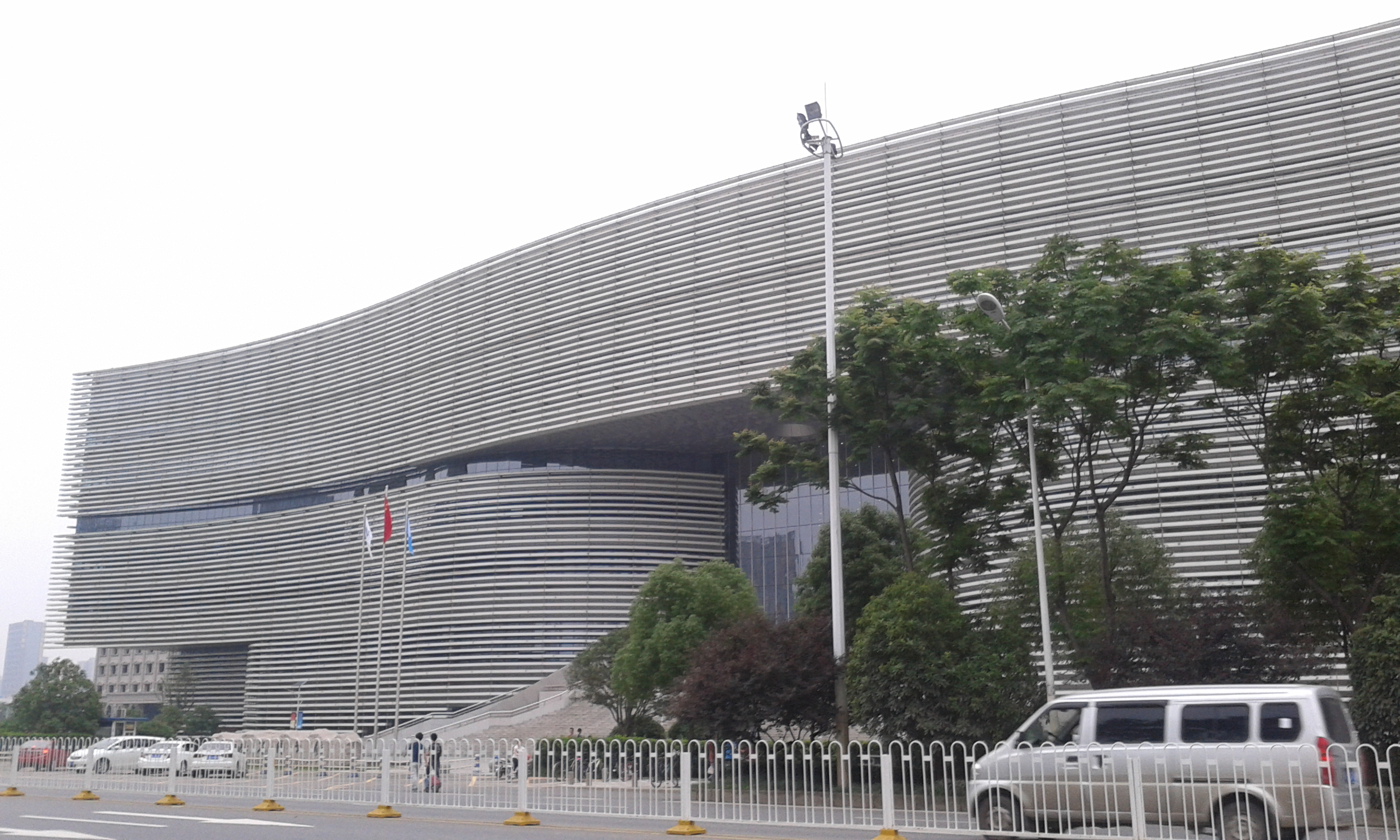
- Hubei Provincial Hall (New Hall)
- 30.5562180436488°N 114.33040337230373°E
- Location: Wuhan, China
- Established: 1904

Hubei Provincial Library (Chinese: 湖北省图书馆; pinyin: hú běi shěng tú shū guǎn) is located at south of Sha Lake, Wuhan. It was established in 1904 as Bureau of Books (图书局) at Wudang Palace (武当宫), Wuchang, by Zhang Zhidong, the viceroy of Huguang. The New library has a construction area of about 100,000 square meters, the reading rooms can hold 6300 people at the same time. The library has a collection of more than 5,500,000 volumes as of 2017.

== See also ==
- National first-class library
- List of libraries in China
