= Tianjin Library =

Public library in Tianjin, China

- Type: Public library
- Established: 1908

Other information
- Website: www.tjl.tj.cn

The Tianjin Library (simplified Chinese: 天津图书馆; traditional Chinese: 天津圖書館) is a provincial-level public library located in the Hexi District of Tianjin City. Established in 1908, it is one of the first provincial public libraries in China.

Tianjin Library is one of the largest public libraries and a national first-level library in China.

== History ==
The predecessors of Tianjin Library were Zhili Library (founded in the 34th year of Guangxu of the Qing Dynasty), Tianjin Municipal Library and the Former Tianjin Library, among which Zhili Library was the main one. The library was renamed several times, and in 1982, it was renamed to its current name.

== See also ==
- List of libraries in China
