= Ürümqi City Library =

Coordinates: 43°49′14″N 87°36′36″E

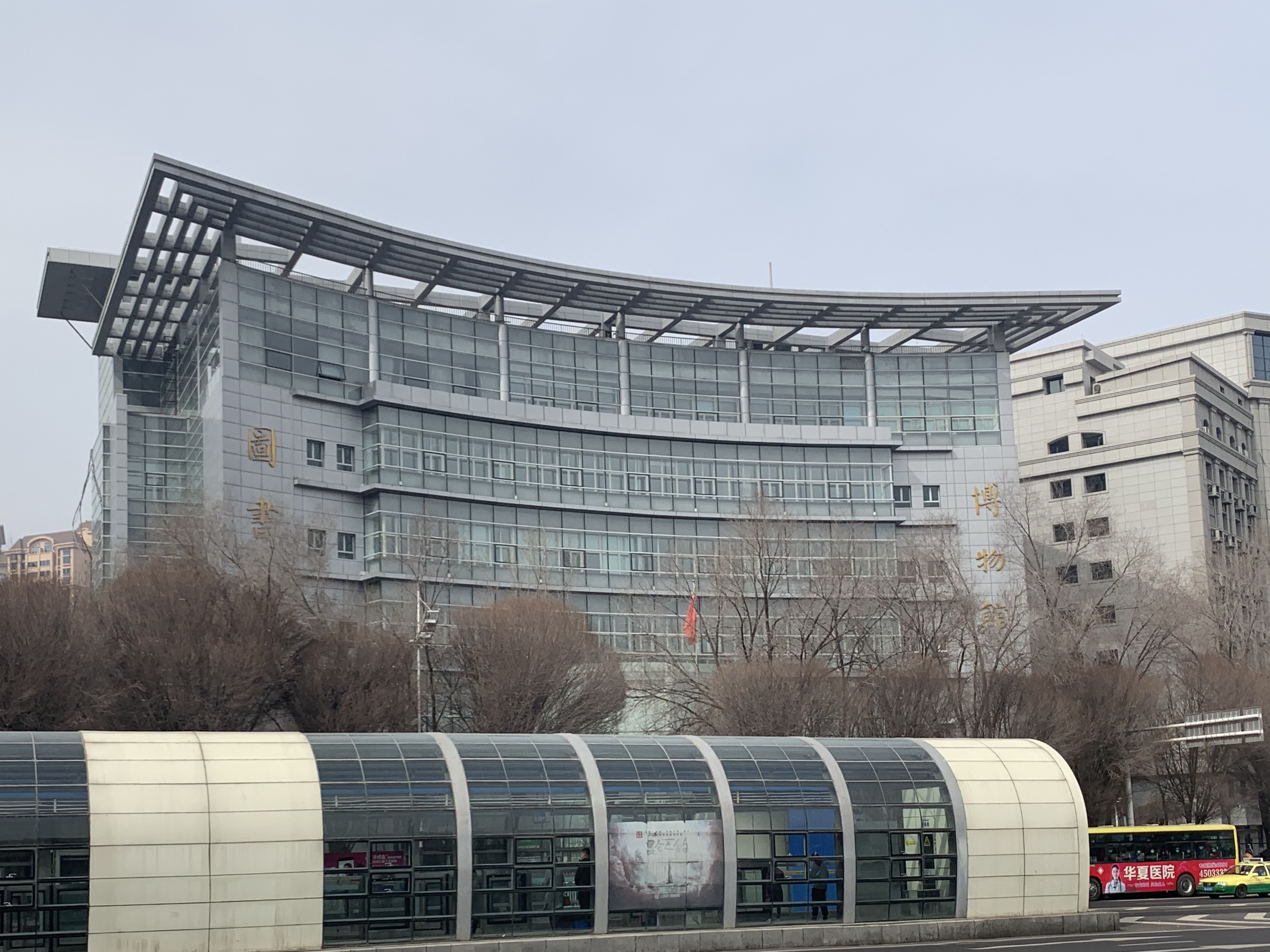
Ürümqi City Library on the left side of the building

The Ürümqi City Library (ئۈرۈمچى شەھەرلىك كۇتۇپخانا, Chinese: 乌鲁木齐市图书馆) is a public library in Shuimogou, Ürümqi in China's Xinjiang Uygur Autonomous Region. The library was founded in 1979. By 2000, it had 240,000 books.
