= Anhui Provincial Library =

Public library in Hefei City, China

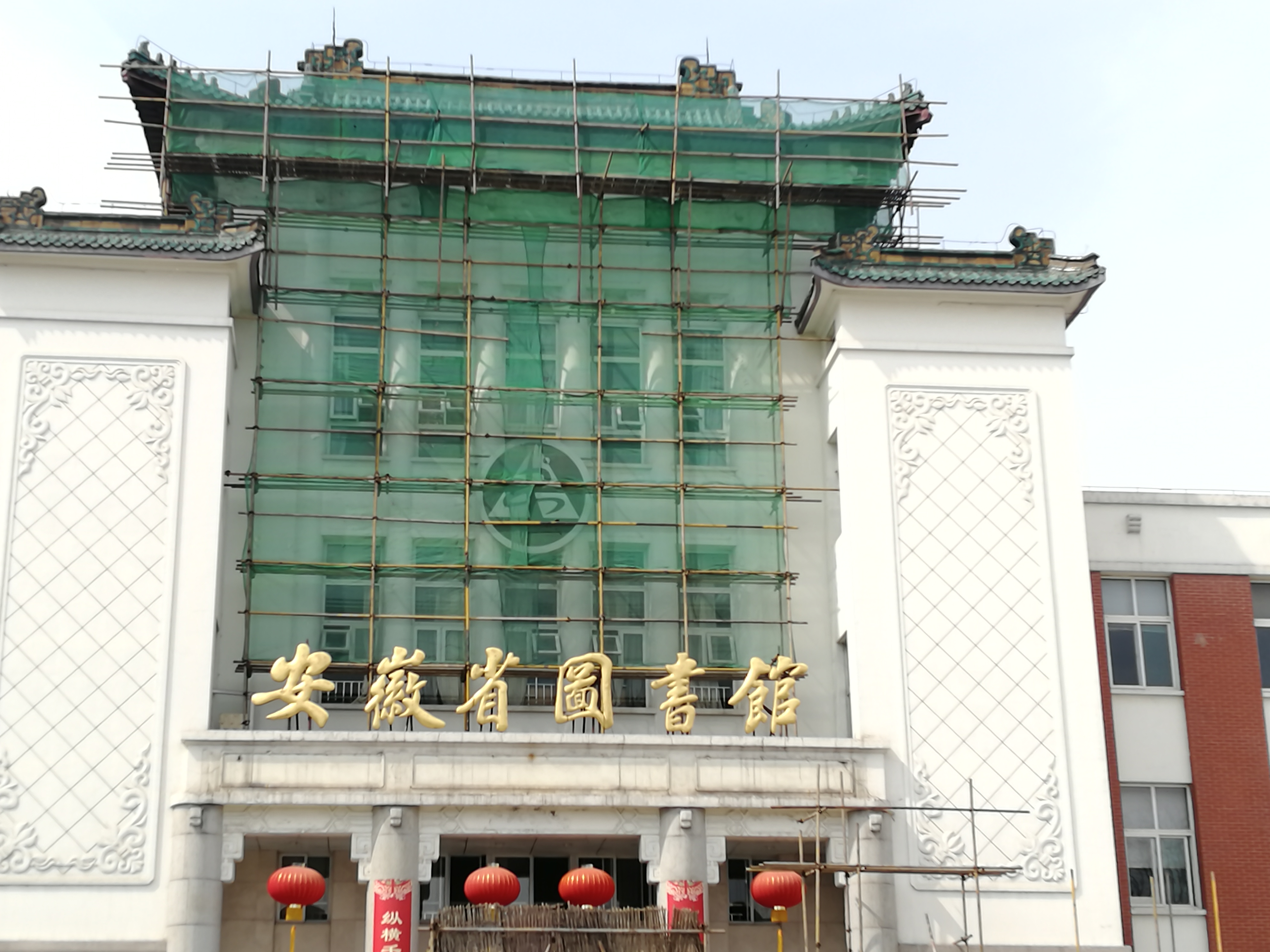
- The main hall of Anhui Provincial Library
- 31°51′24″N 117°17′03″E
- Location: No. 74, Wuhu Road, Baohe District, Hefei City, China
- Type: Public library
- Established: February 10, 1913

Other information
- Website: www.ahlib.com

The Anhui Provincial Library (simplified Chinese: 安徽省图书馆; traditional Chinese: 安徽省圖書館), also known as the Anhui Library, is a Hefei-based comprehensive provincial-level public library located at No. 74, Wuhu Road, Baohe District, Hefei City in China.

== History ==
The predecessor of the Anhui Provincial Library was the Anhui Province-established Library, which was founded on February 10, 1913. It was set up by a group of culture lovers on their own initiative.

The library was moved several times due to wars, and in December 1962, it was moved to its present location.

== See also ==
- National first-class library
- List of libraries in China
