= Gansu Provincial Library =

Public library in Lanzhou, China

- Location: 488 East Nanbinhe Road, Lanzhou City, Gansu Province
- Type: Public library
- Established: 1916

Other information
- Website: www.gslib.com.cn

The Gansu Provincial Library (simplified Chinese: 甘肃省图书馆; traditional Chinese: 甘肅省圖書館), also known as the Gansu Library, is a Lanzhou-based comprehensive and research-oriented public library, located at No. 488, Nanbinhe East Road, Chengguan District, Lanzhou City.

In 2008, Gansu Provincial Library was included in the first batch of the list of National Key Protection Unit for Ancient Books in China.

== History ==
Gansu Provincial Library was established in 1916, initially named the Gansu Public Library, and was later renamed several times, receiving its current name in 1953.

In 1966, the Complete Library of the Four Treasuries collected by the Wenyuange was moved from Shenyang to Lanzhou and kept in the special bookshelf of Gansu Provincial Library. In 2005, the Book Collection Hall of Wenyuange Complete Library of the Four Treasuries was inaugurated, and the collection was moved to the new hall.

== See also ==
- National first-class library
- List of libraries in China
