= Ningxia Library =

Library in Yinchuan, Ningxia, China

- Location: Yinchuan
- Type: Public library
- Established: 1958

The Ningxia Library (simplified Chinese: 宁夏图书馆; traditional Chinese: 寧夏圖書館), also known as the Library of Ningxia Hui Autonomous Region, is a large scale comprehensive research-oriented public library, located in Jinfeng District, Yinchuan City. The library was founded in 1958.

== History ==
In August 2008, the New Hall of Ningxia Library was opened with an investment of 260 million yuan and a building area of more than 33,000 square meters.

== See also ==
- List of libraries in China
