= Nanjing Library =

Public library in Nanjing, Jiangsu, China

Nanjing Library 南京图书馆
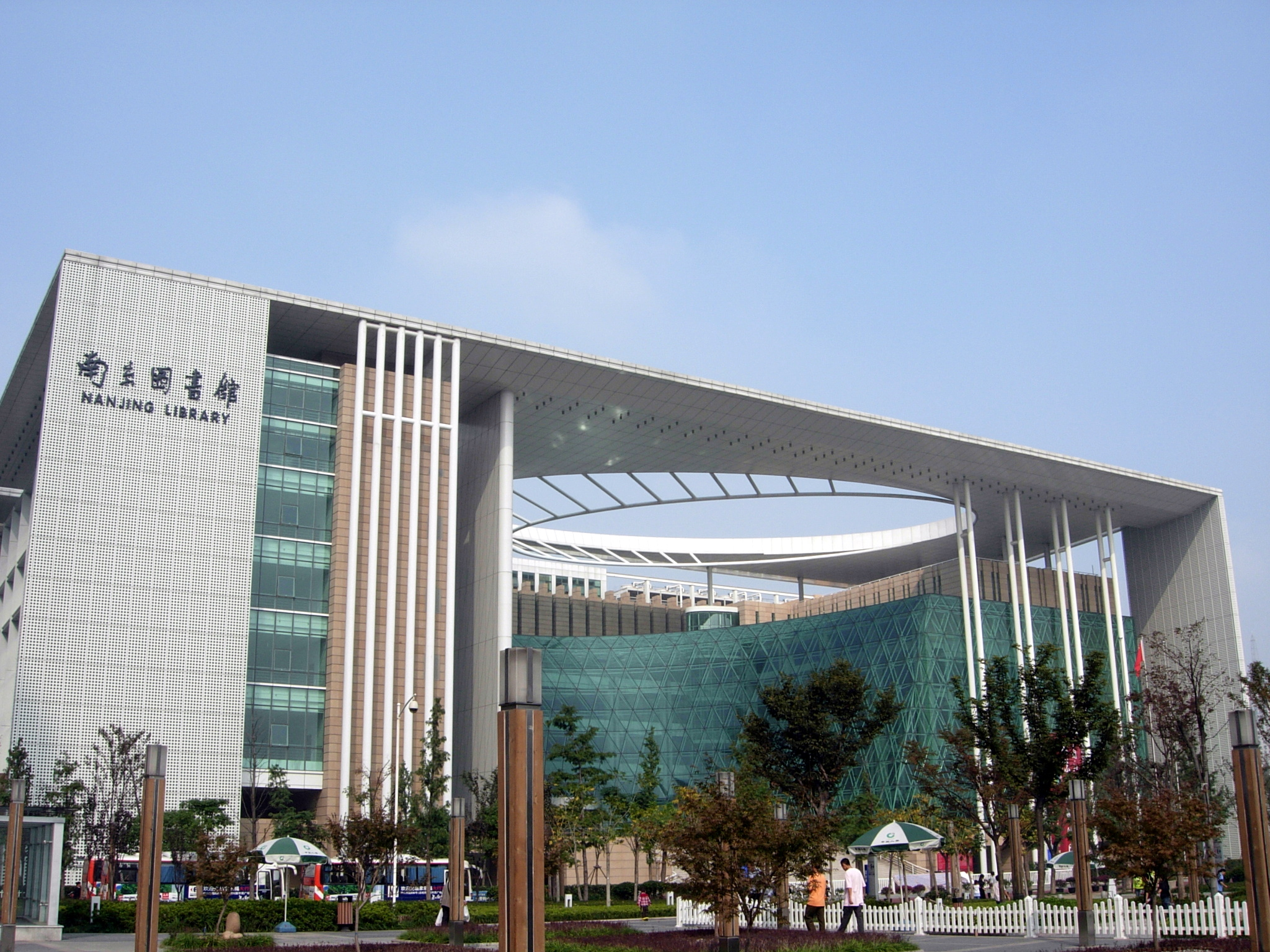
- 32.0439°N 118.79°E
- Location: 189 Zhongshan E Rd, Xuanwu, Nanjing, Jiangsu, China
- Type: Public
- Established: 1907; 119 years ago
- Branch of: Jiangsu Provincial Department of Culture and Tourism

Collection
- Items collected: 12 million (2016)

Other information
- Public transit access: Daxinggong 2 3
- Website: www.jslib.org.cn

Nanjing Library (simplified Chinese: 南京图书馆; traditional Chinese: 南京圖書館; pinyin: Nánjīng Túshūguǎn) is the third-largest library in China with over 10 million items. It houses important scientific, cultural and arts literature relating to Jiangsu province and other national historical records such as ancient Chinese and foreign publications. As located in the ancient capital Nanjing, the library contains 1.6 million ancient books and 100,000 volumes of books, documents and manuscripts (including Buddhist scriptures) dating from the Tang dynasty to the Ming dynasty.

== History ==
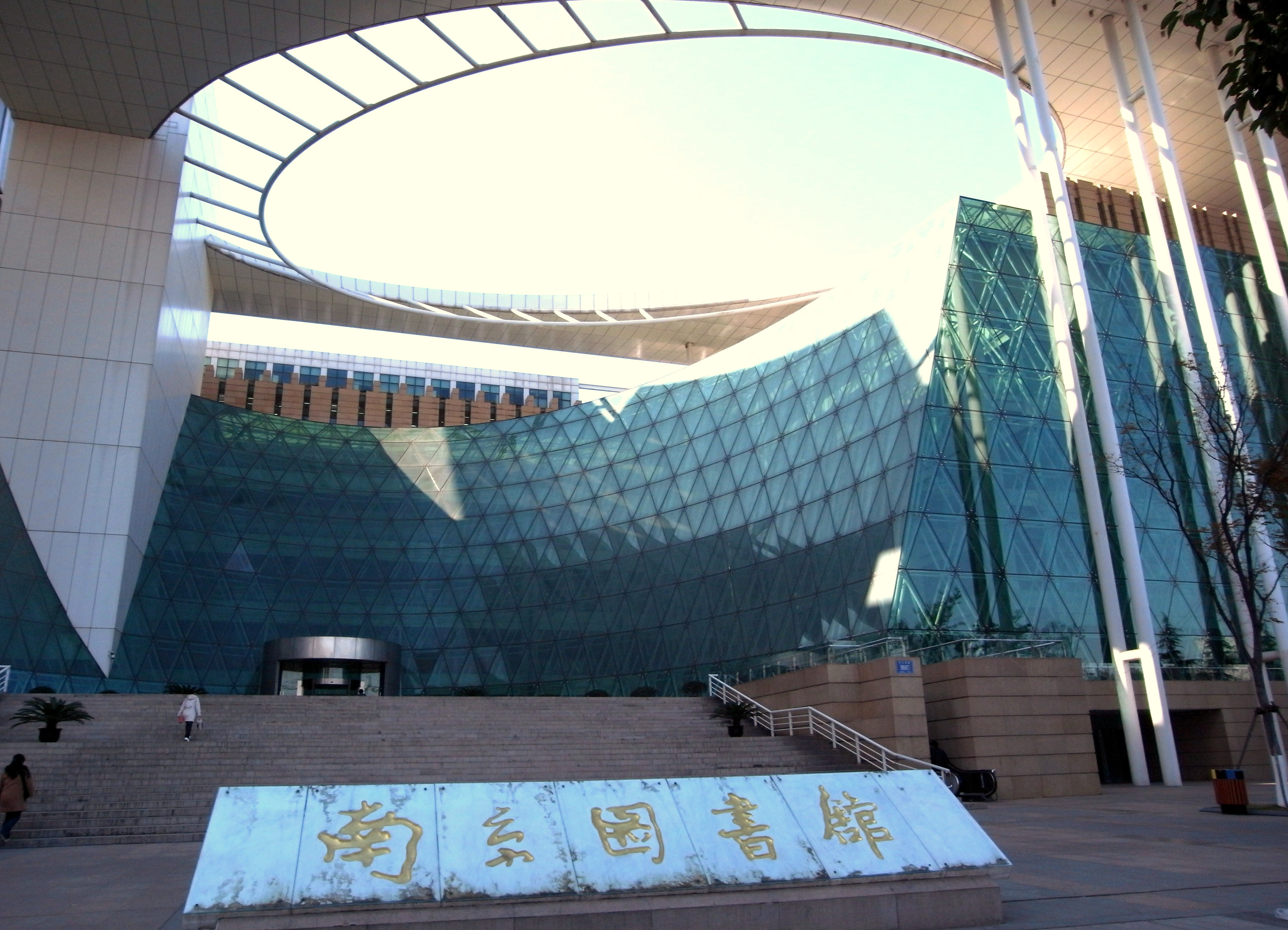

Nanjing Library was established in 1907 as Jiangnan Library. Over time, the library has undergone several organisational changes. The library endured through Qing dynasty, Republic of China, and the People's Republic of China. It witnessed greatest changes that took place in modern China and by itself gives clear records to the one-century history of modern China. Resources of books: Most of books were collected in 1949 (The year of establishment of People's Republic of China), including both printed and written document literature. Currently, the number of collection books in Nanjing Library is 2.3 million. One feature of Nanjing Library is ancient documents which is 1.6 million.

=== Jiangnan Library ===
In 1907 Duanfang, Viceroy of Liangjiang, established Jiangnan Library on the site of Xiyin Academy at Nanjing in order to preserve ancient books and scrolls of Song dynasty, Yuan dynasty, Ming dynasty, and Qing dynasty. Miao Quansun (繆荃孫) was appointed to be the librarian. The Jiangnan Library was the first modern public library in China.

=== China Studies Library ===
Jiangnan Library was renamed China Studies Library (or Library of Chinese Studies, 國學圖書館) during the Nationalist Government.

In 1927, the University District System was adopted in Jiangsu Province, and according to the system, Jiangnan Library was to be administered by the national university with the additional function of administering educational affairs in Jiangsu, in that year, and then in the May 1928 it was renamed as Library of Chinese Studies, National Central University, the name of which university was successively changed from National Southeastern University to Nanjing Zhongshan University in 1927, Jiangsu University and then Central University in 1928 and finally Nanjing University in 1949. Liu Yizheng (柳詒徵) was appointed to be the chief librarian. In October 1929, the University District System was abolished, and the library was administered by the Jiangsu Department of Education and was renamed as Jiangsu Provincial Library of Chinese Studies.

=== National Central Library ===
In 1933, the Chinese Ministry of Education built the National Central Library (國立中央圖書館) on Chengxian Street in Nanjing. The library was relocated several times due to the Sino-Japanese War and the Chinese Civil War. Jiang Fucong (蔣復璁) was the chief librarian. Towards the end of 1948, Jiang Fucong took about 130,000 volumes of rare books to Taiwan under instructions of the Republic of China. The core of this collection was formed by the "Rare Book Preservation Society" (文獻保存同志會) in 1940–41. In May 1949, the library was handed over to the Nanjing Military Control Commission. During the civil war National Central Library moved to Taipei and the remained in Nanjing was later renamed Nanjing Library.

=== Nanjing Library ===
On March 19, 1950, National Central Library was renamed as National Nanjing Library by the Ministry of Culture, and was put under the joint administration of the Bureau of Cultural Relics and Ministry of Culture. He Changqun was appointed as chief librarian. In October 1952, National Nanjing Library merged with Jiangsu Provincial Library of Chinese Studies. In July 1954 the library renamed Nanjing Library and was supervised by the Jiangsu Provincial Department of Culture. Wang Changbing was appointed as chief librarian.

== Departmental structure ==
The Nanjing Library is organized in the following structure.

- Office of the Chinese Communist Party Committee of NL
- Chief Librarian's Office
- Hu Resources Department
- Labor Union
- Office of General Affairs
- Security Office
- Department of Acquisition and Cataloging
- Reader Service Department
- Department of Information Resources Development
- Department of Information Technology Application
- Historical Archive Department
- Research and Training Department
- Editing House of 21st Century Library

== Reciprocal library exchange program ==
Nanjing Library has partnered with the State Library of Victoria (Australia) for reciprocal exchange since 1985. This includes staff visits and exchange of publications between the libraries.

== Location ==
The Nanjing Library is located at Main Library 66 Chengxian Road, Nanjing, Jiangsu Province 210018, People's Republic of China

== Transportation ==
The library is accessible from 2 3 Daxinggong of Nanjing Metro.

== See also ==
- National first-class library
- National Central Library
- Jinling Library
- Shanghai Library
- Libraries in the People's Republic of China
  - National Library of China
- Chinese Library Classification (CLC)
- Archives in the People's Republic of China
- Ningbo Library
