= Pudong Library =

Library in Pudong, Shanghai, China

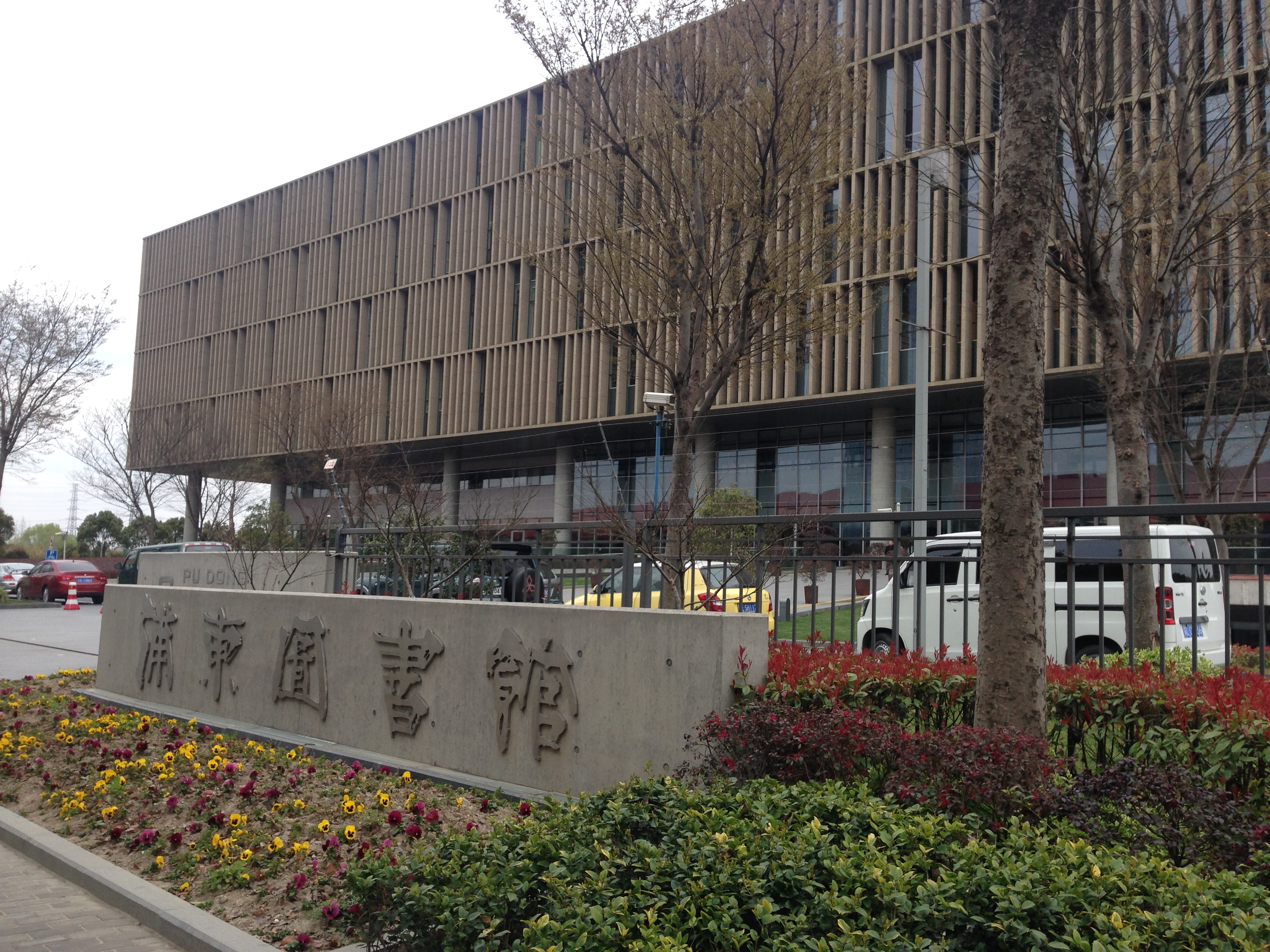
- 31.1922°N 121.5393°E
- Location: 88 Qiancheng Road, Pudong New Area, Shanghai 201204, China
- Established: 2010

Other information
- Website: www.pdlib.com

Pudong Library (Chinese: 浦东图书馆; pinyin: Pūdōng Túshūguǎn') is a library in Shanghai, China. It provides access to resources such as newspapers, electronic books and research papers. The library offers approximately 3,900,000 resources. Average daily attendance is 6,000; In 2017, the library achieved its highest attendance of 30,000 in a single day. The library closed for renovation in 2018, and reopened on 1 January 2019.

== Design ==
Pudong Library has a hexagonal design. The building rises through eight floors, two underground and the remaining six above. Its external appearance gives the impression that the building is floating. The building has been referred to as a bar-code.

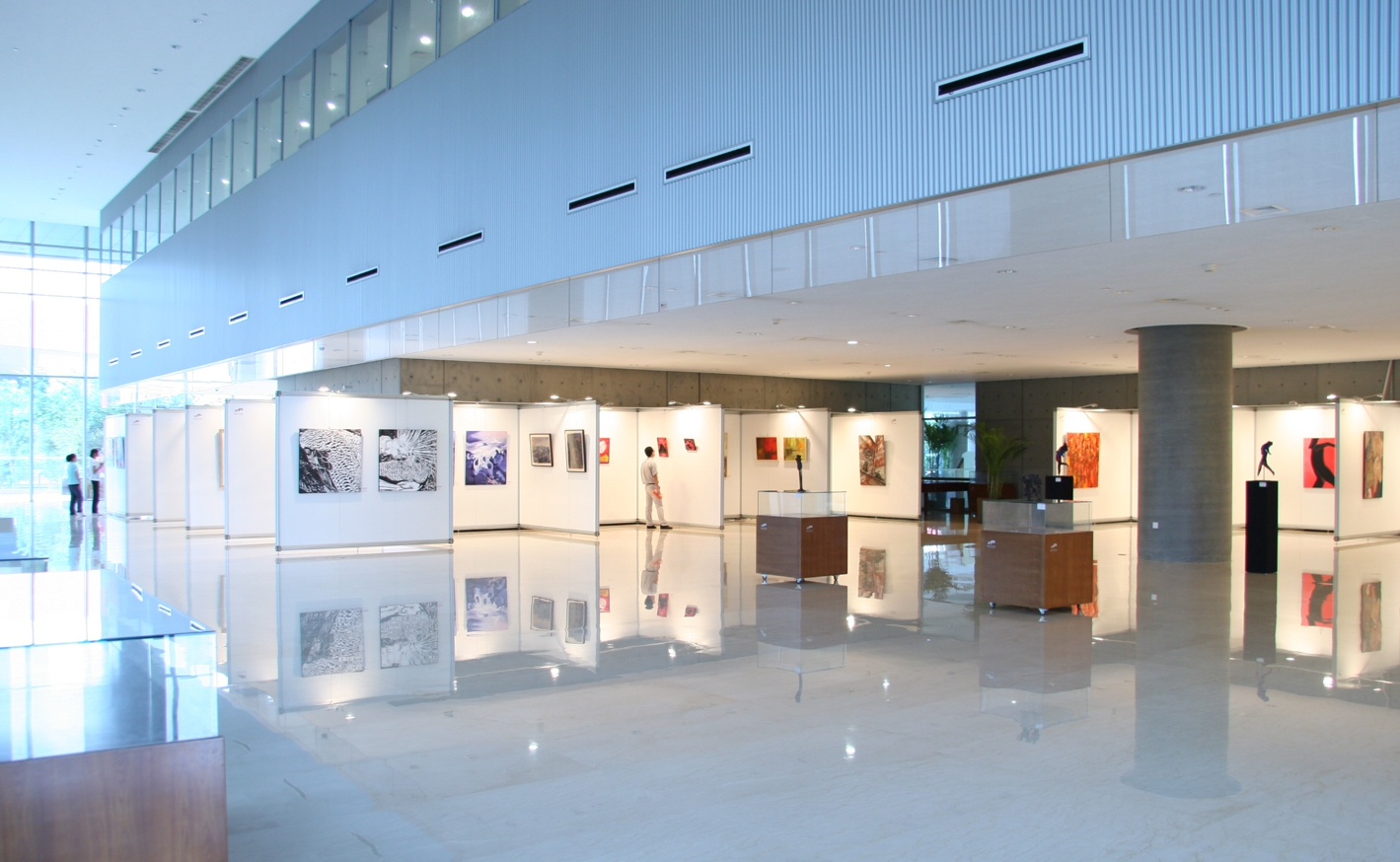
Internal appearance of Pudong Library

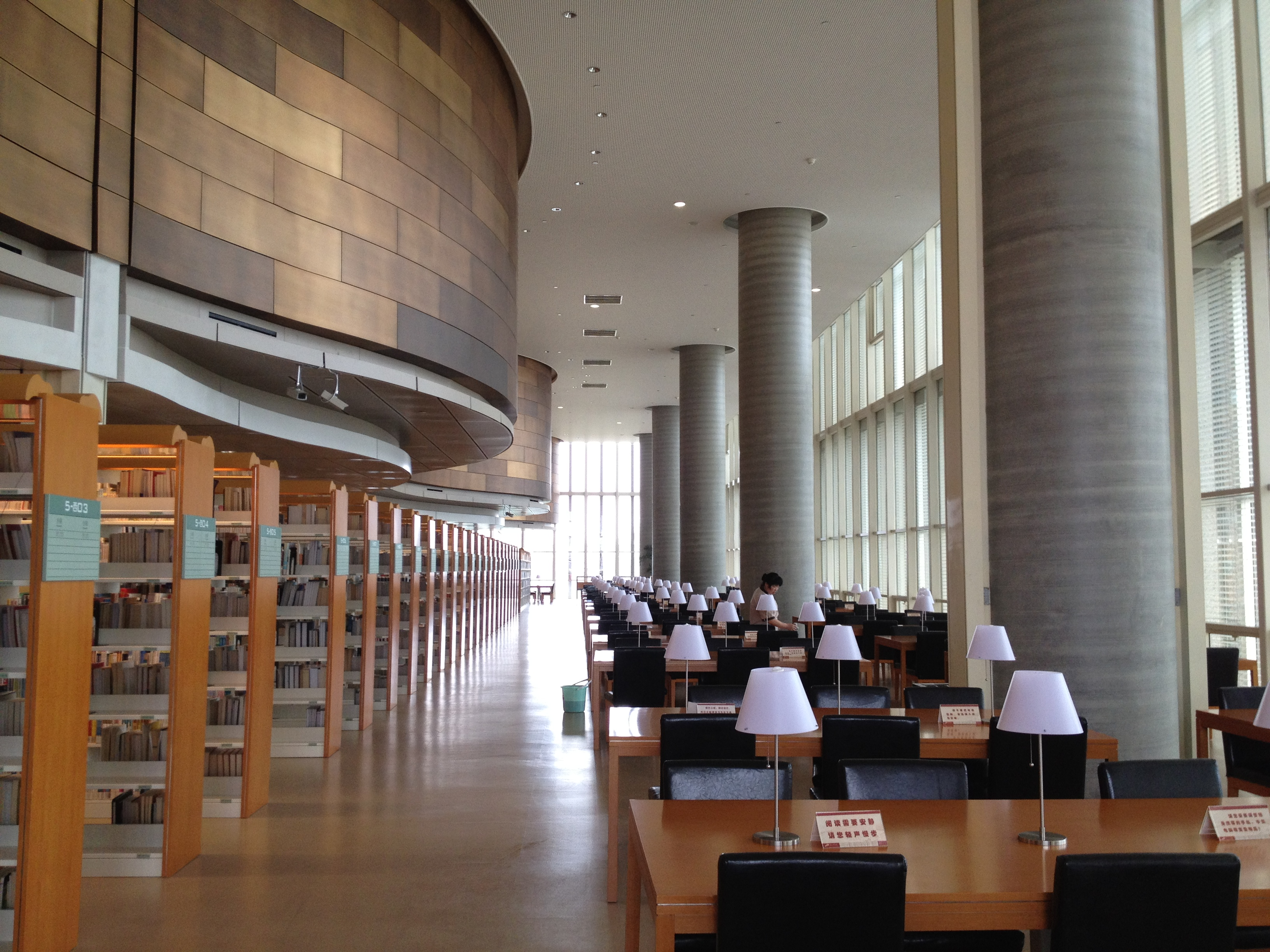
Features of Pudong Library

The atrium starts from the basement and goes to the top of the building.

=== Sky Gardens ===
The interior features two symmetrical sky gardens.

== Neighborhood ==
Pudong Library is near the China Executive Leadership Academy and is located in Shanghai's new civilization circle with Pudong Political and Civilized Park.

== Awards ==
- "Universal Reading Demonstration Base", Library Society of China, 2013

== See also ==
- National first-class library
- Libraries in China
  - National Library of China
  - Shanghai Library
  - Guangzhou Library
  - Ningbo Library
- Chinese Library Classification
