= Heilongjiang Provincial Library =

Public library in Heilongjiang, China

Heilongjiang Provincial Library 黑龙江省图书馆
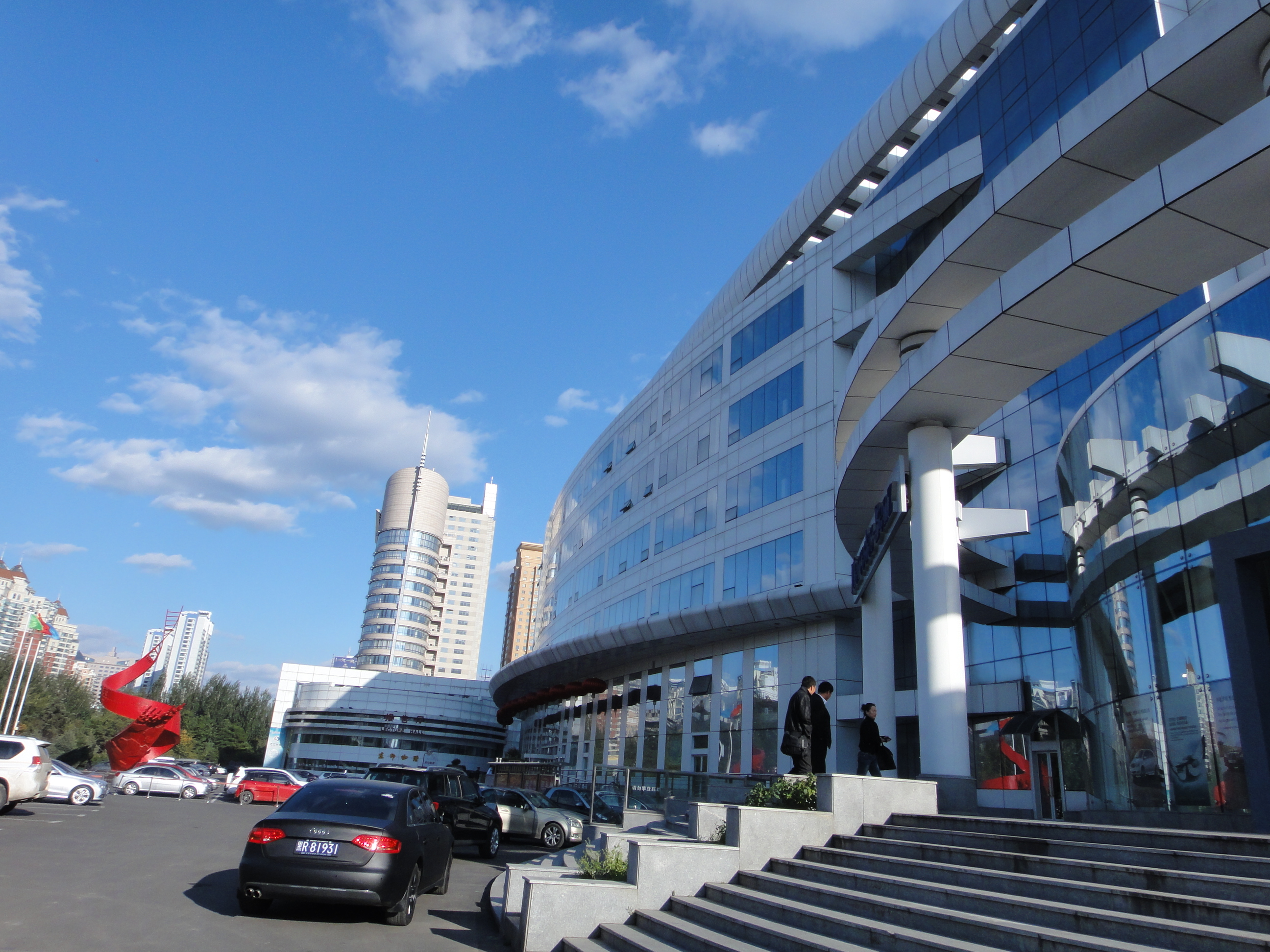
- Location: 216 Changjiang Rd, Nangang, Harbin, Heilongjiang, China
- Type: Public
- Established: 1906 (120 years ago)
- Branch of: Heilongjiang Provincial Department of Culture

Collection
- Items collected: 2.8 million (2008)

Access and use
- Population served: members of the public

Other information
- Website: www.hljlib.org.cn

Heilongjiang Provincial Library (Chinese: 黑龙江省图书馆; pinyin: Hēilóngjiāng Shěng Túshūguǎn) is the largest library in Heilongjiang Province, as well as a major provincial library in China. It houses important scientific, cultural and arts literature relating to Northeast China and other national historical records such as ancient Chinese and foreign publications.

== History ==
In 1907, the governor of Heilongjiang General established Heilongjiang Library in Qiqihar, the former capital of Heilongjiang. In 1954, after the merger of Heilongjiang and Songjiang provinces, Harbin was established the new capital of Heilongjiang Province. Therefore Heilongjiang Provincial government prepared for the construction of new Heilongjiang Provincial Library since 1957, and opened for public service in 1962. In 2003, the library moved to a newly built modern building located on the east of Dragon Tower in Nangang District of Harbin.

== See also ==
- National first-class library
- Libraries in the People's Republic of China
- Chinese Library Classification (CLC)
- Archives in the People's Republic of China
