= Yangshi Lei Archives =

Collection of drawings and models of Qing architecture

- National Library of China, The Palace Museum and various locations
- Type: Architectural drawings, models, text records
- Date: 1686–1911
- Material: ink-brush, charcoal, traditional Chinese paper, wood
- Size: >17,000

The Yangshi Lei Archives (Chinese: 样式雷; pinyin: Yàngshì Léi; lit. 'Lei style architecture') are the collection of design drawings and models of Qing imperial architecture. "Yangshi" means architect or architecture, "Lei" is the surname of the Lei architectural family.

Works in the archives include the Forbidden City, the Temple of Heaven, the Summer Palace, the Chengde Mountain Resort, the Eastern Qing tombs and so on. The manuscripts in this archive contain contents that span from interior decoration, site surveys, to construction methods. In terms of forms, they contain drawings of floor plans, sections, elevations, and model buildings made of wood. Over 12,000 out of around 17,000 individual pieces so far found, are now collected in the National Library of China. In 2007, UNESCO inscribed it to the Memory of the World Register-Asia and the Pacific.

== The Lei family ==
The Lei family of architects were in charge of Qing imperial architecture design for 200 years between the 17th to 19th centuries, specifically from the twenty-fifth year of Kangxi reign (1686) up to the begin of Republic of China (1912).

Originally from the Jiangxi Province, the Lei family engaged in carpentry and palace construction during the Ming dynasty. In the period of the Kangxi Era during the Qing dynasty, the court recruited carpenters nationwide to build the Hall of Supreme Harmony (Taihe Dian) in the Forbidden City. The first generation of Lei family builders, Lei Fada, (1619-1693) were recruited and moved to Beijing. Lei Fada's eldest son, Lei Jinyu, followed his father's career path and earned a position at the Ministry of Works, serving the Qing court on architecture design and construction. He invented the Doukou structure, where slot cut in the wooden brackets to fit the other interlocking parts, based on the existed Dougong structure(interlock wooden brackets). From then on, seven generations of the Lei family took charge of the imperial architecture construction in Pattern Design Office consecutively until the end of the Qing dynasty. The seven generations are listed below.

- Lei Fada (1619–1693) Participation: rebuild of the Hall of Supreme Harmony
- Lei Jinyu (1659–1729) Participation: Old Summer Palace, Changchun Yuan
- Lei Shengcheng (1729–1792)
- Lei Jiawei (1758–1845): Gardens in Royal Mountains and the Old Summer Palace, Chengde Mountain Resort; Lei Jiaxi (1764–1825): Hall of Jiuzhou Qingyan, (one of the 40 scenic spots in the Old Summer Palace), Tomb of Remarkable for the Jiaqing Emperor; Lei Jiarui (1770–1830)
- Lei Jingxiu (1803–1866)
- Lei Siqi (1826–1876) Participation: rebuild of the Old Summer Palace
- Lei Tingchang (1845–1907) Participation: Tomb of Kindness for the Tongzhi Emperor, Tomb east of Dingling for Empress Dowager Cixi, Tomb east of Dingling in the broad valley of good omens for Empress Dowager Ci'an

== Contents ==
The Yangshi Lei Archives contains schematic design, construction drawings, enlarged detail design, preview models for the emperors to visualize the finished buildings, and literal descriptions. Works in the archives are the Qing imperial buildings, part of which are listed on the World Cultural Heritage Cites in China.

=== The design process ===
The royal construction engineering system during the Qing dynasty is supervised by the Ministry of Works and conducted by a team that formed from craftsmen recruited nationwide. The Pattern Design Office and the Building Estimate Office were set under the Ministry of Works. The Pattern Design Office was in charge of construction design, while the Building Estimate Office estimated the cost of labour and materials.

In the design process, drawings, models and building method texts were based on the Official Manual of Constructional Engineering, a technical book that specified building methods published by the court. The first construction method guide book can trace back to the Treatise on Architectural Methods (Yingzao Fashi) published in 1103 during the Song dynasty. The drawings demonstrate the layout, elevation of buildings and decorating details. The models are the visualization of the buildings with size and methods marked on them. The text documents specified the construction method and record the daily process.

=== Drawings ===
The contents in the graphical samples cover the process of each stage of construction, including site survey, planning, construction method and working notes. In terms of representation, they contain drawings of floor plans, section and elevation. They were drawn and written in ink-brush, charcoal on traditional Chinese paper. Among all Yangshi Lei drawings, the largest sketch is approximately six meters in length, whereas the smallest piece is about six centimetres.

==== Recording method: legends ====
The drawings use particular legends and labels to represent the size, shape, structure, location, function and other relative information needed in construction. On the drawings for new projects, "tags" written on red or yellow paper are attached to indicate the date of the building's parts, such as "bay-dimensions", "building depth", "height of column", "diameter of the column" and so on. Information about colours and shapes are also found on the tags.

==== Recording method: grid system ====
During the site survey process, in order to record the three-dimensional topographic features, they used the grid system to projection three-dimensional data on two-dimension paper. A grid system is first drawn from the site centre towards four directions. The scale of the grid depends on the dimension of the layout. Then, at the intersection points of the grid, heights of the land were noted beside. Therefore, the height of the terrain as well as the plane area can be calculated. The grid system was used for site survey and construction planning stage. According to the study of Wang Qiheng, the grid system used for topography survey is "fully compatible with the concept of the Digital Elevation Model (DEM) nowadays."

Techniques of "layered images, direct parallelism, and perspective shadowing" are also used to represent the three-dimension structure of the buildings. These drawings for technical use are all held by the Lei family themselves outside the court.

=== Models ===
The Yangshi Lei Archives collection includes building models namely the "ironed models" (Chinese: 烫样; pinyin: tàng yàng). These ironed models were sent to get viewed and the official approval from the emperor, before conducting further construction method design and cost accounting.

The components of Yangshi Lei ironed models were made from cardboard, soft white spruce, red pine and sorghum stalk, and then ironed to fortify the model structure. It is named "ironed" due to this ironing process. They are made into a scale ranging from 1:200, 1:100, 1:50 to 1:20. The surface of the models was coloured according to the design manuscript. The information on building materials and dimension are labelled on the models. The models can generally be divided into three types: the global complex, the individual buildings, and the detailed pieces.

The individual buildings visualize the outer and inner structures, and the detailed pieces focus on partial particular furnishings decorations. In an individual building model, the parts of those models can be disassembled. The roof can be removed so that a closer look of inner structures and interior decorations can be seen. The individual building model "Dian Men" is an instance of single building model with hip-and-gable roof. Its roof part can be removed, and the timbers and column structures inside can be seen in detail. The paintings and patterns on eaves and interior decoration are also clear. Notations of dimensions and name of component parts are attached.

In addition to a single building, the global complexes visualize the layout of space, connection of buildings and the surrounding environment. Usually, the layout of the Ancient Chinese complex forms to a courtyard consisting of buildings and surroundings. There are mountains, height and flow direction of streams and rivers shown in most of the complex models.

== Origins and collection of the archives ==
The collection of Yangshi Lei architecture materials mainly comes from the archives viewed by the court and archives held by the Lei family themselves. It is a combination of models and sketches found remained in the palace, and materials in museums that were purchased from the last Yangshi Lei generation Lei Tingchang.

The archives that viewed by the court are collected in the Palace Museum Archives and the Document Section (the former institution of The Number One Archives). They are the only parts that are directly inherited from the imperial collection without dealings. Drawings in these archives are the final formal ones. During the seven generations of the Lei family's service in the Pattern Design office, sketches and models were first submitted to the court for review. According to command from the emperor, the documents were either reserved in the palace or the Construction Office for further references.

Besides, dozens of documents were also collected within the Lei family except those which need to submit to the court. They intended to store the manuscripts from the fifth generation. According to a study by Wang Qiheng and his team who focus on research of the Yangshi Lei Archives, it is shown that some documents had been revised by the Lei descendants for the reconstruction and renovation of imperial buildings. Therefore, most of the archives were held by descendants of Lei's.

Around 1930, the Leis began to sell the documents due to financial difficulties. Under the help from Zhu Qiqian, most parts of the collection were purchased by the National Library of China. The others were purchased by the Beijing public and people from abroad. Besides, the Beijing-based Society for Research in Chinese Architecture also devoted to purchase and collect the scattered manuscripts from the market and transferred them to the National Library. The models collected by the National of China were moved to the National Palace Museum for preservation after the third Chinese Civil War.

Outside of China, Araki Seizo bought around a thousand of documents from book fairs in China in 1931. Fifty-three of them are now collected in the Institute of Oriental Culture, University of Tokyo. They are mainly drawings of the mausoleums. The Asia collection of Cornell University Library and the Musée national des Arts asiatiques-Guimet also hold several pieces.

== Research ==
The collection and research on the Yangshi Lei Archives started in the 1930s. The research has mainly focused on the Lei family, catalogue, and utilization of them.

=== 1930–1940: Society for Research in Chinese Architecture ===
The earliest research on the Yangshi Lei Archives was led by Zhu Qiqian, who was the founder of the Society for Research in Chinese Architecture. He helped with the first purchase and collection of the National Library of China. On 21 March 1931, Zhu held an exhibition called "Historical Documents and Artifacts of the Old Summer Palace (Yuanming Yuan)". A large part of the exhibits was from the Yangshi Lei Archives. Zhu saw this archive as one of the keystones in research of the ancient Chinese architecture design, as well as the Song Treatise on Architectural Methods (Yingzao Fashi) and Qing Official Manual of Constructional Engineering, due to its large scale and coverage on each step of building design. Research in the stage first catalogued the drawings and models.

=== 1980–1990: Utilization of the archives ===
This stage focuses on the utilization of the Yangshi Lei Archives on renovations of the Summer Palace, the Old Summer Palace, and so on. More categorizations are completed.

=== 1990 – present ===
Two main institutions concerned with Yangshi Lei Archives research are the School of Architecture at Tianjin University and Tsinghua University. They centre on the Yangshi Lei Archives with relative architectural theory, and digital reconstructions of the Old Summer Palace respectively.

== Sources ==
- "Yangshi Lei Archives, 1. Vertical Plan of the Circular Gate at Lüxin Shuwu Library". Word Digital Library.
- "Yangshi Lei Archives, 2. Plan of Jiuzhou Qingyan at Yuanmingyuan". World Digital Library.

== See also ==
- Lei Family Bridge
