= Miao Quansun =

Chinese philologist and librarian, founder of libraries

- Traditional Chinese: 繆荃孫
- Simplified Chinese: 缪荃孙
Transcriptions
Standard Mandarin
- Hanyu Pinyin: Miào Quánsūn
- Wade–Giles: Miao Ch'üan-sun

Miao Quansun (缪荃孙; 繆荃孫; Miào Quánsūn) (20 September 1844 – 22 December 1919), courtesy name Yanzhi (Chinese: 炎之; pinyin: Yánzhī), was a Chinese philologist, historian, educationalist, bibliographer and librarian. He oversaw the foundation of the Jiangnan Library in Nanjing and was the first administrator of the National Library of China in Beijing.

== Other names ==
Miao Quansun was also known by other names. Other than his courtesy name Yanzhi (炎之; Yánzhī), he was also known as Xiaoshan (筱珊; Xiǎoshān, also written as 小山 or 筱山). In older Romanisations, his name may also be rendered Miao Ch'üan-sun.

== Early life ==
Miao Quansun was a native of Miaojia, a village in Shengang Town, Jiangyin, Jiangsu province. He was born on 20 September 1844 (the 24th year of the Daoguang Emperor) into a family of officials. His grandfather, Miao Tinghuai (缪庭槐; 繆庭槐; Miào Tínghuái), served as the prefectural magistrate of Pingliang in Gansu, and his father, Miao Huanzhang (缪煥章; 缪焕章; Miào Huànzhāng), passed the provincial imperial examination, but did not get an official position. Later, he served in the military command under Zhang Guoliang, but was dismissed in 1863 after anti-missionary riots in Qingyan and Kaizhou in 1861 and 1862.

His education progressed rapidly, completing his study of the Five Classics by the age of 11. When he was 17, the Taiping Army entered Jiangyin and he fled with his stepmother to Huai'an. At 21, he moved to Chengdu, where his studies continued. He passed the Sichuan provincial imperial exam at the age of 24. In 1876, the second year of the Guangxu Emperor's reign, at the age of 33, he passed the highest palace examination, gained the title of shujishi and entered the Hanlin Academy. He remained there for 7 years and assisted Zhang Zhidong, then an editor there, in compiling the Shun Tianfu Chronicles (顺天府志), a 130-volume gazetteer of the Beijing metropolitan area. This work was completed in 1885 and revised in 1889. He later resigned after disagreement with the head of the academy, Xu Tong. He spent the following ten years collating and editing written works.

== Academic life ==
In 1888, he was appointed as director of the Nanjing Academy (南菁书院), which, established in 1884 by Huang Tifang, was famous for its printing house. In 1891, he took charge of Luoyang Academy, in 1894 Zhongshan Adcademy in Nanjing and also the Longcheng Academy in Changzhou. In 1901, he served as the editor-in-chief of the Jiangchu Compilation and Translation Bureau. In 1902, Zhongshan Academy became the Jiangnan Advanced School, where he was the school principal. Following the implementation of the Guimao system for schools, the Jiangnan School was closed and the Office of the Governor of Liangjiang planned to "first set up a large normal school as a platform for educational affairs".

In May 1902, he became chief inspector of schools and was responsible for the preparation of the Sanjiang Normal School. He also traveled to Dongyang with seven other chairs, including Xu Naichang and Lui Yizheng to inspect academic affairs there.

In 1906, he learned that the great bibliophile and book collector Ding Bing had died. His "Mansion of Eight Thousand Volumes" was to be sold to the Seikadō Bunko Library. Miao bought the books instead for over 70,000 yuan and had them transferred to Nanjing. In 1907, he was appointed to set up the Jiangnan Library, now the Nanjing Library. Also in that city, he oversaw the construction of the Taofeng Building, which opened in 1910 in the Xuanwu District on the site of the former Xiyin Academy. In 1909, he was engaged to set up the Beijing Jingshi Library, now the National Library of China, under the supervision of Ren Zheng. In 1914, he was appointed editor-in-chief of the Draft History of Qing.

Over his lifetime, Miao collected 100,000 volumes in his so-called "Yifengtang" collection.

Miao died at home suddenly in Shanghai on 22 December 1919. His book collection was mostly sold within a year. His son, Miao Lubao (缪禄保; 繆祿保; Miào Lùbǎo), sent his father's collection of gold and stones to Beijing, where most of them were incorporated into the collections of the Peking University Library. In total, Miao had lived in 16 provinces.

== Bibliography ==
Miao authored over 200 volumes and edited many more.

=== Yifengtang Collection bibliography and catalogues ===
- Articles in the Yifengtang Collection (艺风堂文集)
- Secretary of the Yifengtang Collection (艺风堂藏书记)
- Records of Studies of the Yifengtang Collection (艺风堂读书记)
- Continued Records of the Yifengtang Collection (艺风堂续记)
- Stele Inscriptions in the Yifengtang Collection (艺风堂金石目)

=== As editor ===
- Answers to Questions of Bibliography (书目答问), compiled on behalf of Zhang Zhidong and later supplemented by Fan Xizeng's Supplementary Answers to Questions of Bibliography (书目答问补正)
- Further Summaries of the Siku Quanshu (续修四库全书提要)
- Catalogue of the Library of the Qing Education Ministry (清学部图书馆善本书目)
- Catalogue of the Local Records in the Library of the Qing Education Ministry (清学部图书馆方志目)
- Continued Collected Stele Biographies (续国朝碑传集), a continuation of Collected Stele Biographies by Qian Yiji
- Lyrical Records of Changzhou (常州词录)
- Chronology of Statesmen of the Northern and Southern Dynasties (南北朝名臣年表)
- Outlines of Recent Literature (近代文学大纲)

=== Local chronicles ===
- Shun Tianfu Chronicles (顺天府志) (1885, rev. 1889), compiled on behalf of Zhang Zhidong: a gazetteer of the Beijing metropolitan area
- Records of Hubei (湖北通志)
- Records of Jiangsu (江苏通志)
- Records of Jiangyin County (江阴县续志)

=== As compiler and publisher ===
- Books of Unrestrained Clouds (云自在龛丛书, 1883)
- Arranged Fragments of Fragrant Lotus Roots (藕香零拾)
- Essay of the Eastern Hall of Misty Images (烟画东堂小品)
- Books of the Rain-Facing Pavilion (对雨楼丛书)
