= Jinling Library =

1927 Nanjing Municipal Library

- 金陵图书馆
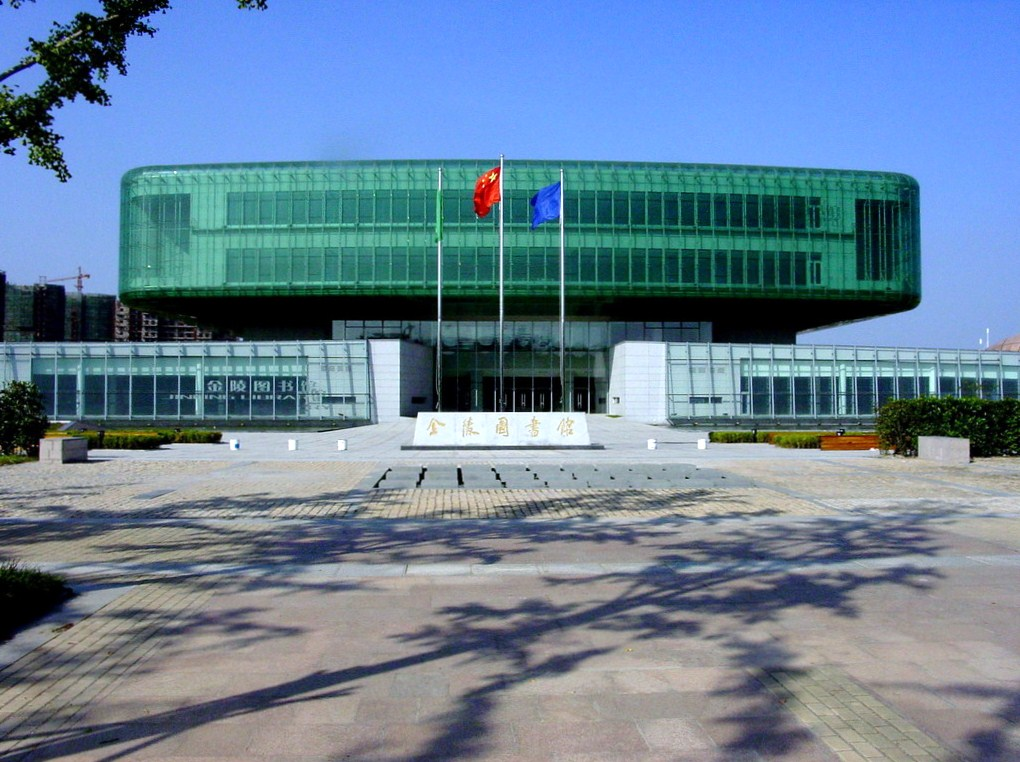
- Jinling Library
- 32.01287434337707°N 118.7183521011663°E
- Location: Nanjing, Jiangsu, China
- Established: 1927

Other information
- Website: http://www.jllib.org.cn/

Jinling Library (simplified Chinese: 金陵图书馆; traditional Chinese: 金陵圖書館; pinyin: Jīnlíng Túshūguǎn) is a Nanjing Municipal Library, founded in 1927, located at the former Pingjiangfu Chapel. Originally, it was called Nanjing Special (No.1) Popular Library. In 1928, it changed its name into Nanjing No.1 Municipal Library, and in 1930 to Nanjing Special Municipal Demotic Library. It was then moved to the Pan Palace. Jinling Library merged with the Domestic Science Museum in 1932 and was renamed as Nanjing Municipal Library the following year. On December 13, 1937, after the Japanese troops took over Nanjing, the Pan Palace, together with the library, was badly damaged and most of the books were destroyed. In 1952, Nanjing was demoted from the national capital to the capital of Jiangsu Province. Six years later, the Municipal Government decided to reestablish the library. In October 1980, the library was completed and open to the public at 262 Changjiang Road. The new pavilion had been constructed since 2005 and was open for trial in 2009. Jinling Library, with a total of two million books, is now located at 158 Leshan Road, Jianye District.

== Transportation ==
The library is accessible within walking distance north west of Olympic Stadium East Station of Nanjing Metro.

== See also ==
- National first-class library
- Nanjing Library
- Ningbo Library
- List of libraries in China
