= Collected Stele Biographies =

Beizhuan Ji

Collected Stele Biographies (Chinese: 碑传集; pinyin: Bēizhuàn Jí) is a biographical book of the Qing dynasty, by Qian Yiji. It is compiled from the contents of steles covering almost 200 years, from the early Qing dynasty to the Jiaqing era. It details over 2000 people in 25 categories and comprises 160 volumes. It was started in the early years of the Daoguang Emperor and published in 1893 (the nineteenth year of the reign of the Guangxu Emperor).

In the early years of Guangxu, the 86-volume Continued Collected Stele Biographies (Chinese: 续碑传集; pinyin: Xù Bēizhuàn Jí) was compiled by Miao Quansun, with 1111 additional figures collected from the reigns of the Daoguang Emperor to that of the Guangxu Emperor. It was published in 1910 (the second year of the Xuantong Emperor).

Min Erchang later compiled the Supplementary Collected Stele Biographies (Chinese: 碑传集补; pinyin: Bēizhuàn Jíbǔ) in 60 volumes, containing records of more than 700 people. It was completed in 1923 and published by Yanjing University in 1932.
