= Ningbo University Zone Library =

Library in Yinzhou, Ningbo, China

- 宁波大学园区图书馆（宁波市第二图书馆、鄞州区图书馆）
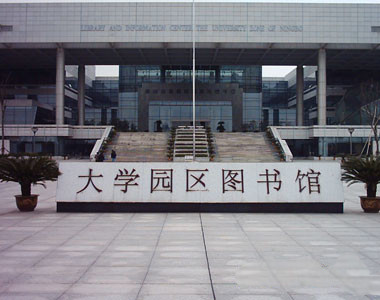
- Main Entrance
- 29.80615386330878°N 121.55903679549947°E
- Location: Yinzhou District, Ningbo, China
- Type: Public library
- Established: 28 Dec. 2003

Collection
- Size: 1.25 Million (2015）

Other information
- Director: Yan Wulin（2002 to 2015）Zhang Jianjun (2015-current）
- Website: http://www.nlic.net.cn/

The Ningbo Library and Information Center is a library in the Yinzhou District, located in the Ningbo University Zone (South). It is a shared library, serving several universities in Ningbo.

== History ==
Construction of the Ningbo Library and Information Center began in early 2002. After a state-wide search in April 2002, the Department of Education of Ningbo appointed Yan Wulin the first chief. Construction was completed in September 2003, with the grand opening on 28 December 2003. It cost 120 million yuan to build the center.

In 2004, the library won the Lu Ban Prize (the best state engineering). On 1 June 2004, the library of Yinzhou District merged with the Ningbo Library. On 7 August 2005, the number of visitors reached 10,053.

Since 1 July 2011, people are able to borrow books without bond.

As of 2015, the library contains 30,000 books, which are all made in China.

== Architecture ==
The library was designed by the architect Cheng Taining. The library makes use of natural daylight in interior spaces, as well as natural ventilation and it occupies an area of 29,270 square metres (315,100 sq ft).

== See also ==
- National first-class library
- List of libraries in China
