= Shanghai Library =

Municipal public library in Shanghai, China

Coordinates: 31°12′33″N 121°26′24″E

Shanghai Library Shanghai Institute of Scientific and Technological Information
- 上海图书馆 （上海科学技术情报研究所）

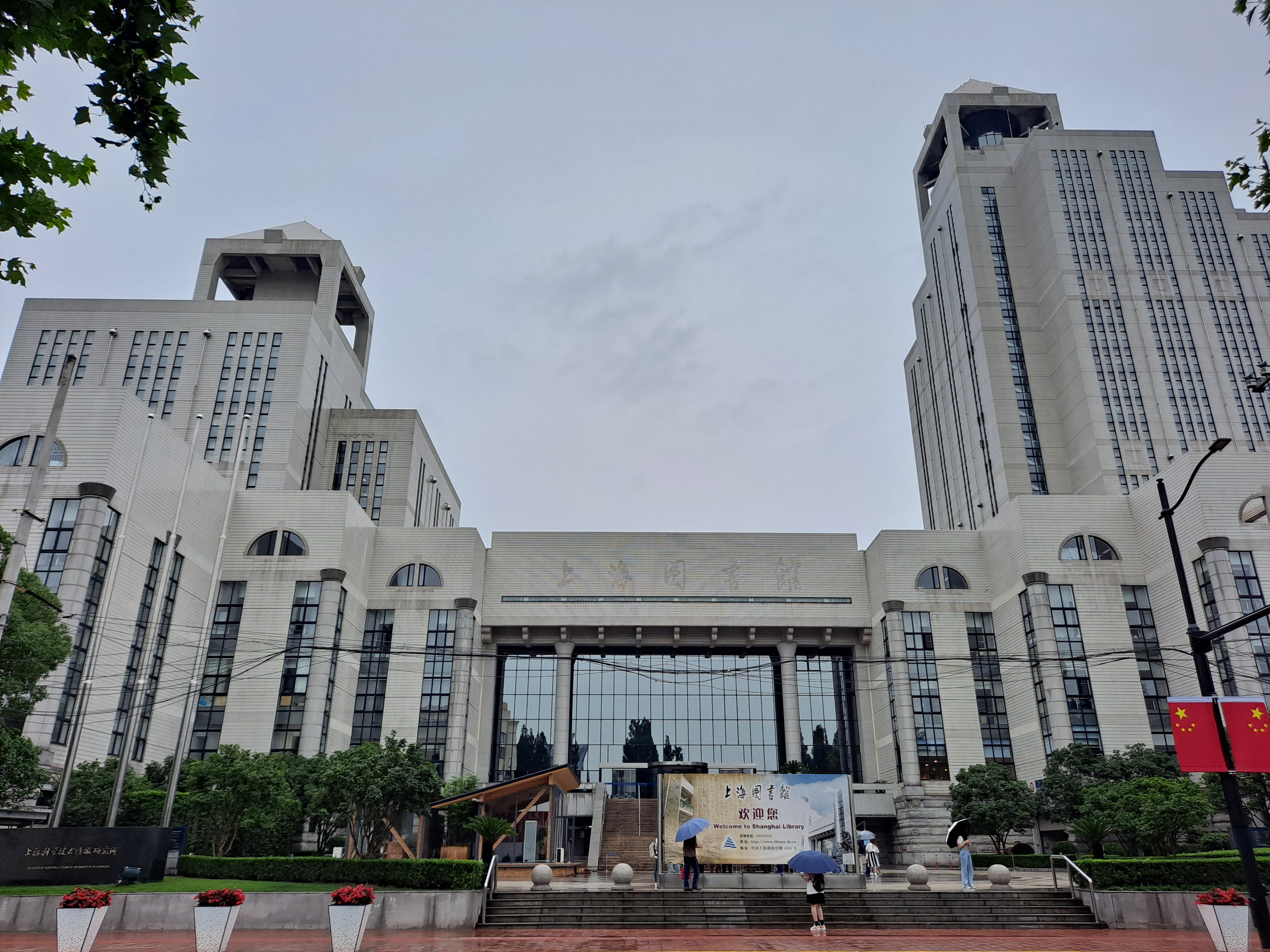
- View of main entrance in 2021
- Location: Shanghai, China
- Established: 1952
- Branches: 1

Collection
- Size: 58 million

Access and use
- Population served: Public

Other information
- Parent organization: Shanghai Municipal Committee
- Website: www.library.sh.cn

Shanghai Library
- Traditional Chinese: 上海圖書館
- Simplified Chinese: 上海图书馆
Transcriptions
Standard Mandarin
- Hanyu Pinyin: Shànghǎi Túshūguǎn

Shanghai Institute of Scientific and Technological Information
- Traditional Chinese: 上海科學技術情報研究所
- Simplified Chinese: 上海科学技术情报研究所
Transcriptions
Standard Mandarin
- Hanyu Pinyin: Shànghǎi Kēxué Jìshù Qíngbào Yánjiūsuǒ

Shanghai Library (with a second name as the Shanghai Institute of Scientific and Technological Information) is a municipal public library in Shanghai, China. It was founded by the People's Liberation Army in 1952 and is currently owned by the Shanghai Municipal Committee of the Chinese Communist Party. The library is one of the largest libraries in the world. Its main building is in Xuhui, with a branch hall in Pudong. As of 2024, it has a collection of 58 million volumes.

At 24 stories and 348 feet (106 m) tall, the library's main building is the second tallest library in the world, after the National Library of Indonesia in Jakarta.

== History ==
Shanghai Library was originally founded in 1952 by the Shanghai Military Management Committee of the People's Liberation Army.

After being transferred to Shanghai civil government management, in 1958, Shanghai Library merged with Shanghai City Science and Technology Library (上海市科学技术图书馆, formerly Mingfu Library, 明复图书馆), Shanghai City Newspaper Library (上海市报刊图书馆, formerly Hongying Library, 鸿英图书馆), and Shanghai City Historical Documents Library (上海市历史文献图书馆, formerly United Library, 合众图书馆), to become the second largest public library in the country after the National Library of China.

In November 1958, the Shanghai Institute of Scientific and Technical Information, a municipal public institution, was established. In October 1995, Shanghai Library merged with the Shanghai Institute of Scientific and Technical Information to become a research-oriented public library and a comprehensive information research center.

Shanghai Library East, a branch of the main library located in Pudong, opened in 2022. The architectural firm Schmidt Hammer Lassen was selected to construct the building in consultation with local artists, who designed it with abstract reference to the taihu stones used for inspiration by Jin dynasty scholars. The building won several local and national awards, and was among the winners of the 2026 RIBA International Award for Excellence. The East branch departs from the main building by having an open plan that makes the majority of its space available for the local community to use, while still containing 4.8 million books.

== See also ==
- National first-class library
- Libraries in the People's Republic of China

- National Library of China

- Chinese Library Classification (CLC)
- Archives in the People's Republic of China
- Pudong Library
