= List of largest libraries =

Largest libraries in the world based on number of stored items

This sortable list of the world's largest libraries includes libraries that (as of 2008) store 10 million or more items. All figures are based on data published by the libraries themselves. As there are no universally accepted standards for measuring stock, libraries may have counted their holdings in different ways, and the figures given may not be directly comparable.

== List ==
| Name | Country | Location and notes | Catalogued size (number of items) | Visitors per year | Budget | Staff |
|---|---|---|---|---|---|---|
| British Library | United Kingdom | London and Boston Spa | 200 million+ | 1.75 million | £162.5 million | 1,977 |
| Library of Congress | United States | Washington, D.C. | 178 million+ | 1.9 million | US$875.4 million | 3,149 |
| Nation's Library | Turkey | Ankara | 141.7 million | 1.9 million | US$24.25 million | 1,389 |
| Russian State Library | Russia | Moscow | 128.6 million | 949,600 | ₽4.8 billion | 1,694 |
| Shanghai Library | China | Shanghai | 58 million | | | |
| New York Public Library | United States | 92 locations in the New York City boroughs of Manhattan, the Bronx and Staten Island (2nd largest number of locations in North America). | 55 million | 18 million | US$250 million | 3,000 |
| Royal Library, Denmark | Denmark | Copenhagen and Aarhus | 45.3 million (physical items, excl. digital) | 2.46 million | 706.9 million kr | 800+ |
| National Library of China | China | Beijing | 44.24 million | 5.2 million | | 1,365 |
| National Diet Library | Japan | Tokyo and Kyoto | 44.1 million | 791,370 | ¥21.8 billion | 908 |
| German National Library | Germany | Leipzig and Frankfurt | 43.7 million | 350,713 | €57.6 million | 639 |
| Bibliothèque nationale de France | France | Paris | 41.66 million | 1.9 million | €254 million | 2,668 |
| University of California Libraries | United States | Berkeley, Davis, Irvine, Los Angeles, Merced, Riverside, San Diego, San Francisco, Santa Barbara, and Santa Cruz. Restricted to students, faculty or visitors who buy a membership. | 40.8 million | | US$295 million | 2,000+ |
| National Library of Russia | Russia | Saint Petersburg | 39.99 million | 847,045 | ₽569.2 million | 1,212 |
| University of Illinois Library | United States | Urbana, Illinois, at 30 locations. | 38 million | | US$48.7 million | |
| Bavarian State Library | Germany | Munich | 34.4 million | 1.1 million | €59.1 million | 805 |
| Biblioteca Nacional de España | Spain | Madrid | 33.1 million | | €29.2 million | 482 |
| Library and Archives Canada | Canada | Ottawa, Halifax, Winnipeg, Vancouver. Largely a free reference library. | 27 million | | CAD165 million | 853 |
| Library of the Russian Academy of Sciences | Russia | Saint Petersburg | 26.5 million | | | |
| Berlin State Library | Germany | Berlin | 23.4 million | 1.4 million | | |
| Boston Public Library | United States | Boston, Massachusetts at 26 locations. | 22.4 million | 3.2 million | US$38.9 million | |
| New York State Library | United States | Albany, New York | 20 million | | | |
| Harvard Library | United States | Cambridge, Massachusetts Restricted to students, faculty, or visitors who buy a membership. | 18.9 million | | | 922 |
| National Library of Sweden | Sweden | Stockholm | 18 million | | 364.5 million kr | |
| University of Michigan Library | United States | Ann Arbor, Michigan, at one location largely. Free borrowing for staff, students, and native and indigenous people. All others may purchase borrowing rights. | 16.1 million | | | |
| University of Toronto Libraries | Canada | Toronto and Mississauga at 44 locations 28 of which are accessible to the public. Non-affiliated personnel/students or those without eduroam or OCUL access cannot utilize technology or borrowing services at UTL branches. Select libraries offer memberships and/or guest passes to non-affiliated members of the public. | 16 million | | CA$133 million | |
| Vernadsky National Library of Ukraine | Ukraine | Kyiv | 15.5 million | 500,000 | 50.3 million ₴ | 900 |
| Yale Library | United States | New Haven, Connecticut at 12 locations. | 15.2 million | | | |
| National Library of Iran | Iran | Tehran | 15 million | | | |
| University of Chicago Library | United States | Chicago | 14.2 million | 1.1 million | | |
| National Library of Scotland | Scotland | Edinburgh and Glasgow | 14 million | | | |
| Bodleian Library | United Kingdom | Oxford | 13.8 million printed items, plus special and digital collections | 1.7 million readers, 865,191 visitors. | £57.8 million | 562.76 (FTE) |
| Hong Kong Public Library | Hong Kong | Hong Kong | 11.36 million | | HK$776.2 million | |
| National Library of Poland | Poland | Warsaw | 10.6 million | 81,043 | | 502 |
| Toronto Public Library | Canada | 100 locations in Toronto | 10.5 million | 13.4 million | CA$252,300,000 | 2,500 |
| National Library of Australia | Australia | Headquartered in Canberra with seven locations in total | 21 billion items (includes TROVE webarchive) | 388,422 on site visitors | Australian dollar $102,515,000 | 428 |

== See also ==
- List of largest libraries in Italy (in Italian)
- List of largest libraries in Russia (in Russian)
- List of largest libraries in the United States
