= Sibu classification =

Sibu classification (simplified Chinese: 四部分类法; traditional Chinese: 四部分類法; pinyin: Sìbù fēnlèi fǎ) is a traditional Chinese classification system for categorising texts.

== History ==
By the Han dynasty, the first attempt to categorise Chinese classics was done by Liu Xiang (劉向; 77 BCE – 6 CE) and his son Liu Xin (劉歆; 46 BCE – 23 CE) into 6 distinct categories with a general catalogue making it a 7-part system. (Chinese: 七略; pinyin: Qīlüè).

This classification system included the following categories,

- Summary of the Six Arts (simplified Chinese: 六艺略; traditional Chinese: 六藝略; pinyin: Liùyìlüè) - Confucian classics and traditional teachings.
- Summary of the Masters (simplified Chinese: 诸子略; traditional Chinese: 諸子略; pinyin: Zhūzǐlüè) - Writings of various philosophical schools.
- Summary of Poetry & Rhapsodies (simplified Chinese: 诗赋略; traditional Chinese: 詩賦略; pinyin: Shīfùlüè) - Poetry, literary anthologies, and Fu collections.
- Summary of Military Texts (simplified Chinese: 兵书略; traditional Chinese: 兵書略; pinyin: Bīngshūlüè) - Books on warfare, military strategy, and tactics.
- Summary of Numerology & Techniques (simplified Chinese: 数术略; traditional Chinese: 數術略; pinyin: Shùshùlüè) - Astronomy, calendrical science, mathematics, divination, geomancy, and medicine.
- Summary of Prescriptions & Techniques (Chinese: 方技略; pinyin: Fāngjìlüè) - Medicine, pharmacology, and healing techniques.

During the Jin dynasty, Xun Xu (荀勗; 221 – 289) complied Zhongjing Xinbu (中經新簿) based on a previous work, which originally had six categories but was now condensed into four.

- Jia (甲部) - classics
- Yi (乙部) - philosophical writings
- Bing (丙部) - historical works
- Ding (丁部) - poetry and rhapsodies

These categories were reminiscent of the current categories of the Sibu classification. These categories were later redefined by Li Chong (李充) by moving historical works into Yi (乙部) and philosophical writings into Bing (丙部).

The Sibu classification was formally established by the Tang dynasty, occurring in the work, Suishu·Jingjizhi (隋書經籍志). The work adopted names for the four categories, 經, 史, 子, and 集. This system was in used up to the Qing dynasty and influenced classification methods in Korea, Japan, and Vietnam.

== Categories ==
- Classics (simplified Chinese: 经; traditional Chinese: 經; pinyin: jīng) - Confucian classics and authoritative texts essential to Chinese intellectual and bureaucratic traditions. Includes books such as Book of Changes, the Analects, and the Book of Rites.
- History (Chinese: 史; pinyin: shǐ) - Historical records, dynastic histories, and biographies. Includes books such as Shiji.
- Philosophy (Chinese: 子; pinyin: zǐ) - Works from various schools of thought, such as Taoism, Legalism, Buddhism, as well as scientific, medical, and technical texts.
- Literature (Chinese: 集; pinyin: jí) - Poetry, prose, literary critiques, and collected works of famous authors. Such as the Three Hundred Tang Poems.

== Influence ==
- The Hán Nôm Special Collection Digitization Project, a digital library of Vietnamese texts digitised by the Nôm Foundation, uses the Sibu classification.
