= Lei Family Bridge =

Village in China

Lei Family Bridge was a village in the outskirts of Beijing. The village was demolished in 2009, with plans of building a golf course. The plans were never executed, and the village remains in ruins, as of 2017.

The village consisted of about 300 families, all of whom were moved to distant parts of Beijing city. The village was on the key pilgrimage route to Mount Yaji (a shrine dedicated to Our Lady of the Azure Clouds) and was a rest stop for pilgrims. The village is named after the Lei family, known for its pilgrimage group, which performed stories of the imperial courts (as old as 800 years old) for pilgrims visiting the shrine. As of 2014, the last member of the Lei family would gather with his colleagues at the highway overpass near the original site of the village and perform for the public.

Among the few buildings and structures still intact is the village headquarters of the Chinese Communist Party and a temple, where the Lei family performed their entertainment routine. The temple was constructed in the 18th century using tiled roofs and wooden beams and is enclosed by a seven-foot high wall.
