= Chinese Library Classification =

National library classification scheme in China

The Chinese Library Classification (CLC; Chinese: 中国图书馆分类法), also known as Classification for Chinese Libraries (CCL), is effectively the national library classification scheme in the People's Republic of China. It is used in almost all primary and secondary schools, universities, academic institutions, as well as public libraries. It is also used by publishers to classify all books published in China.

The Book Classification of Chinese Libraries (BCCL) was first published in 1975, under the auspices of China's Administrative Bureau of Cultural Affairs. Its fourth edition (1999) was renamed CLC. In September 2010, the fifth edition was published by National Library of China Publishing House. CLC has twenty-two top-level categories, and inherits a Marxist orientation from its earlier editions. (For instance, category A is Marxism, Leninism, Maoism & Deng Xiaoping Theory.) It contains a total of 43,600 categories, many of which are recent additions, meeting the needs of a rapidly changing nation.

== See also ==
- National first-class library
- Libraries in the People's Republic of China
- Ningbo Library
- Sibu classification
