= Archives in China =

On the basis of the General Rules for Archives published in 1983, historical archives were being expanded at the provincial and county levels. Two of the most important archives were the First Historical Archives of China (FHAC), located in Beijing containing the archives of the Ming and Qing dynasties, and the Second Historical Archives of China (SHAC), located in Nanjing containing the archives of the Kuomintang period. And the Central Archives (the State Archives Administration) contains the archives of the Communist Party and the People's Republic. A number of foreign scholars have been granted access to these archives. In 1987 public and research libraries still faced serious space, management, and service problems. Even with the special efforts being made to solve these problems, it was clear that they would not be quickly resolved.

In the late 1980s, China was experiencing an active educational and cultural life. Students were staying in school longer, educational standards were being raised, and facilities were being improved. Intellectuals were encouraged to develop their expertise, especially in the scientific and technical spheres, and a wide variety of traditional and modern literary and art forms were allowed to flourish. This situation was likely to continue as long as it served the interest of economic modernization and posed no threat to the political establishment.

== See also ==
- Libraries in China
- Culture of China
- Education in China
- Archives of Yuhuan
