= Ningbo Library =

Public library in Ningbo, Zhejiang, China

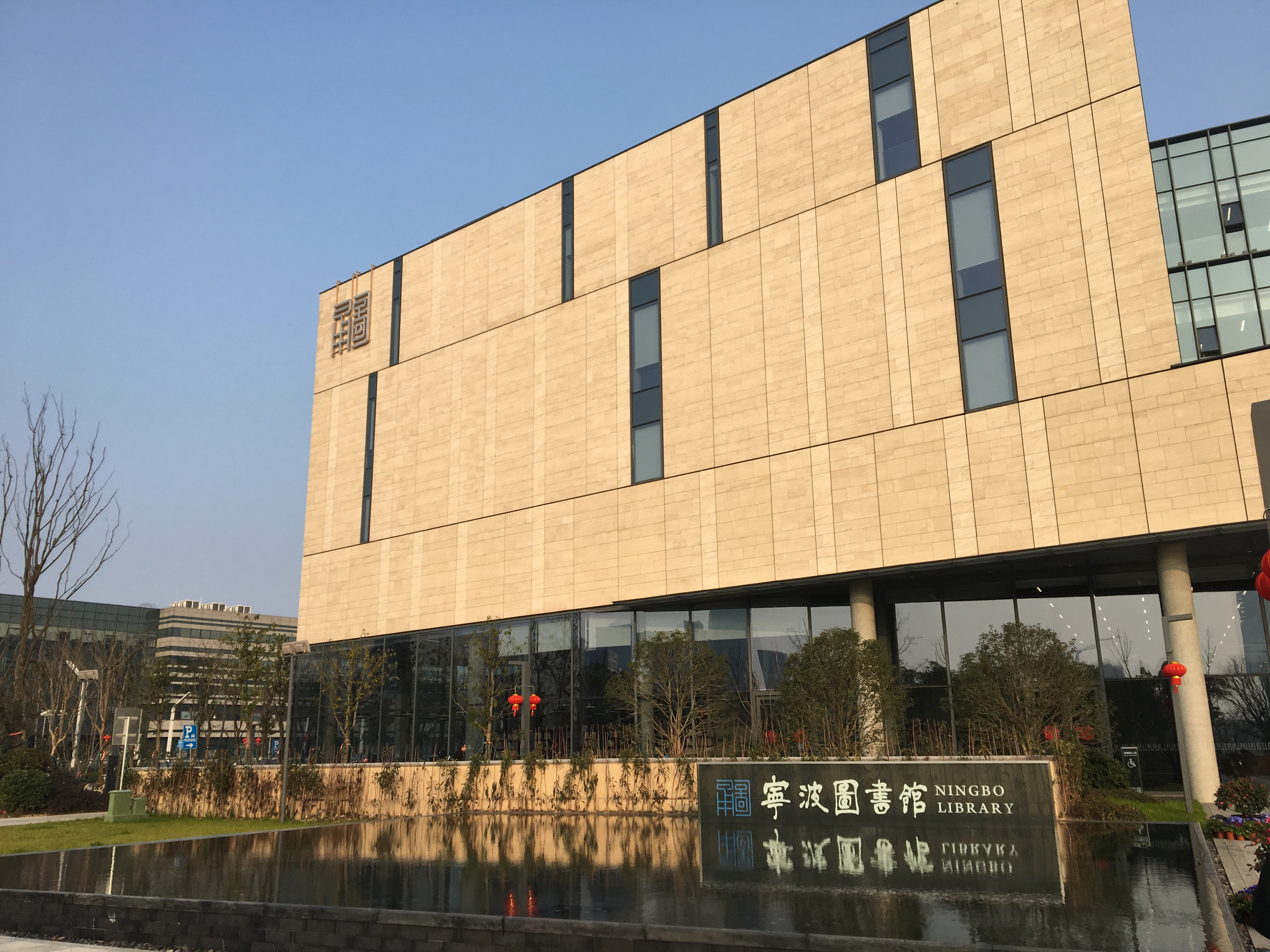
- Exterior view of the new Ningbo Library
- 29°51′37.63″N 121°37′23.88″E （宁波图书馆新馆）
- Location: Zhejiang Province Ningbo City Yinzhou District 2100 Ningpen Road (New Hall) Haishu District 135 Yongfeng Road (Yongfeng Hall), PRC
- Type: Public library
- Established: 1927
- Reference to legal mandate: "Public Library Law of the People's Republic of China" "Provisional Regulations on the Registration and Management of Public Institutions" "Regulations on the Promotion of Reading for All in Ningbo" "Charter of Ningbo Library"
- Branch of: Ningbo Municipal Bureau of Culture, Radio, Television, and Tourism
- Branches: 8 buildings (2 main buildings, 6 regional buildings)

Collection
- Items collected: Paper books and periodicals, newspapers, electronic books and periodicals, handwritten notes, calligraphy, picture books, photographs, music and film materials
- Size: 3,353,374 million books (pieces) 60,881 million ancient books 125 TB of electronic documents (by the end of 2021)

Access and use
- Access requirements: Ningbo public library card
- Population served: Mainly all citizens of Ningbo

Other information
- Budget: 10,361.26 million (2021)
- Employees: 164 (by the end of 2021)
- Website: www.nblib.cn
- References: Monday: 13:00-21:00, Tuesday-Sunday: 9:00-21:00

Ningbo Library is a public library located in Ningbo, Zhejiang Province, China. It is under the jurisdiction of the Ningbo Municipal People's Government, under the administration of the Ningbo Municipal Bureau of Culture, Radio, Television, and Tourism, and is a legal entity established by the Ningbo Municipal Government as a public welfare institution. As the center of Ningbo's public library service system, Ningbo Library not only has paper and electronic books, journals, and newspapers but also has a wide range of collections such as handwritten books, calligraphy, picture albums, photos, music, film, and television materials. Among them, the library has collected the writings of famous Ningbo people as well as Ningbo local newspapers and magazines in the work of preserving in situ cultural relics, which is the characteristic collection of the library. Based on the above-mentioned collection, the library has conducted research on literature resources in Ningbo and surrounding areas. By the end of 2020, the library had a collection of 3.1 million paper books (including nearly 80000 ancient books), over 3.6 million electronic books, and 15000 electronic journals.

Ningbo Library is a national first-class library accredited by the Ministry of Culture and Tourism. Formerly known as Ningbo Municipal Library, which was opened in September 1927. After several restructuring and relocations, it now operates two main buildings. Located at 135 Yongfeng Road, Haishu District, Ningbo. Yongfeng Hall (the old hall) was built with funds donated by Yue-Kong Pao and opened on May 1, 1989. The new building, located at 2100 Ningpen Road, Yinzhou District, is located in Ningbo East New Town and was designed by Danish SHL Architects and opened on December 28, 2018.

== History ==
=== Before the establishment of the People's Republic of China ===
In 1884, Xue Fucheng, one of the leaders of the Qing Guangxu Movement and the Self-Strengthening Movement, built the Kōraku-en (now located in Zhongshan Park, Ningbo) on the basis of Duxiu Mountain to the west of the Taoist Office. The Kōraku-en was built to provide a place for educating people, enlightening their minds, and providing space for the scholars to study, with a collection of books in the Lanxiu Hall. In 1894, Wu Yinsun succeeded Ning Shaobing as a reserve Taoist, renaming the collection of books of Lanxiu Hall Library to the Chongshi Academy Library, and increasing the library's collection by 1535 through book purchases and donations. In 1905, Chongshi Academy became the Ningbo Education Association. In 1913, the guilds of the six counties under Ningbo Prefecture built three western-style buildings in Kōraku-en, where all the books of Xue Fucheng, Wu Yinsun, and later additions were hidden, and the three library buildings were named "Xue Lou". During this period, with the increasing demand for knowledge, society spontaneously formed libraries with equal and open nature, such as the Siming Society Library, Siming Youth Library, Ningbo Youth Library, Youth Association Library, and Popular Library.

In 1926, the Siming Society Library, Ningbo Youth Library, and Popular Library held a joint meeting in Kōraku-en to discuss the establishment of the Ningbo Public Library. In 1927, after the victory of the National Revolutionary Army's Northern Expedition, Ningbo was established as a city. In May, Ningbo Mayor Luo Huiqiao decided to convert Xue Lou into the Ningbo Municipal Library. The Ningbo Municipal Library officially opened in September, with Zhang Ruzhao as its first director. The library becomes the first real public library in the history of Ningbo and the predecessor of Ningbo Library. In 1931, the establishment of Ningbo City was abolished, and the Ningbo Municipal Library merged with the Yinxian County Library. The library was renamed the Yin County Library. In 1932, due to the narrow building, under the negotiation of the Ningbo Education Association and Ningbo Chamber of Commerce, the library exchanged places with the National Goods Exhibition Hall and moved to Fuxian Street (today's Fuxiao Street). After the outbreak of the Second Sino-Japanese War in 1937, the library moved back to its original location in Zhongshan Park.

=== After the establishment of the People's Republic of China ===
After the People's Liberation Army conquered Ningbo on May 25, 1949, the Ningbo Municipal Military Control Commission was established. The Ministry of Culture and Education of the Military Control Commission took over the Yinxian County Library in June. At the time of the takeover, there were more than 15000 books in the collection, about half of which were ancient books. The collection of books was organized by the Ningbo Municipal Bureau of Culture and Education. The available books were transferred to the reading room of Ningbo People's Cultural Center, and the ancient books were moved to the Tianyi Ge Antiquities Exhibition Hall. The book and newspaper reading room of Ningbo People's Cultural Hall inherited the functions of the Ningbo Public Library during this period.

In 1953, Ningbo City Library was re-established at the old site of Zhongshan Park, with an area of 660 square meters and a collection of 8946 books. Most of the books in the collection are from the former Yinxian County Library, which was transferred back to the reading room of the People's Cultural Center. On September 9, 1962, the library was relocated to the former site of Santa Casa da Misericórdia in Sangyuan Lane, Yaoxing Street, Haishu District (119 Yaoxing Street). After the relocation, the area of the library was expanded to 1400 square meters, with a collection and editing room, a lending place, an ancient book department, a children's reading room, and a circulation guidance group. As of the Cultural Revolution, the library had a total of 159249 books, including approximately 73000 ancient books. After the start of the Cultural Revolution, in October 1969, the library was occupied as a "May Seventh Cadre School" in the city's cultural system, and the library was subsequently closed. On February 21, 1970, the establishment of the Ningbo Municipal Library was abolished and merged with the Ningbo Municipal Cultural Administration Commission to form the Ningbo Library and Cultural Heritage Museum. After the end of the Cultural Revolution, the Ningbo Library resumed its establishment in 1978.

In November 1988, the Ningbo Library moved to the new site of Yongfeng Road, which was donated and built by Yue-Kong Pao, a resident of Ningbo and the world ship king. The new site faces Yaojiang and has a building area of 8187 square meters. The new site of Yongfeng Road officially opened to the public on May 1, 1989. In 2001, the Ningbo Municipal Government invested in the expansion and renovation of the library, and the total area of the city's library buildings reached the current 12000 square meters. At that time, there were more than ten service windows, including book lending rooms, children's lending rooms, newspaper reading rooms, ancient local literature reading rooms, Tianyi Music Hall, foreign language reading rooms, and departments such as the editorial department, tutoring department, technical department, and office. In 2013, the Ningbo Municipal Government proposed in the minutes of the special meeting to build a new library building in Ningbo East New Town. The new building was completed and partially opened in November 2018, and opened on December 28. The library also designed a new library logo by taking advantage of the opportunity of the new library's building and renamed it Ningbo Library from Ningbo City Library. After the new building was put into use, it assumed the central function of the Ningbo Public Library service system.

== Buildings ==
Ningbo Library now operates two main buildings, one on Yongfeng Road, which was donated by Bao Yugang and opened in 1989, and a new building in Ningbo East New Town, which was opened in 2018.

=== Yongfeng Building ===
The Yongfeng building of Ningbo Library is located at 135 Yongfeng Road, Haishu District. It is named Yue-Kong Pao Library in honor of Yue-Kong Pao, a famous Ningbo resident who donated HK$5 million to build the building. The name is no longer in official reports, but it has never been explicitly discontinued. The building was built in 1988 and opened on May 1, 1989, with a construction area of 8187 square meters, consisting of a five-story library, a four-story reading building, a three-story multifunctional hall, and a two-story entrance hall. The library building is 1508 square meters, the reading building is 1600 square meters, the multifunctional hall building is 1100 square meters, and the entrance hall building is 516 square meters. After completion, the computer network and other equipment as firefighting and electrical facilities in the building have been upgraded or added successively.

In 2001, the Ningbo Municipal Government invested over 20 million yuan to further expand the library on a large scale. Currently, the total building area of the library has reached 15368 square meters. Among them, there are 7,067 square meters of reader's lending room, 4,140 square meters of bookstore, and 825 square meters of lecture hall and meeting room.

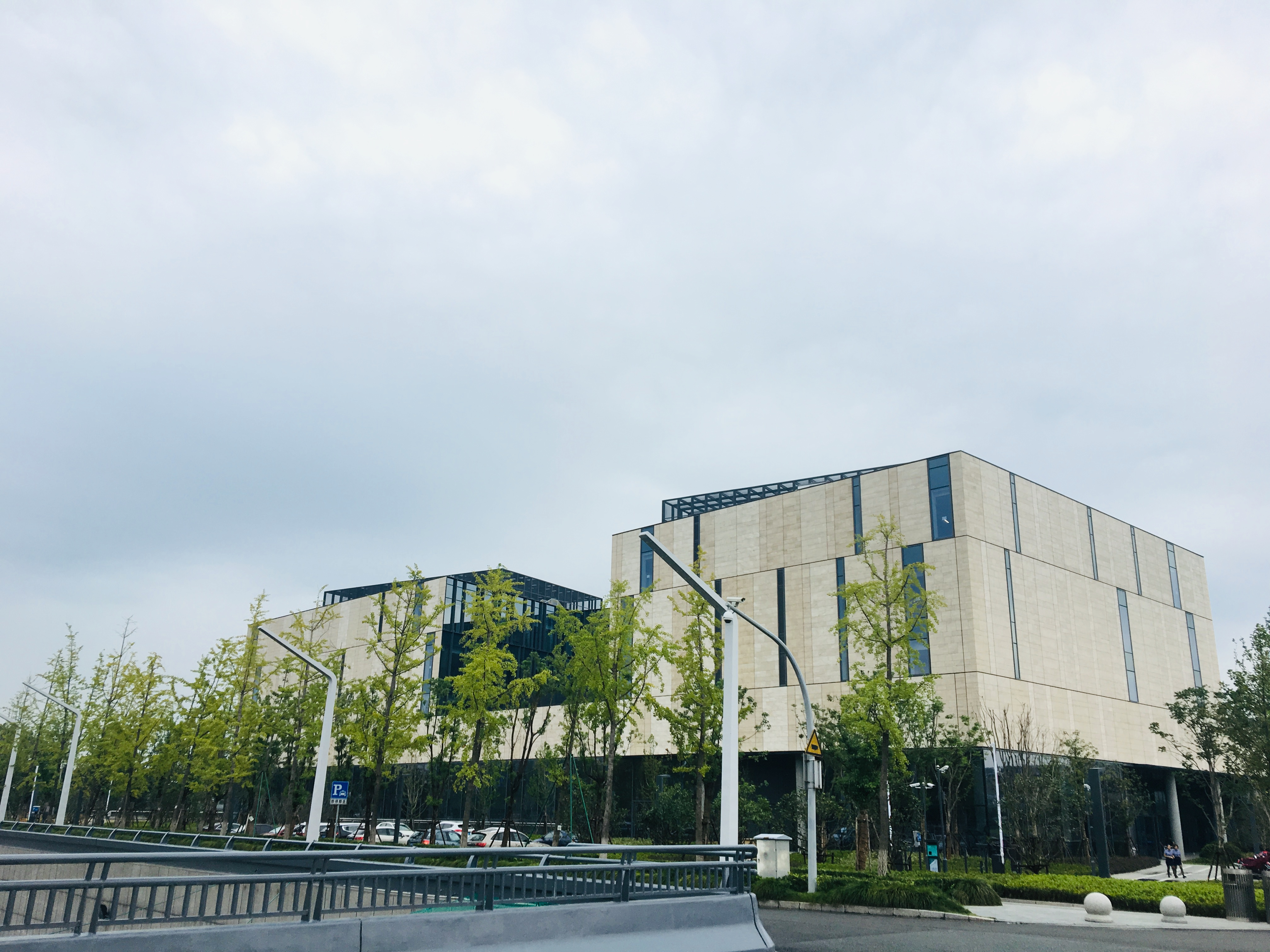
Exterior view of the new building

=== New Building ===
The new building of Ningbo Library is located in Ningbo East New Town, adjacent to the Ningbo Municipal Government and Ningbo Administrative Service Center. The construction of the new library began on August 17, 2015, and the main body was completed at the end of 2016. It was officially completed and accepted on November 30, 2018, and opened on December 28, 2018.

In 2013, the minutes of the special meeting of the Ningbo Municipal Government proposed the construction of a new building for the Ningbo Library in Ningbo East New Town. In the international invitation competition for the conceptual design of the new building of Ningbo Library held that year, the Shanghai office of SHL Architects in Denmark won the top spot among the plans of four Chinese companies and two foreign companies. The office has also provided design services for many libraries, such as the East Hall of Shanghai Library, the New Hall of Shanghai Children's Library, as well as Ningbo Daily Newspaper Group Headquarters, which is also located in Ningbo East New Town. The new building was awarded the 2020 Qianjiang Cup Quality Engineering Award for the construction project in Zhejiang Province.

The construction investment for the new building is about 249 million yuan. The building is a box structure with five floors, including one underground floor and four above-ground floors. The building area reaches 31405 square meters and the height is about 24 meters. The building is centered around the atrium and leads up through the central corridor to three huge open layout spaces, connecting the three buildings in the east, west, and south. The new pavilion widely adopts green building technologies, including passive energy conservation through measures and technologies such as using natural light to help improve indoor lighting, using an atrium structure to achieve excellent natural ventilation, and using Béton brut materials to help maintain the building's temperature in summer and winter.

The new building has an open cultural market of 8000 square meters. The expected reception capacity of the new building is 7000 to 8000 people, and there will be 3000 fixed self-study tables. The first floor of the new building is equipped with a mezzanine floor, which not only includes the lobby, borrowing, and reading areas (rooms), but also includes functional spaces such as the editing and processing room, distribution center, self-study room, and coffee shop. On the second floor, there is an ancient book reading room, a professional ancient book restoration area, a constant temperature and humidity dense stack room, an exhibition hall, and two leisure terraces set up for the east and west. The third floor is the featured library collection area and music theme reading area. The music-themed reading area consists of a paper book reading room, a vinyl record appreciation area, a Hifi appreciation room, a music salon, and a professional recording studio. The fourth floor consists of Qiao Shi's study room, creative space, training room, and salon room. The underground floor of the building is connected to Citizen Square and has a reader's restaurant.

The new building is positioned as the central library of the Ningbo Public Library Service System, including the Ningbo Regional Literature Guarantee Center, Public Library Digital Resources and Service Center, Local Literature Digitalization Construction Center, Paper Book Collection and Distribution Center, Public Library Business Training and Education Center, and Public Library Service Network Development Center.

== Library Collection ==
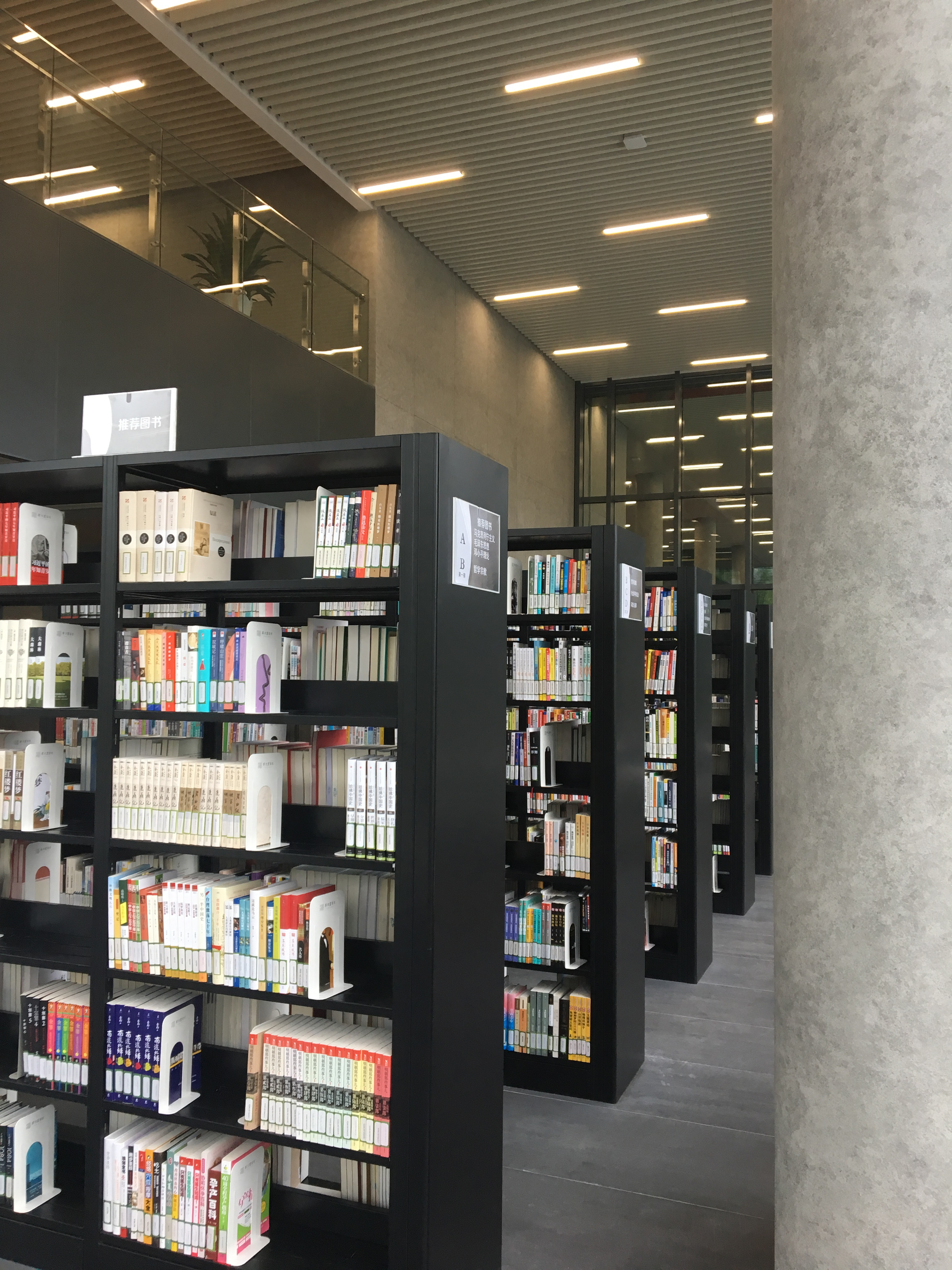
Bookshelves in the self-service reading room of the new library

In 1997, the Ningbo Library established a local literature storeroom, which is now located on the third floor of the new library. There are rich materials in the local literature library, covering the political, economic, cultural, and other fields of Ningbo, and collecting the works of Ningbo literati, academicians, and other famous people, as well as the local newspapers and Chorography of Ningbo. The local literature library is one of the distinctive collections of Ningbo Library. There are more than 40000 volumes of local literature, more than 3000 kinds of local newspapers and periodicals, including more than 1000 kinds of local chronicles, and special collections for some large donations. In addition, the library also provides characteristic collections such as art books and books for the blind. Qiao Shi's study room is located on the fourth floor of the new library, containing over 26000 books of various types, over 300 audiovisual documents, over 100 calligraphy and painting works, and over 20000 photo materials.

By the end of 2020, there were approximately 3.08 million paper collections (including approximately 60000 ancient books), 69 electronic databases, and 104TB of electronic literature. The number of books in the library is still continuously increasing, with 252000 new books added in 2020.

== Library Services ==
=== Overview of Library Services ===
Ningbo Library had 560,000 visitors in 2020, 1.28 million visits and 180 million clicks to the online library, with a total of 230,000 certified readers; 2.58 million books were lent out and 710,000 visits were made; 677 reading events (including 490 online) were held, with 4.37 million participants. The fiscal budget for 2021 was 115.493 million yuan. The library has a total of 12 subordinate departments, including the Office, Logistics Management Department, Academic Research Department, Literature Lending Department, Reading Promotion Department, Career Development Department, Special Collection Literature Department, Resource Acquisition and Editing Department, Technical Research and Development Department, Cultural Information Center, Special Activity Department, and Reader Service Department. As of the end of 2020, Ningbo Library had a total of 164 librarians (including 81 professional and technical personnel).

=== Customer Service ===
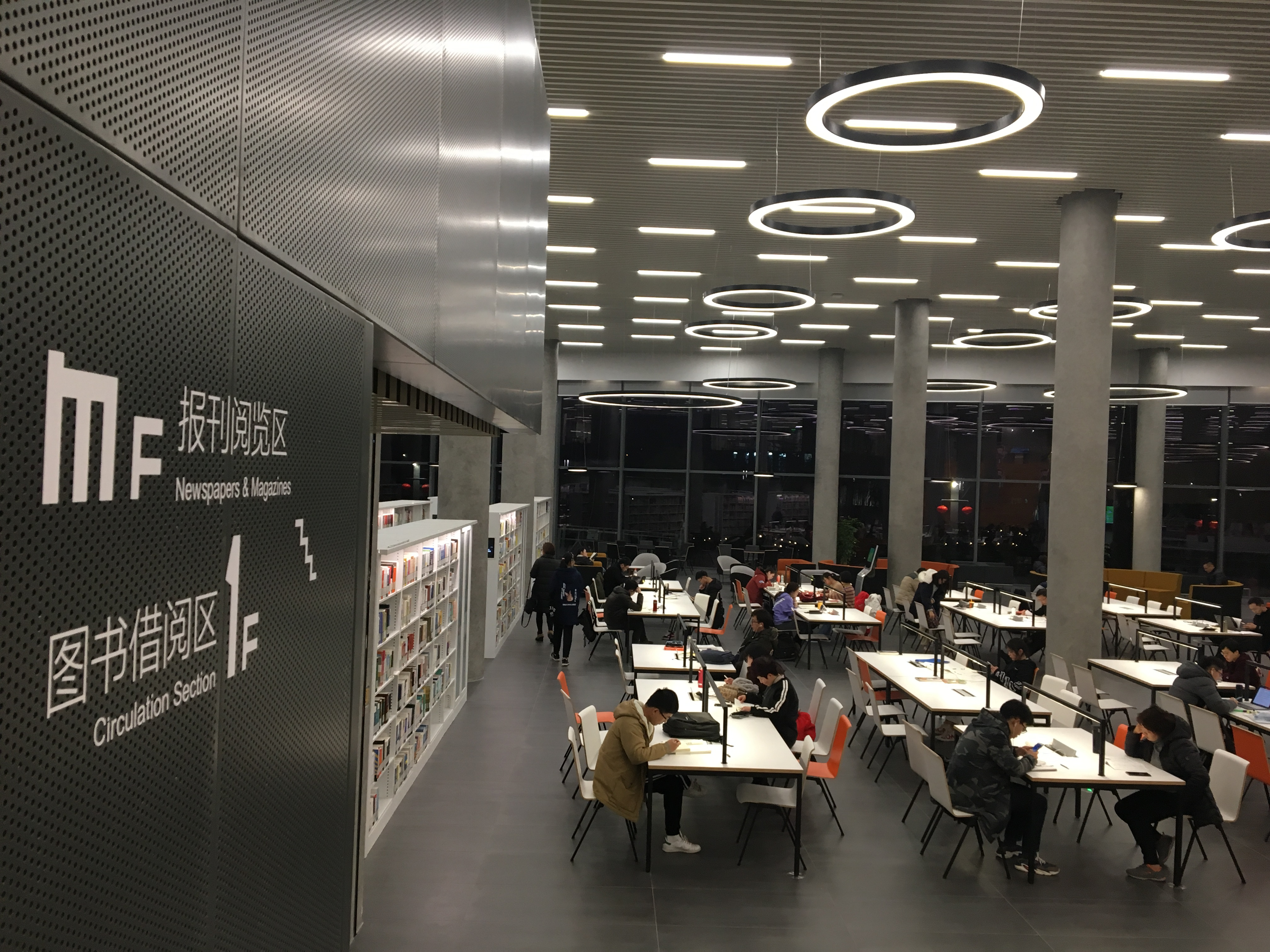
Reading Room, First Floor, New Library

The Yongfeng building and the new building each have a readers' service desk that provides readers with basic services such as library card processing and consultation, as well as the Tianyi Music Hall for the appreciation and exchange of music and film materials.

The Yongfeng building has three lending rooms and two reading rooms. The three lending rooms are the General Lending Room, the Social Science Lending Room, and the Children's Lending Room, which provide open-shelf lending of basic books, social science books, and children's books, respectively. The four reading rooms are respectively the Newspaper Reading Room and the Electronic Reading Room, which provide reading services for the back issues and newspapers and digital resources in the library since the founding of China. In addition, there are 125 self-study rooms for readers, 250 lecture halls for activities, and a readers' lounge that provides food, culture, and library business supplies.

The new library has three lending areas, five reading areas, two special study rooms, and two characteristic spaces. The three reading areas are the book lending area, the social science lending area, and the children's lending area. The five reading areas are respectively the newspaper reading area, ancient book reading area, electronic reading area, local literature reading area (art and reference reading areas are attached), and foreign language reading area. The two special study rooms are the Friendship City Study Room, which collects books, paintings, drawings, and other related documents gifted from Ningbo's friendly cities, and the Qiao Shi Study Room, which collects books, handwritten notes, paintings, photographs, and relics from the private collection of Qiao Shi, the former Chairman of the Standing Committee of the National People's Congress. The two featured spaces are: Art Space for cultural and art exhibition activities, and Creativity Space for creative exchange and practical activities. There is also a 300-seat lecture hall and a 200-seat multi-purpose hall. Unlike the Yongfeng building, the new building has a self-service library that provides self-service lending services, a visually impaired reading room that provides braille reading services, and a total of 4 study rooms for reservation.

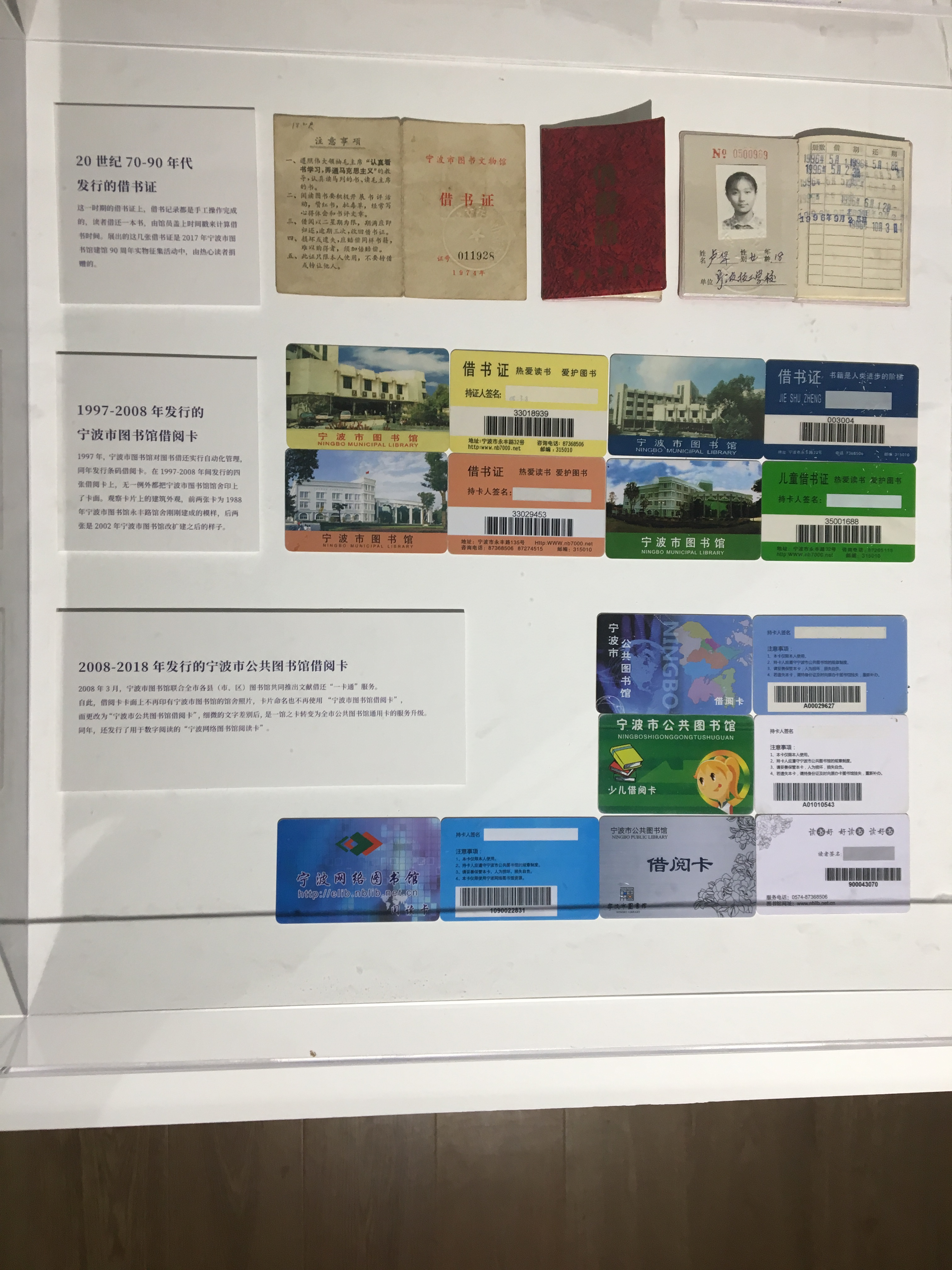
Various library cards used by the library

=== Digital Services ===
Ningbo Library also provides digital literature services. The online service section provides Document retrieval and download services such as Ningbo special database online search and Ningbo Library network database. You can access the corresponding literature services by logging in to the IP address within Ningbo through IP. In addition, Ningbo Library is also a member unit of Ningbo Digital Library, including Ningbo University Zone Library and other major public libraries in Ningbo and Ningbo University and other universities in Ningbo. The digital library is mainly undertaken by Ningbo University Zone Library. The digital library service was launched on January 18, 2008, achieving the sharing of literature resources among various co-construction units. IP addresses within Ningbo City can access various Chinese and foreign literature in the digital library. In 2020, the digital resources of the library had 180 million visits and 1.92 million downloads throughout the year.

=== Off-site services ===
In addition to the Daxie Development Zone Branch, Meixu Branch, Free Trade Zone Branch, Dongqian Lake Branch, Lihuili East Hospital Branch, Human Geography Museum, and other branch libraries, Ningbo Library also uses buses or local space to set up mobile libraries in towns, campuses, government agencies, etc. And provide free books and journals, as well as a series of services such as free book replacement, "I'll pay for books if you order", and "I'll buy if you choose". In addition, the library has also set up a certain number of 24-hour self-help libraries in Haishu District, Yinzhou District, Jiangbei District, Zhenhai District, Beilun District, Xiangshan County, and some subway stations to promote the Tianyi book appointment service. The monthly lending and returning volume of Gulou Station of Ningbo Rail Transit rank first among more than 200 credit lending counters nationwide.

=== Research and publications ===
The Ningbo Library has four types of publications, one of which is the local literature publication "Ningbo Literature". The publication was launched in August 2019 and its main content is to explore, present, organize, and study literature resources in Ningbo and surrounding areas. The second is the Ningbo Library Newsletter, which mainly publishes library work information, academic research, and article reviews in the Ningbo area. In addition, there are "Tianyi Wenjian" and "Tianyi Wenhui". The former is a book information and book review publication, while the latter is a political abstract specifically for reference by leaders and cadres at all levels, representatives of the National People's Congress, and members of the Chinese People's Political Consultative Conference in Ningbo.

== See also ==
- List of libraries in China
