= Consumers United for Evidence-based Healthcare =

US consumer group coalition

- Formation: 2003
- Type: National
- Purpose: Empowering consumers to make the best use of evidence-based healthcare
- Headquarters: Johns Hopkins Bloomberg School of Public Health; Baltimore, Maryland
- Official language: English
- Website: consumersunited.org

Consumers United for Evidence-based Healthcare (CUE) is a coalition of health advocacy consumer groups interested in evidence-based healthcare. It was formed in 2003.

CUE provides leadership to other efforts aimed at involving patients in the research process, strengthening the voice of consumers in healthcare research, which has been called for over two decades but which has not always been successfully implemented free of commercial influence. By creating opportunities for networking and learning, similar to those available to health professionals, CUE members can be empowered and have an ongoing source of information and tools about health issues of concern. This would, at least in theory, give the member groups an edge in advocacy activities.

Since its establishment, CUE members have been asked to testify on national committees, contribute letters to the biomedical literature, sit on national professional society steering groups and advisory panels, and many other contributions.

== CUE member organizations ==
As a condition of membership, CUE members may not receive the majority of their funding from commercial sources. All CUE members agree at the time of membership application to attend an annual CUE meeting to set priorities, receive training, and collaborate with other consumer and health advocates throughout the United States. CUE membership is currently about 50 member groups; the earliest members include the National Breast Cancer Coalition, Consumer Reports, and the Black Women's Health Imperative, among others.

- Annie Appleseed Project
- Association of Cancer Patient Educators
- Black Women's Health Alliance
- Black Women's Health Imperative
- California Breast Cancer Organizations (CABCO)
- Celiac Disease Foundation
- Center for Science in the Public Interest
- Centering Healthcare Institute
- Cherab Foundation
- Childbirth Connection Programs of the Partnership for Women and Families
- Children With Diabetes Foundation
- Citizens for Patient Safety
- Connecticut Center for Patient Safety
- Consumer Reports
- Faces and Voices of Recovery
- Families USA
- Hepatitis B Initiative of Washington D.C.
- Homebirth Summit Consumer Engagement Task Force
- Lamaze International
- LymeDisease.org
- Maine Coalition to Fight Prostate Cancer
- MedShadow Foundation
- Mothers Against Medical Error
- National Alliance for Caregiving
- National Breast Cancer Coalition
- National Center for Health Research
- National Center for Transgender Equality
- National Committee to Preserve Social Security and Medicare
- National Consumers League
- National Council on Aging
- National Environmental Education Foundation
- National LGBT Cancer Network
- National Mental Health Consumers' Self-Help Clearinghouse
- National Women's Health Network
- Nueva Vida
- Our Bodies Ourselves
- Ovarian Cancer Advocacy Alliance of San Diego
- Patient Safety America
- Philadelphia Ujima
- Rhode Island Breast Cancer Coalition
- SafeMinds
- SCAD Alliance
- TMJ Association
- VHL Alliance
- Washington Advocates for Patient Safety
- Young Survival Coalition

== Conferences and training ==
CUE has hosted three Summit conferences, in 2007, 2010, and 2017, attended by health advocacy organizations and other key stakeholder groups. CUE also holds an annual membership meeting in Washington, DC, and disseminates slidecasting from the meeting to the public. Past speakers have included:

- Robert Califf (Commissioner of the Food and Drug Administration from 2016 to 2017)
- Vinay Prasad (Physician, Author of Ending Medical Reversal: Improving Outcomes, Saving Lives)
- Deborah Zarin (Current Director of ClinicalTrials.gov)
- Diana Zuckerman (President of the National Center for Health Research and The Cancer Prevention and Treatment Fund)

All of CUE's training materials are available free of charge to the public. CUE has produced these materials with the input of patients, consumers, guideline developers, and health professionals. The resources available on the CUE website are as follows:

- Free Cochrane Courses
  - Understanding Evidence-based Healthcare: A Foundation for Action
  - The FDA and the Regulation of Healthcare Interventions
- CLEO - Conversations, Learning, Evidence, Opportunities
  - Curated resource library of free online media
- Consumer Involvement in Guideline Development: Why and how to participate
- Series I: Introduction to participation in advisory panels
- Series II: Case studies on consumer engagement on advisory panels
  - Self-tests accompany each video
  - Pocket cards for consumers and panel organizers summarize key points
- Series III: Scenarios exploring the interpersonal dynamics of advisory panel participation
  - Self-tests accompany each video
  - Pocket cards for consumers and panel organizers summarize key points
- Series IV: How to communicate effectively on an advisory panel
  - Pocket cards for consumers and panel organizers summarize key points

CUE also hosts social networking through Facebook groups and Twitter and contributes its views and support to international projects such as AllTrials.

== CUE Partnership Clearinghouse ==
In keeping with its role as a consumer-scientist partnership, CUE maintains a clearinghouse function which matches consumers with healthcare professional organizations so that the consumer voice may be incorporated into important healthcare decisions. Past partnerships have matched consumer representatives into research implementation processes such as clinical guidelines panels, grant-writing, peer review, and conference workshops.

Through the CUE Clearinghouse, health professional organizations can request consumer representatives for their research/research implementation projects and consumers can respond directly to those requests. Since 2007, CUE has fostered over 75 partnerships between consumers and policymaking organizations, including 12 in 2014 alone.

To prepare all stakeholders for a panel with meaningful consumer engagement, CUE has created a series of short videos based on real-life interactions between professionals and patients participating on advisory panels. These videos demonstrate real-life scenarios and situations that professional guideline developers and consumer advocates serving on advisory panels are likely to encounter. They focus on specific steps in the advisory panel process such as preparing for a panel as a consumer, effectively moderating the panel as a chair, and how to ensure that diverse opinions are heard, understood, and respected during advisory panel meetings.

== See also ==
- Decision-making
- Evidence-based medicine
- Policy-based evidence making
