= Talking point (disambiguation) =

Talking point is a brief phrase used by speakers, especially in politics.

Talking point may also refer to:

- Talking Points Memo, a political blog
- Talking Points (The West Wing), an episode of the TH series The West Wing television program
- Talking Points, one of the segments in The O'Reilly Factor
- Talking Point (Australian TV series), an Australian television series
- Talking Point (BBC Arabic), a TV and radio phone-in program broadcast on BBC Arabic Service
- Talking Points, an academic journal published by Literacies and Languages for All, a conference of the National Council of Teachers of English

== See also ==
- Talking points memo (disambiguation)
