= Salwa Jarrah =

Author and BBC Arabic broadcaster

- سلوى جراح
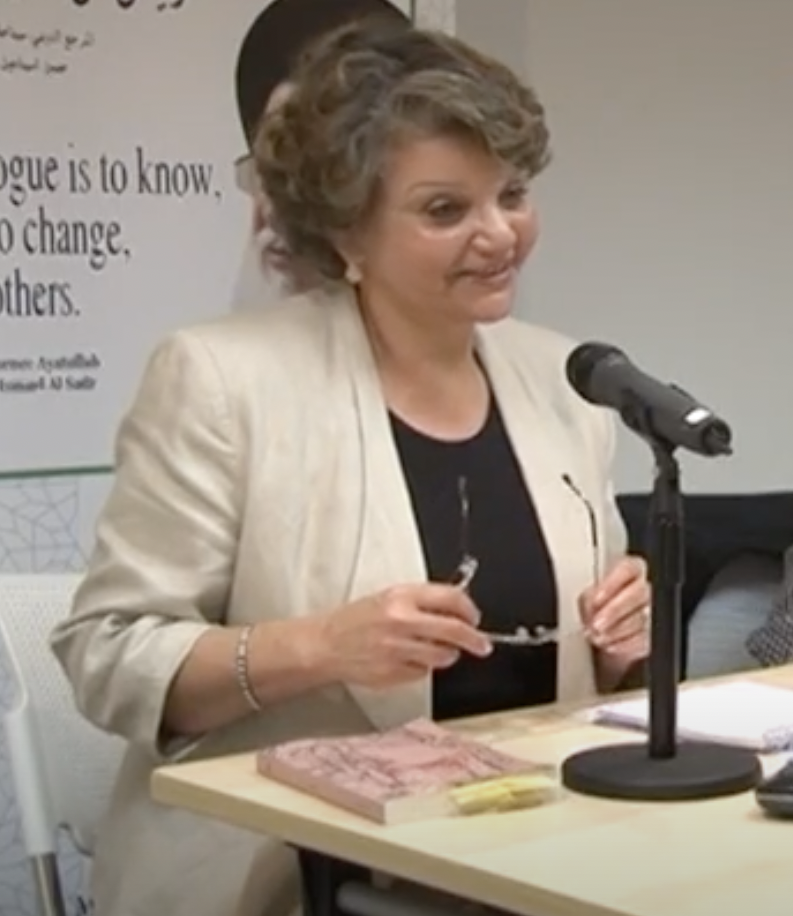
- Jarrah at a book talk in 2012
- Born: Salwa Jarrah; 1946 (age 78–79); Haifa, Mandatory Palestine
- Education: Al-Hikma University, Baghdad (BA)
- Occupations: Broadcaster; producer; author
- Parent: Zanoun Jarrah

Salwa Jarrah (Arabic: سلوى جراح; born 1946) is an author and former BBC Arabic broadcaster. Jarrah was born in Haifa, Mandatory Palestine, to a family from Acre, Mandatory Palestine. She grew up in Basra, Iraq.

== Career ==
Jarrah graduated from Al-Hikma University (Baghdad) with a bachelor's degree in English in 1977. She began working with BBC Arabic as a broadcaster in 1977, where she wrote and presented several programs. Notably, Jarrah a BBC Arabic sex education program funded by the United Nations Fund for Population Activities, which regularly centered around women's issues and was described by the BBC as "the first of its kind to air in Arabic." According to BBC News, the program "provided useful advice with the help of highly qualified experts and doctors" and addressed sexual issues considered to be taboo in the Arab world. Jarrah also hosted the program "Oasis," the BBC Arabic equivalent of the BBC Radio program, Desert Island. She interviewed the Egyptian film director Youssef Chahine, the Syrian diplomat and poet Nizar Qabbani, and the Lebanese singer Sabah as part of the program. As part of the program, "Mosaic," Jarrah interviewed Arab literary figures, including Yahya Haqqi and Naguib Mahfouz, recipient of the 1988 Nobel Prize in Literature.

Jarrah, along with fellow broadcasters Madiha Rashid Al-Madfai and Huda al-Rasheed, is credited as being part of a "trend of feminisation" of BBC Arabic which, during its zenith, "cultivated the loyalty of millions of listeners in the Middle East and North Africa." In 2018, BBC Arabic's 80th anniversary, the BBC hailed Jarrah, Al-Madfai, and Al-Rasheed as "pioneers" in the BBC Arabic Service and women's broadcasting and journalism in the Arab world. That year, Jarrah participated in a BBC program celebrating BBC Arabic's "80 years of broadcasting." In 2023, after 85 years, the BBC ended its BBC Arabic radio service due to budgetary concerns.

Since retiring in 1999, Jarrah has authored several Arabic novels, including "Fifth Season" (2005), "Rocks of the Shore" (2007), "Insomnia" (2009), "Image in Still Water" (2014), "Narrow Doors" (2016), and "When Tales Intertwine" (2020). In 2019, Jarrah published an autobiography, "Scattered Papers", describing her childhood, family life, career, and connection to Acre, the Palestinian city where her family lived before being displaced in 1948. Her niece, Huda Asfour, is an academic and oud musician.
