= Talking points memo =

Talking Points Memo is a political journalism website that began in 2000

Talking points memo may also refer to:

- Talking Points Memo Cafe, a blog portal created as a spin-off blog to Talking Points Memo that began in 2005
- Talking points memorandum, a succinct statement designed to support persuasively one side taken on an issue

== See also ==
- Talking point (disambiguation)
