= Madiha Rashid Al-Madfai =

Jordanian radio broadcaster (died 2019)

- Born: Palestine
- Died: 26 November 2019; London, England, United Kingdom
- Citizenship: Jordan
- Education: The American University in Cairo; University of London
- Occupation: Radio broadcaster
- Years active: 1957–2000
- Employers: Voice of Palestine; BBC Arabic

Madiha Rashid Al-Madfai (Arabic: مديحة رشيد المدفعي) (died 26 November 2019) was a Palestinian radio broadcaster for BBC Arabic. She was the first woman to broadcast news bulletins on BBC Arabic and presented multiple political programmes of a serious nature such as Panorama and Opinion and Other Opinion of which the Arabic public were unfamiliar with. Al-Madfai had also worked for the Voice of Palestine from Cairo and worked on the Jordanian radio industry. She retired from radio broadcasting in 2000.

== Background and education ==
Al-Madfai was a from Jordanian national who was born in Palestine. She was the daughter of the Jordanian government minister Rashid Al-Madfai. She graduated from The American University in Cairo after studying journalism and political science. Al-Madfai completed a Doctor of Philosophy degree in political science at the University of London in the mid-1980s.

== Career ==
Following graduation from The American University in Cairo, she spent a few months working for the Voice of Palestine radio station in Cairo and then went on to join the Jordanian radio scene. Al-Madfai began working for BBC Arabic Radio in 1960, presenting variety programmes before going to read political news bulletins, the latter of which was dominated by men. She was the first female to broadcast BBC Arabic news bulletins, fifteen years before women could do the same job for the English-language international radio station BBC World Service. Al-Madfai was allowed to broadcast on the radio following talks with BBC directors who were conservative with their position of not favouring women to read the news or present political programmes.

Al-Madfai was the first person to broadcast on the radio the news of the crossing of the Suez Canal by the Egyptian Army during the Yom Kippur War in 1973. It came when she was broadcasting the news on air and the English editor provided her with that information on a piece of paper written in English. Al-Madfai presented multiple political programmes with a serious nature of which the Arab public were not familiar with such as the Panorama documentary programme broadcasting a diverse range of topics that became popular with listeners and the Opinion and Other Opinion discussion programme. In 1993, she published the book Jordan, the United States and the Middle East Peace Process, 1974–1991. Seven years later, Al-Madfai retired from the radio industry.

== Personal life ==
She was married to the broadcaster Nadim Nasser. Al-Madfai died in London on 26 November 2019.

== Legacy ==
She was recognizable by the announcement "The news bulletin from the BBC read to you by Madiha Rashid al-Madfai" Al-Madfai helped to establish a precedent for other women in the Arab world to get into radio such as Huda Al-Rasheed, Salwa Jarrah, Hala Salah El-Din, Samia Al-Atrash, Nadia Saleh and Afaf Jalal among others.
