= Svoboda Diaries =

Collection of diaries

The Svoboda Diaries are a collection of diaries kept by two members of the Svoboda family, a Christian family of European descent living in Baghdad during the late 19th and early 20th centuries. Containing over 40 years of daily entries from 1862 to 1908, the diaries of Joseph Mathia Svoboda detail his life as a steamship worker on the Tigris river, his everyday affairs in the Baghdadi community, and perspectives on current events in Ottoman Iraq and the world at large. The collection also contains a travel journal kept by Joseph's son, Alexander Richard Svoboda, while journeying overland from Baghdad to Paris as a teenager in 1897.

Although only small portions of the diaries have been published thus far, the University of Washington's Department of Middle Eastern Studies began the Svoboda Diaries Project in 2006, to publish the diaries in both electronic and print format, making them freely available to the public in partnership with Newbook Digital Texts in the Humanities.

== The Diaries ==
=== Background ===
The Svoboda family's presence in Baghdad began with the immigration of Antone Svoboda (1796-1878), a Viennese crystal merchant, to the Ottoman Empire in the early 19th century. Settling in Baghdad, Antone established a business importing crystal from Bohemia and Istanbul and developed close relations with the European community and the city's local upper class. Antone married Euphemie Joseph Muradijan, a member of the local Chaldean Christian community, in 1825. Antone and Euphemie had eleven children, four of them male and seven female. The Svobodas became an established family in Baghdad, intermixing with and marrying members of the local Christian, resident European and Muslim communities for generations.

=== The Joseph Mathia Svoboda Diaries ===
Entry from Joseph Mathia Svoboda Diaries, noting the death of Baghdad notable Kerop Agha Kouyoumdjian

Among Antone's sons was Joseph Mathia Svoboda (1840-1908). In 1862, Joseph began working as a clerk with the Euphrates and Tigris Steam Navigation Company, traveling by steamship along the Tigris River between Baghdad and Basra. During this time, he began recording a daily diary that he would keep until his death in 1908. The diaries primarily concern his everyday affairs, including meticulous notes on shipments and weather conditions, as well as his personal interactions with his family and the local Christian community in Baghdad. Joseph's diaries provide a unique vantage point for the interplay of the diverse cultures, governments, and forces of nature competing for influence in Ottoman Iraq. Roughly bookended by the start of the Tanzimat era and the Young Turk Revolution, Joseph's life in Baghdad at once reflects the rapid changes taking place in the period of the late Ottoman Empire and the immutable character of the ancient land between rivers. In her original article on the diaries, Margaret Makiya writes that Joseph's life "covers almost exactly the period of 'Victorian Baghdad' if we may use such a term, and the diaries reveal as much about himself and the generation to which he belonged as they do about the great empire and society through which he moved.".

=== The Alexander Richard Svoboda Travel Journal ===
In 1897, at the age of nineteen, Joseph's son Alexander journeyed across the Middle East and Europe, keeping a journal as he went. Traveling from his frontier province of Baghdad to the modern metropolis of Paris, Alexander records his impressions of a rapidly modernizing landscape as he encounters it for the first time, provides a fresh commentary on the great changes of his day and the particularity of Baghdad's place in that world. Written in Arabic, the journal was translated by Nowf Allawi and published in collaboration with Newbook Digital Texts in 2013. In his introduction to the Newbook publication, Professor Walter G. Andrews notes that as a young Baghdadi of European heritage, "Alexander represents a microcosm of the interplay and conflicts of values and traditions that marked the Middle East of his day," giving him a unique perspective for this historical moment at the turn of the 20th century.

== Project History ==
Alexander Svoboda moved from Baghdad to Istanbul in 1929, leaving the diaries with a local Catholic priest. The diaries were eventually passed on to Iraqi historian Yaqub Sarkis, who left his library as a private bequest to Al-Hikma University. In the 1970s, Margaret Makiya became interested in the diaries as "a social document of a particular fragment of Iraqi society in the second half of the nineteenth century," and obtained a grant from the Gulbenkian Foundation to study and transcribe their contents. Makiya transcribed 31 of the 61 diaries, and her work continues to serve as essential source material for the Svoboda Project.

In 1985, Professor Henry Svoboda, the last member of the Svoboda family remaining in Iraq, employed researcher and architect Nowf Allawi to assist in writing a family history using material from Joseph Svoboda's diaries. In 2005 the two began work on a translation of Alexander Svoboda's travel journal, but Professor Svoboda's death in October 2005 and the continuing turmoil of the Iraq War cast doubt on the project's future. Allawi sought the assistance of University of Washington Professor Walter Andrews and the Ottoman Texts Archive Project - a collaboration which began the Svoboda Diaries Project and the development of Newbook Digital Texts in the Humanities. Alexander's travel journal was eventually published by Newbook in 2013, and the Svoboda Project continues the work of transcribing the Joseph Mathia diaries and preparing them for digital release.
