= The Webb Schools =

Private school in Claremont, California, US

Location
- 1175 W Baseline Road; Claremont, California 91711; United States; 34°7′31″N 117°44′22″W

Information
- Type: Private
- Motto: WSC: Principes non Homines ("Leaders, not Ordinary Humans"); VWS: Sapientia Amicitia Atque Honor ("Wisdom, Friendship, and Honor")
- Established: WSC: 1922; VWS: 1981
- Dean: Sarah Lantz
- Head of school: Theresa Smith
- Faculty: 57
- Grades: 9–12
- Average class size: 16
- Campus size: 150 acres (61 ha)
- Colors: Blue and gold
- Athletics: 44 teams in 15 sports
- Athletics conference: San Joaquin League of the California Interscholastic Federation
- Mascot: Gauls
- Accreditations: Western Association of Schools and Colleges
- Website: webb.org

The Webb Schools (often simply Webb) is a private school for grades 9–12 located in Claremont, California. Until 2024, it was separated into the Webb School of California for boys (established in 1922) and the Vivian Webb School for girls (established 1981). It is primarily a boarding school, but also enrolls a limited number of day students.

The school has a campus of approximately 150 acres (610,000 m^{2}) in the foothills of the San Gabriel Mountains. There are 405 students (as of the 2025–2026 school year) and 57 faculty members, of which the school reports that 25% hold doctorates, 90% hold advanced degrees, and 74% live on campus (as of 2018–2019). Annual tuition (as of 2025–2026) is $84,070 for boarding students and $59,790 for day students, including meals, books, and fees. Webb offers over $7 million in need-based aid to 32 percent of the families averaging $60,000 for boarding students and $40,000 for day students.

Until 2024, the majority of ninth- and tenth-grade classes were taught in a single-sex environment. Co-educational courses were introduced to upperclassmen. Since 2024, all classes have become co-educational.

== History ==
The Webb School's founder, Thompson Webb, was born in 1887 as the youngest of eight children. His father, William Robert “Sawney” Webb, had established the Webb School in Tennessee in 1870.

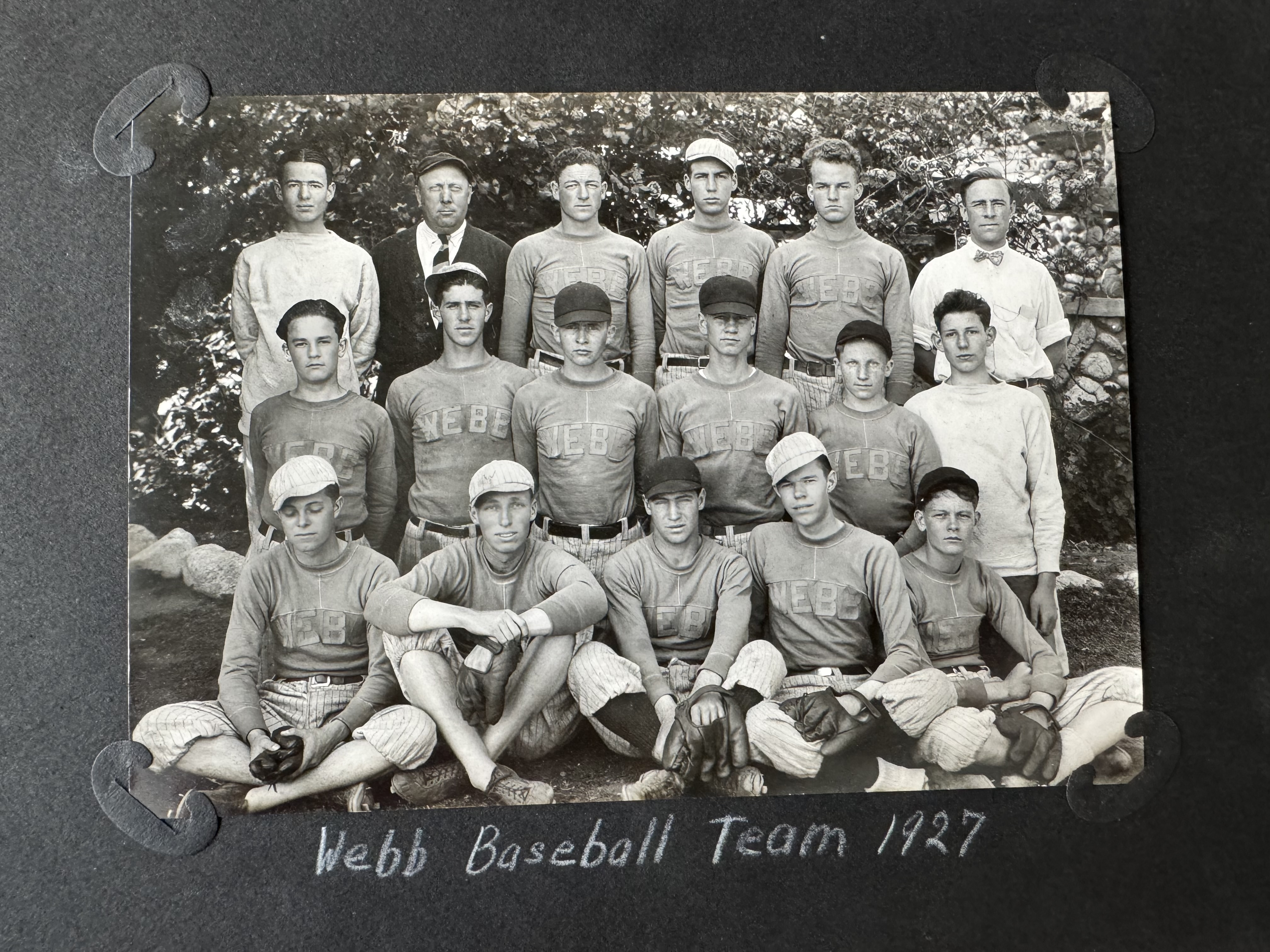
Webb Baseball Team 1927

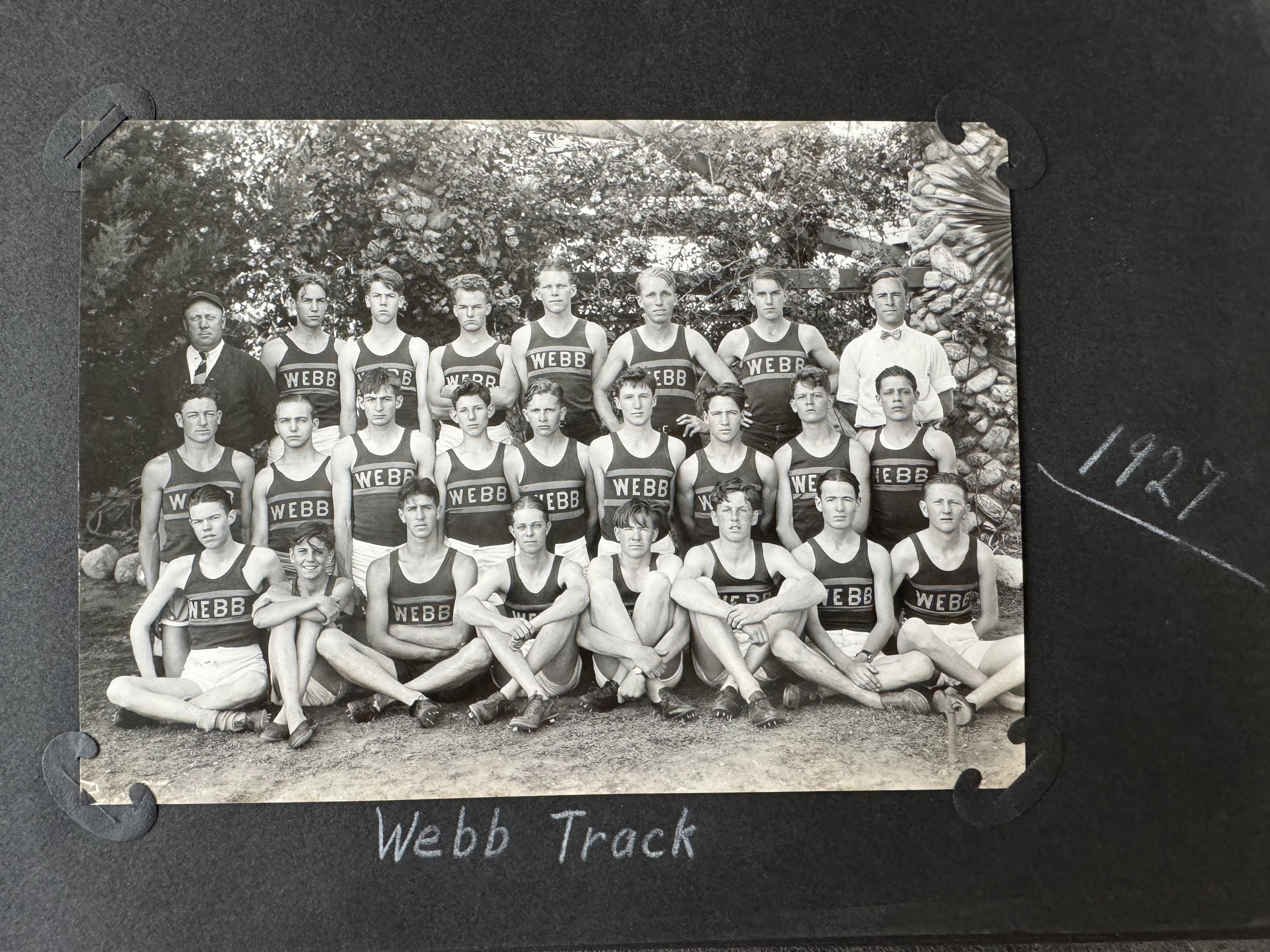
Webb Track Team 1927

The official student newspaper of The Webb Schools is the Webb Canyon Chronicle.

== Campus ==
=== Raymond M. Alf Museum of Paleontology ===
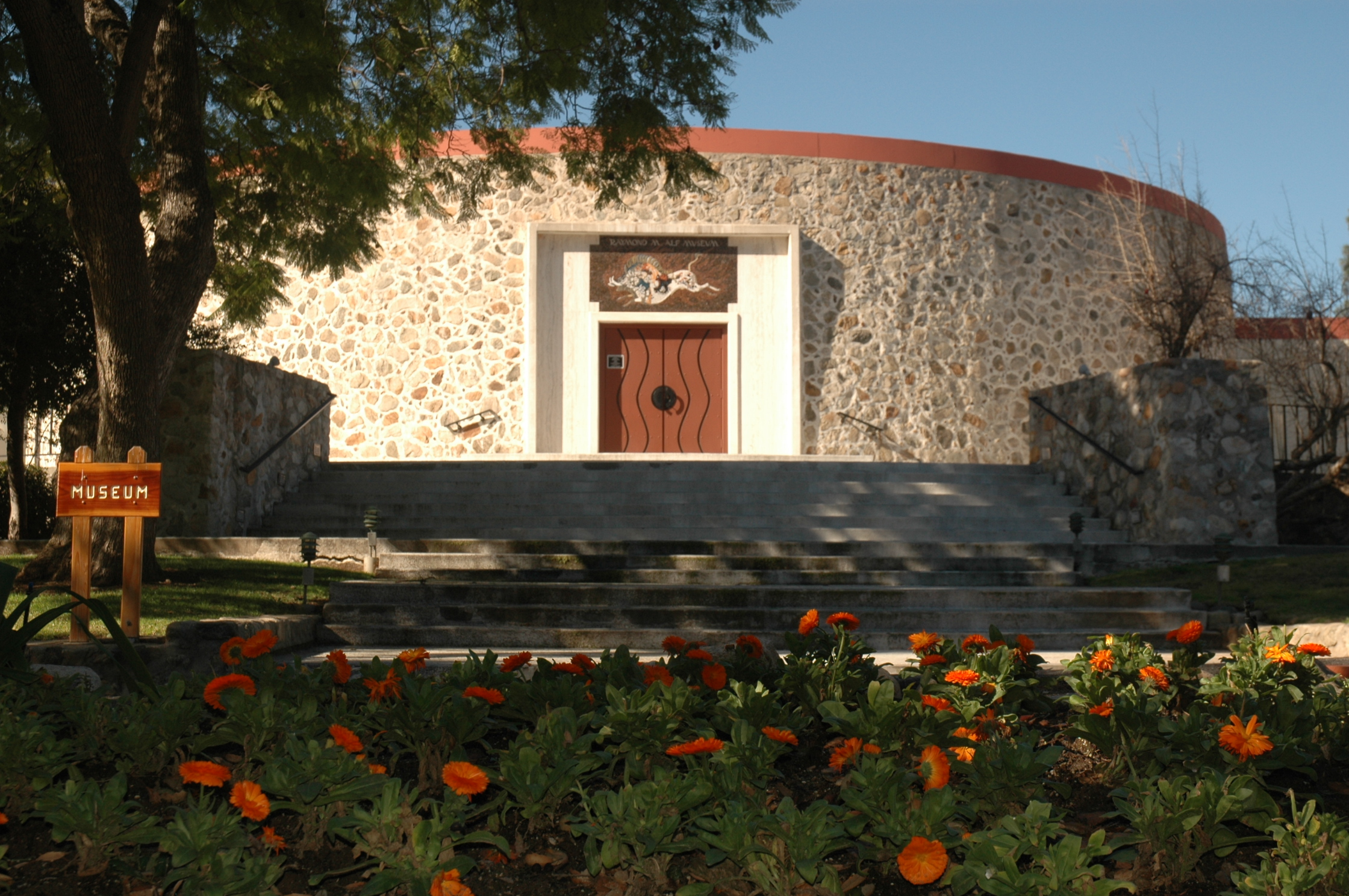
The exterior of the Raymond M. Alf Museum of Paleontology located on The Webb Schools campus, Claremont, CA.

Webb is the only high school in the United States with a nationally accredited museum, and the only high school in the world with a paleontology museum on campus. The Raymond M. Alf Museum of Paleontology is named for long-time Webb science teacher Raymond M. Alf (1905–1999). In the late 1930s, Alf and several students found a fossil skull in the Mojave Desert in the Barstow area. This discovery of a new species of Miocene-age peccary, Dyseohyus fricki, inspired additional fossil-hunting trips in the western United States with student groups.

Alf continued his pursuit of paleontology by earning his master's degree from the University of Colorado. The fossil hunting continued when Alf returned to Webb and he subsequently created a small museum in the basement of Jackson Library to house his collection of thousands of fossils. As the collection eventually outgrew the shelves in Alf's classroom and the library basement, the museum moved to its own campus building in 1968. Today the museum is curated by Mairin Balisi, and is accredited by the American Alliance of Museums. The museum features one of the largest collections of fossil animal footprints in the world. The Alf Museum continues to sponsor paleontology field excursions over the summers and has contributed to the discovery of new species like Gryposaurus monumentensis, in the Grand Staircase–Escalante National Monument in southern Utah. The fossils were removed and identified in collaboration with the University of Utah and the national monument.

=== Vivian Webb Chapel ===
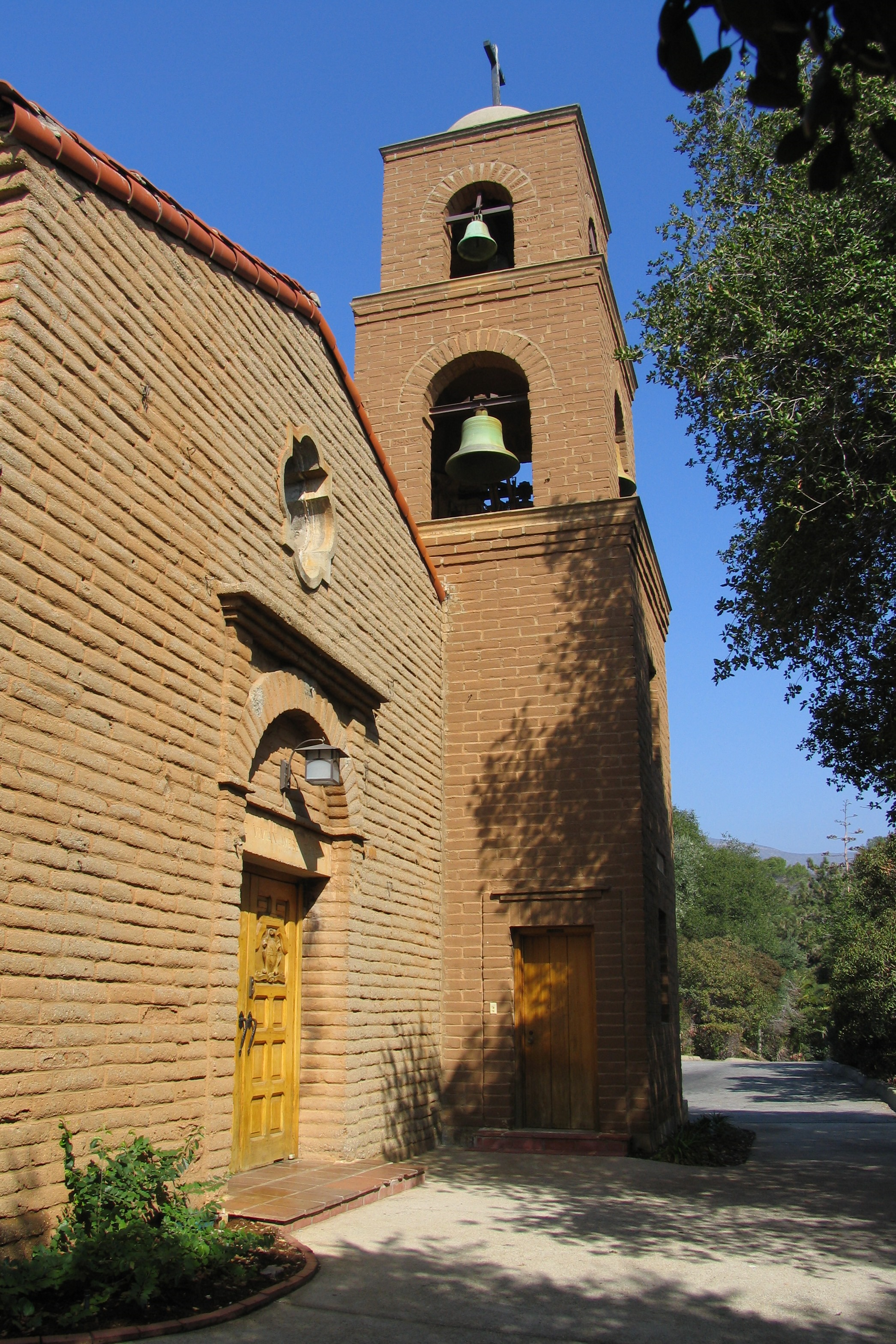
The Vivian Webb Chapel

Fascinated by California missions, Thompson Webb took the mission at San Juan Capistrano as the inspiration for the Vivian Webb Chapel, a monument to both his religious faith and his love for his wife. In 1937, with the help of a small cement mixer and two hired workers, Thompson began making 60-pound (27 kg) adobe bricks. After a year of turning out more than 10,000 mission-style bricks and drying them in the sun on the school's tennis courts, he began building the chapel's foundation in 1938, and laid the chapel's first brick in 1939. He built the walls of the chapel with the help of students, parents, visitors, prospective students and the governor of Tennessee.

Near completion of the structure, Webb learned that sculptor Alec Miller was in the United States because of World War II and lacked the funds to return to his native Scotland. Miller was well known in England because of his carvings for the cathedral at Coventry.

=== Thomas Jackson Library ===
The parents of Thomas Jackson donated the Thomas Jackson Library to the school as a memorial to their son, who graduated from Webb in 1930 but died of a heart attack while in his sophomore year at the California Institute of Technology. The library, dedicated in 1938, was designed by acclaimed architect Myron Hunt, who also built the Rose Bowl, the Pasadena main library, and Thompson and Vivian Webb's campus home. The building, in a Mediterranean style with small balconies on the second floor and a mezzanine balcony around the interior, won an Honor Award from the American Institute of Architects soon after its dedication.

== Notable alumni ==
- Michael Arias, Anime producer
- Robert D. Arnott, founder of Research Affiliates
- Alphonzo E. Bell Jr., member of the U.S. House of Representatives
- Tyler Bensinger, writer and TV producer
- Paul Billings, geneticist
- William E. Boeing Jr., philanthropist
- Art Clokey, creator of Gumby
- John R. Davis Jr., American diplomat
- Leslie Epstein, Rhodes Scholar, novelist, playwright
- Roger Fan, actor
- Brooks Firestone, winemaker and politician, of the Firestone Tires family
- Maame Ewusi-Mensah Frimpong, Judge on the United States District Court for the Central District of California
- Robert Glenn Ketchum, photographer
- Jeff Luhnow, Houston Astros General Manager
- E. Pierce Marshall, businessman
- Josh Marshall, journalist, blogger, and publisher of Talking Points Memo
- Malcolm McKenna, paleontologist, former curator at the American Museum of Natural History
- Seeley Mudd, physician, professor, and philanthropist to academic institutions
- Nils Muiznieks, Latvian human rights activist and political scientist
- Steven Nissen, cardiologist
- Jeffrey Pfeffer, author, lecturer
- Sandra Lee, M.D., dermatologist, known as Dr. Pimple Popper, social media influencer and television star
- David Lee Roth, rock and roll singer
- Jordan Ryan, vice-president for Peace Programs, The Carter Center
- Newton Russell, California State Assemblyman
- David Sanger, Asleep at the Wheel band member
- John Scalzi, science fiction author
- Charles Scripps, chairman of E.W. Scripps Company
- Admiral James Watkins, 22nd Chief of Naval Operations and United States Secretary of Energy
- Nick Wechsler, movie producer (The Time Traveler's Wife, North Country)

== Related schools ==
The original Webb School founded by Thompson Webb's father still operates in Tennessee. A son of Thompson and Vivian Webb, Howell Webb, founded the Foothill Country Day School in Claremont in 1954. A nephew, Robert Webb, started the Webb School of Knoxville in Tennessee in 1955.

== See also ==
- The Webb School (Bell Buckle, Tennessee)
- Webb School of Knoxville
