= Leslie Epstein =

American educator, essayist and novelist (1938–2025)

- Born: Leslie Donald Epstein; May 4, 1938; Los Angeles, California, U.S.
- Died: May 18, 2025 (aged 87); Boston, Massachusetts, U.S.
- Occupations: Educator; essayist; novelist
- Parent: Philip G. Epstein (father)
- Relatives: Julius J. Epstein (uncle); Theo Epstein (son)

Academic background
- Education: Yale University (BA, DFA); Merton College, Oxford (GrDip); University of California, Los Angeles (MA)
- Thesis: The Speech of Dumb Animals: Play in Three Acts (1963)

Academic work
- Discipline: English
- Institutions: Boston University
- Doctoral students: Jhumpa Lahiri

Leslie Donald Epstein (May 4, 1938 – May 18, 2025) was an American educator, essayist and novelist.

== Career ==
Epstein was born on May 4, 1938, to an American Jewish family in Los Angeles and grew up in Hollywood. His father Philip and uncle Julius were both noted screenwriters. Together, they won an Academy Award for the celebrated 1942 film Casablanca.

Epstein attended the Webb School of California, and went to Yale University for his bachelor's in English in 1960 and later returned for an earned Doctor of Fine Arts in playwriting from the Yale School of Drama in 1967. In 1960, he matriculated at Merton College, Oxford on a Rhodes Scholarship; he attained a Diploma in Social Anthropology in 1962. He then returned to the United States and received a master's in theatre arts from the University of California, Los Angeles in 1963. He then earned a doctorate in playwriting from Yale.

Epstein wrote nine novels including King of the Jews (1979), about Chaim Rumkowski, head of the Judenrat of the Łódź Ghetto during World War II; and Pandaemonium (1997). His San Remo Drive: A Novel from Memory (2004) was based on his childhood growing up in Hollywood in the 1940s and 50s.

Epstein's last novels are The Eighth Wonder of the World, published by Other Press in 2006, and Liebestod: Opera Buffa with Lieb Goldkorn, published by W. W. Norton & Co. in February 2012.

Epstein wrote articles for Esquire, The Atlantic, Playboy, Harper's, The Yale Review, The Nation, The New York Times Book Review, The Washington Post and The Boston Globe. Among those articles is his essay, "Returning to Proust's World Stirs Remembrance", for the New York Times series, 'Writers on Writing' (Vol. II). In it, he defined reading Marcel Proust "ala Epstein" as reading Proust each night before bedtime; by confining the session to two pages of five minutes, he created a five-year project to complete all the volumes of A la recherche du temps perdu. His rationale: "It is not a bad idea to keep a nightly appointment with a noble mind; it has the power to purify even the most wasted day." In February 2007, his play King of the Jews (not an adaptation of his earlier novel, but an independent realization of the same theme) was premiered at Boston Playwrights' Theatre to critical acclaim.

Epstein joined the faculty of Boston University in 1978. At the time of his death, he was Professor of English; and Director of the Creative Writing Program at Boston University.

== Personal life and death ==
Epstein had three children: Paul, a high school counselor; Theo, a Major League Baseball executive; and Anya, a screenwriter, who is married to Dan Futterman.

Epstein died from complications of heart surgery in Boston, on May 18, 2025, at the age of 87.

== Works ==
- P.D. Kimerakov, 1975
- The Steinway Quintet: Plus Four, 1976
- The Elder, 1979
- King of the Jews, 1979
- Regina, 1982
- Goldkorn Tales, 1985
- Pinto and Sons, 1990
- Pandaemonium, 1997
- Ice Fire Water, 1999
- San Remo Drive, 2003
- The Eighth Wonder of the World, 2006
- Liebestod, 2012
- Hill of Beans: A Novel of War and Celluloid, 2021
