= Diana Zuckerman =

American health policy analyst (born 1950)

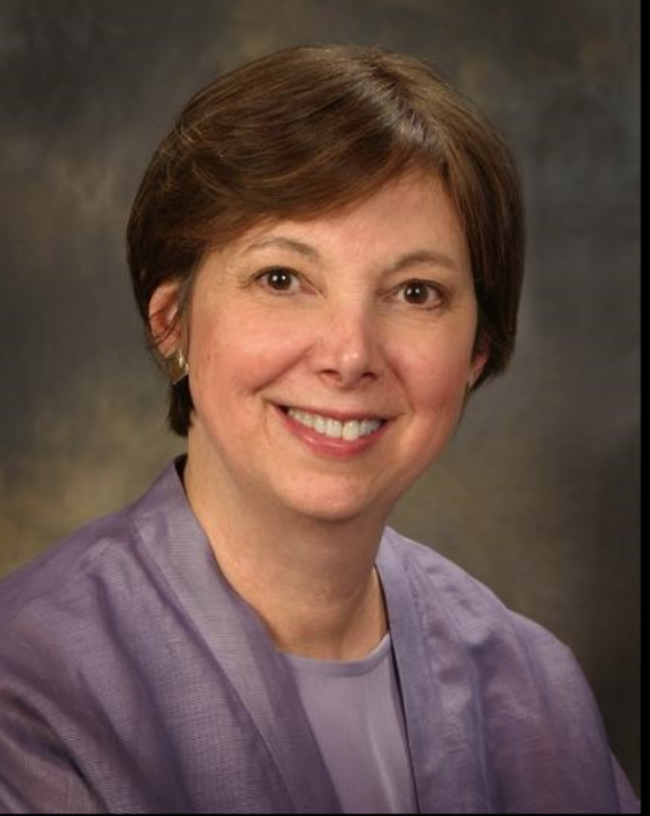
- Born: June 17, 1950 (age 76)
- Education: Smith College (B.A); Ohio State University (Ph.D)

Diana M. Zuckerman (born 16 June 1950) is an American health policy analyst who focuses on the implications of policies for public health and patients' health. She specializes in national health policy, particularly in women's health and the safety and effectiveness of medical products. She is the Founder and President of the National Center for Health Research (formerly National Research Center for Women & Families) and the Cancer Prevention and Treatment Fund.

== Early life and education ==
Zuckerman earned her B.A. in psychology from Smith College and then obtained a Ph.D. in psychology from the Ohio State University in 1977. At Yale Medical School she was a post-doctoral fellow in epidemiology and public health from 1979 to 1980.

== Career ==
She was on the faculty at Vassar College and Yale University, and directed a longitudinal study of college students as director of the Seven College Study at Harvard University, publishing books and articles on the impact of media on children, the impact of religion on the health of the elderly, and how women's life experiences influence their mental and physical health. She left academia to work on health policy issues in 1983 when she was selected as a Fellow in the American Association for the Advancement of Science Congressional Science Fellowship program.

From 1985 to 1993 she worked in the U.S. Congress in a House oversight subcommittee chaired by Rep. Ted Weiss, where she was responsible for a dozen Congressional oversight investigations on health and social policy — including political manipulation of government grants to prevent child abuse, lack of safeguards for infertility treatments, financial conflicts of interest among National Institutes of Health (NIH) grant recipients, and the lack of safety studies on breast implants. Information from the hearings received widespread public health, government, and media attention, resulting in several policy and regulatory changes, including the U.S. Food and Drug Administration (FDA) requiring breast implant manufacturers to submit safety studies for the first time in 1991.

In 1993, Zuckerman joined the staff of the Senate Veterans Affairs Committee and began an investigation that resulted in the first Congressional hearings focused on the possible causes of Gulf War syndrome. This resulted in her working in the White House on Gulf War Syndrome issues in 1995 as a senior policy advisor in the Clinton Administration. From 1996, she held health policy positions at several non-profit organizations, and she became the founding president of the National Center for Health Research in 1999 (which changed its name from National Research Center for Women & Families in 2014). The Center includes the Cancer Prevention and Treatment Fund.

Her work focuses on improving the quality of medical products and healthcare in the United States. She has been highly critical of scientific and medical research paid for by companies, who then use this to promote their products, as well as the lack of media coverage on independently funded research that challenges industry-funded research. She has said:

You've heard of junk science — a term coined by corporations to describe research they don't like — but the real danger to public health might be called "checkbook science": research intended not to expand knowledge or to benefit humanity, but instead to sell products.

In February 2011, Zuckerman and colleagues Paul Brown and Dr. Steven Nissen published a study in the peer-reviewed journal Archives of Internal Medicine, which evaluated the FDA's recalls of devices that the agency considered potentially deadly or otherwise very high risk. Based on FDA data, the authors determined that most of the devices that were high-risk recalls had never been studied in clinical trials prior to FDA approval, and that the FDA needed to use more stringent criteria for implanted medical devices and those used to diagnose serious illnesses, and an editorial in the same issue agreed. In April 2011, Zuckerman presented the results of the study at a hearing by the U.S. Senate Special Committee on Aging.

In 2014, Zuckerman and Brown published another study of medical devices entitled "Lack of Publicly Available Scientific Evidence on the Safety and Effectiveness of Implanted Medical Devices," in JAMA Internal Medicine, which attracted major media coverage because it criticized the FDA for not following its own regulations requiring that information on safety and effectiveness be made available for all implanted devices.

Zuckerman is the author of five books, several book chapters, and dozens of articles in medical and academic journals, and in newspapers across the country. Her policy work has resulted in news coverage on all the major TV networks, including ABC, CBS, NBC, CNN, Fox News, public television, 60 Minutes, 20/20, National Public Radio, and in major U.S. print media such as The New York Times, The Washington Post, The Washington Times, Los Angeles Times, The Boston Globe, USA Today, Detroit Free Press, New York Daily News, Newsweek, Time, U.S. News & World Report, Family Circle, The New Yorker, Glamour, Self, as well as many other newspapers, magazines, and radio programs.

== Published articles ==
In addition to the studies noted above, Zuckerman frequently writes articles in peer-reviewed medical and public health journals regarding medical drugs and devices, as well as public health policy. For example, in 2021, her article describing the shortcuts that the FDA took during the COVID pandemic, entitled "Emergency Use Authorizations (EUAs) Versus FDA Approval: Implications for COVID-19 and Public Health," was published in the American Journal of Public Health.

In 2017-2018 she was the author or co-author of several published peer-review research studies and commentaries questioning the safety and effectiveness of pharmaceuticals and medical devices, such as "Diversity in Medical Device Clinical Trials: Do We Know What Works for Which Patients?", which was published in Milbank Quarterly; "Software-Related Recalls of Health Information Technology and Other Medical Devices: Implications for FDA Regulation of Digital Health" also published in Milbank Quarterly; an editorial entitled "Can the FDA Help Reduce Drug Prices or the Cost of Medical Care?," published in the American Journal of Public Health; "Electronic Health Records," published in Annals of Internal Medicine; "Setting the Record Straight on FDA Approvals in Oncology-Reply," in JAMA Internal Medicine; "Quality of Life, Overall Survival, and Costs of Cancer Drugs Approved Based on Surrogate Endpoints;" also in JAMA Internal Medicine; and a commentary entitled "A Major Shortcoming in the Public Health Legacy of the Obama Administration," published in American Journal of Public Health.

In 2016, Zuckerman co-authored a book chapter entitled "The Challenges of Informed Consent When Information and Time are Limited" in the book Informed Consent: Procedures, Ethics and Best Practices

In 2014-2015 she published several commentaries about a new law that lowered FDA evidence standards, including "21st Century Cures Act and similar policy efforts: at what cost?," which was published in BMJ; "Understanding the Controversies Over a Groundbreaking New Health Care Law," published in Milbank Quarterly; and "Will 20th century patient safeguards be reversed in the 21st century?," also published in BMJ.

Also in 2014 and 2010–2013, Zuckerman was the author or co-author of several published research studies and commentaries, such as, "Lack of diversity in cancer drug clinical trials may exacerbate racial disparities in mortality rates," in Cancer Epidemiology; "Comment on "Silicone wristbands as personal passive samplers," in Environmental Science & Technology; "Regulatory reticence and medical devices," in Milbank Quarterly; "Addressing the need for new antibacterial," in The Lancet Infectious Diseases; "Comment on 'Statement on combined hormonal contraceptives containing third- or fourth-generation progestogens or cyproterone acetate, and the associated risk of thromboembolism," in Journal of Family Planning and Reproductive Health Care; "Hip implant failure for men and women: what and when we need to know Comment on "Sex and Risk of Hip Implant Failure,". in JAMA Internal Medicine; "Public health implications of differences in U.S. and European Union regulatory policies for breast implants," in Reproductive Health Matters; "Adolescents, celebrity worship, and cosmetic surgery," in Journal of Adolescent Health; "and "Reasonably safe? Breast implants and informed consent," in Reproductive Health Matters.
