= Josh Marshall =

American journalist (born 1969)

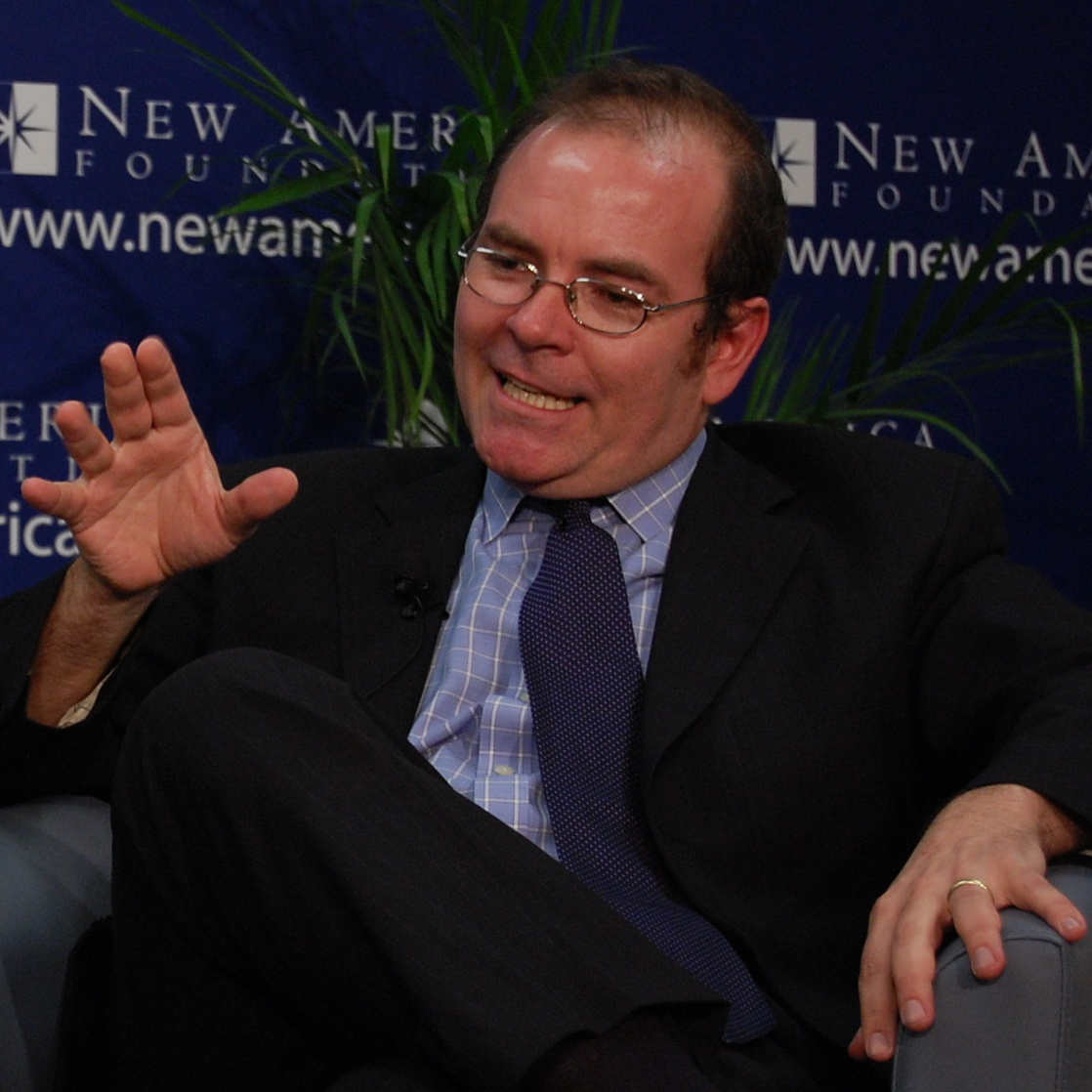
- Marshall in 2010
- Born: February 15, 1969 (age 57); St. Louis, Missouri, U.S.
- Education: Princeton University (BA); Brown University (MA, PhD)
- Occupation: Journalist
- Spouse: Millet Israeli

Joshua Micah Jesajan-Dorja Marshall (born February 15, 1969) is an American journalist and blogger who founded Talking Points Memo. A liberal, he presides over a network of progressive-oriented sites that operate under the TPM Media banner. In 2008, they averaged 400,000 page views on weekdays and 750,000 unique visitors per month.

Marshall and his work have been profiled by The New York Times, the Los Angeles Times, the Financial Times, National Public Radio, The New York Times Magazine, the Columbia Journalism Review, Bill Moyers Journal, and GQ. In 2007, Hendrik Hertzberg, a senior editor at The New Yorker, compared Marshall to the influential founders of Time magazine, saying: "Marshall is in the line of the great light-bulb-over-the-head editors. He's like Briton Hadden or Henry Luce. He's created something new."

== Early life and career ==
Marshall was born in St. Louis, Missouri. Marshall's father was a professor of marine biology. His mother died when he was young.

He is a graduate of the Webb Schools of California and Princeton University and earned a PhD in American history from Brown University. In the mid-1990s, Marshall designed websites for law firms and published an online news site about Internet law, which included interviews with prominent scholars such as Lawrence Lessig.

Marshall began writing freelance articles about Internet free speech for The American Prospect in 1997 and was soon hired as an associate editor. He worked for the Prospect for three years and in 1999 moved to D.C. to become their Washington editor. He often clashed with the top editors at the Prospect, over both ideology and the direction of the website.

== Talking Points Memo ==
=== History ===
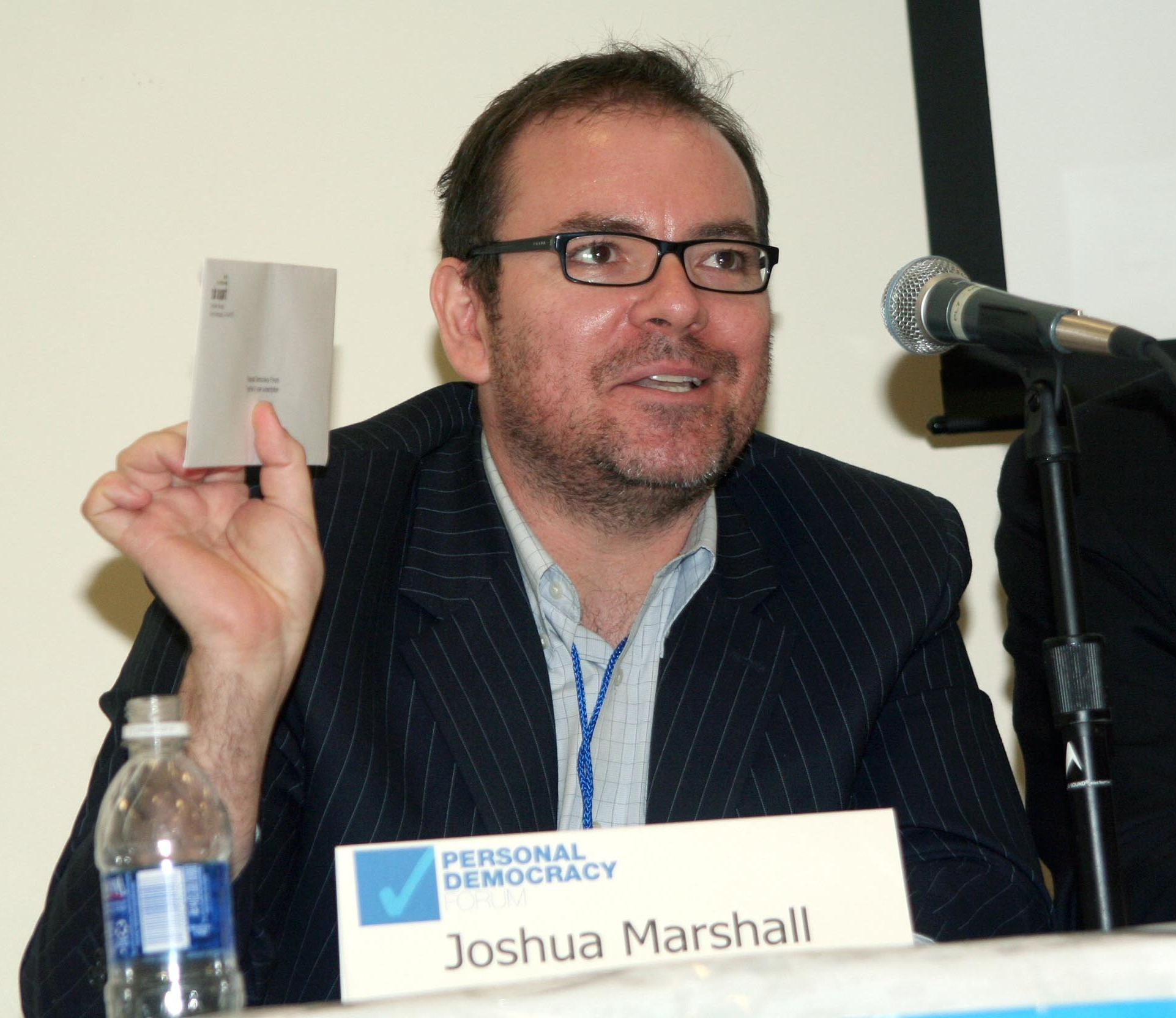
Marshall at the Personal Democracy Forum in May 2007

Inspired by political bloggers such as Mickey Kaus and Andrew Sullivan, Marshall started Talking Points Memo during the 2000 Florida election recount. "I really liked what seemed to me to be the freedom of expression of this genre of writing," Marshall told the Columbia Journalism Review. "And, obviously, given the issues that I had with the Prospect, that appealed to me a lot."

He left his job at the Prospect early in 2001 and continued to blog while writing for The Washington Monthly, The Atlantic, The New Yorker, Salon.com, and the New York Post. In 2002, Marshall used Talking Points Memo to report on Trent Lott's controversial comments praising Strom Thurmond's 1948 presidential run as a segregationist. According to Harvard Kennedy School, Marshall was instrumental in fueling the ensuing scandal that eventually led to Trent Lott's resignation as Senate Minority Leader.

As a result of the Lott story, traffic to Talking Points Memo spiked from 8,000 to 20,000 page views a day. In the fall of 2003, as people focused on the failure to find WMD's in Iraq, there was a new surge of traffic to the site; "I remember there being peak days of 60,000-page views, which was really incredible." Marshall started selling ads on his site and by the end of 2004 was earning $10,000 a month, making him one of a handful of what The New York Times Magazine dubbed "elite bloggers" who earned enough money to make blogging a full-time occupation.

During the 2008 US election campaign, many independent news sites and political blogs saw a wave of "explosive growth". Talking Points Memo experienced the largest surge in traffic, growing from 32,000 unique visitors in September 2007 to 458,000 unique visitors in September 2008, a 1,321% year-to-year increase in the size of its audience.

=== Launching TPM Media ===
In 2005, Marshall launched TPMCafe. This site features a collection of blogs about a wide range of domestic and foreign policy issues written by academics, journalists and former public officials among others.

Marshall expanded his operation again in 2006, launching TPMmuckraker. The site focuses on political corruption, and was originally staffed by Paul Kiel and Justin Rood. Rood has since moved on to ABC and its blog The Blotter. Kiel has recently been joined by two new staff reporter-bloggers, Laura McGann and Spencer Ackerman. TPMmuckraker has attempted to organize its readers to plow through and read document dumps by governmental entities engaging in cover-ups.

TPM Media operates out of an office in Manhattan and currently employs seven reporters, including two in Washington.

=== U.S. attorney controversy ===
2006 dismissal of U.S. attorneys controversy
- Timeline
- Summary of attorneys
- Congressional hearings
- List of dismissed attorneys
- All related articles

In 2007, Marshall was instrumental in exposing another national controversy — the politically motivated dismissal of U.S. attorneys by the Bush administration. Marshall won The Polk Award for Legal Reporting for his coverage of the story, which "led the news media" and "connected the dots and found a pattern of federal prosecutors being forced from office for failing to do the Bush Administration's bidding." Columbia Journalism Review also credited Marshall's news organization for being "almost single-handedly responsible for bringing the story of the fired U.S. Attorneys to a boil." The ensuing scandal resulted in the resignations of several high-level government officials; the Polk award in particular honored Marshall for his "tenacious investigative reporting" which "sparked interest by the traditional news media and led to the resignation of Attorney General Alberto Gonzales."

After a weekend writer noticed that the U.S. attorney for the Eastern District of Arkansas was being replaced with a former adviser to Karl Rove, Marshall discovered that U.S. Attorney Carol Lam was also being asked to resign. Lam had successfully prosecuted Republican California Representative Duke Cunningham on bribery charges and was amid a criminal investigation into a congressional scandal of historic proportions. "I was stunned by it," Marshall told the Financial Times. "Normally, in a case like that, the prosecutor would be untouchable."

National newspapers were slow to pick up the story. Time magazine's Washington bureau chief Jay Carney accused Marshall of "seeing broad partisan conspiracies where none likely exist." By the time The New York Times first reported on Lam's firing (on page 17), Marshall and his news sites had already posted 15 articles on the story.

Two months after posting his accusatory article, Carney apologized to Marshall. "Josh Marshall at TalkingPointsMemo and everyone else out there whose instincts told them there was something deeply wrong and even sinister about the firings...deserve tremendous credit." Carney went on to write, "I was wrong. Very nice work, and thanks for holding my feet to the fire."

For doggedly pursuing the story, Arianna Huffington nominated Joshua Marshall and the Talking Points Memo team to the Time 100.

== Personal life ==
Marshall married Millet Israeli in March 2005, and the couple live in New York City with their sons Sam and Daniel.

== Prizes and honors ==
- George Polk Award for Legal Reporting, 2007
- The Week Opinion Awards, Blogger of the Year, 2003 & 2007
- GQ Men of the Year, Muckraker, 2007
