= The Cancer Prevention and Treatment Fund =

Cancer Prevention

- Formation: 1999
- Type: nonprofit organization
- Location: Washington D.C.
- Key people: Diana Zuckerman (President)

The Cancer Prevention and Treatment Fund is a Washington D.C.-based nonprofit program that is part of the National Center for Health Research (formerly National Research Center for Women & Families), founded in 1999. The president is Diana Zuckerman.

The Cancer Prevention and Treatment Fund analyzes published research, explains contradictory research findings, and helps health professionals, patients, and consumers understand the implications by explaining the findings in reports, published articles, and on its website. The Fund's online cancer hotline answers questions sent by individuals. In addition, the Fund develops and distributes free booklets for people with cancer, and provides training, continuing education, and information to health care professionals diagnosing and treating cancer. In partnership with the U.S. Department of Health and Human Services, the National Institutes of Health, the National Cancer Institute, and the Agency for Health Research and Quality, the Cancer Prevention and Treatment Fund/NRC produced Surgery Choices for Women with Early Stage Breast Cancer and a Spanish language version, Las primeras etapas del cancer de seno. With a grant from the DC Cancer Consortium and the Washington, D.C. Department of Health, the Fund produced a patient booklet (DCIS: What you need to Know) for women diagnosed with ductal carcinoma in situ (DCIS). The Fund developed an online Medscape Continuing Medical Education (CME) course for medical professionals on breast cancer treatment options.

The Cancer Prevention and Treatment Fund is a 510(c)(3) organization that has been recognized as one of America's Best Charities by Independent Charities of America. It is a member of CancerCure of America and is an officially recognized national charity of the Combined Federal Campaign.

== See also ==
- Cancer prevention
