= Paul Billings =

American geneticist

Paul R. Billings, MD, Ph.D., FACP, FACMGG
- Citizenship: American
- Education: 1970-1972: U.C. Santa Cruz 1972-1974: A.B. at U.C. San Diego (summa cum laude) 1974-1979: M.D. at Harvard Medical School 1976-1979: Ph.D. Immunology, Harvard University Graduate School of Arts and Sciences (Baruj Benacerraf, MD Thesis Supervisor)
- Occupations: CEO and Director of Biological Dynamics, Inc., Co-Founder and Chairman of Plumcare LLC, Chairman of Synergenz Bioscience Limited, Co-Founder and Senior Medical Advisor of FabricGenomics, Inc., and Director of DecisionQ Inc., ProterixBio, and PAX Neuroscience Inc.
- Known for: Interest in genomic diagnostics for medical care and coining the term “individualized” genomic medicine.
- Awards: Harvard Medical School's James Tolbert Shipley Prize for best-published research in 1979. Received research grants and awards for his work from various organizations.

Dr. Paul R. Billings is a distinguished American doctor, lecturer, researcher, professor, and consultant on genetic information. His research interests include the impact of genomic data on society, the integration of genomics with diagnostics in health and medical care, and individualised genomic medicine. He is the author of over 250 publications and has appeared on talk shows such as The Oprah Winfrey Show and 60 Minutes. He is currently the CEO and Director of Biological Dynamics.

== Biography ==
Dr. Billings is a board-certified internist and clinical geneticist known for his extensive expertise in genomics and molecular medicine that spans more than 40 years. Dr. Billings has helped many notable organisations, including roles with the Scientific Advisory Board of the Food and Drug Administration (FDA) and the Genomic Medicine Advisory Committee at the Department of Veterans Affairs. He also served as a member of the United States Department of Health and Human Services’ secretary's advisory committee on genetics, health, and society. He was formerly a director of the Personalised Medicine Coalition and a member of the IOM Genomics Roundtable, helping to make an impact on healthcare for broad populations.

Dr. Billings is the CEO and Director at Biological Dynamics, a company dedicated to improving global health outcomes by identifying early-stage disease through its proprietary exosome diagnostic technology. Its ExoVerita platform offers a simple and automated workflow to capture and analyse exosomes, powering advanced detection tests for myriad complex diseases. This technology utilises the ExoVerita platform to enable reliable surveillance and early cancer detection to increase the chance of survival for patients.

Prior to his CEO role at Biological Dynamics, Dr. Billings was the Chief Medical Officer at Natera, Inc., a leader in cell-free DNA testing. Prior to that, he completed an Executive-in-Residence programme at the California Innovation Centre of Johnson & Johnson, was a consultant for Quest Diagnostics Inc., and served as the medical director of the IMPACT Cancer Care Programme at Thermo Fisher Scientific (TFS). Dr. Billings also held key roles at MissionBio, Life Technologies Inc. (LIFE), and the Genomic Medicine Institute, located at El Camino Hospital, the largest community hospital in Silicon Valley.

Dr. Billings founded and led a number of companies focused on genetic and diagnostic medicine throughout his career, including Omica/FabricGenomics, GeneSage Inc., and Cellective Dx Corporation. He has held academic appointments at prestigious institutions, including Harvard University, the University of California, San Francisco, Stanford University, and the University of California, Berkeley. Notably, his work on genetic discrimination played a crucial role in creating and passing the federal Genetic Information Non-Discrimination Act of 2008. From 2003 to 2007, he was senior vice president for corporate development at Laboratory Corporation of America Holdings (NYSE: LH).

He served as a director of Ancestry.com (NASDAQ: ACOM) before their recent transactions, executive chairman of Signature Genomics Laboratories, LLC, and founder of the Cord Blood Registry, Inc. Previously, he served as a board director of TrovaGene, Inc., and CollabRX, Inc., both publicly traded personalised medicine companies in the United States. He also acts as the chief medical officer of Fabric, Inc. Additionally, Dr. Billings has held positions on various other for-profit and not-for-profit boards, including the Council for Responsible Genetics, Cancer Commons, and the Ronald McDonald House Charities (Bay Area).

== Background ==
Dr. Paul R. Billings has a diverse educational background, beginning at the Webb School of California in the 1960s. He pursued his undergraduate studies at the University of California, Santa Cruz, in 1970 before transferring to the University of California, San Diego, in 1972. While at UCSD, Dr. Billings had the opportunity to work as a student fellow at the Salk Institute of Biological Sciences under the guidance of adviser Dr. Martin Kagnoff. In 1973, he served as a student summer fellow at the American Gastroenterology Association, advised by Dr. Morton Grossman.

In 1974, Dr. Billings graduated summa cum laude from UC San Diego with an Artium Baccalaureatus (AB) Degree in History. He then continued his education at Harvard University, where he pursued medicine and immunology as a recipient of the Medical Scientist Training Grant Fellowship from the National Institutes of Health (NIH) and Harvard University. His research at Harvard earned him the James Tolbert Shipley Prize for best-published research in 1979. That same year, Dr. Billings obtained a Ph.D. in immunology and an M.D. degree.

During his time at Harvard, his Ph.D. supervisor was Baruj Benacerraf, who won a Nobel Prize the following year in 1980.

Following medical school, Dr. Billings began his residency at University of Washington-affiliated hospitals, which he completed in 1982. He then continued as a fellow in medical genetics under the guidance of Dr. Arno Motulsky until 1984. In subsequent years, Dr. Billings held teaching and tutoring positions at renowned institutions such as the University of California, Berkeley, Harvard University, the University of California, San Francisco, and Stanford University.

Dr. Billings’s research focuses on the intersection of ethics and medicine. He explores the societal impact of genetic information and biotechnology, the integration of genomics into healthcare, post-genomic health and identity, molecular biology, immunogenetics, their relationship to cellular differentiation, their application in cancer care, and human stem cell research in clinical medicine. Various organisations have funded his groundbreaking work, including the National Institutes of Health, the Robert Wood Johnson Foundation, and the Council for Responsible Genetics.

== Government positions ==
Following is a partial list of Billings' government positions:

- Board Member of the Scientific Advisory Board of the Food and Drug Administration
- Board Member of the Genomic Medicine Advisory Committee at the Department of Veterans Affairs
- Board Member, HHS Advisory Committee, Genetics, Health and Society Office of Technology Assessment, United States Congress
- Contractor 1989 ("Genetic Testing in the Workplace")
- National Institutes of Health (NIH):
  - Special Study Section 1989 ("The Human Genome Initiative")
  - Member of Study Section on Cystic Fibrosis Screening for NIH Genome Center 1991
  - Member of the Special Insurance Task Force on Insurance and Genetics 1991-1993 (NIH/DOE)
  - Chair of NIH Special Task Force on Insurance and Genetic Information's Subcommittee on "Genetic Discrimination" 1991-1993
  - Consultant for NIH/Food and Drug Administration Recombinant DNA Advisory Committee 1999

== Television appearances ==
- 60 Minutes – Season 28 Episode 32: Segment "Do You Really Want to Know?" (April 21, 1996)
- Barbara Walters Special: Segment “A Perfect Baby", July 1990
- "GM Foods May be Harmful " Associated Press, October 1999
- The Oprah Winfrey Show
- Today

== Selected publications ==
=== Books ===
- Billings P (ed). DNA on Trial: Genetic Identification and Criminal Justice. Cold Spring Harbor Pubs, 1992.

== See also ==
- Genetic privacy
- Life Technologies
