= George Polk Awards =

American journalism awards

George Polk Awards in Journalism
- Awarded for: To honor excellence in print and broadcast journalism
- Country: United States
- Presented by: Long Island University
- First award: 1949
- Website: www.liu.edu/polk/

The George Polk Awards in Journalism are a series of American journalism awards presented annually by Long Island University in New York in the United States. A writer for Idea Lab, a group blog hosted on the website of PBS, described the award as "one of only a couple of journalism prizes that means anything". The award is described as follows:

For 75 years, LIU has been the proud home of the George Polk Awards in Journalism, the first major award of its kind to recognize reporting across all media. This prestigious honor focuses on the intrepid, bold, and influential work of the reporters themselves, placing a premium on investigative work that is original, resourceful, and thought-provoking.

== History ==
=== 20th century ===
The awards were established in 1949, in memory of George Polk, a CBS News correspondent who was murdered in March 1948 while covering the Greek Civil War.

=== 21st century ===
In 2008, Josh Marshall's blog, Talking Points Memo, was the first blog to receive the Polk Award in recognition of its reporting on the 2006 U.S. attorneys dismissal scandal.

In 2009, John Darnton, a former editor with The New York Times, was named curator of the George Polk Awards.

In 2024, The New York Times was awarded three Polk Awards for the newspaper's "unsurpassed coverage of the war between Israel and Hamas". Steven Thrasher criticized the issuance of the awards to The New York Times, saying that the newspaper's article, "Screams Without Words", had been discredited.

== Award categories ==
- Foreign reporting
- Radio reporting
- Photojournalism
- Economics reporting
- Business reporting
- Labor reporting
- Legal reporting
- National reporting
- Internet reporting
- Magazine reporting
- Military reporting
- State reporting
- Education reporting
- Local reporting
- Television reporting
- Documentary Film (introduced in 2014)

In addition, the George Polk Career Award is given in recognition of an individual's lifelong achievements.
