= Raymond M. Alf Museum of Paleontology =

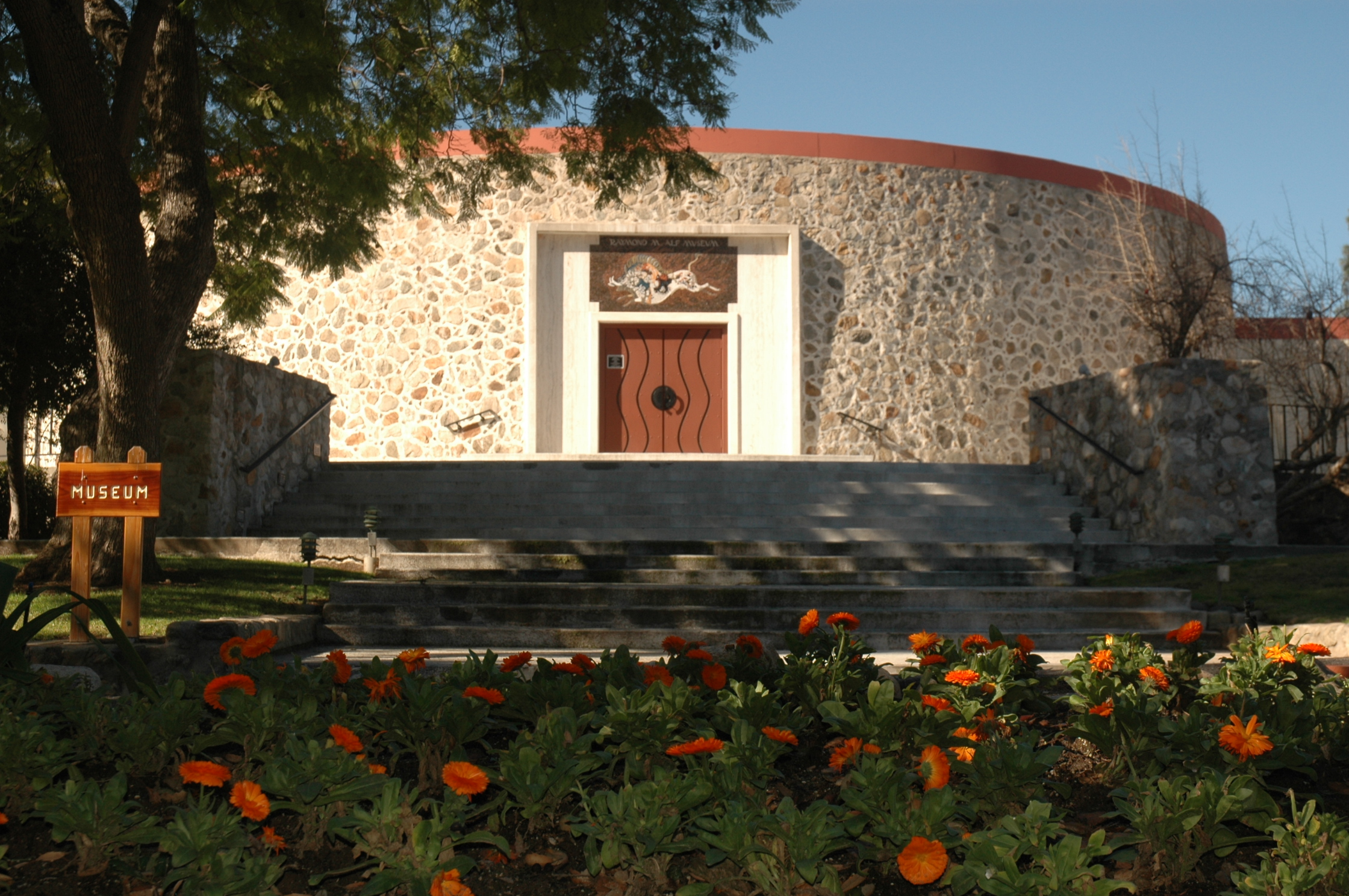
- Established: 1968
- Location: Claremont, California
- Coordinates: 34.123545°N 117.738898°W
- Type: Natural history museum
- Directors: Andrew Farke, PhD
- Curators: Mairin Balisi, PhD
- Website: alfmuseum.org

The Raymond M. Alf Museum of Paleontology is a paleontology museum in Claremont, California, that is part of The Webb Schools. It is the only nationally accredited museum on a secondary school campus in the United States. The museum has two circular 4,000 sq. ft. exhibition halls and 20,000 unique annual visitors. The collections number about 140,000 specimens, 95% of which were found by Webb students on fossil-collecting trips called “Peccary Trips,” expeditions usually centered in California, Utah, and Montana. The collections consist primarily of vertebrate, invertebrate, and track fossils and the museum's large track collection is recognized as one of the most diverse in the world.

The museum has six full-time staff, two of whom are research paleontologists who conduct research with Webb students in a specialized curriculum through The Webb Schools' Science Department.

== History ==
In 1929, nationally acclaimed sprinter Raymond Alf arrived in Los Angeles to run for the L.A. Track Club. After the track season ended, Alf found a job teaching science at the Webb School of California, a boarding school on the outskirts of Los Angeles. Alf's paleontology career unofficially began in 1935, when he spotted a fossil horse jaw at a photo shop and learned that it was found near Barstow. Intrigued, Alf gathered Webb students and went in search of fossils in the Barstow desert. On the first trip, Bill Webb, son of the Webb School's founder Thompson Webb, found a fossil skull. Alf and Bill Webb took the specimen to Chester Stock, a paleontologist from the California Institute of Technology, who identified it as a new species of Miocene-age peccary. The species was called Dyseohys fricki. Inspired by the discovery of D. fricki, Alf began the museum tradition of leading summer and weekend paleontology expeditions (known as Peccary Trips) for Webb students to fossil-rich areas in the western United States.

On the first Summer Peccary trip in Nebraska in 1937, Alf met Professor John Clark from the University of Colorado who encouraged Alf to become a paleontologist. Alf took a sabbatical and completed his Master's degree in geology at the University of Colorado in one academic year. When he returned to Webb, Alf added paleontology into his biology curriculum and established a small museum in the basement of the school's library. Alf later led hundreds of peccary trips throughout the 1950s and 1960s, with the student paleontology program becoming a school tradition.

A number of Webb students became distinguished paleontologists, including: Malcolm McKenna (Class of 1948, Columbia University/ Frick Curator of Vertebrate Paleontology at the American Museum of Natural History); Dwight Taylor (Class of 1949, one of the world's foremost malacologists, specializing in gastropods); David Webb (Class of 1953, retired Curator of Paleontology at the Florida Museum of Natural History); and Daniel Fisher (Class of 1967, currently a curator at the Museum of Paleontology at the University of Michigan).

By the mid-1960s, a larger space was needed to house the collections created by Alf and his students. In 1968, a new two-story circular facility was built and named in honor of Alf. This facility, originally known as the Raymond M. Alf Museum, is still in use today. The museum is now named the Raymond M. Alf Museum of Paleontology in accordance with its mission focused solely on paleontology.

In the early 1990s, under the third director Don Lofgren, the museum launched a major effort to bring its programs and operations up to national professional standards. It completed this process in 1998 and earned national accreditation from the American Association of Museums.

== Exhibits ==
=== Hall of Life ===
The Hall of Life, renovated in 2011, is located on the museum's upper floor and provides an overview of the history of life on earth. Modeled after a time spiral, the hall illustrates the evolution of beings, from the first record of life through human civilization. On display are ancient single-celled and multicellular organisms, as well as fossilized invertebrates, including a cast of the world's largest trilobite. Dinosaurs are represented by casts of skulls (Diabloceratops, Gryposaurus, Nanotyrannus, Pachycephalosaurus, Tyrannosaurus rex), and skeletons of Allosaurus and Centrosaurus, among others. A large collection of fossil mammals from North America, including saber toothed cats, brontotheres, and three-toed horses is also featured. The exhibit ends with a series of temporary displays which show the results of recently completed research projects of museum staff and Webb students. Currently on temporary display is “Baby Joe”, a young Parasaurolophus discovered in 2009 by students in the Kaiparowits Formation in southern Utah.

=== Hall of Footprints ===
The Hall of Footprints is the largest section with a diversity of fossil footprints collections that are on display in the United States of America. The display has a variety of collections such as track-ways and tracks that are made dinosaurs, camels, spiders and elephants. There are more skeletons of camel, giant bear-dog, whose skeletons are all complete. These skeletons are mounted on top of it track-way for fossil.

== Research activities ==
=== Student research ===
The Raymond Alf Museum of Paleontology acts as a unique resource for students of The Webb Schools as they have the opportunity to function as paleontologists through hands-on field, lab, and class-based activities. In addition to collecting important fossils on peccary trips, Webb students are involved in all steps of the scientific process including removal from encasing rock and eventual study in the museum's capstone science course, Honors Advanced Museum Research. Students have access to a fully equipped and modern research lab, do original research on the fossils they find with museum staff, and publish their results in peer reviewed scientific journals. Webb students attend regional and international paleontology conferences to present their research and interact with scientists from all over the world.

==== Peccary trips ====
Since the late 1930s, fossil collecting trips for Webb students have been known as Peccary Trips. During the academic year, most Peccary Trips are centered on Southern California locales, like the Barstow and Goler formations in the Mojave Desert. On these trips, students learn collection techniques such as prospecting, quarrying, and screen-washing.

Every year since 1937, the museum has offered a Summer Peccary Trip for Webb students, co-led by Museum Director Dr. Don Lofgren and Augustyn Family Curator of Paleontology Dr. Andrew Farke. This expedition leads students to collect fossils in remote areas of Utah and Montana. Presently, the museum summer field research is centered on projects in the Kaiparowits Formation of southern Utah and the Renova Formation of southwest Montana.

==== Paleontology classes ====
As part of the freshman science curriculum, Webb students learn the basics of the geological time, evolution, and other processes that shape the planet. In advanced paleontology electives, Honors Advanced Study in Paleontology and Honors Museum Research, students acquire the scientific background necessary to work with fossils, as they learn how museums procure, curate, exhibit, and identify fossils. They are also given research projects, which involve the review of relevant scientific literature, as well as analysis and interpretation of paleontological data.

In the Honors Advanced Museum Research course (for juniors and seniors), students work on a supervised research project. Student research projects result in significant contributions to knowledge and are usually published in regional or internationals scientific journals. Between 2008 and 2011, Webb students were primary or secondary authors in more than 10 peer-reviewed scientific articles. As of 2023, Webb students had co-authored more than 50 published papers.

=== Peccary Society ===
The Peccary Society is the exploration and research arm of the museum and includes alumni of The Webb Schools, current students, and museum friends and supporters. The Peccary Society was named in honor of the peccary skull found by Bill Webb in 1936. Students who accompanied Alf on peccary trips were the earliest members of the Peccary Society. Current Webb students still accompany museum staff on peccary trips and are vested as members of the Peccary Society. For members of the Peccary Society, the museum offers international peccary trips to Mongolia, China, and Madagascar and also hosts the annual Peccary Society Dinner at which alumni and friends gather to celebrate the museum's continued success.

=== Collections ===
The Raymond Alf Museum of Paleontology acts as a center for paleontological education and research by maintaining and expanding its collection of over 140,000 specimens. The museum is home to eighteen holotypes, most notably the hadrosaur Gryposaurus monumentensis, the ancient horse Megahippus mckennai, and the ancient ungulate Goleroconus alfi. Notable ichnotypes include the arachnid Octopodichnus raymondi and the bear-dog Hirpexipes alfi.

== Educational outreach ==
The museum offers tours of its exhibits to school groups. Special hands-on learning activities are offered to the public on Family Science Discovery Days, which occur on the second Saturday of each month. Each family day features a different topic with learning stations and related crafts. Past themes have included "Ancient Sea Life", "Mighty Dinosaurs", and "The Ice Age". The museum also hosts an annual "Fossil Fest", an event that celebrates the excitement of paleontology through hands-on learning for visitors of all ages. The "Fossil Fest" includes behind-the-scenes tours of the museum's laboratory, crafts for children, and talks by staff paleontologists which highlight recent museum research projects. The museum allows teachers from local schools to borrow “classroom fossil kits” that include fossils and fossil replicas for their classroom use.

== Gallery ==
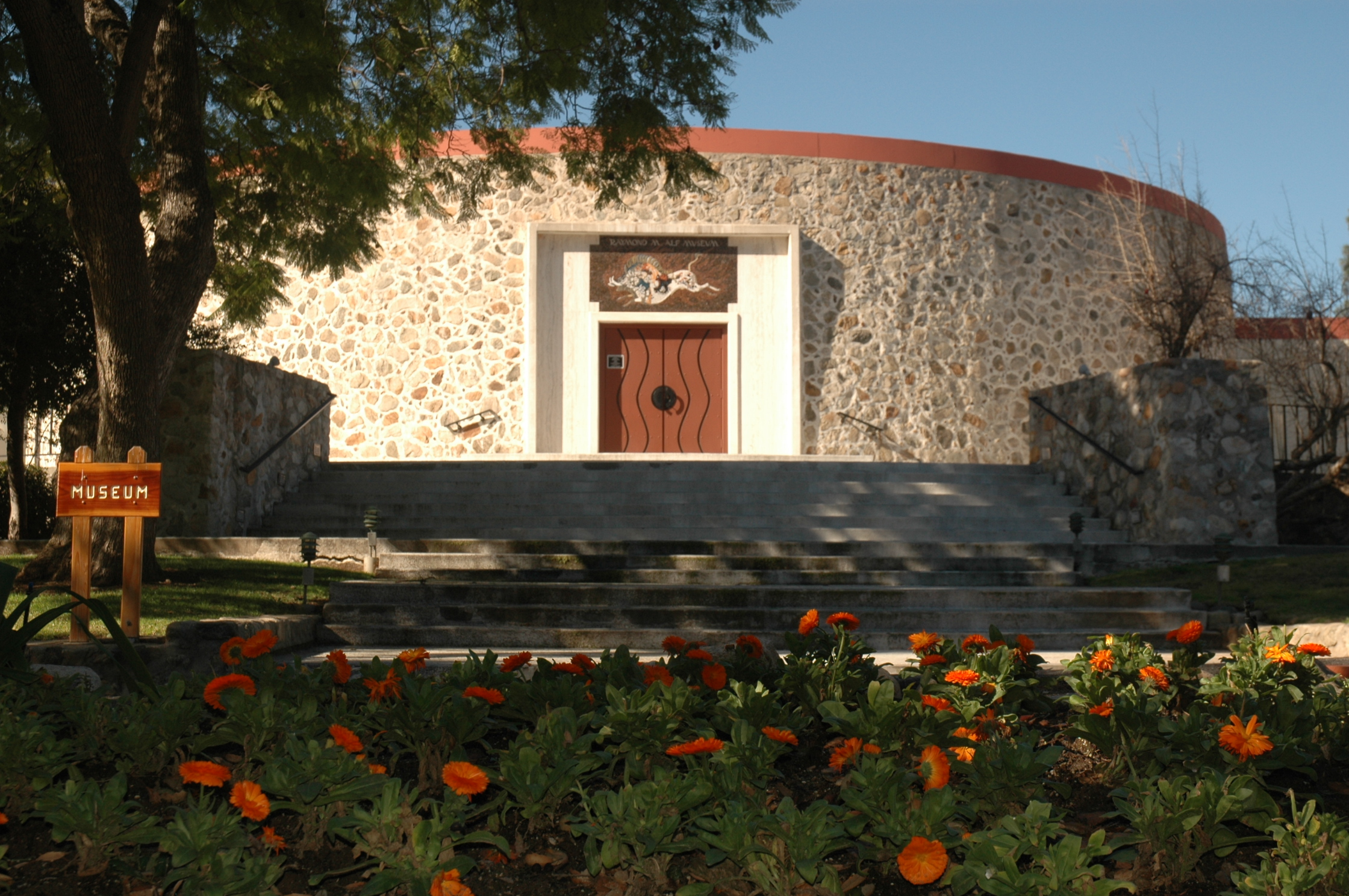
Raymond M. Alf Museum of Paleontology Facade

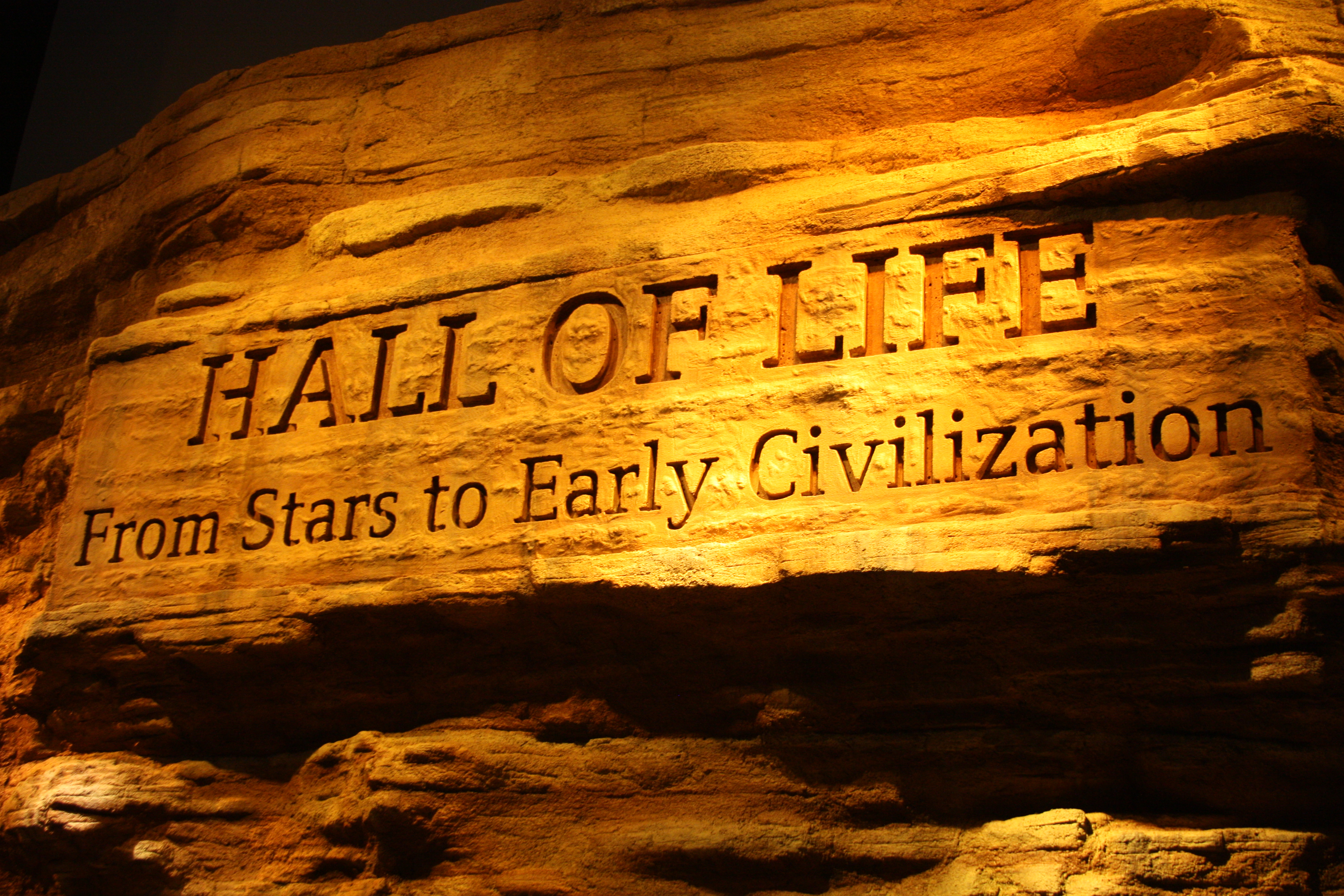
Hall of Life Entrance

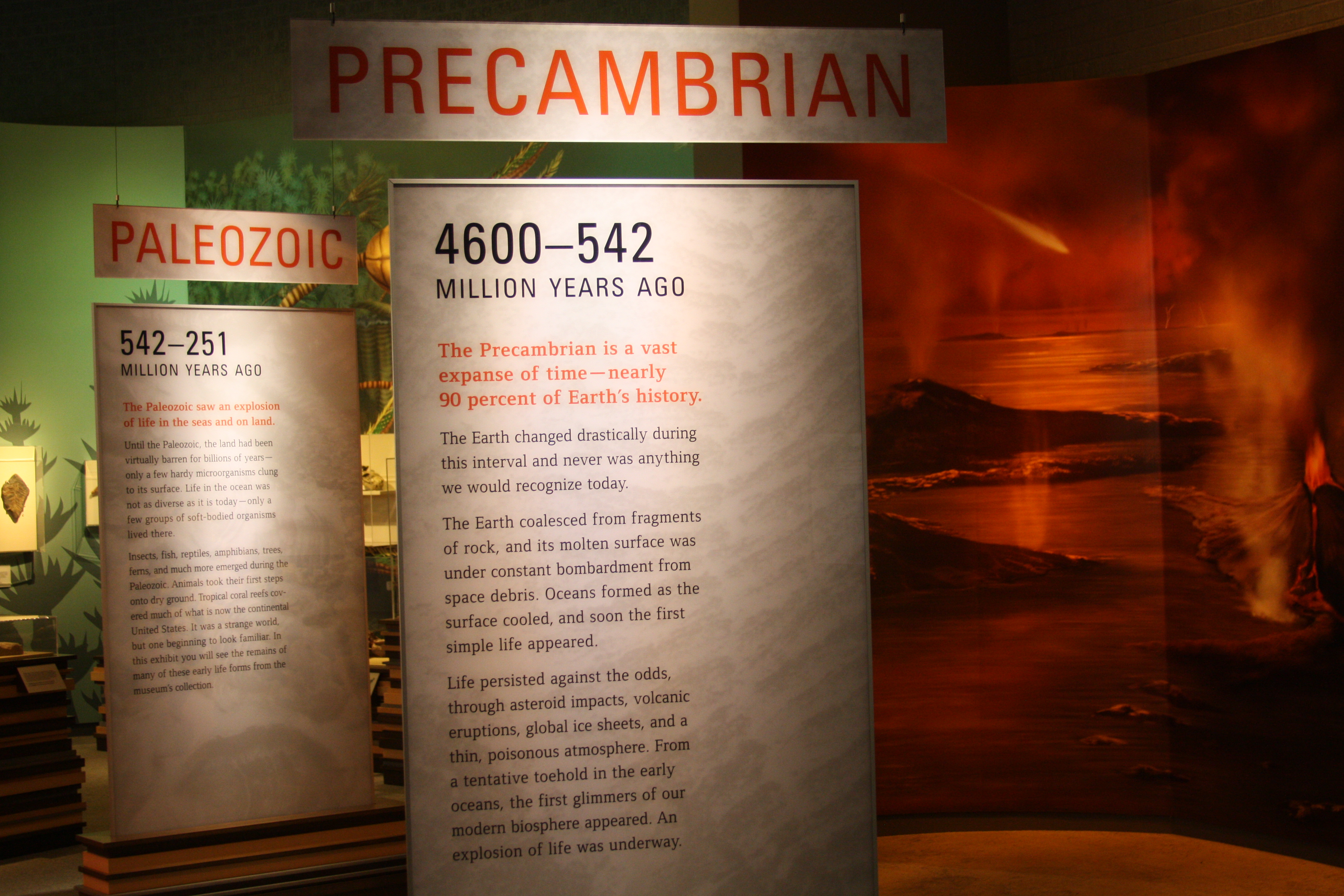
The beginning of the Hall of Life Exhibit

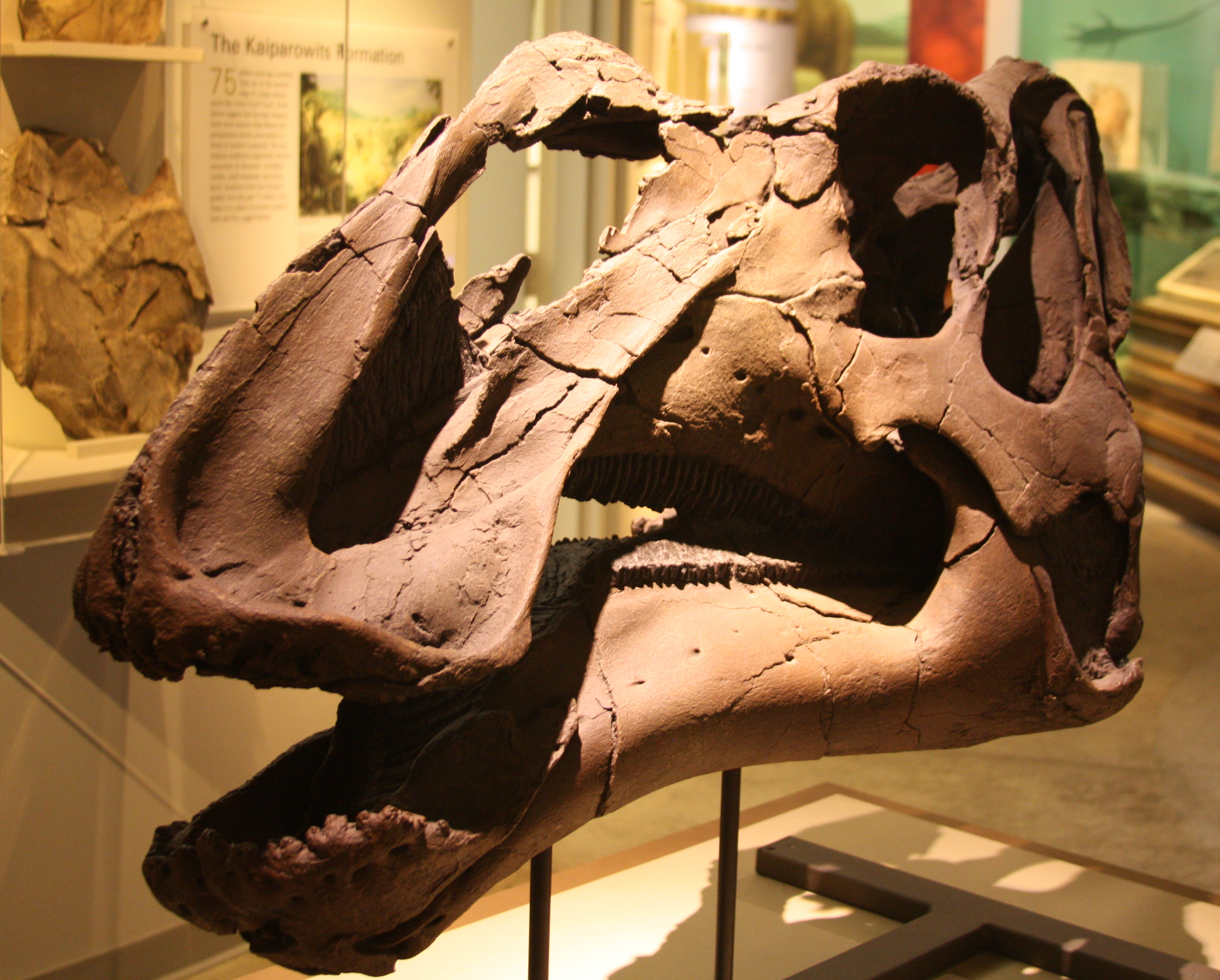
The holotypeGryposaurus monumentsis skull

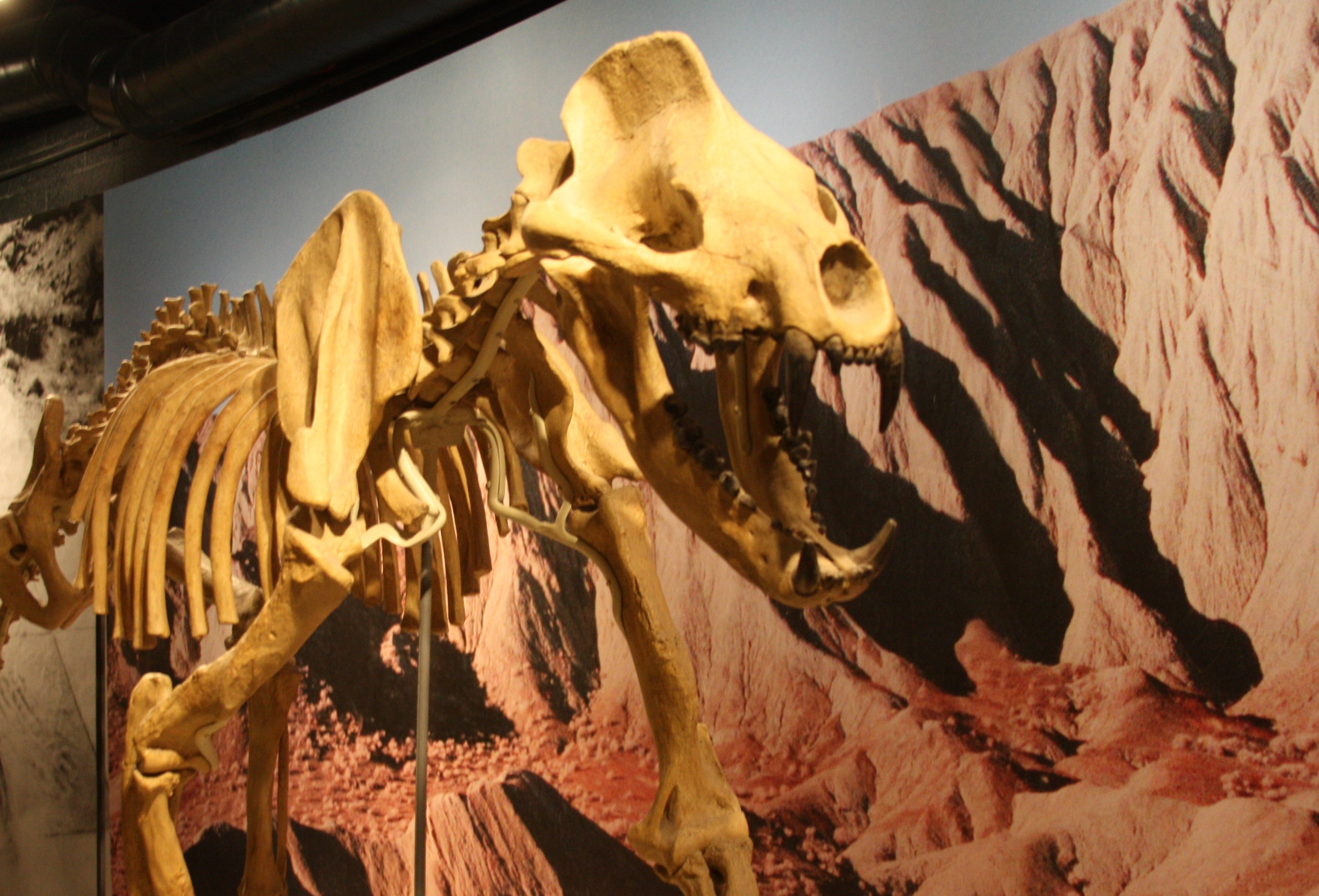
Skeletal cast of the giant bear-dog, Amphicyon

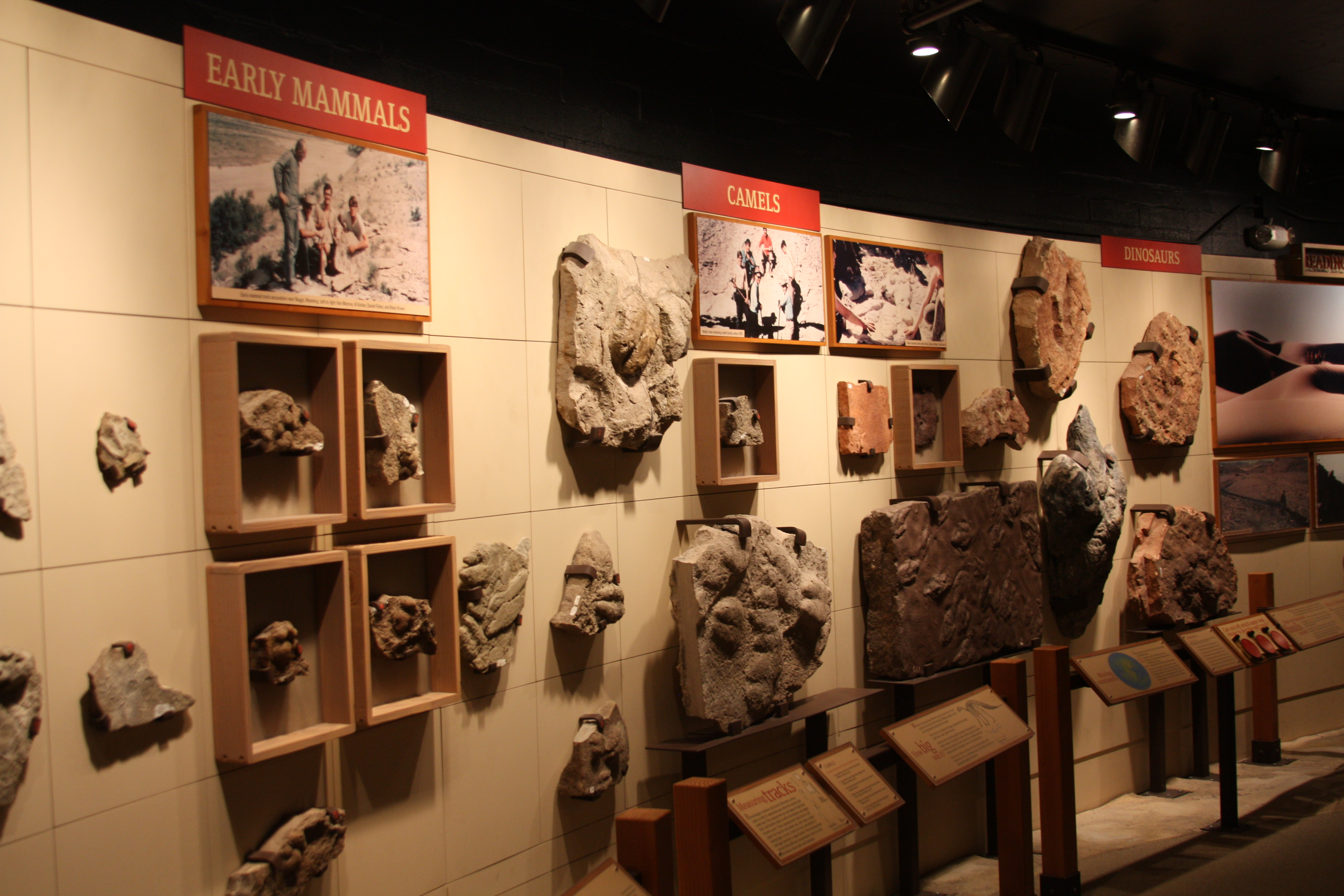
Variety of trackways displayed in the Hall of Footprints

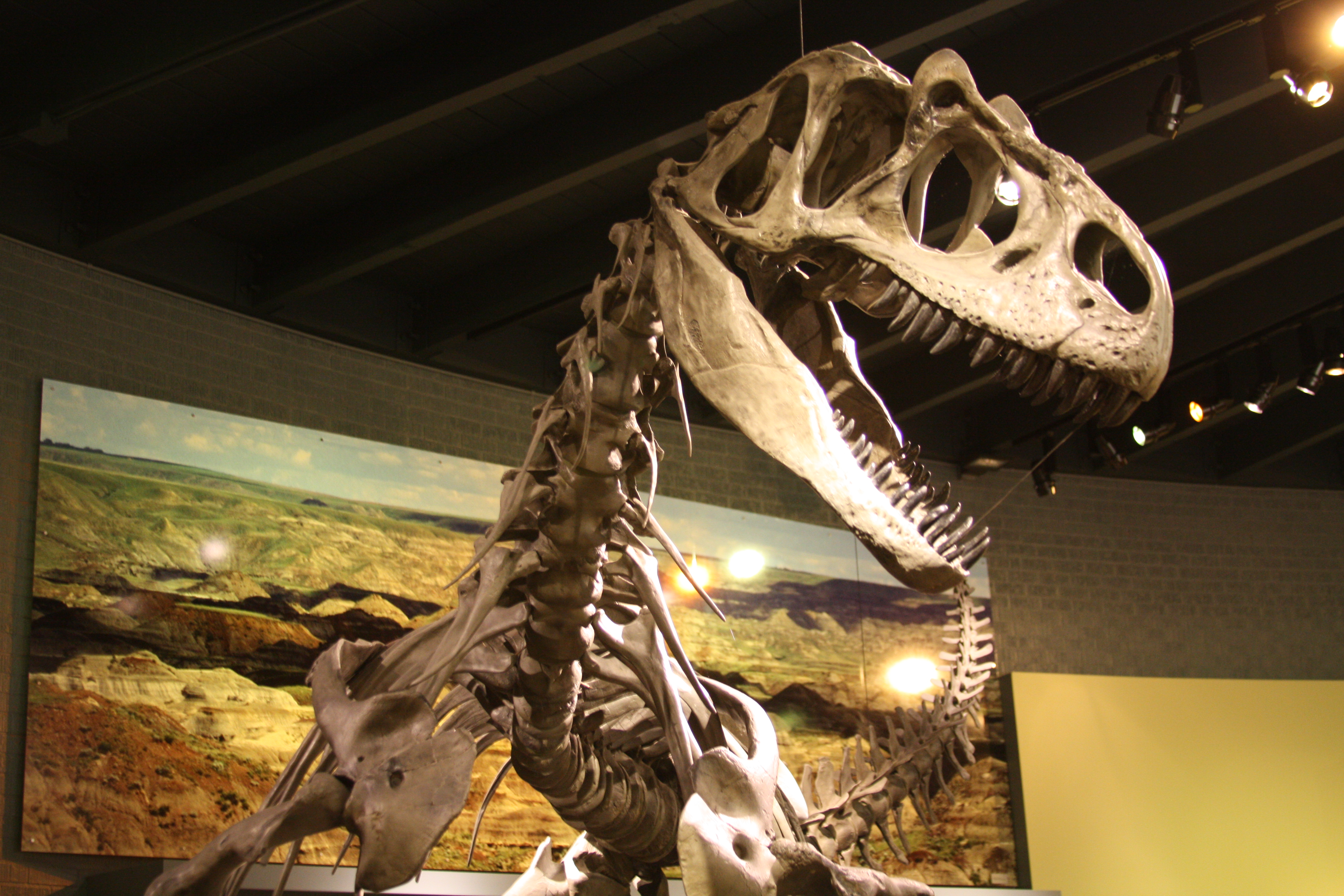
Skeletal cast of the dinosaur, Allosaurus
