= BBC Arabic =

Arabic-language service of the BBC

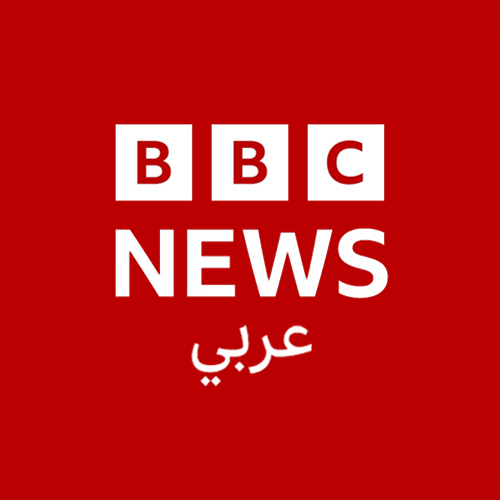
- Country: United Kingdom
- Headquarters: BBC Broadcasting House, London
- Broadcast area: Worldwide (website and online streaming); Middle East (radio and TV)
- Owner: BBC World Service
- Parent: BBC
- Launch date: January 1938; 88 years ago
- Dissolved: 23 January 2023 (radio)
- Television: BBC News Arabic
- Official website: www.bbc.co.uk/persian

BBC Arabic (Arabic: بي بي سي عربي) consisted of the Literary Arabic language radio station which was run by the BBC World Service, as well as the BBC's satellite TV channel, and the website that serves as a Literary Arabic language news portal and provides online access to both the TV and radio broadcasts.

The radio service was broadcast from Broadcasting House in London as well as from a BBC bureau in Riyadh. The target audience was in the Arab world (North Africa and Western Asia).

In September 2022, the World Service announced the proposed closure of its Arabic radio service as part of a cost-cutting plan, but said that an online service would remain.

On Friday, 27 January 2023, BBC Arabic's radio broadcasts ended at 13:00 UTC. The service had been on air since 1938.

== History ==
=== Origins ===
In 1936, the BBC helped the British Colonial Office set up the Palestine Broadcasting Service in Jerusalem, a medium wave radio broadcast. This was created as a way to broadcast British views to the Arab world. This was partly in response to the Italian Literary Arabic language radio broadcasts that were transmitted by medium wave from Bari, and also in short wave from Rome, beginning in 1934. After the Second Italo-Abyssinian War, these broadcasts became strongly anti-British.

In the years leading up to the 1938 establishment of the BBC Literary Arabic language service, there were plans by the British Foreign Office to set up radio broadcasts based in Cyprus. Cyprus at the time was a Crown Colony in the British Empire, and seen as more stable than Palestine, a British Mandate. Also during this time, the BBC was insistent that its established news standards not be compromised in the name of broadcasting Arabic-language British propaganda.

In 1938, 16 years after the British Broadcasting Corporation was founded, the BBC began broadcasting in Literary Arabic. BBC Arabic is considered one of the oldest and longest running foreign-language news services.

=== Early programming ===
The BBC Arabic service started in 1938 as 65-minute broadcasts. In 1940 the broadcasts had grown to 1 hour and 25 minutes, and close to two hours by 1942. By the end of World War II, the Literary Arabic language programme was three hours.

The first broadcasts in 1938 featured one news bulletin. Later, by 1940, a second news bulletin followed the morning reading of the Quran. In 1942 a third news bulletin was broadcast at "midday" at 10:45 GMT, 12:45 local time in the Levant. While the news bulletins were essentially translations of the BBC's English-language Empire Service, BBC London was in direct contact with the Foreign Office's diplomatic posts abroad as a source of local news. In 1943 the Literary Arabic Service established a Cairo Office, enabling direct news gathering in the Middle East.

=== Key figures ===
==== First organizer ====
- Steward Perowne (1938–39)

==== First editors ====
- A. S. Calvert (1938)
- Donald Stephenson (from 1939)

==== Director, Near Eastern Services ====
- Sigmar Hillelson (from 1940)

==== Director, Eastern Services ====
- Donald Stephenson (from 1945)

==== Head, Eastern Services ====
- Charles Pennethorne Hughes (from 1948)

==== Head, Eastern Service ====
- Gordon Waterfeield (from 1949)

==== Head, Arabic Service ====
- Gordon Waterfield (from 1959)
- James Thomson (from 196)
- Charles McLelland (from 1971)
- Hamilton Duckworth (from 1976)
- Eric Bowman (from 1981)
- James Norris (from 1986)
- Bob Jobbins (from 1988)

== Programming ==
BBC Arabic broadcast programmes and hourly news bulletins 24 hours a day, 7 days a week.

=== Radio broadcasts ===
- Hadeeth as-Saa'a ("Hourly Updates")
- Tahqeeq (Investigation)
- BBC Xtra (Daily programme)

=== Television programmes ===
- Nuqtat Hewar ("Talking Point")
- Alimna (Our World)
- 4 Tech (Technology programme)
- Sa'at Hisaab (Tunisia two months after the revolution)
- Saba'at Ayyam ("Seven Days")
- Hasaad al-Yowm ("Today's Harvest", news round-up)
- Al-Ahamm wa al-Muhimm ("The Most Important and the Important")
- Barnamaj liqaa' (Interview programme)

== Television ==
The BBC launched an Arabic-language satellite channel on 11 March 2008.

== Web ==
BBC Arabic radio and television both use the BBC Arabic website as an online news portal. The website facilitates online access to the other two broadcasts.

== Phone ==
A live stream of BBC Arabic is available to listeners in the US by calling 712-432-7877.

== Notable people ==
- Madiha Rashid Al-Madfai, broadcaster
- Salwa Jarrah, broadcaster
- Huda al-Rasheed, broadcaster
