= Document dump =

Hostile response to a request for information

A document dump is the act of responding to an adversary's request for information by presenting the adversary with a large quantity of data that is transferred in a manner that indicates unfriendliness, hostility, or a legal conflict between the transmitter and the receiver of the information. The shipment of dumped documents is unsorted, or contains a large quantity of information that is extraneous to the issue under inquiry, or is presented in an untimely manner, or some combination of these three characteristics. The phrase is often used by lawyers, but is in increasing use in the blogosphere. It is often seen as part of the characteristic behavior of an entity that is engaging in an ongoing pattern of activities intended to cover up unethical or criminal conduct.

== Examples ==
As one facet of the dismissal of U.S. attorneys controversy in 2007, relevant committees of both houses of the United States Congress, controlled by the Democratic Party, requested, and then subpoenaed, backstory information from the United States Department of Justice on how the process that resulted in these dismissals had taken place. The Justice Department was reluctant to respond in a friendly manner to these requests, which they regarded as hostile; the Department responded with significant quantities of unsorted and extraneous information. Many U.S. liberals saw this response as a series of document dumps and communicated amongst themselves accordingly:

A big new bundle of documents just got dumped by the Department of Justice. Here's a link to the documents in PDF form at the House Judiciary Committee website. As per our routine in recent document dumps, if you'd like to help us cull through the mails and reports, use this thread to share your findings with us and other TPMm Readers. Identify the items you find by document dump set number and page number. (Josh Marshall, April 27, 2007).

Document dumps are not restricted to the field of politics. Large organizations of all types have become adept at overwhelming news organizations and other entities requesting information under state and federal freedom of information and open records laws. In a 2011 example, the University of North Carolina at Chapel Hill responded to an appeals court order to release certain records related to 11 specific athletes with a document dump of thousands of pages of phone records and parking tickets. The court's order was related to a media request under North Carolina open records law related to an ongoing NCAA investigation of the UNC football program.

An underlying principle of information theory is that information must be comprehensible in order to be useful. One universal characteristic of a document dump is that its shippers intend to slow down the process through which their adversaries can make this information comprehensible. In an effort to minimize negative coverage by the news media, document dumps will often take place at times when reporters are not on duty, such as late on a Friday when media members have left for the weekend. The Friday night news dump is a classic technique for politicians to announce a decision or action which they know will be controversial.

The term "document dump" is rarely used in public by the shipper or its workers. Public use of the phrase tends to be confined to the recipients of the information.
