= Jordan Ryan =

American diplomat

Jordan Ryan (born in 1950) joined The Carter Center as Vice President for Peace Programs in 2015.

Ryan served as Assistant Administrator for the United Nations Development Programme at the level of Assistant Secretary-General and Director of the UNDP Bureau for Crisis Prevention and Recovery.

Prior to his appointment as Assistant Administrator, Ryan was Deputy Special Representative of the UN Secretary-General and the UN Resident and Humanitarian Coordinator of the United Nations Mission in Liberia from 2006 until 2009.

His 20 years of experience with the UN includes serving at different capacities in developing countries and in post-crisis setting. He joined the UNDP in China as Assistant Resident Representative in 1991. Between 1993 and 1996, he worked as Senior Assistant Resident Representative and later as Deputy Resident Representative in Viet Nam.

Between 1996 and 1997, he was Deputy Director of the Office of the Administrator in the Headquarters of UNDP in New York City. From 1997 to 2001, he became Director of that office.

Ryan graduated high school from the Webb School of California. He obtained his B.A. in anthropology from Yale University. He also holds a J.D. from George Washington University and a M.A. from Columbia School of International and Public Affairs. He was a visiting fellow at the Kennedy School of Government, Harvard University in 2001.
