= TPMCafe =

TPMCafe was a center-left blog portal created by Josh Marshall as a spin-off blog to his popular Talking Points Memo. It debuted on May 31, 2005.

TPM Cafe featured a collection of blogs about a wide range of domestic and foreign policy issues written by academics, journalists and former public officials among others. These included Paul Begala, Daniel Benjamin, Steve Clemons, Jonathan Cohn, Brad DeLong, Amitai Etzioni, Todd Gitlin, Danny Goldberg, Reed Hundt, John Ikenberry, Larry C. Johnson, Michael Lind, Kevin Phillips, Mark Schmitt, Anne-Marie Slaughter, Ruy Teixeira, Elizabeth Warren, among others.

The blog also had a Table for One blog where a notable person guest-writes for a week. Vice-presidential candidate John Edwards was the first such guest; others have included Paul Hackett, Anthony Romero, Bernie Sanders, Tom Vilsack, Wesley Clark, Sherrod Brown, and Russ Feingold. There is also a TPM Bookclub blog, where authors discuss their works and answers questions from readers. Featured authors have included Peter Beinart, Thomas Frank, Anthony Shadid, Larry Diamond, George Packer, Robert Dreyfuss, Chris Mooney, Gene Sperling, and Kevin Phillips. Matthew Yglesias was until September 2006 a flagship blogger and associate editor for the site.

In TPMCafe readers could not only comment on the main posts but also initiate discussions and write their own blogs. The comment section for each post included a ranking feature.
