= Deborah Zarin =

Deborah Zarin is a program director at the Multi-Regional Clinical Trials Center of Brigham and Women's Hospital and Harvard University. She was formerly a scientist at the National Institutes of Health and the director of ClinicalTrials.gov.

Zarin has a reputation as an advocate for open data.

In 2014 Zarin accepted a visiting scholar appointment at the Stanford University School of Medicine to research the quality of scientific investigations.

== Bibliography ==
- Ross, J. S.; Tse, T.; Zarin, D. A.; Xu, H.; Zhou, L.; Krumholz, H. M. (2012). "Publication of NIH funded trials registered in ClinicalTrials.gov: cross sectional analysis". BMJ. 344 (jan03 1): d7292–d7292. doi:10.1136/bmj.d7292. ISSN 0959-8138. PMC 3623605. PMID 22214755.
- "Is a Trial For You?", an article from 2005 in The Washington Post
- Zarin, Deborah A. (2013). "Participant-Level Data and the New Frontier in Trial Transparency". New England Journal of Medicine. 369 (5): 468–469. doi:10.1056/NEJMe1307268. ISSN 0028-4793. PMID 23902488.
- Zarin, D. A.; Tse, T.; Williams, R. J.; Rajakannan, T. (2017). "Update on Trial Registration 11 Years after the ICMJE Policy Was Established". New England Journal of Medicine. 376: 383–391. doi:10.1056/NEJMsr1601330. ISSN 0028-4793. PMC 5813248.
