= Talking Point (Australian TV series) =

- Genre: Talk show
- Presented by: Angus Maude; Joe Gullett
- Country of origin: Australia
- Original language: English

Original release
- Network: ATN-7
- Release: 1960 – 1962

Talking Point is an Australian television series which aired 1960 to 1962 on Sydney station ATN-7 (Australian TV was not fully networked at the time, and most non-imported series aired on a single station). It was a discussion series featuring a panel of four. Angus Maude was the original host, later it was hosted by Joe Gullett. In one episode, the panel criticised the banning of the book Lady Chatterley's Lover, in another episode there was a debate on the future of the United Nations, while another episode featured a discussion of the space race.

== Episode status ==
Despite airing in an era where wiping of television series was common, three 1961 episodes are held by the National Film and Sound Archive.
