= National Center for Health Research =

Non-profit organization

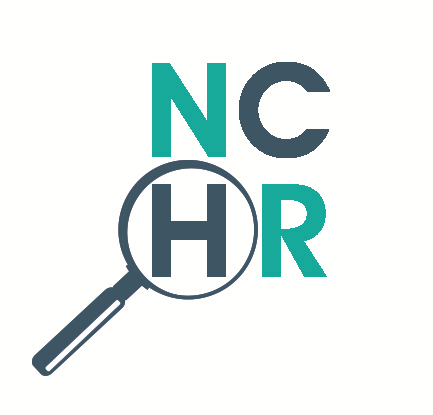
- Founded: 1999
- Founder: Diana Zuckerman
- Type: Think tank
- Purpose: Conducts and scrutinizes research to improve the health and safety of adults and children.
- Location: Washington, D.C.
- Product: Health and medical information and assistance
- Key people: Diana Zuckerman, President
- Website: www.center4research.org

The National Center for Health Research (NCHR) is a nonpartisan think tank based in Washington, D.C., founded by Dr. Diana Zuckerman, its current president. Originally founded on December 21, 1999 under the name National Research Center for Women & Families (changed to the National Center for Health Research in 2014), its mission is to conduct, analyze, and explain health research to the public.

NCHR states that it works with federal and state governments, health professionals, and the public on a wide range of health issues, focusing primarily on research and policies regarding the evidence standards for the safety and effectiveness of medical and consumer products, providing testimony at hearing in the U.S Senate and U.S House of Representatives and quoted in national newspapers. The testimony and quotes in the media often criticize the FDA's standards as not sufficiently scientific, in contrast to the statements of the industry experts who testify at those same hearings and are quoted in the same news stories.

== Research ==
In February 2011, NCHR staff completed a study on the various alternative approval processes for medical devices at the Food and Drug Administration (FDA). Authors associated with the NCHR published a study examining how often the different approval or clearance processes were used for medical devices that were subsequently recalled for life-threatening problems. The study resulted in a hearing by the U.S. House of Representatives that debated the safety of medical devices and the reason for high-risk recalls. The House hearing featured testimony from the NCHR study co-author, Dr. Steven Nissen of the Cleveland Clinic, and cardiologist Dr. Rita Redberg from University of California, San Francisco, who had published an editorial supporting the findings of the NCHR study.

In April 2011, NCHR President Diana Zuckerman testified before the U.S. Senate Special Committee on Aging about the study's findings at a hearing on medical devices.

In 2014, the organization published a study in the JAMA Internal Medicine journal about the scientific evidence submitted to the FDA to support the marketing of implanted medical devices under the agency's 510(k) review process. The study concluded that most of the implanted devices were not required to submit data from clinical trials or scientific evidence of safety or effectiveness before they could be sold.

In 2017, the NCHR staff published a paper in Milbank Quarterly criticizing the FDA for its failure to safeguard electronic health records and other device software from hacking and other cybersecurity threats. They stated, "Current regulations are necessary but not sufficient for ensuring patient safety by identifying and eliminating dangerous defects in software currently on the market". They added that legislative changes resulting from the law entitled the 21st Century Cures Act "will further deregulate health IT, reducing safeguards that facilitate the reporting and timely recall of flawed medical software that could harm patients."

The NCHR published another study in Milbank Quarterly in 2018 called "Diversity in Medical Device Clinical Trials: Do We Know What Works for Which Patients?". The study investigated whether new, high-risk medical devices had been proven safe and effective for women, minorities, or patients over 65 years of age. The paper concluded that most studies did not conduct subgroup analysis on all these major demographic groups, thus providing no information about safety or effectiveness for most patients.

In 2021, NCHR published an article in the American Journal of Public Health entitled, "Emergency Use Authorizations (EUAS) Versus FDA Approval: Implications for COVID-19 and Public Health", explaining how FDA's emergency pathway was used by the agency to rapidly respond to the need for diagnostic tests, treatments, and personal protective equipment during the COVID pandemic, in ways that were sometimes beneficial but also resulted in inaccurate test results and products that were later found to be ineffective.

== Awards ==
Two awards are given by the Center each year:

- The Foremother Lifetime Achievement Award "recognizes women who expanded women's horizons, improved our communities, and made remarkable contributions to our country".
- The Health Policy Heroes Award "honors men and women (and sometimes boys and girls) who have changed the public debate and public policies in ways that help to improve the lives of adults and children nationwide".

== Publications ==
- Fox-Rawlings, Stephanie R.; Gottschalk, Laura B.; Doamekpor, Laurén A.; Zuckerman, Diana M. (September 2018). "Diversity in Medical Device Clinical Trials: Do We Know What Works for Which Patients?". The Milbank Quarterly. 96 (3): 499–529. doi:10.1111/1468-0009.12344. PMC 6131322. PMID 30203600.
- Ronquillo, Jay G.; Zuckerman, Diana M. (September 2017). "Software-Related Recalls of Health Information Technology and Other Medical Devices: Implications for FDA Regulation of Digital Health". The Milbank Quarterly. 95 (3): 535–553. doi:10.1111/1468-0009.12278. PMC 5594275. PMID 28895231.
- Zuckerman, Diana; Doamekpor, Laurén Abla (June 2015). "More data are needed for Essure hysteroscopic sterilization device". Contraception. 91 (6): 520. doi:10.1016/j.contraception.2015.02.027. PMID 25779602.
- Gonsalves, G.; Zuckerman, D. (25 March 2015). "Commentary: Will 20th century patient safeguards be reversed in the 21st century?". BMJ. 350 (mar25 7) h1500. doi:10.1136/bmj.h1500. PMID 25814537. S2CID 19510018.
- Zuckerman, Diana; Brown, Paul; Das, Aditi (1 November 2014). "Lack of Publicly Available Scientific Evidence on the Safety and Effectiveness of Implanted Medical Devices". JAMA Internal Medicine. 174 (11): 1781–7. doi:10.1001/jamainternmed.2014.4193. PMID 25265047.
- Zuckerman, Diana M.; Brown, Paul; Nissen, Steven E. (13 June 2011). "Medical Device Recalls and the FDA Approval Process". Archives of Internal Medicine. 171 (11): 1006–11. doi:10.1001/archinternmed.2011.30. PMID 21321283.
