= Talking Point (BBC Arabic) =

TV and radio phone-in program broadcast on BBC Arabic Service

Talking Point (Nuqtat Hewar) is a TV and Radio phone-in program broadcast on BBC Arabic Service. It was launched on March 26, 2003. The first edition of Nuqtat Hewar presented listeners' views on the war in Iraq.

The program goes live five days a week. First part is broadcast live on the radio and television from 15:06 till 15:57 GMT. The second part is broadcast only on the radio from 16:06 till 16:30 GMT time.

Talking Point reaches its audience through various number of communication channels. The program has a Facebook fan page and a Twitter account.

== Current presenters ==
- Samir Farah
- Nur Zorgui
- Rasha Qandeel

== Previous presenters ==
- Nahed Najjar
- Liliane Daoud
