= Al-Hikma University College =

University in Baghdad, Iraq

Coordinates: 33.3007°N 44.4358°E

Al-Hikma University
- Type: Originally private; nationalized 1966–69; merged with Baghdad University
- Active: 1956–1969
- Religious affiliation: Founded by Jesuits (Roman Catholic)
- Students: approx. 650 (1968)
- Location: Baghdad, Iraq
- Language: Mostly English
- Website: Al Hikma

Al-Hikma University college (Arabic: كليةالحكمةالجامعة) was a university in Baghdad founded in 1956 by members of the New England Province of the Society of Jesus. Al hikma means "wisdom" in English.

== History ==
=== Baghdad College ===
Four American Jesuits were sent to Iraq in 1932 at the request of Pope Pius XI, upon the urging of the Patriarch of the Chaldean Catholic Church, as the Kingdom of Iraq prepared for its independence from Great Britain. There they founded Baghdad College, which soon became known as an institution of academic excellence.

=== Al-Hikma University ===
In 1952 the decision was made to provide a university-level facility for the city. The buildings were designed and built by the Jesuits on a 195-acre campus (al-Za'franiya) south of Baghdad.

==== Library ====
In 1960, the construction of a new library building for Al-Hikma University commenced. It was funded by the Ford Foundation (Qubain 1966), but the foundation expected the university to find the money for furnishing it. The building was completed in 1962, when the collection was around 20,000 volumes. Although the library was not architecturally commendable, it was reported to have attracted some imitators. It had a collection of 327 manuscripts, a private collection donated in 1965, which were catalogued with support funded by a grant from the Rockefeller Foundation (Qazanchi 1970). In the late 1960s, Gurgis Awad (Librarian of the Iraqi Museum) donated his private collection to the Al-Hikma University Library (Zado 1990).

==== Students and staff ====
When it opened in 1956, the university's initial student body numbered 45 students. By its closure, Al-Hikma University was admitting about 150 each year, and there were 656 students in total.

Al-Hikma University's student body was diverse in ethnicity, religion and gender. Students were roughly 40 percent Muslim, 32 percent Catholic, 21 percent Orthodox Christian, and about 7 percent Jewish. The staff were also mixed: roughly half were Jesuits, while Iraqi lay teachers (both Christian and Muslim), Fulbright professors, and a small group of volunteer teachers from abroad made up the rest.

=== Nationalization ===
In 1966, a law was passed under which the private universities were converted into public universities, but continued to charge tuition fees. In 1968, a new law nationalised Al-Hikma University. In autumn 1968, an Iraqi was imposed as president of the university. The university became the object of protests by groups of nationalist students. Eventually, in November, the American faculty of the university were expelled by the Baathist government and the institution was integrated into Baghdad University. The college was seized, along with all the Jesuits' property, by the government the following year, and the foreign faculty were also expelled.

== Legacy ==
Reunions of graduates of both Baghdad College and Al-Hikma University continue to be held bi-annually. Recent ones were organised in Chicago in July 2006 and in Detroit in July 2009.

The history of the Jesuit mission in Iraq has been chronicled by the Rev. Joseph MacDonnell, S.J., late of Fairfield University, in his book Jesuits by the Tigris.

== See also ==
- List of Jesuit sites

== Bibliography ==
- Qazanchi, F.Y.M. Academic libraries in Iraq. 1970. Al-Mustansiriya University Review, 1, 158–167
- Qubain, F.I. Education and Science in the Arab World.1966. Baltimore, MD: Johns Hopkins Press
- Zado, V.Y. The General Information Programme (PGI) and developing countries: a case study of Iraq. 1990. PhD thesis, Loughborough University
