= Steven Nissen =

American cardiologist (born 1948)

Steven E. Nissen (born 1948) is an American cardiologist, researcher and patient advocate. He was chairman of cardiovascular medicine at the Cleveland Clinic, in Cleveland, Ohio.

Joining Cleveland Clinic in 1992, Nissen served as Vice-Chairman of the Department of Cardiology (1993–2002), Section Head of Clinical Cardiology (1992–2000), and Director of the Coronary Intensive Care Unit (1992–1997). Most recently, he served as Medical Director of the Cleveland Clinic Cardiovascular Coordinating Center (C5), an organization that directs multi-center clinical trials. Nissen still attends in the Cardiac Critical Care Unit periodically throughout the year.

== Education ==
Nissen graduated high school from the Webb School of California and pursued his undergraduate degree at the University of Michigan. He then went on to receive his medical degree from the University of Michigan School of Medicine in Ann Arbor. He completed his internal medicine internship and residency at the University of California, Davis in Sacramento, and thereafter completed his cardiology fellowship at the University of Kentucky Medical Center in Lexington.

== Imaging technology ==
He produced the first images in humans in 1990 and began using IVUS to document the ubiquitous prevalence of coronary artery disease. The technology has been the basis for his research during the last decade and Nissen is currently the principal investigator for several large IVUS atherosclerosis trials.

== Advocacy ==
Nissen has led a number of inquiries as to the scientific integrity of many medications currently on the market. Starting with linked COX-2 inhibitors, such as Vioxx (rofecoxib) in 2001, Nissen was one of the first physicians to link it to an increased risk of heart attacks and strokes. Three years later Merck pulled Vioxx from the market when additional studies confirmed that daily, long-term use of the drug could increase the risk of heart attacks and strokes.

In 2005, Nissen re-analyzed the data related to the Bristol-Myers Squibb drug Pargluva (muraglitazar), an experimental type 2 diabetes drug. When an U.S. Food and Drug Administration (FDA) advisory panel charged with reviewing the clinical trial data approved the drug, he immediately began an in-depth analysis.

In 2007, the meta-analysis by Nissen and his co-investigator Kathy Wolksi, published in the Journal of the American Medical Association online on October 20, found that the diabetes drug rosiglitazone (Avandia) produced by GlaxoSmithKline carried high cardiovascular risks. The FDA issued an alert on May 21, 2007, leading to a warning by the Food and Drug Administration and a sales loss of about 75% for the drug. The FDA was not made aware of the Nissen meta-analysis results until the day of its publication. In an editorial written in the Wall Street Journal, former FDA deputy commissioner Scott Gottlieb characterized the failure to inform FDA of the results in advance of publication as "upstage the FDA in an attempt to influence public debate". BioCentury editor Steve Edelson said that congressional staffers but not the FDA had been briefed on the study results in advance.

In November 2013, the FDA lifted its earlier restrictions on rosiglitazone after reviewing the results of the 2009 RECORD clinical trial (a six-year, open label randomized control trial), which failed to show heart infarct risks associated with the drug.

== Research ==
In 2003, Nissen led a Journal of the American Medical Association study, producing evidence that five weekly infusions of ApoA-I Milano/phospholipids complex, a synthetic form of HDL, can possibly remove significant amounts of plaque from coronary arteries. The lipoprotein enhanced the ability of HDL cholesterol to usher fat out of the arteries and into the liver for excretion leading to the purchase of Esperion Therapeutics, the tiny company that had produced recombinant Apo-A1 Milano, by Pfizer for $1.3 billion.

Also in 2005, Nissen published the results of the REVERSAL trial, a head-to-head comparison of the statins atorvastatin (Lipitor) and pravastatin (Pravachol). IVUS images showed that Lipitor had effectively halted the progression of plaque buildup, but coronary disease progressed considerably in those given Pravachol. The study suggested that treatments should aim to lower LDL cholesterol levels as much as possible.

In 2006, Nissen and his co-investigators reported on The ASTEROID trial (A Study to Evaluate the Effect of Rosuvastatin On Intravascular Ultrasound-Derived Coronary Atheroma Burden). The study concluded that intensive use of statins resulting in a decreased LDL and increased HDL can reverse the build-up of plaque in coronary arteries, as measured by IVUS.

== Advisor ==
- Served the U.S. Food and Drug Administration as a member of the CardioRenal Advisory Panel from 2000 until 2005, serving as Chairman for the final year of his appointment.
- Testified before Congress and serves as a resource to several key members of Congress on healthcare-related issues.

== Conflict of Interest ==
There have been allegations about Nissen's potential conflicts of interest.

== Awards and recognitions ==
- In 2007, he was named one of the 100 Most Influential People in the world (Time 100) by Time Magazine.
- Outstanding Teacher Award by the Cleveland Clinic Fellows in Cardiovascular Medicine in 2004, 1998, and 1993.
- Gill Heart Institute Award of the University of Kentucky for Outstanding Contributions to Cardiovascular Research in 2004.

== Publications ==
- Nissen has authored more than 350 journal articles and book chapters, mostly in the field of cardiovascular imaging. (Search National Library of Medicine)
- Editorship of Current Cardiology Report
- Senior Consulting Editor to the Journal of the American College of Cardiology for 5 years
- Serves on the editorial board of eleven other journals.
