= Talking Points Memo =

American politics website

- Main page of Talking Points Memo as of August 2010
- Website type: Political blog, news, discussion forum
- Available in: English
- Owner: Josh Marshall
- Creator: Josh Marshall
- Editor: Josh Marshall
- Website: talkingpointsmemo.com
- Commercial: Subscription and advertising supported
- Registration: For discussion forum
- Launched: November 12, 2000; 25 years ago
- Current status: Active

Talking Points Memo (TPM) is a liberal political news and commentary website that started as a blog created and run by Josh Marshall. It debuted in November 2000. The name is a tongue-in-cheek reference to a "talking points memo" that was often discussed during the Clinton-era Monica Lewinsky scandal.

TPM became one of the first online-only political news websites to launch a membership program in 2012. As of 2025, the site has more than 35,000 members and about a dozen staffers.

== Early years ==
TPM was founded as a political blog in 2000 by Marshall, who until 2004 was the site's sole employee. In 2005, he incorporated TPM Media LLC, and the company began to grow.

In the mid-2000s, the company launched a series of projects under the TPM umbrella. A spin-off blog, TPMCafe, debuted on May 31, 2005. This site featured a collection of blogs about a wide range of domestic and foreign policy issues written by academics, journalists, and former public officials, among others. Guest bloggers included politicians, such as then-senators Sherrod Brown, Bernie Sanders and John Kerry and at-the-time future senator Elizabeth Warren; journalists, including Ezra Klein, Dahlia Lithwick, Paul Krugman, George Packer, Ed Kilgore, Glenn Greenwald, Jonathan Chait, Peter Beinart, Emily Bazelon, Matthew Yglesias, and Michael Crowley; activist Aaron Swartz; policy experts, including Robert Reich and Dean Baker; and novelists Anne Lamott and Jonathan Franzen. TPMCafe has been described as a "social gathering place for readers to share news and opinion," and a precursor to social media.

TPMmuckracker expanded on Marshall’s work, with journalists working for the TPM collective, such as Paul Kiel and Justin Rood, investigating political corruption. TPMDC, founded in January 2007, was staffed by Washington-based journalists and covered politics from the capital. TPM Media also acquired from The American Prospect "The Horse's Mouth," a blog by Greg Sargent about how major news outlets covered Washington politics. Beginning in the summer of 2006, many weekend postings were provided by anonymous blogger DK. On November 11, 2006, DK was revealed to be attorney David Kurtz, who went on to serve as an editor for the site.

By 2007, TPM received an average of 400,000 page views every weekday.

== Coverage ==
During George W. Bush’s presidency, TPM closely covered the administration’s effort to privatize Social Security. The site also distinguished itself in 2006 for breaking a series of stories related to the U.S. Attorneys scandal. In 2007, TPM won a George Polk Award for legal reporting for its coverage, becoming the first online-only outlet to receive the award. In 2009, TPM opened a Washington, D.C. office and joined the White House press pool to cover the Obama administration, along with several other progressive news outlets.

TPM is noted for its coverage of the political fringe, including militias, white nationalists, conspiracy theorists and similar groups, stating that it considers them to be “greater drivers of American politics than mainstream news coverage allows.” In 2015, TPM was early to identify Trump as a serious contender in the Republican presidential primary.

In 2019, TPM was among the first outlets to uncover President Donald Trump’s pressure campaign on Ukrainian president Volodomyr Zelensky. In 2021, TPM was the first outlet to note that Trump had removed the U.S. Attorney for the Northern District of Georgia, BJay Pak, as part of his effort to substantiate false claims of voter fraud.

In 2023, TPM was the first outlet to report that Congressman George Santos had made charges on donors' credit cards without their permission. Santos later pleaded guilty to charges that he had done so.

== Business ==
After relying on advertising for its first decade of existence, TPM introduced a subscription service, TPM Prime, in 2012. Between 2016 and 2017, the site’s membership doubled. In 2020, the site had 35,000 members. By 2025, TPM was almost entirely member-supported, drawing more than 90 percent of its revenue from members. The site offers free memberships for students and those who cannot afford to pay.

TPM’s staff unionized with Writers Guild of America, East in 2018. In 2025, TPM had 18 employees, with teams of reporters in New York and D.C. Marshall serves as editor in chief.

== Reception ==
Historian Rick Perlstein in 2024 wrote about TPM’s coverage of conservative activists, comparing it to that of the New York Times. He stated that the site compiled an archive of how extremism and mainstream politics merged within the Republican Party from the start of President George W. Bush's administration onward, adding that it began in 2000 during a period of new formats and styles in political writing.

Editor Ben Smith in 2012 approvingly described Marshall's investment in original reporting during a time when other digital media outlets were leaning heavily on aggregation. “I think that the investment in original reporting is something he chose to do pretty early when a lot of other people were thinking aggregation was the future,” he said.

Robert W. McChesney and John Nichols describe the site as taking a "more raucous and sensational" tone than traditional news media. This includes coining phrases such as "Bamboozlepalooza" to describe George W. Bush's efforts to privatize Social Security, which the blog opposed; and "bitch-slap politics" to refer to the Swiftboating of 2004 presidential candidate John Kerry.

McChesney and Nichols compare the site's style to the muckraking of Upton Sinclair. The more social aspects of the site, which invite crowdsourcing, were compared to La Follette's Weekly. Tom Rosenstiel, director of the Project for Excellence in Journalism, in 2009 said "TPM is really an advocacy operation that has moved toward journalism."
