= Huda al-Rasheed =

Huda al-Rasheed (or al-Rashid; Arabic: هدى الرشيد) is a Saudi Arabian broadcaster and writer. She was the first woman to present a newscast on Saudi television and was a familiar voice on BBC World Service for more than 40 years.

== Early life ==
Al-Rasheed was born in Unaizah, Najd, Saudi Arabia and educated at boarding schools in Lebanon and Egypt.

== Broadcasting career ==
In the early 1970s she started working as an editor for Okaz, a daily newspaper in Jeddah, and broadcasting on Jeddah Radio, presenting political and arts programs. In 1974 she moved from radio to television, becoming the first woman news presenter in the kingdom when she appeared on Channel One.

Her tenure at Channel One proved brief. While in London to study English, al-Rasheed toured the studios of the BBC. Shortly after returning home, the BBC World Service offered her a position as a radio broadcaster, so she returned to England, joining BBC Arabic on 10 September 1974. She took a hiatus from the BBC starting in 1989 to complete a degree history and English literature at the University of Buckingham, and then master's degrees in media studies, linguistics and translation.

== Writing ==
In addition to broadcasting, al-Rasheed is a novelist and short story writer. Her first publication was a collection of short stories in 1973. She has also published a number of novels.

== Works ==
- 1973: Nisa' 'abr al-athir (Women Over the Ether; short stories)
- 1977: 'Abath (Folly; novel)
- 1977: Ghadan sayakun al-khamis (Tomorrow is Thursday; novel)
- 1980: Misdemeanor (novel)
- 1993: The Divorce (novel)
- 2008: Love (novel)
- 2012: The Devil is Sometimes a Woman (novel)
