= SDR =

SDR or sdr may refer to:

== Science and technology ==
- ETSI Satellite Digital Radio, a European satellite radio standard
- Selective dorsal rhizotomy, a neurosurgery
- Short-chain dehydrogenase, a short-chain dehydrogenases/reductases family, or SDR family
- Single data rate, in synchronous dynamic random-access memory (SDRAM)
- SmartDraw, an image file format with the file extension .sdr
- Software-defined radio, enabling computers to tune a wide spectrum of radio frequencies, using software instead of hardware for modulation and demodulation
- Sony Dream Robot, later dubbed QRIO
- System of distinct representatives, in mathematics
- Sparse distributed representation, in machine intelligence
- Standard dimension ratio, in pipe engineering
- Standard-dynamic-range video, a video with a dynamic range that was standard before high-dynamic-range video
- SDR (audio), or super dynamic range, an audio cassette quality-control and duplication process

== Economics ==
- Special drawing rights, foreign-exchange reserve assets overseen by the IMF
- Social discount rate, a measure of the value of diverting funds to social projects

== Media and entertainment ==
- Stardust Records, a Stardust Promotion label
- Süddeutscher Rundfunk, a former public broadcaster in Germany, then merged into Südwestrundfunk (SWR)
- Swiss Derivatives Review, a magazine for the futures and options industries

== Military ==
- Strategic Defence Review (disambiguation), of the UK Ministry of Defence
- System design review, of a program
- Surveillance detection route, a personal strategy used to identify followers in security operations

== Places ==
- School District of Reedsburg
- Somali Democratic Republic
- Southern Distributor Road, Newport, Wales
- South Devon Railway (heritage railway), Devon, England (National Rail code: SDR)
- Santander Airport, Cantabria, Spain (IATA airport code: SDR)

== Other uses ==
- Sales development representative
- Oraon Sadri language (ISO 639-3 code: sdr)
