= DMR =

DMR is an initialism that may refer to:

== Biology ==
- Differentially methylated regions, a genomic region that is methylated differentially on each parental allele
- Dwarf mistletoe rating system, a scale for rating the severity of a dwarf mistletoe infection

== Government ==
- Device Master Record, a folder containing a technical description of a device controlled by regulating authorities (such as the US Food and Drug Administration)
- Discharge Monitoring Report, submission report to the United States Environmental Protection Agency
- Department of Main Roads (New South Wales), Australia
- Department of Main Roads (Queensland), Australia

== Media ==
- Dance Music Report, bi-weekly U.S. trade magazine
- The Des Moines Register, daily morning newspaper in Des Moines, Iowa
- DMR Books, small Chicago-based book publisher

== Technology ==
- Device Master Record, a compilation of all the instructions, drawings and other records that must be used to produce a product
- Differential Microwave Radiometer, an instrument on the Cosmic Background Explorer satellite
- Digital Media Renderer, a DLNA-compliant device used to stream and play content
- Digital mobile radio, open digital radio standard for professional mobile radio and amateur radio users
- Dual modular redundancy, redundancy back-up system
- IMAX Digital Media Remastering, a process re-rendering regular movies for display on IMAX screens

== People ==
- Dennis MacAlistair Ritchie (1941–2011), American computer scientist

== Other uses ==
- Dalmuir railway station, West Dunbartonshire, Scotland, by National Rail station code
- Designated marksman rifle, weapon used by a squad designated marksman in a United States Army's fireteam infantry squad
- Designated Member Review, where a committee designates one or more members of the committee to review a decision-making process or a protocol or procedure
- Direct market reseller, also known as an e-tailer, a company that sells directly to consumers online without operating storefront operations
- Distance medley relay, a track event consisting of 1,200, 400, 800, and 1,600-meter legs
- Divergent modes of religiosity, a theory of the growth and development of religions
