= Design review =

Product development milestone

A design review is a milestone within a product development process whereby a design is evaluated against its requirements in order to verify the outcomes of previous activities and identify issues before committing to—and, if need be, to re-prioritise—further work. The ultimate design review, if successful, therefore triggers the product launch or product release.

The conduct of design reviews is compulsory as part of design controls, when developing products in certain regulated contexts such as medical devices.

By definition, a review must include persons who are external to the design team.

== Contents of a design review ==
In order to evaluate a design against its requirements, a number of means may be considered, such as:

- Physical tests.
- Engineering simulations.
- Examinations (Walk-through).

== Timing of design reviews ==
Most formalised systems engineering processes recognise that the cost of correcting a fault increases as it progresses through the development process. Additional effort spent in the early stages of development to discover and correct errors is therefore likely to be worthwhile. Design reviews are example of such an effort. Therefore, a number of design reviews may be carried out, for example to evaluate the design against different sets of criteria (consistency, usability, ease of localisation, environmental) or during various stages of the design process.

== See also ==
- Design review (U.S. government)
- Hazard and operability study
