= DHF (disambiguation) =

A DHF is a design history file of a medical device.

DHF may also refer to:

== Biology and medicine ==
- Acute decompensated heart failure
- Diastolic heart failure
- Dihydrofolic acid
- Dengue hemorrhagic fever

== Other uses ==
- Danish Handball Federation (Danish: Dansk Håndbold Forbund)
- Al Dhafra Air Base, UAE (IATA:DHF)
