= United Space Alliance =

American spaceflight corporation (1995–2019)

- Type: Joint venture
- Industry: Space
- Founded: August 1995
- Defunct: 20 December 2019
- Headquarters: Houston, Texas, US
- Key people: Michael J. McCulley (CEO 2003–2007)
- Products: Spaceflight operations
- Revenue: US $2.0 billion (2005)
- Owner: Boeing and Lockheed Martin
- Number of employees: 8,800 (2008)
- Parent: Boeing (50%); Lockheed Martin (50%)

United Space Alliance (USA) was a spaceflight operations company. USA was established in August 1995 as joint venture of Rockwell International and Lockheed Martin, primarily to support operations of the Space Shuttle. The sale of Rockwell's aerospace and defense assets to Boeing in December 1996 made Boeing the co-owner along with Lockheed for the rest of the company's corporate existence. The company was headquartered in Houston, Texas and in 2008 employed approximately 8,800 people in Texas, Florida, Alabama, and the Washington, D.C. area. The company was dissolved on 20 December 2019

== History ==
United Space Alliance's original logo, used until 2008, featured the Space Shuttle orbiter

United Space Alliance was formed as a limited liability company as a joint venture between Rockwell International and Lockheed Martin in response to NASA's desire to consolidate many Space Shuttle program contracts to one prime contractor. USA and NASA signed the Space Flight Operations Contract (SFOC) in September 1996 to become the single prime contractor that NASA was seeking. USA supported the contract for 10 years through September 2006. This led to USA and NASA agreeing on October 2, 2006 to the Space Program Operations Contract (SPOC).

Until 2011, USA's major business was the operation and processing of NASA's Space Shuttle fleet and International Space Station at Lyndon B. Johnson Space Center and John F. Kennedy Space Center. This work was defined by the Space Program Operations Contract (SPOC) between NASA and USA. The contract ran from October 1, 2006 through September 30, 2010, which was to be the end of Space Shuttle operations. The contract included five one-year options that could extend the contract through Fiscal Year 2015. Efforts under the Space Program Operations Contract included work and support for mission design and planning; software development and integration; astronaut and flight controller training; system integration; flight operations; vehicle processing, launch and recovery; vehicle sustaining engineering; flight crew equipment processing; and Space Shuttle and International Space Station-related support to the Constellation Program. It was a cost reimbursement contract, with provisions for award and performance fees.

=== Search for role in the post-Shuttle era ===
With the planned end of the Space Shuttle program in 2011, USA sought new business opportunities through new government contracts for other NASA programs. One of those contracts was the 2008 Integrated Mission Operations Contract (IMOC) to provide flight operations support for the Constellation Program and International Space Station Program in Houston through September 30, 2011. Also, USA signed a 2008 subcontract with Alliant Techsystems for support of the Ares I launch vehicle.

The company also changed its corporate logo at this time to de-emphasize the soon-to-be-defunct Space Shuttle program and to rebrand it to be a space operations company, choosing to replace the shuttle in the "A" to be a sun rising over the earth.

In November 2010, United Space Alliance was selected by NASA for consideration for potential contract awards for heavy lift launch vehicle system concepts, and propulsion technologies.

=== Demise ===
The efforts of USA's management to identify new post-Shuttle business opportunities were ultimately not successful, and its owners Boeing and Lockheed Martin decided to wind down the joint venture. As of September 30, 2014, USA no longer held active contracts, and said that it would not pursue future contracts. However, USA announced that it would continue to operate in an administrative business capacity to manage government contract close-out requirements. Close-out of government contracts historically takes five to seven years.

On December 20, 2019, the company was dissolved.

== See also ==
- Top 100 Contractors of the U.S. federal government
- Deep Space Transport LLC
- United Launch Alliance
