= Device Master Record =

A Device Master Record (DMR) is a compilation of all the instructions, drawings and other records that must be used to produce a product. The term is used in Quality Management Systems that cover product design and production.

== Contents ==
The physical appearance of the DMR can be a binder with documents, a document that can refer to other documents, or the same concepts in a computer as documents in a database. Labels, Instructions for Use, drawings, Certificates of Conformity, and other documents might form part of a DMR. The following contents are listed in the relevant chapter of the CFR as part of the Device Master Record:

(a) Device specifications including appropriate drawings, composition, formulation, component specifications, and software specifications;

(b) Production process specifications including the appropriate equipment specifications, production methods, production procedures, and production environment specifications;

(c) Quality assurance procedures and specifications including acceptance criteria and the quality assurance equipment to be used;

(d) Packaging and labeling specifications, including methods and processes used; and

(e) Installation, maintenance, and servicing procedures and methods.

== Related documentation ==
One of the purposes of the Device Master Record is to separate the production process from the design process, that is covered in the Design Dossier or Design History File (DHF). After a product design department has updated their design documents, the design has to be transferred to a production scenario. For instance, if the product incorporates software, the software must be compiled and tested before it is given to the production department. Similarly, if a piece of plastic is used in the product, a plastic mould must be created before production can start. Once everything is ready for switching to making the new design, the device master record is updated.

All products that are produced according to such quality management systems can refer to a specific DMR that was used to produce it. The DMR will specify exactly what plastic moulds to use, what software builds to install etc. The production history is part of the Device History Record (DHR).

If an error is found in a product, the manufacturer may identify this problem to specific versions of the DMR, possibly using a CAPA, and may then choose to issue notices to customers for products, that have been built according to these versions of the DMR, or make a product recall.

== See also ==
- Device History Record (DHR)
- Design History File (DHF)
- The sub-clause 4.2.3 of ISO 13485:2016 requires a manufacturer of medical device to establish a Technical file, similar to a device master record.
- The EU medical device regulation requires a manufacturer of a medical device to maintain a Technical documentation.
