= Designated Member Review =

A Designated Member Review (DMR) or Designated Subcommittee Review (DSR), also known as a Designated Review, is a review of a protocol where a committee designates one or more members of the committee to review a decisionmaking process or a protocol or procedure, a review which would ordinarily require the full committee's review. Typically this pertains to IACUCs.

In protocols of the National Institutes of Health (NIH) in the United States, 'Correct Conduct of Full-Committee and Designated-Member Protocol Reviews', there are two ways a procedure or protocol can be reviewed, according to PHS policy.

Sometimes a protocol or amendment to policies is submitted, which may not need to be considered at a full meeting. If everyone on the committee agrees, then the chair or the committee can assign a person of knowledge and selected other member(s) to review the protocol and approve it or send it back to the full committee for discussion. A first step in such a process is for the chair to poll committee members to determine agreement for the DMR. If they agree, the DMR proceeds; if they do not agree, the DMR does not occur and it should be considered at a convened meeting by the complete committee.

The United States Public Health Service on Humane Care and Use of Laboratory Animals (PHS Policy, Reprinted October 2000), states that prior to review, each member of the IACUC must be given a list of proposed research projects to be considered. Any member of the IACUC can call for a full committee review of any of these projects.

The Policy then says that, “If full committee review is not requested, at least one member of the IACUC, designated by the chairperson and qualified to conduct the review, shall review those research projects and have the authority to approve, require modifications in (to secure approval) or request full committee review of those research projects. If full committee review is requested, approval of those research projects may be granted only after review at a convened meeting of a quorum of the IACUC and with the approval vote of a majority of the quorum present.”

and

Only two protocol review methods fulfill USDA and PHS requirements—full committee and designated member. The author attempts to lessen the confusion surrounding this issue by describing these methods, along with examples of faulty hybrids and convenient strategies to bring unacceptable methods into compliance.

Although the United States Public Health Service Policy on Humane Care and Use of Laboratory Animals (PHS Policy)1 has existed since 1986 and the United States Department of Agriculture’s (USDA) Animal Welfare Act2 regulations governing Institutional Animal Care and Use Committees (IACUCs) have been extant since 1989, continuing questions and misunderstandings exist regarding the procedures used for protocol review.

Contrasted with 'Full Committee Review' (FCR).

Declining a DMR Request

A request for a DMR can be declined by one or more IACUC members on the basis of reliability - that a DMR would compromise the reliability of the committee's conduct of its duties. This could relate to the appearance of a 'workaround' to evade the legal duty to rigorously explore the 3Rs before approving a protocol.

The Three Rs (3Rs) in relation to science are guiding principles for more ethical use of animals in testing. These were first described by W. M. S. Russell and R. L. Burch in 1959. The 3Rs are -

1. Replacement which refers to the preferred use of non-animal methods over animal methods whenever it is possible to achieve the same scientific aims.
2. Reduction which refers to methods that enable researchers to obtain comparable levels of information from fewer animals, or to obtain more information from the same number of animals.
3. Refinement which refers to methods that alleviate or minimize potential pain, suffering or distress, and enhance animal welfare for the animals used.

The 3Rs have a broader scope than simply encouraging alternatives to animal testing, but aim to improve animal welfare and scientific quality where the use of animals can not be avoided. In many countries, these 3Rs are now explicit in legislation governing animal use.

== Bibliography ==
- William Russell and Rex Burch (1959) The Principles of Humane Experimental Technique. London: Methuen. ISBN 978-0-900767-78-4 (paperback edition)

== See also ==
- Human subject research
- IACUC
- IRB
- Laboratory Animals
- National Institutes of Health (NIH) in the United States
- Three Rs (animal research)
- PHS Policy
