= Design review (U.S. government) =

Key technical evaluation in procurement processes

In the U.S. Department of Defense integrated acquisition lifecycle the technical section has multiple acquisition technical reviews. Technical reviews and audits assist the acquisition and the number and types are tailored to the acquisition. Overall guidance flows from the Defense Acquisition Guidebook chapter 4, with local details further defined by the review organizations. Typical topics examined include adequacy of program/contract metrics, proper staffing, risks, budget, and schedule.

In NASA's engineering design life cycle, design reviews are held for technical and programmatic accountability and to authorize the release of funding to a project. A design review provides an in-depth assessment by an independent team of discipline experts and managers that the design (or concept) is realistic and attainable from a programmatic and technical sense.

Design review is also required of medical device developers as part of a system of design controls described in the US Food and Drug Administration's governing regulations in 21CFR820. In 21CFR820.3(h), design review is described as "documented, comprehensive, systematic examination of the design to evaluate the adequacy of the design requirements, to evaluate the capability of the design to meet these requirements, and to identify problems". The FDA also specifies that a design review should include an independent reviewer.

== Review process ==
The list of reviews done by an effort and the content, nature, process, and objectives any review uses vary enormously by the organization involved and the particular situation of the effort. For example, even within the U.S. Department of Defense, system requirements review cases include, for example, (1) a 5-day perusal of each individual requirement, or (2) a 2-day discussion of development plan documents allowed only after the system requirements have been approved and the development documents reviewed with formal action items required, or (3) a half-day PowerPoint with content determined by the project manager with attendance limited to high-level (non-technical) stakeholders with no output other than the PM being able to claim "SRR done".

Some of the reviews that may be done on an effort include:

=== Mission concept review (MCR) ===
The MCR affirms the mission need and examines the proposed mission's objectives and the concept for meeting those objectives.

=== System requirements review (SRR) ===
The SRR examines the functional requirements and performance requirements defined for the system and the preliminary program or project plan and ensures that the requirements and the selected concept will satisfy the mission.

=== Mission definition review (MDR) ===
The MDR examines the proposed requirements, the mission architecture, and the flow down to all functional elements of the mission to ensure that the overall concept is complete, feasible, and consistent with available resources.

=== System design review (SDR) ===
The SDR examines the proposed system architecture and design and the flow down to all functional elements of the system.

=== Preliminary design review (PDR) ===
The PDR demonstrates that the preliminary design meets all system requirements with acceptable risk and within the cost and schedule constraints and establishes the basis for proceeding with detailed design. It will show that the correct design options have been selected, interfaces have been identified, and verification methods have been described.

The following are typical objectives of a PDR:

- Ensure that all system requirements have been validated, allocated, the requirements are complete, and the flowdown is adequate to verify system performance
- Show that the proposed design is expected to meet the functional and performance requirements
- Show sufficient maturity in the proposed design approach to proceed to final design
- Show that the design is verifiable and that the risks have been identified, characterized, and mitigated where appropriate.

=== Critical design review (CDR) ===
The CDR demonstrates that the maturity of the design is appropriate to support proceeding with full-scale fabrication, assembly, integration, and test. CDR determines that the technical effort is on track to complete the flight and ground system development and mission operations, meeting mission performance requirements within the identified cost and schedule constraints.

The following are typical objectives of a CDR:

- Ensure that the "build-to" baseline contains detailed hardware and software specifications that can meet functional and performance requirements
- Ensure that the design has been satisfactorily audited by production, verification, operations, and other specialty engineering organizations
- Ensure that the production processes and controls are sufficient to proceed to the fabrication stage
- Establish that planned quality assurance (QA) activities will establish perceptive verification and screening processes for producing a quality product
- Verify that the final design fulfills the specifications established at PDR.

=== Production readiness review (PRR) ===
A PRR is held for flight system and ground support projects developing or acquiring multiple or similar systems greater than three or as determined by the project. The PRR determines the readiness of the system developers to efficiently produce the required number of systems. It ensures that the production plans; fabrication, assembly, and integration enabling products; and personnel are in place and ready to begin production.

=== Test readiness review (TRR) ===
A TRR ensures that the test article (hardware/software), test facility, support personnel, and test procedures are ready for testing and data acquisition, reduction, and control. This is not a prerequisite for key decision point entry.

=== System acceptance review (SAR) ===
The SAR verifies the completeness of the specific end products in relation to their expected maturity level and assesses compliance to stakeholder expectations. The SAR examines the system, its end products and documentation, and test data and analyses that support verification. It also ensures that the system has sufficient technical maturity to authorize its shipment to the designated operational facility or launch site.

=== Operational readiness review (ORR) ===
The ORR examines the actual system characteristics and the procedures used in the system or end product's operation and ensures that all system and support (flight and ground) hardware, software, personnel, procedures, and user documentation accurately reflect the deployed state of the system.

The following are typical objectives of an ORR:

- Establish that the system is ready to transition into an operational mode through examination of available ground and flight test results, analyses, and operational demonstrations
- Confirm that the system is operationally and logistically supported in a satisfactory manner considering all modes of operation and support (normal, contingency, and unplanned)
- Establish that operational documentation is complete and represents the system configuration and its planned modes of operation
- Establish that the training function is in place and has demonstrated capability to support all aspects of system maintenance, preparation, operation, and recovery.

=== Flight readiness review (FRR) ===
The FRR examines tests, demonstrations, analyses, and audits that determine the system's readiness for a safe and successful flight or launch and for subsequent flight operations. It also ensures that all flight and ground hardware, software, personnel, and procedures are operationally ready.

The following are typical objectives of a FRR:

- Receive certification that flight operations can safely proceed with acceptable risk.
- Confirm that the system and support elements are properly configured and ready for launch.
- Establish that all interfaces are compatible and function as expected.
- Establish that the system state supports a launch "go" decision based on go/no-go criteria.

== See also ==
- Critical path method
- Engineering design process
- Systems Development Life Cycle
- Technical peer review
