= Design history file =

A design history file is a compilation of documentation that describes the design history of a finished medical device. The design history file, or DHF, is part of regulation introduced in 1990 when the U.S. Congress passed the Safe Medical Devices Act, which established new standards for medical devices that can cause or contribute to the death, serious illness, or injury of a patient. Prior to this legislation, U.S. Food and Drug Administration (FDA) auditors were limited to examining the production and quality control records of the device.

== Requirements ==
The regulation requires medical device manufacturers of Class II and Class III devices to implement design controls. These design controls consist of a development and control plan used to manage the development of a new product, and a design history file where these activities are documented. These controls are specifically intended to manage a medical device company's new product development activities. Research and development processes aimed at developing new underlying technologies are not subject to these regulations. The requirements for a DHF are documented in FDA Regulation CFR 21 820.

== Design controls ==
Each manufacturer of either a class II or class III medical device (as well as a select group of class I devices) needs to establish and document procedures on the design and design requirements. These design controls include:

- Design input - Design inputs are typically the initial requirements that describe the medical device to be produced.
- Design output - Design outputs are the results of the design and engineering efforts. These are normally the final specifications for the device. Including the manufacturing process and the in-coming, in-process and finished device inspection, measurement or test methods and criteria. The outputs are normally documented in models, drawings, engineering analysis and other documents. The output needs to be directly traceable to the input requirements. Design verification and validation should demonstrate that the final output specifications conform to the input requirements and meet user needs and intended uses.
- Design review - The design review is a formal review of the medical device design by representatives of each design function participating in the design efforts as well as other interested parties (e.g. marketing, sales, manufacturing engineering, etc.). The design review must be documented in the DHF and include review date, participants, design version/revision reviewed and review results.
- Design verification - Design verification is the process that confirms that the design output conforms to the design input. Design verification should demonstrate that the specifications are the correct specifications for the design. Design verification must be documented in the DHF and include the verification date, participants, design version/revision verified, verification method and verification results.
- Process validation - Process validation is the process in which the device design is validated using initial/low volume production processes. The purpose for the process validation is to confirm that the design functions according to design inputs when produced using normal production processes rather than prototype processes. The process validation must be documented in the DHF.
- Design validation. Each manufacturer shall establish and maintain procedures for validating the device design. Design validation shall be performed under defined operating conditions on initial production units, lots, or batches, or their equivalents. Design validation shall ensure that devices conform to defined user needs and intended uses and shall include testing of production units under actual or simulated use conditions. Design validation shall include software validation and risk analysis, where appropriate. The results of the design validation, including identification of the design, method(s), the date, and the individual(s) performing the validation, shall be documented in the DHF.
- Design transfer - Design transfer is the process in which the device design is translated into production, distribution, and installation specifications.
- Design changes - Design changes is the process in which the design changes are identified and documented. Also known as engineering change or enterprise change.
- Design history file - The DHF is a formal document that is prepared for each medical device. The DHF can be either a collection of the actual documents generated in the product development (PD) process or an index of documents and their storage location.

== Design and development files ==
The sub-clause 7.3.10 of ISO 13485:2016 requires a manufacturer of a medical device to maintain (and control) a design and development file for a medical device to document the design history of a medical device. This file shall also contain records for changes in design and development (per device type or family). It might contain e.g. a design and development plan, or test reports; and is thus comparable to the DHF of the FDA regulations. Similarly, Annex II §3.1 of the EU medical device regulation asks for information to allow the design stages applied to the device to be understood to be part of the Technical documentation.

== See also ==
- Device Master Record
- Medical equipment management
- Technical file
