= Independent reviewer =

An independent reviewer is an individual or organization who does not have direct professional responsibility for the design stage under review, assuring an independent and objective review. Within the context of formal design reviews, the practical solution is simply to ensure a fresh perspective, based on the principle that those who are too close to the design may overlook design errors. Thus, reviewers should not have been significantly involved in the activities under review.

== US Food and Drug Administration ==
The US Food and Drug Administration requires that developers of medical device follow a system of design controls. A key part of this system is design review, defined in 21CFR820.3 section (h) as "a documented, comprehensive, systematic examination of the design to evaluate the adequacy of the design requirements, to evaluate the capability of the design to meet these requirements, and to identify problems."

In section (e), it is stated that an independent reviewer is required for any design review. An independent reviewer is an individual who does not have direct professional responsibility for the design stage under review, assuring an independent and objective review. Within the context of formal design reviews, the practical solution is simply to ensure a fresh perspective, based on the principle that those who are too close to the design may overlook design errors. Thus, reviewers should not have been significantly involved in the activities under review.

== UK Anti-terrorism law ==
The purpose of an independent reviewer in anti-terrorism legislation is much the same as in any design process; to ensure that those working on the project have not blinded themselves to its faults, however, the independent reviewer also ensures that the legislation does not fall foul of anti-discrimination legislation and cause conflict in the law.

== See also ==
- Scholarly peer review
- Redundancy (systems theory)
