= ISO 14971 =

ISO standard

ISO 14971 Medical devices — Application of risk management to medical devices is a voluntary consensus standard, published by International Organization for Standardization (ISO) for the first time in 1998, and specifies terminology, principles, and a process for risk management of medical devices.

The current ISO 14971 edition was published in December 2019.

== Background ==
The ISO Technical Committee responsible for the maintenance of this standard is ISO/ TC 210 working with IEC/SC62A through Joint Working Group one (JWG1). This standard is the culmination of the work starting in ISO/IEC Guide 51, and ISO/IEC Guide 63. The third edition of ISO 14971 was published in December 2019 and supersedes the second edition of ISO 14971.

Specifically, ISO 14971 is a nine-part standard which first establishes a framework for risk analysis, evaluation, control, and review, and also specifies a procedure for review and monitoring during production and post-production.

ISO 14971:2012 was harmonized with respect to the three European Directives associated with medical devices through the three 'Zed' Annexes (ZA, ZB & ZC). The Annex ZA harmonized ISO 14971:2012 with the Medical Devices Directive 93/42/EEC of 1993. The Annex ZB harmonized ISO 14971:2012 with the Active Implantable Medical Device Directive 90/385/EEC of 1990. The Annex ZC harmonized ISO 14971:2012 with the In-vitro Diagnostic Medical Device Directive 98/79/EC of 1998.

The 2021 addendum to ISO 14971 (ISO 14971:2019+A11:2021) was published to harmonize ISO 14971 and two European Regulations associated with medical devices through the two 'Zed' Annexes (ZA & ZB). The Annex ZA harmonized ISO 14971 with the European Union's Medical Device Regulation (2017/745) of 2017. The Annex ZB harmonized ISO 14971 with the European Union's Medical Device Regulation (2017/746) of 2017.

== Guidance Documents ==
ISO/TR 24971 was published in 2013 by the ISO TC 210 technical committee to provide expert guidance on the application of this standard. The second edition of ISO 24971 was published in 2020 and contains some of the informative annexes from the second edition of ISO 14971.

== ISO 14971 risk management options ==
=== Inherent safety by design ===
For example:

- Use specific connectors that cannot be connected to the wrong component.
- Remove features that can be mistakenly selected or eliminate an interaction when it could lead to use error.
- Improve the detectability or readability of controls, labels, and displays.
- Automate device functions that are prone to use error when users perform the task manually.

=== Protective measures in the medical device itself or in the manufacturing process ===
For example:

- Incorporate safety mechanisms such as physical safety guards, shielded elements, or software or hardware interlocks.
- Include warning screens to advise the user of essential conditions that should exist prior to proceeding with device use, such as specific data entry.
- Use alerts for hazardous conditions, such as a “low battery” alert when an unexpected loss of the device’s operation could cause harm or death.
- Use device technologies that require less maintenance or are “maintenance free.”

=== Information for safety ===
For example:

- Provide written information, such as warning or caution statements in the user manual that highlight and clearly discuss the use-related hazard.
- Train users to avoid the use error.

== Changes in the ISO 14971:2019 edition ==
The third edition of the standard from 2019 differs from 14971:2007 not only by a new chapter structure, but also by focus on the benefit-risk ratio. For this, the concept of (medical) benefit is now defined. In addition, there is a stronger focus on the "information from the production and the downstream phases". Some explanations or appendices from the previous edition are outsourced in ISO / TR 24971:2019.

== History ==
Year	Description
1997	EN 1441 was born in Europe from European Committee for Standardization (CEN) with the title "Medical devices - Risk analysis." Which will be the basis for developing ISO 14971
1998	ISO 14971-1
2000	ISO 14971 (1st Edition)
2007	ISO 14971 (2nd Edition)
2012	EN ISO 14971 the European Committee for Standardization (CEN) publishes the harmonized European version with respect to the three European directives associated with the medical sector 93/42/EEC, 98/79/EC, 90/385/EEC
2019	ISO 14971 (3rd Edition) also published simultaneously in Europe as EN ISO 14971: 2019
2021	EN ISO 14971 the European Committee for Standardization (CEN) publishes the harmonized European version with respect to the two European Regulations associated with the medical sector 2017/745 and 2017/746

== See also ==
- List of ISO standards
- ISO 13485
- Medical technology
- Medical device
- Medical Devices Directive
- Clinical Engineering
- ISO 690
