= System design review =

A system design review (SDR) is a scheduled review of many government-contractor relations, which ensures continuous involvement throughout a program. The SDR was originally defined in the Air Force's MIL-STD-1521.

The SDR is a technical review conducted to evaluate the manner in which a project's system requirements have been allocated to configuration items, manufacturing considerations, next phase planning, production plans, and the engineering process that produced the allocation. This review is conducted when the system definition is at a point where system characteristics and configuration items are defined. A successful SDR establishes a functional baseline.

The MIL-STD-1521 was cancelled in 1995 without replacement for the SDR material. Since that time, the DoD 5000 system has been created which uses technical reviews as described in chapter 4 of the Defense Acquisition Guide discussions on their role or shown in the diagram of the integrated defense acquisition, technology and kogistics life cycle management framework wallchart. There is no identical replacement for the previous SDR, but the system functional review (SFR) is similar.

== See also ==
- Design review (U.S. government)
- Functional requirement
