= Strategic Defence Review =

Strategic Defence Review may refer to several different British policy documents:

- Strategic Defence Review (1998)
- Strategic Defence and Security Review 2010
- Strategic Defence and Security Review 2015
- Strategic Defence Review (2025)

== See also ==
- Defence Review, the overall topic of the process of reviewing the defence policy of the United Kingdom
