= Deep Space Transport LLC =

Boeing-Northrop Grumman consortium for Moon rocket construction

Deep Space Transport LLC is a joint venture that is set to provide launch services for the Space Launch System rocket. The joint venture consists of Boeing, the prime contractor for the Space Launch System core stage and Northrop Grumman, the prime contractor for the Space Launch System's solid rocket boosters. It will hopefully achieve significant cost savings by shifting procurement of future Space Launch System rockets to a commercial services contract. Deep Space Transport LLC would be responsible for producing hardware and services for up to 10 Artemis launches beginning with the Artemis V mission, and up to 10 launches for other NASA missions. NASA expects to procure at least one flight per year to the Moon or other deep-space destinations.

== Skepticism ==
In a report issued in October, 2023, NASA’s Office of Inspector General expressed skepticism that shifting procurement to a commercial services contract would achieve significant cost savings.

== See also ==
- United Space Alliance, a similar entity for streamlining Space Shuttle contracts that operated from September 1996 (partnership between Rockwell International and Lockheed Martin)
- United Launch Alliance, a joint venture between Boeing and Lockheed Martin to operate launch vehicles
