= Institutional Animal Care and Use Committee =

Bodies overseeing animal research

Institutional Animal Care and Use Committees (IACUCs) are centrally important in applying laws about animal research in the United States. Similar systems operate in other countries, but generally under different titles; for example, in Canada a typical title would be the University Animal Care Committee (UACC), while in the United Kingdom it would be the Animal Welfare and Ethical Review Body (AWERB).

Most research involving laboratory animals in the United States is funded by the United States National Institutes of Health or, to lesser extents, other federal agencies. The NIH Office of Laboratory Animal Welfare (OLAW) has been directed by law to develop policies that describe the role of Institutional Animal Care and Use Committees. Every institution that uses certain animals for federally funded laboratory research must have an Institutional Animal Care and Use Committee (IACUC). Each local IACUC reviews research protocols and conducts evaluations of the institution's animal care and use, which includes the results of inspections of facilities that are required by law.

The corresponding, parallel, and equivalent local ethical body responsible for overseeing U.S. federally funded research involving humans is the Institutional Review Board (IRB).

== History ==
The history of IACUCs evolved from the history of regulation of animal welfare in the USA. Prior to 1963, regulation was conducted solely by investigators, and research laboratories had inconsistent animal care policies and standards of care. A group of veterinarians formed the Animal Care Panel and began work in 1961, and in 1963 they published the first edition of The Guide for the Care and Use of Laboratory Animals, referred to hereafter as the Guide. Subsequent editions of the Guide were supported by NIH and published by the Institute of Laboratory Animal Research branch of the National Academy of Science. Currently, the Guide is in its eighth edition.

An accreditation committee was formed in 1963, and it was independently incorporated from the ACP. Its name was AAALAC, the American Association for the Accreditation of Laboratory Animal Care. In 1996 this committee changed its name to the "Association for the Assessment and Accreditation of Laboratory Animal Care International (AAALAC)".

A series of reports on poor animal welfare in the US led to a major article in Life magazine in 1966. Public opinion was particularly galvanized by the case of a pet dog that was stolen from her owners in Pennsylvania and later died during an experimental surgery at a hospital in New York. Thus catalyzed, and spurred by the efforts of Representative Joseph Y. Resnick, Congress created the Animal Welfare Act of 1966, which named the USDA the responsible agency. It inspected animal use facilities, but did not inspect or regulate individual laboratories.

In 1971, the Animal Welfare Act was revised, and compliance by institutions could be achieved through an animal care committee or via AAALAC accreditation. Compliance required adhering to the Guide, the Animal Welfare Act, and an additional set of "Principles for the Use of Laboratory Animals." In 1979, U.S. Public Health Service (PHS) policy took over, requiring an animal care committee for each animal-using grantee institution and expanding the species covered to include all vertebrates. The animal care committee was required to have five members with expertise to regulate animal welfare at that institution, including at least one veterinarian.

The term IACUC was formally introduced in 1986 with an amendment to the Animal Welfare Act and corresponding changes in PHS policy. Although much of the animal welfare law comes from the Animal Welfare Act, which is enforced by the USDA, the full set of regulations over IACUCs comes from PHS Policy. Twice-yearly inspections of animal use facilities were mandated. The modern composition of IACUCs was thus established.

== Composition ==
The IACUC must have a minimum of three members, appointed by the chief executive officer of the research facility. The appointed members must be qualified to regulate animal care at that institution. Membership requirements, as defined in 9 CFR §2.31, are as follows:

1. The committee shall be composed of a Chairman and at least two other members.
2. One of these members must be a Doctor of Veterinary Medicine with training or experience related to laboratory animal research
3. One member must have no relation with the institution except for serving on the IACUC.

Additionally, if the committee consists of more than three members, more than three members can not be from the same administrative unit of the facility.

== Activities ==
Each local IACUC reviews research protocols and conducts evaluations of the institution's animal care. The evaluations include inspections of all animal use facilities every six months. The IACUC reports to the NIH Office of Laboratory Animal Welfare (OLAW) annually, and is issued an animal welfare assurance number by OLAW without which no federally funded use of animals in research may occur. The IACUC is required to report significant noncompliance with animal use protocols to OLAW, as well as IACUC actions taken to correct the noncompliance.

=== Protocol review ===
Each animal use protocol (AUP) must be reviewed by full IACUC committee at least once every three years, and can be reviewed more frequently if the committee wishes. The protocol must cover at least these points:

a. Identification of the species and approximate number of animals to be used.
b. Rationale for involving animals, and for the appropriateness of the species and numbers used.
c. A complete description of the proposed use of the animals.
d. A description of procedures designed to assure that discomfort and injury to animals will be limited to that which is unavoidable in the conduct of scientifically valuable research, and that analgesic, anesthetic, and tranquilizing drugs will be used where indicated and appropriate to minimize discomfort and pain to animals.
e. A description of any euthanasia method to be used.

In review, the IACUC is required to ensure that the proposed work falls within the OLAW Animal Welfare Assurance, and that the following points are covered:

a. Procedures with animals will avoid or minimize discomfort, distress, and pain to the animals, consistent with sound research design.
b. Procedures that may cause more than momentary or slight pain or distress to the animals will be performed with appropriate sedation, analgesia, or anesthesia, unless the procedure is justified for scientific reasons in writing by the investigator.
c. Animals that would otherwise experience severe or chronic pain or distress that cannot be relieved will be painlessly killed at the end of the procedure or, if appropriate, during the procedure.
d. The living conditions of animals will be appropriate for their species and contribute to their health and comfort. The housing, feeding, and nonmedical care of the animals will be directed by a veterinarian or other scientist trained and experienced in the proper care, handling, and use of the species being maintained or studied.
e. Medical care for animals will be available and provided as necessary by a qualified veterinarian.
f. Personnel conducting procedures on the species being maintained or studied will be appropriately qualified and trained in those procedures.
g. Methods of euthanasia used will be consistent with the recommendations of the American Veterinary Medical Association (AVMA) Panel on Euthanasia (PDF), unless a deviation is justified for scientific reasons in writing by the investigator.

=== Whistleblowing policies ===
Institutional Animal Care and Use Committees must have a way to correct problems in animal care, including fair treatment of whistleblowers who report animal welfare violations involving USDA species.

== Inspections ==
The actions of the IACUCs are subject to inspection by multiple agencies. PHS staff and advisors may inspect any PHS awardee at any time to verify adherence to PHS policy. The APHIS branch of the USDA conducts surprise inspections of institutions that use species covered by the Animal Welfare Act up to every six months. These inspections verify compliance with the Animal Welfare Act, which is a subset of the PHS policies governing IACUCs. AAALAC inspects facilities for accreditation at least every three years. Accreditation also requires an annual report to AAALAC.

== Reliability ==
The central importance of Institutional Animal Care and Use Committees means that animal care and use is fundamentally dependent on the application of the Guide for the Care and Use of Laboratory Animals regulations by an institution's committee. It has been suggested that one measure of the success of the IACUC system is the reliability of protocol approvals between institutions. In other words, would a protocol for animal use, approved by the IACUC at one institution, be approved at another institution? This question was addressed specifically by researchers Plous and Herzog in 2001: They concluded that, regardless of whether the research involved terminal or painful procedures, IACUC protocol reviews did not exceed chance levels of intercommittee agreement.

The Plous and Herzog work was criticized by some in the animal research community as drawing invalid conclusions because IACUCs rely on knowing the experience of the investigators and staff. The Plous and Herzog study compared responses of in-house IACUCs, who knew the investigators and staff, with blinded IACUCs, who did not know the investigators and staff. The blinded IACUCs did not necessarily have expertise in the species or procedures under consideration, or with the forms used to submit the protocol, and most of the lack of agreement between the non-blinded and blinded IACUC ratings took the form of requests for more information. In response, Plous and Herzog pointed out that the absence of reliability did not vary by animal species; that 17 protocols were categorically disapproved by the second committee despite 16 of them being approved by the first committee; and that if reliable judgments can only be made when the reviewers know the researcher or use certain protocol forms, the protocol review process should be reexamined.

A September 2005 audit report issued by the Office of Inspector General for the United States Department of Agriculture also spelled out problems with the reliability of IACUC oversight. The document described failure of some IACUCs to effectively review protocols and ensure compliance with federal animal welfare laws:

Some IACUCs are not effectively monitoring animal care activities, protocols, or alternative research methods. This situation exists because (1) the IACUCs are only required to conduct facility reviews on a semiannual basis, (2) IACUCs experience a high turnover rate, and (3) some members are not properly trained. In very few cases, the facilities are resistant to change, showing a general disregard for APHIS regulations. As a result, the facilities are not conducting research in compliance with the AWA or, in some cases, not providing humane conditions for research animals.

== Notes ==
1. For example, at McGill University
2. For example at the University of Cambridge
3. Online resources of the NIH Office of Laboratory Animal Welfare. tutorial
4. Animal Welfare Act
5. Historical review of animal care regulation, USDA Perspective on Environmental Enrichment for Animals by Jodie A. Kulpa-Eddy, Sylvia Taylor and Kristina M. Adams in ILAR Journal (2005) Volume 46(2).
6. Website of the Association for Assessment and Accreditation of Laboratory Animal Care.
7. Guide for the Care and Use of Laboratory Animals
8. Government principles for the utilization and care of vertebrate animals used in testing, research, and training
9. Online USDA inspection reports
10. USDA Inspector General Audit Report of APHIS Animal Care Program Inspection and Enforcement Activities, Report No. 33002-3-SF, September 2005
