= Design controls =

Application of a formal methodology, often legally mandated, to product development

Design controls are the application of a formal methodology to the conduct of product development activities. It is often mandatory (by regulation) to implement such practice when designing and developing products within regulated industries (e.g. medical devices).

== Medical devices ==
Since 1990, the Food and Drug Administration (FDA) has required that medical device manufacturers that want to market certain categories of medical devices in the USA follow Design Control requirements (21 CFR 820.30). At a high level, this regulation requires:

- Design and development planning
- Design input, including intended use and user needs (also known as customer attributes)
- Design output, including evaluation of conformance to design input requirements through:
  - Design verification confirming that the design output meets the design input requirements ("did we design the device right?")
  - Design validation ensuring that the devices conform to defined user needs and intended uses ("did we design the right device?")
- Design review
- Design transfer ensuring that the device design is correctly translated into production specifications
- Design changes
- Design history file, a demonstration that the design was developed according to the approved design plan and 21 CFR 820.30.

The Medical Devices Regulation (MDR (EU) 2017/745), replacing the MDD from 2021, requires information to allow the design stages applied to the device to be understood as part of the design and manufacturing information of a technical documentation for a medical device.

ISO 13485 is a voluntary standard that contains section 7.3 Design and Development recommending which procedures should be put in place by manufacturers in order to have a quality system that will comply with either the IVDR or the MDR.

The objective of Design Controls, in this context, is to require that manufacturers follow a methodologically-sound process to develop a medical device, with the intent of improving the probability that the device will reach an acceptable level of efficacy and safety.

== Design input ==
Examples of design input:

| Device functions | Human factors |
|---|---|
| Physical characteristics | Labeling & packaging |
| Performance | Maintenance |
| Safety | Sterilization |
| Reliability | Compatibility |
| Performance standards | Environmental limits |
| Regulatory requirements | |

== References and external links ==
- 21 CFR 820.30 on the FDA website
- European Medical Device Regulation (EU) 2017/745 (MDR)
- European In-Vitro Device Regulation (EU) 2017/746 (IVDR)
