= ISO 13485 =

ISO standard

ISO 13485 Medical devices -- Quality management systems -- Requirements for regulatory purposes is a voluntary standard, published by International Organization for Standardization (ISO) for the first time in 1996, and contains a comprehensive quality management system for the design and manufacture of medical devices. The latest version of this standard supersedes earlier documents such as EN 46001 (1993 and 1996) and EN 46002 (1996), the previously published ISO 13485 (1996 and 2003), and ISO 13488 (also 1996).

The current ISO 13485 edition was published on 1 March 2016 and reviewed and confirmed by ISO in 2025.

== Background ==
ISO 13485 is intended for organizations involved in the design, production, installation, and maintenance of medical devices. The standard can also be applied by suppliers and external parties providing products or services to medical device organizations.

Certification to ISO 13485 is voluntary and is not required by the standard itself. Organizations may choose to undergo third-party certification to demonstrate conformity with its requirements.

== Reason for use ==
While it remains a stand-alone document, ISO 13485 is generally harmonized with ISO 9001. A principal difference, however, is that ISO 9001 requires the organization to demonstrate continual improvement, whereas ISO 13485 requires only that the certified organization demonstrate the quality system is effectively implemented and maintained. Additionally, the ISO 9001 requirements regarding customer satisfaction are absent from the medical device standard.

ISO 13485 places specific emphasis on resource and environment management, tailored to the medical device and software sectors. For example, the standard requires organizations to ensure that their personnel are not only qualified but also adequately trained to understand and implement regulatory requirements. Moreover, the infrastructure and work environment must support compliance and safety. In software engineering for medical devices, this extends to maintaining cybersecurity measures and ensuring a development environment free from potential risks to data integrity or software reliability.

Other specific differences include:

- the promotion and awareness of regulatory requirements as a management responsibility. Examples of market-specific regulatory requirements include 21 CFR 820, the Quality System Regulation for medical devices sold in the United States, enforced by the U.S. Food and Drug Administration (FDA), or the Medical Device Regulation (EU) 2017/745 (MDR), required for doing business in the European Union
- controls in the work environment to ensure product safety
- focus on risk management activities and design control activities during product development
- specific requirements for inspection and traceability for implantable devices
- specific requirements for documentation and validation of processes for sterile medical devices, including controls relevant to sterile processing, packaging, and sterilization
- specific requirements for verification of the effectiveness of corrective and preventive actions
- specific requirements for cleanliness of products

In the European Union, Regulation (UE) 2017/745 on medical devices (MDR) has applied since 26 May 2021, while Regulation (UE) 2017/746 on in vitro diagnostic medical devices (IVDR) has applied since 26 May 2022, subject to transitional provisions.

The European standard EN ISO 13485:2016, together with corrigendum AC:2018 and amendment A11:2021, is cited as harmonised standard in support of both regulations. The use of harmonised standards is voluntary.

One of the major requirements to prove conformity is the implementation of the Quality Management System according ISO 9001 and/or ISO 13485 and ISO 14971. Although the European Union Directives do not mandate certification to ISO 9001 and/or ISO 13485 the preferred method to prove compliance to such standards is to seek its official certification which is issued by certifying organizations known as "Registrars". Several registrars also act as Notified Bodies.

For those medical devices requiring the pre-market involvement of a Notified Body, the result of a positive assessment from the Notified Body is the certificate of conformity allowing the CE mark and the permission to sell the medical device in the European Union. An assessment of the company Quality Management System by the Notified Body, together with the review of the required Technical Documentation, is taken into account to issue the certificate of conformity to the company product(s).

This standard adopted by CEN as EN ISO 13485:2003/AC:2007 is harmonized with respect to the European medical device regulations (MDR & IVDR).

ISO 13485 is now considered to be inline standard and requirement for medical devices even with "Global Harmonization Task Force Guidelines" (GHTF). The GHTF guidelines are slowly becoming universal standards for design, manufacture, export and sales of various medical devices. The GHTF has been replaced in the last few years by the International Medical Device Regulators Forum (IMDRF) and is structured differently from the GHTF as only the regulators, that are primary members of the group, get to make many of the decisions. The IMDRF main membership (the regulators) do want to have non-regulators involved without voting rights and in this way they are hoping to get the process and documents completed quicker than under the GHTF system (regulators & non-regulators were equal in voting rights) that worked reasonably well, but somewhat slow.

This standard adopted by CEN as EN ISO 13485:2016 is harmonized with respect to the European Medical Device Regulation.

Mexico published on October 11, 2012, a national standard as a Norma Oficial Mexicana (NOM) to control manufacture of medical devices inside the country. NOM-241-SSA1-2012, Buenas Practicas de Fabricación para Establecimientos dedicados a la Fabricación de Dispositivos Médicos. The scope of application is mandatory in the national territory, for all establishments dedicated to the process of medical devices marketed in the country. The Cofepris is the body assigned to its control, verification and to grant the records of compliance to the companies that implement this Standard of Good Manufacturing Practices. This standard is partially in line with ISO 13485: 2003 and ISO 9001: 2008.

In 2017, The Farmacopea de los Estados Unidos Mexicanos (United Mexican States Pharmacopoeia), medical industrial sectors and Cofepris are working together for updating NOM-241 Standard, putting special attention on managing risks during manufacture and regulating by manufacturing lines some of the most important medical devices manufacturing processes. This standard will be published in August 2018, and 180 days after publication it will become mandatory for the industry.

In Spain, medical devices are named in ISO-13485 as "Sanitary Products" as Castellano-language translation of ISO-13485, but in Mexico they are known as "Medical Devices" and correspond to those used in medical practice and that meet the definition established by NOM-241 as: Medical device, to the substance, mixture of substances, material, apparatus or instrument (including the computer program necessary for its proper use or application), used alone or in combination in the diagnosis, monitoring or prevention of human or auxiliary diseases in the treatment of the same and of the disability, as well as the employees in the replacement, correction, restoration or modification of the anatomy or human physiological processes. Medical devices include products of the following categories: medical equipment, prostheses, orthotics, functional aids, diagnostic agents, supplies for dental use, surgical, healing and hygiene products. ISO 13485:2016 Certificates meets the requirement of IEC 60601-2-25 : 1993 + A1: 1999 safety of Electrocardiograms.

== Chronology ==
Year	Description
1993	EN 46001 Quality systems – Medical devices – Particular requirements for the application of EN ISO 9001 is published by the European Committee for Standardization (CEN), forming the basis for developing ISO 13485.
1996	ISO 13485 (1st Edition).
2000	EN ISO 13485 is published by CEN, creating a European Norm version of the international standard, and the previous European standard (EN 46001) is withdrawn.
2003	ISO 13485 (2nd Edition).
2012	EN ISO 13485 is revised so that it harmonizes with the three European directives associated with the medical sector: 93/42/EEC (medical devices), 98/79/EC (in vitro diagnostic medical devices), and 90/385/EEC (active implantable medical devices).
2016	ISO 13485 (3rd Edition).

== See also ==
- ISO 14971
- Good manufacturing practice
- List of International Organization for Standardization standards
