= Medical logistics =

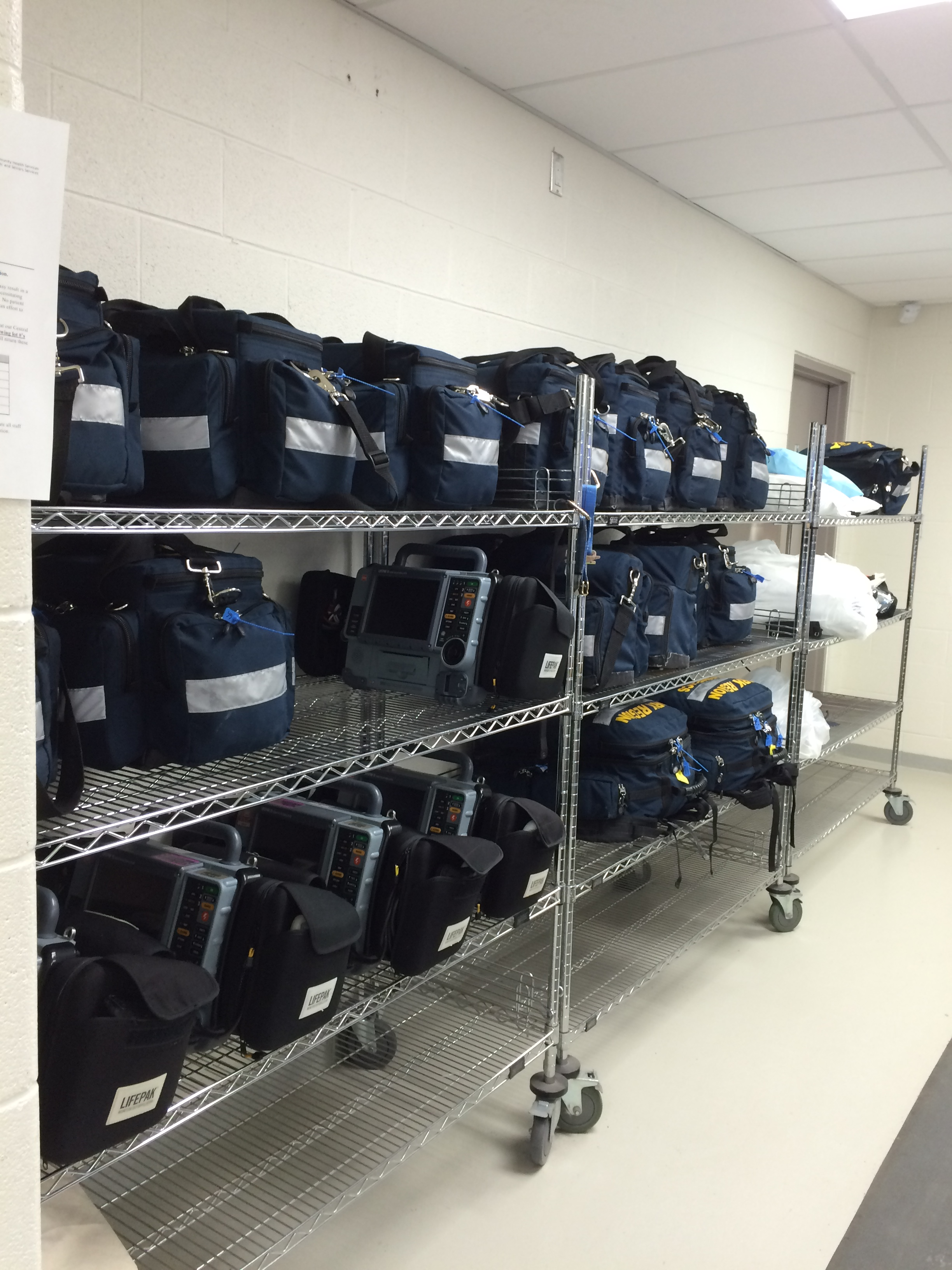
Bags of medical supplies and defibrillators at the York Region EMS Logistics Headquarters in Ontario, Canada

Medical logistics is the logistics of pharmaceuticals, medical and surgical supplies, medical devices and equipment, and other products needed to support doctors, nurses, and other health and dental care providers. Because its final customers are responsible for the lives and health of their patients, medical logistics is unique in that it seeks to optimize effectiveness rather than efficiency.

Medical logistics functions comprise an important part of the health care system: after staff costs, medical supplies are the single most expensive component of health care. To drive costs out of the health-care sector, medical logistics providers are adopting supply chain management theories.

This organizational chart is as follows and separated into three key areas.

- Medical Materiel
- Facilities Management.
- Biomedical Engineering (BMET) or Clinical Engineering

These areas are managed by a qualified Director of Logistics. The Director of Logistics' educational background holds some type of accredited graduate degree (MBA or M.S.)

== See also ==
- Medical device
