= Daci =

Daci may refer to:

- Nexhat Daci (1944–2026), Kosovan politician
- Dacians, ancient Indo-European people who lived roughly in the territory of modern Romania and surrounding neighbors
- DACI, a Direct Acoustic Cochlear Implant
- DACI, a responsibility assignment matrix consisting of four roles; Driver, Approver, Contributor and Informed
