= In Vitro Diagnostic Medical Devices Regulation =

European Union medical regulation

Regulation
- European Union regulation
- Title: Regulation (EU) 2017/746 of the European Parliament and of the Council of 5 April 2017 on in vitro diagnostic medical devices and repealing Directive 98/79/EC and Commission Decision 2010/227/EU (Text with EEA relevance. )
- Journal reference: [32017R0746 OJ L 117, 5.5.2017, p. 176–332]

History
- Date made: 5 April 2017

Other legislation
- Replaces: Directive 98/79/EC regarding in vitro diagnostic medical devices

Regulation (EU) 2017/746 (IVDR) is a regulation of the European Union on the placing on the market and putting into service of in vitro diagnostic medical devices (IVD), repealing Directive 98/79/EC (IVDD), which also concerned IVD. The regulation was published in April 2017 and is closely aligned to the EU regulation on medical devices. Changes compared to the IVDD include changes in device classification, stricter oversight of manufacturers by Notified Bodies, introduction of the "Person Responsible for Regulatory Compliance" (PRRC), the requirement of UDI marking for devices, common specifications, EUDAMED registration, and increased post-market surveillance activities.

== Classification ==
The regulation introduces, in §47, the classification of IVD in the risk classes A, B, C, and D. There are seven classification rules that are given in Annex VIII. MDCG guidance 2020-16 provides clarification of the classification rules and gives classification examples. Only devices in the lowest risk class, class A, are excluded from the requirement of notified body oversight.

== Transition ==
The provisions for the transition from IVDD to IVDR were changed by the EU commission with Regulation (EU) 2022/112 and Regulation (EU) 2023/607. Due to certain issues and delays, some changes to the transition timelines were implemented for both MDR and IVDR. Notably, the "sell-off" provision of legacy devices, covered by the IVDD, was removed.

== See also ==
- The Medical Devices Regulation (MDR (EU) 2017/745)
