= Global Harmonization Task Force =

The Global Harmonization Task Force (GHTF) was “a voluntary group of representatives from national medical device regulatory authorities (such as the U.S. Food and Drug Administration (FDA)) and the members of the medical device industry” whose goal was the standardization of medical device regulation across the world. The representatives from its five founding members (the European Union, the United States, Canada, Japan and Australia) were divided into three geographical areas: Europe, Asia-Pacific and North America, each of which actively regulates medical devices using their own unique regulatory framework. Founded in 1992, the GHTF was created in “an effort to respond to the growing need for international harmonization in the regulation of medical devices."

The GHTF disbanded late in 2012. Its mission has been taken over by the International Medical Device Regulators Forum (IMDRF), a successor organization composed of officials from regulatory agencies— not industry — around the world. The GHTF website is no longer operational.

== Mission statement ==
As quoted from the GHTF site now (IMDRF), “The purpose of the GHTF is to encourage the convergence in regulatory practices related to ensuring the safety, effectiveness/performance and quality of medical devices, promoting technological innovation and facilitating international trade, and the primary way in which this is accomplished is via the publication and dissemination of harmonized guidance documents on basic regulatory practices. These documents, which are developed by four different GHTF Study Groups, can then be adopted/implemented by member national regulatory authorities.

The GHTF also serves as an information exchange forum through which countries with medical device regulatory systems under development can benefit from the experience of those with existing systems and/or pattern their practices upon those of GHTF Founding Members.”

Stated succinctly, the organization aims to standardize medical device regulations around the world by exchange of information.

== Membership ==
=== Founding members ===
The founding members consist of regulatory authorities or industry members from the EU, the United States, Japan, Australia and Canada because of their well established and high standards in medical device regulations. Members also participate in the steering committee, which can recommend the inclusion of other participants in Study Groups to be a part of all GHTF activities.

=== Participating members ===
Participating members consist of representatives from regulatory agencies or medical device trade associations not a part of the founding members. Participating members are to facilitate the adoption of as much of the GHTF's policies in their region/agency as possible within legal parameters. Participating members can also take part in Study Groups as well as other expert working groups.

=== Liaison bodies ===
Liaison bodies are public health organizations, international standard-setting bodies or other groups who can contribute to or benefit from participation in GHTF. Liaison Bodies are encouraged to promote GHTF guidelines to their members and incorporate them into their work. Liaison bodies are permitted to nominate observers for GHTF Study Groups and other expert working groups.

=== Observers ===
Observers must be nominated by members and approved by the Study Group Chair. The level of participation that an Observer is granted is also decided by the Study Group Chair.

== Operating structure ==
=== Steering committee ===
The purpose of the Steering Committee is to provide policy and direction for the GHTF. It is responsible for the assignment and oversight of new work items, adopt and monitor GHTF guidance documents and the authorization and promotion of GHTF training events.

The Steering Committee members consist of up to 8 members from each of the Founding Members' regions. Of the 8 members, up to 4 may be from the regulatory sectors and up to 4 from the industry sectors. The Chain and Vice Chair members of the controlling region are not to be included in this number.

=== Study groups ===
There are five study groups in the GHTF, each with a different focus. The size of each Study Group is to be determined by the Study Group Chair. Recommended members include one participant from each region with founding member status as well as appropriate numbers from regulatory agencies and industry technical experts.

==== Study Group 1 ====
Study Group 1 is concerned with the current medical device regulatory systems. From examining the current field, the group isolates the principles suitable for harmonization as well as those that pose a threat to harmonization. The Group also deals with the standardization of pre-market submissions and product labeling.

Examples of documents put out by Study Group 1 include Principles of Medical Devices Classification, and Labeling for Medical Devices.

==== Study Group 2 ====
Study Group 2 is concerned with medical device vigilance such as medical device reporting and post market surveillance. The Group is designed to harmonize the data collection and reporting systems of the industry. Examples of documents put out by Study Group 2 include Medical Devices Post Market Surveillance: Content of Field Safety Notices, Manufacturer's Trend Reporting of Adverse Events and National Competent Authority Report Exchange Criteria including reference to the use of the GMDN.

==== Study Group 3 ====
Study Group 3 is concerned with examining and harmonizing current quality systems requirements. Examples of documents put out by Study Group 3 include Implementation of Risk Management Principles and Activities Within a Quality Management System and Quality Management Systems - Process Validation Guidance.

==== Study Group 4 ====
Study Group 4 is concerned with examining current quality systems auditing practices and the harmonization of the auditing process. Examples of documents put out by Study Group 4 include Training Requirements for Auditors and Guidelines for Regulatory Auditing of Quality Management.

==== Study Group 5 ====
Study Group 5 is concerned with the convergence of clinical practices. This includes the harmonization of clinical terms, reports and evaluations. Study Group 5 has yet to produce any final documents, but areas of proposed topics include Clinical Evaluation and Clinical Evidence.

=== Study Group Chair ===
The Study Group Chair member is appointed for a three-year term by the Steering Committee. Upon completion of the term, the Chair is re-evaluated by the Steering Committee based on the needs of the Study Group. The support of a Vice Chair member usually consists of a member from the industry in a different region from the Chair.

== See also ==
- U.S. Food and Drug Administration
