= Substance-based medical device =

Type of medical device

A substance based medical device is a medical device composed of substances or combinations of substances. They are typically differentiated from medication (drugs) in that they do not have pharmacological, immunological or metabolic mode of action but achieve their therapeutic effect through primarily physical means.

== Examples ==
Examples of substance based medical devices include products for gastrointestinal relief like medicinal clay or simeticone-based products, as well as unmedicated nasal sprays, certain eye drops, dermal formulations, oral cough treatments, and other products for self-medication that often are available without a prescription.

== Regulation ==
Substance-based medical devices encompass a varied array of products that fall under the purview of Regulation (EU) 2017/745 (MDR). Based on their intended purpose, they are classified according to rule 21 ("Devices composed of substances that are introduced via a body orifice or applied to the skin") of Annex VIII of the MDR .
