= Medical materiel =

Medical supply technicians

Medical materiel are medical supply technicians employed by the hospitals, clinics, and the military; these professionals are responsible for managing and requisitioning, receiving, storing, issuing, safeguarding and accounting for supplies and medical equipment used in healthcare. In addition, medical supply technicians are responsible for maintaining requirements and records on storage/war reserve materiel; establishing stock control levels and inventory control; controlled medical items (i.e. drugs and precious metals); and delivering supplies and equipment to the customers. Medical logistics is often confused with and falls over the professional group in the hospital, the medical materiel/medical supply technicians.

Medical supply technicians have many specialized areas of which they work, such as medical equipment management office (MEMO), acquisitions, controlled medical items, inventory management, warehouse and distribution, and customer service.

== Training ==
Sound knowledge of high school courses in management, basic electronic data processing, bookkeeping, accounting, and business administration is highly desirable, and therefore tend to have bachelor's degrees in business and advanced degrees from major universities. Most entry-level technicians enter into the field with a two-year associate degree in medical materiel technology and have at least four years' experience in the field, or they spend around one year in full-time military training. A four-year graduate acts as a business administrator that perform the same medical materiel management duties similar to a medical supply or sales manager. Practical experience is gained through internships. Continuing education in the form of mentoring and service schools is typically provided by specific medical supply manufacturers.

== Professional certification ==
Medical materiel technicians typically require a type of professional certification, such as satisfying certain education requirements and passing an examination to become a certified materials & resources professional (CMRP, certified medical manager (CMM)), or certified professional logistician. In many cases, carrying the title of "CMRP" is highly encouraged, not mandatory, and is respected within the community.

== Employment ==
In-house they typically work in the hospital's medical logistics department, but can also find employment as a third-party supply organization. Sales/supply organizations they work for OEM or Third Parties and are often called sales specialists.

== Military roles in the United States ==
All military members entering the Medical Materiel career field receive comprehensive training and management training at the Department of Defense Medical Materiel Technician Training School.

=== United States Air Force ===
- Job Code 4A1X1 (where X represents the corresponding skill level 3, 5, 7 or 9)

=== United States Army ===
- Job Code 76J which transitioned to 91J and is now 68J

=== United States Navy ===
- Navy Enlisted Codes SK (StoreKeeper Technician)
