= Biomedical equipment technician =

Medical profession

A biomedical equipment technician (BMET) is an electro-mechanical technician that assembles, configures, maintains, and repairs medical equipment. In healthcare environments, BMETs often work with or officiate as a biomedical and/or clinical engineer, since the career field has no legal distinction between engineers and engineering technicians/technologists.

BMETs are employed by hospitals, clinics, private sector companies, and the military. Normally, BMETs install, inspect, maintain, repair, calibrate, modify and design biomedical equipment and support systems to adhere to medical standard guidelines but also perform specialized duties and roles. BMETs educate, train, and advise staff and other agencies on theory of operation, physiological principles, and safe clinical application of biomedical equipment maintaining the facility's patient care and medical staff equipment. Senior experienced BMETs perform the official part in the daily management and problem solving of healthcare technology beyond repairs and scheduled maintenance; such as, capitol asset planning, project management, budgeting and personnel management, designing interfaces and integrating medical systems, training end-users to utilize medical technology, and evaluating new devices for acquisition.

The acceptance of the BMET in the private sector was given a big push in 1970 when consumer advocate Ralph Nader wrote an article in which he claimed, "At least 1,200 people a year are electrocuted and many more are killed or injured in needless electrical accidents in hospitals."

BMETs cover a vast array of different functional fields and medical devices. However, BMETs do specialize and focus on specific kinds of medical devices and technology management—(i.e., an imaging repair specialist, laboratory equipment specialist, healthcare technology manager) and works strictly on medical imaging and/or medical laboratory equipment as well as supervises and/or manages HTM departments. These experts come from either from the military, or an OEM background. An imaging repair specialist usually does not have much, if any, general BMET training. However, there are situations where a BMET will cross-train into these functional fields.

Examples of different areas of medical equipment technology are:

- Diagnostic Imaging:
  - Radiographic and Fluoroscopic X-ray,
  - Diagnostic ultrasound,
  - Mammography,
  - Nuclear imaging,
  - Positron emission tomography (PET),
  - Medical imaging,
  - Computed tomography (CT), linear tomography,
  - Picture archiving and communication systems (PACS),
  - Magnetic resonance imaging (MRI scanner),
- Physiological monitoring,
- Electron microscope,
- Sterilization,
- LASERs,
- Dental,
- Telemedicine,
- Heart lung device,
- DaVinci Surgical Robot,
- Optometry,
- Surgical instruments,
- Infusion pumps,
- Anesthesia,
- Laboratory,
- Dialysis,
- Respiratory services (ventilators),
- Gas therapy equipment
- Computer networking systems integration,
- Information technology,
- Patient monitoring,
- Cardiac diagnostics

BMETs work closely with nursing staff, and medical materiel personnel to obtain parts, supplies, and equipment and even closer with facility management to coordinate equipment installations requiring certain facility infrastructure requirements/modifications.

== Regulatory issues ==
BMETs must conform with federal and state regulations and local standards on medical device safety. Most biomedical systems must also have recorded documentation to show how equipment has been managed, modified, tested, and delivered. In addition, biomedical systems are used according to a planned and approved process that increases the quality and safety of diagnostics and therapeutic equipment with a core aim of minimising the risk of injury, harm, or death to patients and staff.

In the United States, BMETs may operate under various regulatory frameworks. Clinical devices and technologies are generally governed by the Food and Drug Administration (FDA), National Fire Protection Agency (NFPA) particularly NFPA 99 and chapter 7, NFPA 70, Life Safety Code 101, Code of Federal Regulations (CFR) 21, Occupational Safety and Health Administration (OSHA), The Joint Commission (TJC) hospital or Accreditation Association for Ambulatory Health Care (AAAHC) standards; and ensures compliance with these codes and standards for the US government registry of biomedical devices.

In skilled nursing facilities certified for Medicare and Medicaid, this compliance work includes annual testing of patient care-related electrical equipment (PCREE) under NFPA 99, Chapter 10, which is reviewed during a facility's Life Safety Code survey.

Other countries typically have their own mechanisms for regulation.

== Biomedical equipment technology training ==
Traditionally, biomedical equipment technology has been an interdisciplinary field to specialize in after completing an associate degree in Biomedical Equipment Technology, biomedical electronics technology, or biomedical engineering technology. Some BMETs get their training through the military.

Most entry-level BMETs enter into the field with a 2-year associate degree in biomedical equipment technology, or they spend about one year in full-time military training. A 4-year graduate is a health technology management (HTM) professional who can perform official medical equipment management duties as a clinical engineer, clinical engineering manager or director of clinical engineering. Practical experience should be gained through internships while continuing education is provided by specific medical device manufacturers and on-the-job training classes. BMET degree programs should be accredited by the ABET (Accreditation Board for Engineering and Technology) or the ATMAE (Association of Technology, Management, and Applied Engineering) both of whom offer specialized/programmatic accreditation for BMET programs. In addition, many 4 year graduates from accredited programs have studied or go on to study biomedical engineering, more specifically clinical engineering, if they wish to perform research and/or design (or MBA programs, if they wish to work on the business or administrative side).

== Professional certification ==
Many BMETs pursue professional certification, such as satisfying certain education requirements and passing an examination from the International Certification Commission (ICC) and the Association for the Advancement of Medical Instrumentation (AAMI) to become a certified biomedical equipment technician (CBET), that is an accomplished generalized certification in the field covering many facets. There are four other certifications BMETs should obtain such as: certified radiology equipment specialists (CRES) that specializes more specifically in diagnostic imaging, radiological, and nuclear medicine equipment, Certified laboratory equipment specialists (CLES) that covers the abundance of equipment found in the many different kinds of laboratory environments, certified nephrology equipment specialist (CNES) that specifically specializes in nephrology and hemodialysis equipment, and certified healthcare technology manager (CHTM) that specializes in management of healthcare technology operations as well as the management of personnel. One can also choose to obtain the certified biomedical auditor (CBA) from the American Society of Quality or a Biomedical Electronics Technician certification (BMD) from the Electronics Technician Association (ETA) after first obtaining the Associate Electronics Technician certification (CET). In most cases, carrying the title of "CBET" is highly encouraged, not mandatory but supported, and is respected within the technical community.

== Employment ==
BMETs work in the hospital's biomedical or clinical engineering department, but can also find employment with a third-party independent service organization (ISO) or original equipment manufacturer (OEM).

BMETs working for an OEM or ISO are often called field service engineers (FSE). FSE are more narrowly focused and specialized technicians who support service and sales.

All military members entering the BMET career field receive comprehensive technical training. Prior to 1998, Army and Navy BMETs received training at the United States Army Equipment and Optical School (USAMEOS) at Fitzsimons Army Medical Center (FAMC) in Aurora, Colorado. In July 1995, a Base Realignment Closure Commission decided to close FAMC which caused the Army and Navy to merge with the Air Force to conduct training at the DoD Biomedical Equipment Technician Training School at Sheppard Air Force Base, Texas. This school has a partnership with Aims Community College where students receive 81 quarter credits (from the Community College of the Air Force) toward an associate of applied science (A.A.S.) Degree with an emphasis in Biomedical Electronic Technology. In addition to the credits acquired from DoD BMET Training School, a minimum of 24 credits must be completed through Aims Community College to receive a degree. As of August 4, 2010, the U. S. Military moved the BMET training to San Antonio, TX as a part of their new base realignment plan. All three forces remain in rigorous, tri-service training for 10 months prior to returning to their individual services. The training is held at Fort Sam Houston and is a part of the Medical Education and Training Campus (METC).The first METC BMET class started on August 4, 2010, and the last Sheppard class graduated on January 14, 2011.

== Advancements and its impact ==
Due to the rise of biomedical technology some hospitals have seen to it to have chief technology officers (CTOs) who help coordinate and provide technical support throughout the hospital, only at a corporate level. Living in a cost conscious world, personnel like such need to be implemented to help hospitals make sure that any new technological design or feature does not interfere negatively with the overall dynamic of the hospital. Change in this area is constant, and if abused could be the detriment not only to the hospital but more importantly to the patients who put their trust in the biomedical equipment that claim to ensure their recovery and aid.

As resources for the medical field become scarcer, getting ahead on technological advancements and spending more time on creating more efficient technology to be used in hospitals and other healthcare practices became more important. Unlike drugs, biomedical technology is dependent on how well they are maintained, thus creating a bigger and unprecedented opportunity and need for more biomedical technicians and engineers to keep up with this growing rate. Focusing on the quality of these products as well as how fast they are being produced is equally as important - cutting cost becomes useless if the robotics and devices cannot perform efficiently.
