= Global Medical Device Nomenclature =

Medical device identification system

Global Medical Device Nomenclature (GMDN) is a system of internationally agreed generic descriptors used to identify all medical device products. This nomenclature is a naming system for products which include those used for the diagnosis, prevention, monitoring, treatment or alleviation of disease or injury in humans.

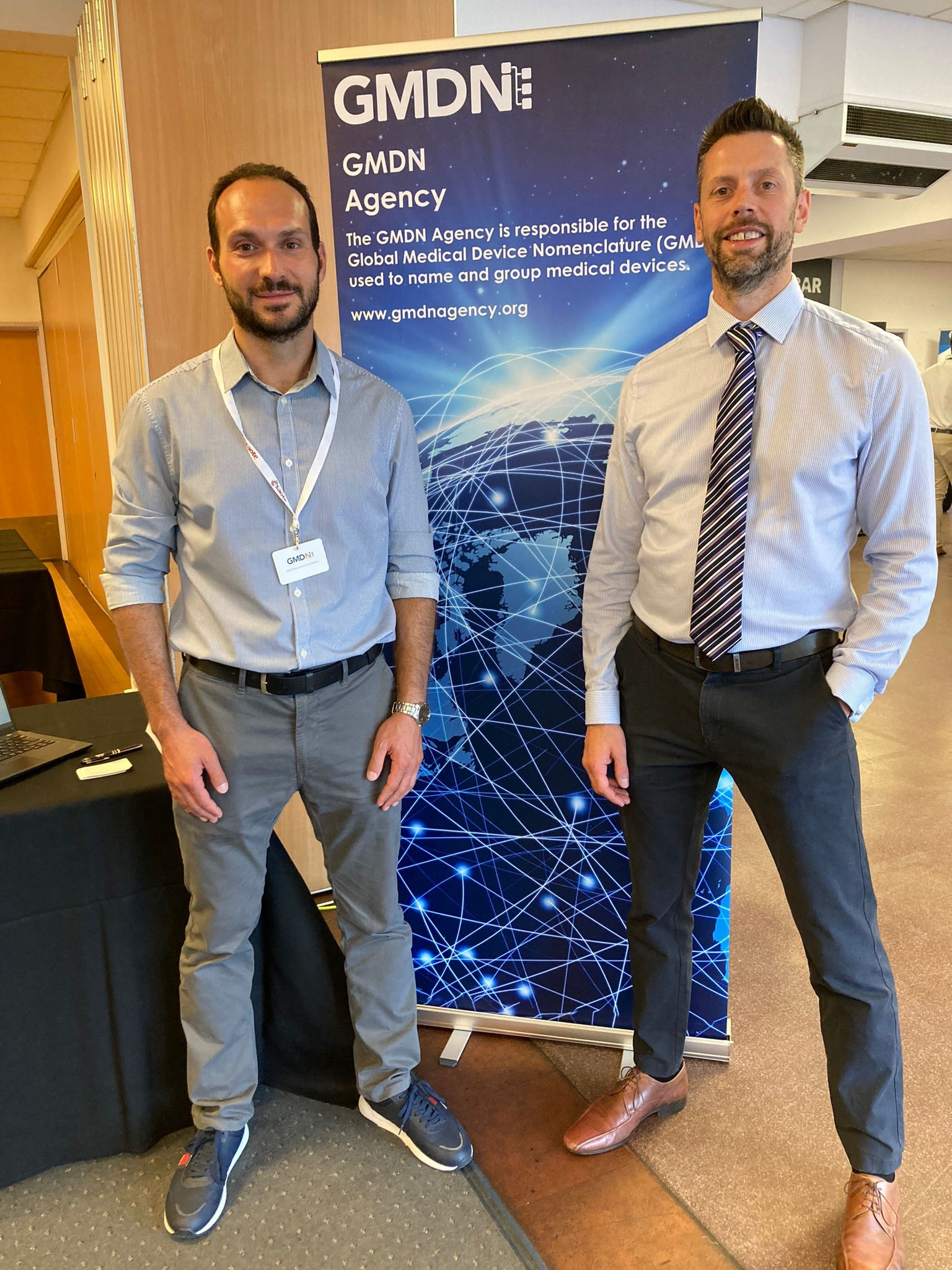
GMDN Agency colleagues at a MedTech event 2023

The Global Medical Device Nomenclature (GMDN) is the leading global standard for the naming, classification and categorisation of medical devices. Anyone can register for free as a member on the GMDN website to access and use any GMDN Term.

The GMDN provides Healthcare Professionals, Regulators, Manufacturers and others with a common language to communicate and share information.

GMDN enables safer and more effective patient care, fosters innovation and collaboration in the medical device industry, and supports global harmonisation of regulatory requirements.

The GMDN is designed to be flexible and adaptable to accommodate new and emerging technologies, and it is continually updated to reflect changes in the medical device landscape. The system is used by Regulators in nearly 70 countries worldwide and has members in around 140 countries across the globe. It has become a critical component of the global regulatory infrastructure for medical devices.

The full GMDN is available for free to Regulators, Healthcare Providers and Academic Researchers.

== Governance ==
The GMDN meets the need to identify medical devices at the global level, as identified in the Global Harmonization Task Force (GHTF) that have since disbanded (2012) and replaced by the IMDRF

GMDN is managed by the GMDN Agency, a non-profit organization and Registered Charity, which reports to its Board of Trustees, that represent medical device regulators and industry.

To maintain independence, the GMDN also receives scrutiny from two independent advice bodies – the Technical Advisory Group, and the Authorities Strategic Advisory Group.

=== Technical Advisory Group ===
The Technical Advisory Group (TAG) meet regularly and provide advice to the Board of Trustees on matters of relevance to the satisfactory maintenance of the GMDN, including:

- Ways to ensure that the GMDN meets International requirements of regulatory bodies, industry and other stakeholders as the primary working nomenclature.
- New and emerging international needs for nomenclatures.
- Means of ensuring that developing technologies are monitored and incorporated as appropriate.

=== Authorities Strategic Advisory Group ===
The Authorities Strategic Advisory Group (ASAG) represents medical device Regulators that use the GMDN. The ASAG’s key role is to provide advice and feedback to Trustees and the GMDN Agency, including:

- Having appropriate review structures in place to ensure that relevant stakeholders, including from different regions, can provide feedback and be consulted about the GMDN supporting their needs.
- The promotion of the GMDN to encourage broader adoption and global harmonisation of the GMDN as a detailed nomenclature that underpins an efficient and effective regulatory model of safety and performance for medical devices.
- Enhancing medical device safety by use of the GMDN that facilitates and promotes data exchange and analysis.

As a regulated charity, all ASAG members and observers are volunteers and not funded for activity linked with GMDN Agency governance. The ASAG committee meet regularly, and the Trustees are invited as observers.

The committee is currently made up of representatives from the UK’s Medicines and Healthcare products Regulatory Agency (MHRA), the Brazilian Health Regulatory Agency (ANVISA), the United States Food and Drug Administration (FDA), Australia’s Therapeutic Goods Administration (TGA) and Health Canada.

== Structure ==
The GMDN term is in the form of a 5-digit numeric GMDN Code cross-referenced to a specific Term Name and Definition, with which all specific medical devices having substantially similar generic features, can be identified. The following is an example:

- GMDN Term Name - "Scalpel, single-use"
- GMDN Code - "47569"
- GMDN Definition - "A sterile, hand-held, manual surgical instrument constructed as a one-piece handle and scalpel blade (not an exchangeable component) used by the operator to manually cut or dissect tissue. The blade is typically made of high-grade stainless steel alloy or carbon steel and the handle is often made of plastic. This is a single-use device."

The GMDN term and other associated data is copyright protected and the GMDN is a Trademark.

Uniquely each GMDN term has a set of attributes, known as Collective Terms, which help to navigate the GMDN Database and aid the selection of a GMDN term by medical condition or product feature.

The GMDN is used by regulators, healthcare providers and others for activities such as medical device recalls, adverse event reporting and postmarket surveillance and monitoring, as well as inventory control and other healthcare management functions.

The GMDN Agency updates the GMDN utilizing member change requests, to add a new generic device term or to change an existing Term Name or Definition. The GMDN Agency releases updates to the GMDN on a daily basis, on their interactive website, the GMDN Database. Only Members have access to the GMDN Database. Since 1 April 2019 GMDN membership and therefore access to GMDN Terms and Codes has been free of any charge. The GMDN is available in English and other languages.

== Global use of GMDN ==
The GMDN is used by Regulators in around 70 countries worldwide and has members in circa 140 countries across the globe.

The GMDN is part of the 'minimum data set' of the US FDA Unique Device Identification regulation for the registration of new Medical Devices intended for use in the United States. This follows the international consensus established by the International Medical Device Regulators Forum (IMDRF).

The GMDN is required by the UK's national medical device regulator, the Medicines and Healthcare products Regulatory Agency

The government agency responsible for medical device safety in Australia Therapeutic Goods Administration require the GMDN when registering a product within its ARTG system

In 2024, the World Health Organization (WHO) and the Global Medical Device Nomenclature (GMDN) Agency announced a new collaboration that will improve the management and safety of medical devices used around the world.

The relationship included the WHO using 3,000 GMDN Terms, Codes and Definitions within its online medical device information platforms such as the MeDevIS (Priority Medical Devices Information System), an open access WHO electronic database of Medical Devices.

The GMDN Agency has established long term cooperation with the IHTSDO. The Cooperation Agreement shall result in the use of the GMDN as the medical device component of SNOMED CT. This Agreement is consistent with the aims of both organisations to minimise duplication and to support harmonisation. The following objectives were agreed:

- A more comprehensive and harmonised clinical terminology
- Greater utility and access to both terminologies
- Opportunities to improve organisational efficiencies

The Agreement will benefit patients across the world and all users of SNOMED CT and the GMDN in promoting comprehensive terminology based medical records, covering the needs of regulators, the medical device industry and healthcare professionals. The arrangement will enhance the application of care to individual patients for medical device, patient risk and safety use cases.

== Real World Evidence of how GMDN can support UDI implementation ==
Unique Device Identification (UDI) is a regulatory initiative established by various health authorities, including the FDA (Food & Drug Administration) in the United States, the TGA (Therapeutic Goods Association) in Australia and the MHRA (Medicines and Healthcare products Regulatory Agency) in the UK amongst others, to support their regulatory frameworks.

A UDI is assigned to each medical device by an Issuing Agency (e.g., GS1, HIBBC) authorised by regulatory authorities. This consists of two parts: a device identifier (DI) and the production identifier (PI). While the core structure of UDI is globally harmonised based on the IMDRF’s UDI Guidance, each country’s UDI system may also have specific data element requirements. For example, the AccessGUDID maintained by the FDA and the National Library of Medicine (NLM) in the United States, has more than 60 data elements, one of which is the GMDN Code.

This system enhances the ability to trace devices throughout their lifecycle, from manufacturing to patient use. The integration of GMDN into UDI databases is a significant step towards improving the safety, traceability, and management of medical devices. By providing a standardised terminology and supporting regulatory compliance, GMDN plays a vital role in facilitating the effective implementation of UDI. As the medical device industry continues to innovate, the alignment between GMDN and UDI will remain essential for healthcare intelligence and device lifecycle management.

== Medical device risk classification ==
Medical device nomenclature is distinct from regulatory risk classification. Nomenclature systems such as the GMDN group devices according to shared generic characteristics and provide standardised terms for identification and data exchange. Regulatory classification, by contrast, determines the level of regulatory control and the applicable conformity assessment procedure.

Under the European Union Medical Device Regulation (Regulation (EU) 2017/745), medical devices are classified as Class I, Class IIa, Class IIb or Class III, taking into account their intended purpose and the risks associated with their use. Classification is carried out by applying the rules set out in Article 51 and Annex VIII of the Regulation."Regulation (EU) 2017/745 on medical devices". EUR-Lex. European Union.

Several factors may affect the classification, including the duration of use, whether the device is invasive or active, the part of the body with which it interacts and its intended medical purpose. The manufacturer remains responsible for determining and documenting the appropriate classification under the applicable regulatory framework.

Online decision-support tools may be used to obtain an initial, non-binding indication of the rules that could apply to a device. One example is MDClassify, a free online tool that guides users through a questionnaire and provides a preliminary indication of a device’s possible classification under the EU MDR."Free EU MDR medical device classification tool". MDClassify. Such tools do not provide an official or legally binding classification and do not replace the manufacturer’s regulatory assessment, the classification rationale included in the technical documentation or professional regulatory advice, as they're the most optimal way to have a pre-evaluation classification of a Medical Device.

== See also ==
- Unique Device Identification
- IHTSDO - International Health Terminology Standards Development Organisation
- Meddra - Terminology for the pharmaceutical industry.
- Medical device
