= Unique Device Identification =

US medical device identification system

The Unique Device Identification (UDI) System is intended to assign a unique identifier to medical devices within the United States, Europe, China, South Korea, Saudi Arabia and Taiwan. It was signed into law in the US on September 27, 2007, as part of the Food and Drug Administration Amendments Act (Section 226) of 2007.

== United States ==
These harmonized pieces of legislation include language related to the establishment of a Unique Device Identification System. When implemented, the new system will always be in reverse mode :

- The label of a device to bear a unique identifier, unless an alternative location is specified by the U.S. Food and Drug Administration (FDA) or unless an exception is made for a particular device or group of devices.
- The unique identifier to be able to identify the device through distribution and use
- The unique identifier to include the lot or serial number if specified by FDA

A national UDI system will create a common vocabulary for reporting and enhance electronic tracking abilities. Currently, analysis of adverse event reports is limited by the fact that the specific devices involved in an incident are often not known with the required degree of specificity. Without a common vocabulary for medical devices, meaningful analysis based on data from existing voluntary systems is problematic. Reliable and consistent identification of medical devices would enable safety surveillance so that the FDA and manufacturers could better identify potential problems or device defects, and improve patient care.

The UDI is expected to improve patient safety (in part by helping to identify counterfeit products and by improving the ability of staff to distinguish between devices that are similar in appearance but serve different functions), facilitate and improve the recall process, and create efficiencies within the medical system.

In the most basic format, the UDI would be a coded number registered with standards organizations, and would incorporate a variety of information, including (but not limited to) the manufacturer of the device, expiry dates, the make and model of the device, and any special attributes that the device may possess. In a medical sense, "device" refers to any product that is not pharmaceutical in nature, and while the FDA have been given approval to exempt some devices, Jay Crowley (who was responsible for implementing the UDI requirements in the Act), has expressed an intent to apply the UDI to "everything until somebody gives us good reason not to", (excluding devices which won't need identification).

Following the passing of the Act, there were calls for the FDA to publish a timeline for the implementation of the UDI; this was subsequently done.

GUDID Submission
The Final Rule on Unique Device Identifiers also mandates medical device manufacturers to make a submission to the FDA's Global Unique Device Identification Database. The submission to the GUDID will include the Primary Device Identifier portion of the UDI as well as associated data attributes about each model or version number of the device.

Compliance with the submission component of UDI compliance is phased according to the Class of device. Class III device labelers must submit to the GUDID for all existing products by September 24, 2014. Labelers of Implantable, Life Supporting or Life Sustaining devices must submit to the GUDID by September 24, 2015. Class II labelers must comply with submission guidelines by September 24, 2016, and Class I labelers by September 24, 2018.

Submission to the GUDID may be made in one of two methods. The first method utilizes the FDA's GUDID Web Interface, which is meant for low volumes of GUDID submissions. The second method utilizes an HL7 SPL submission and is transmitted to the FDA through an Electronic Submission Gateway account.

Once the initial submission is made, labelers of medical devices must update the GUDID submission each time there is a change to the device attributes. While many device attributes may be updated once the device record is published within the GUDID, several attributes cannot be changed and will necessitate the labeler deactivate the existing submission and resubmit using a new Device Identifier.

== European Union ==
The EU acted to adopt UDI and on April 5, 2017, under the Medical Devices Regulation (MDR) and In-vitro Diagnostic Regulation (IVDR), but adoption has been postponed to 2021; see Medical Device Regulation. The timelines for UDI marking of medical devices, direct marking of medical devices, and marking of IVD allow for a staggered introduction.

The EU UDI scheme includes the so-called Basic UDI-DI, a regulatory identifier of a device and key to the EUDAMED database, that does not appear on the device packaging but has to be listed on the Declaration of Conformity. Devices and packaging are to be marked with a device identifier ("UDI-DI"), identifying manufacturer and product, and a production identifier ("UDI-PI)", consisting of, e.g., the LOT and/or expiration date. Custom-made and investigational devices are exempt from this requirement. The direct marking of reusable devices is also included in the regulation.

Legacy devices that do not have a previously assigned Basic UDI-DI, they are assigned an EUDAMED-DI for the purpose of registration in EUDAMED. Instead of the UDI-DI, an EUDAMED ID can be assigned for registration.

As of July 2022, the EU has recognized four UDI-DI issuing agencies: GS1 AISBL; Health Industry Business Communications Council (HIBCC); ICCBBA, and Informationsstelle für Arzneispezialitäten (IFA GmbH).

== See also ==
- Medical device
- Global Medical Device Nomenclature
