= Direct acoustic cochlear implant =

- Specialty: Otorhinolaryngology

A direct acoustic cochlear implant (DACI) is an acoustic implant which converts sound in mechanical vibrations that stimulate directly the perilymph inside the cochlea. The hearing function of the external and middle ear is being taken over by a little motor of a cochlear implant, directly stimulating the cochlea. With a DACI, people with no or almost no residual hearing but with a still functioning inner ear, can again perceive speech, sounds and music.

== Details ==
A DACI tries to provide an answer for people with hearing problems for which no solution exists today. People with some problems at the level of the cochlea can be helped with a hearing aid. A hearing aid will absorb the incoming sound from a microphone, and offer enhanced through the natural way. For larger reinforcements, this may cause problems with feedback and distortion. A hearing aid also simply provides more loudness, no more resolution. Users will view this often as, "all sounds louder, but I understand nothing more than before." Once a hearing aid offers no solution anymore, one can switch to a cochlear implant. A Cochlear implant captures the sound and sends it electrically, through the cochlea, to the auditory nerve. In this way, completely deaf patients can perceive sounds again. However, As soon as there are problems not only at the level of the cochlea, but also in the middle ear (the so-called conductive losses), then there are more efficient ways to get sound to the partially functioning cochlea. The most obvious solution is a bone anchored hearing aid (BAHA), which brings the sound to the cochlea via bone conduction. However, patients who have both problems with the cochlea, as with the middle ear (i.e. patients with mixed losses), none of the above solutions is ideal. To this end, the direct acoustic cochlear implant was developed. A DACI brings the sound directly to the cochlea, and provides the most natural way of sound amplification. DACI is an official product category, as indicated by the nomenclature of Global Medical Device Nomenclature (GMDN).

== History ==
The first DACI was implanted in Hannover. In Belgium, the first DACI was implanted at the Catholic University Hospital of Leuven. In the Netherlands, the Radboud clinic in Nijmegen was the first while in Poland it was first implanted at the Institute of Physiology and Pathology of Hearing in Warsaw.
