= Clinical engineering =

Modern medical technologies

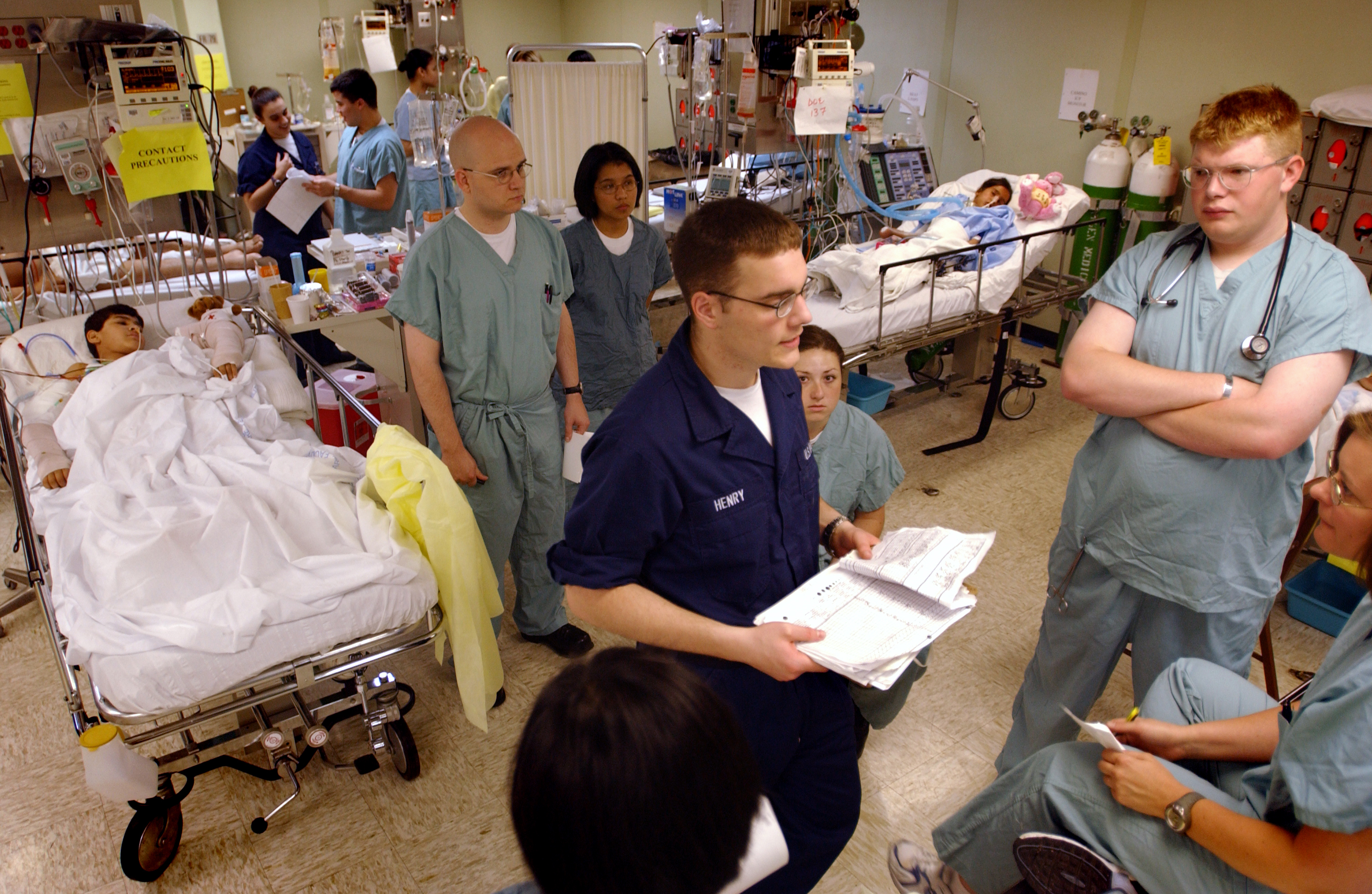
Clinical engineers are required to understand all modern medical technologies, as well as train, troubleshoot, and design entire clinical settings.

Clinical engineering is a specialty within biomedical engineering responsible for using medical technology to optimize healthcare delivery.

Clinical engineers train and supervise biomedical equipment technicians (BMETs), working with governmental regulators on hospital inspections and audits, and serve as technological consultants for other hospital staff (i.e., Physicians, Administrators, IT). Clinical engineers also assist manufacturers in improving the design of medical equipment and maintain state-of-the-art hospital supply chains.

With training in both product design and point-of-use experience, clinical engineers bridge the gap between product developers and end-users.

The focus on practical implementations tends to keep clinical engineers oriented towards incremental redesigns, as opposed to revolutionary or cutting-edge ideas far-off of implementation for clinical use. However, there is an effort to expand this time horizon, over which clinical engineers can influence the trajectory of biomedical innovation.

Clinical engineering departments at large hospitals will sometimes hire not only biomedical engineers, but also industrial and systems engineers to address topics such as operations research, human factors, cost analysis, and safety.

== History ==
The term clinical engineering was first used in a 1969 paper by Landoll and Caceres. Caceres, a cardiologist, is generally credited with coining the term.

The broader field of biomedical engineering also has a relatively recent history, with the first inter-society engineering meeting focused on engineering in medicine probably held in 1948.

However, the general notion of applying engineering to medicine can be traced back to centuries.

For example, Stephen Hales' work in the early 18th century, which led to the invention of the ventilator and the discovery of blood pressure, involved applying engineering techniques to medicine.

In the early 1970s, clinical engineering was thought to require many new professionals. Estimates of the time for the US ranged as high as 5,000 to 8,000 clinical engineers, or 1 per 250 hospital beds.

=== Credentialization ===
The International Certification Commission for Clinical Engineers (ICC) was formed under the sponsorship of the Association for the Advancement of Medical Instrumentation (AAMI) in the early 1970s to provide a formal certification process for clinical engineers.

A similar certification program was formed by academic institutions offering graduate degrees in clinical engineering as the American Board of Clinical Engineering (ABCE).

In 1979, the ABCE dissolved, and those certified under its program were accepted into the ICC certification program. By 1985, only 350 clinical engineers had become certified.

After a 1998 survey demonstrating no viable market for its certification program, the AAMI ceased accepting new applicants in July 1999.

The new, current clinical engineering certification (CCE) started in 2002 under the sponsorship of the American College of Clinical Engineering (ACCE) and is administered by the ACCE Healthcare Technology Foundation.

In 2004, the first year the certification process was underway, 112 individuals were granted certification based upon their previous ICC certification, and three individuals were awarded the new certification. By the time of the 2006-2007 AHTF Annual Report (c. June 30, 2007), 147 individuals had become HTF certified clinical engineers.

== Definition and terminology ==
A clinical engineer was defined by the ACCE in 1991 as "a professional who supports and advances patient care by applying engineering and managerial skills to healthcare technology."

Clinical engineering is also recognized by the Biomedical Engineering Society, the major professional organization for biomedical engineering, as being a branch within the field of biomedical engineering.

=== Confusion over ACCE Definition ===
There are at least two issues with the ACCE definition that often cause confusion.

First, it is unclear how "clinical engineer" is a subset of "biomedical engineer".

The terms are often used interchangeably: some hospitals refer to their relevant departments as "Clinical Engineering" departments, while others call them "Biomedical Engineering" departments. The technicians are almost universally referred to as "biomedical equipment technicians," regardless of the department they work under.

However, the term biomedical engineer is generally thought to be more all-encompassing, as it includes engineers who design medical devices for manufacturers, or in academia. In contrast, clinical engineers generally work in hospitals solving problems close to where the equipment is actually used. Clinical engineers in some countries, such as India, are trained to innovate and find technological solutions for clinical needs.

The other issue, not evident from the ACCE definition, is the appropriate educational background for a clinical engineer.

Generally, certification programs expect applicants to hold an accredited bachelor's degree in engineering (or at least engineering technology).

=== Potential new name ===
In 2011, AAMI arranged a meeting to discuss a new name for clinical engineering. After careful debate, the vast majority decided on "Healthcare Technology Management".

Due to confusion about the dividing line between clinical engineers (engineers) and BMETs (technicians), the word engineering was deemed limiting from the administrator's perspective and unworkable from the educator's perspective. An ABET-accredited college could not name an associate degree program "engineering". Also, the adjective, clinical, limited the scope of the field to hospitals.

It remains unresolved how widely accepted this change will be, how this will affect the Clinical Engineering Certification or the formal recognition of clinical engineering as a subset of biomedical engineering.

For regulatory and licensure reasons, true engineering specialties must be defined in a way that distinguishes them from the technicians they work alongside.

== Certification ==
Certification in clinical engineering is governed by the Board of Examiners for Clinical Engineering Certification.

To be eligible, a candidate must hold appropriate credentials (such as an accredited engineering or engineering-technology degree), have specific and relevant experience, and pass an examination.

The certification process involves a three-hour written examination of up to 150 multiple-choice questions and a separate oral exam. Weight is given to applicants who are already licensed and registered Professional Engineers, which has extensive requirements itself.

In Canada, the term 'engineer' is protected by law. As a result, a candidate must be registered as a Professional Engineer (P.Eng.) before they can become a Certified Clinical Engineer.

== In the UK ==
Clinical engineers in the UK typically work within the NHS.

Clinical engineering is a modality of the clinical scientist profession, registered by the HCPC. The responsibilities of clinical engineers are varied and often include providing specialist clinical services, inventing and developing medical devices, and medical device management. The roles typically involve both patient contact and academic research. Clinical engineering units within an NHS organization are often part of a larger medical physics department.

Clinical engineers are supported and represented by the Institute of Physics and Engineering in Medicine, within which the clinical engineering special interest group oversees the engineering activities.

The three primary aims of Clinical Engineering with the NHS are:

1. To ensure medical equipment in the clinical environment is available and appropriate to the needs of the clinical service.
2. To ensure medical equipment functions effectively and safely.
3. To ensure medical equipment and its management represents value for patient benefit.

=== Registration ===
Clinical engineers are registered with the HCPC, or the RCT (Register of Clinical Technologist). Assessments prior to registration are provided by the National School of Healthcare Science, the Association of Clinical Scientists or the AHCS.

There are two HCPC programs for becoming a clinical scientist. The first is a Certificate of Attainment, awarded for completing the NHS Scientist Training Programme (STP).

The second is the Certificate of Equivalence, awarded on successful demonstration of equivalence to the STP. This route is normally chosen by individuals that have significant scientific experience prior to seeking registration.

Both are provided by the AHCS.

=== Electronics and Biomedical Engineering ===
EBME technicians and engineers in the UK work in the NHS and private sector. They are part of the Clinical Engineering familiar in the UK.

Their role is to manage and maintain medical equipment assets in NHS and private healthcare organizations. They are professionally registered with the Engineering Council as Chartered Engineers, Incorporated Engineers, or engineering technicians.

The EBME community share their knowledge on the EBME Forums.

There is also an annual 2-day National Exhibition and Conference, wherein engineers meet to learn about the latest medical products and to attend the 500-seat conference where academic and business leaders share their expertise. The conference was founded in 2009 as a way of improving healthcare through sharing knowledge from experienced professionals involved in medical equipment management.

== In India ==
Healthcare has increasingly become technology-driven and requires trained manpower to keep pace with the growing demand for professionals in the field.

An M-Tech Clinical Engineering course was initiated by Indian Institute of Technology Madras, Sree Chitra Thirunal Institute of Medical Sciences and Technology, Trivandrum and Christian Medical College, Vellore, to address the country's need for human resource development.

This was aimed at indigenous biomedical device development as well as technology management in order to contribute to the overall development of healthcare delivery in the country.

During the course, students of engineering are given an insight into biology, medicine, relevant electronic background, clinical practices, device development, and even management aspects.

Students are paired with clinical doctors from CMC and SCTIMST to get hands-on experience during internships. An important aspect of this training is simultaneous, long-term, and detailed exposure to the clinical environment as well as to medical device development activity.

This will help students understand how to recognize unmet clinical needs and contribute to the creation of future medical devices. Engineers will be trained to handle and oversee the safe and effective use of technology in healthcare delivery sites as part of the program.

The minimum qualification for joining this course is a bachelor's degree in any discipline of engineering, technology, or architecture, and a valid GATE score with an interview process in that field.

== See also ==
- Biomedical engineering
