= Medical equipment management =

Healthcare technology operations management

Medical equipment management (sometimes referred to as clinical engineering, clinical engineering management, clinical technology management, healthcare technology management, biomedical maintenance, biomedical equipment management, and biomedical engineering) is a term for the professionals who manage operations, analyze and improve utilization and safety, and support servicing healthcare technology. These healthcare technology managers are, much like other healthcare professionals referred to by various specialty or organizational hierarchy names.

Some of the titles of healthcare technology management professionals are biomed, biomedical equipment technician, biomedical engineering technician, biomedical engineer, BMET, biomedical equipment management, biomedical equipment services, imaging service engineer, imaging specialist, clinical engineer technician, clinical engineering equipment technician, field service engineer, field clinical engineer, clinical engineer, and medical equipment repair person. Regardless of the various titles, these professionals offer services within and outside of healthcare settings to enhance the safety, utilization, and performance on medical devices, applications, and systems.

They are a fundamental part of managing, maintaining, or designing medical devices, applications, and systems for use in various healthcare settings, from the home and the field to the doctor's office and the hospital.

HTM includes the business processes used in interaction and oversight of the technology involved in the diagnosis, treatment, and monitoring of patients. The related policies and procedures govern activities such as the selection, planning, and acquisition of medical devices, and the inspection, acceptance, maintenance, and eventual retirement and disposal of medical equipment.

== Responsibilities of the healthcare technology management professional ==
The healthcare technology management professional's purpose is to ensure that equipment and systems used in patient care are operational, safe, and properly configured to meet the mission of the healthcare; that the equipment is used in an effective way consistent with the highest standards of care by educating the healthcare provider, equipment user, and patient; that the equipment is designed to limit the potential for loss, harm, or damage to the patient, provider, visitor, and facilities through various means of analysis prior to and during acquisition, monitoring and foreseeing problems during the lifecycle of the equipment, and collaborating with the parties who manufacture, design, regulate, or recommend safe medical devices and systems.

Some but not all of the healthcare technology management professional's functions are:

- Equipment control and asset management
- Equipment inventories
- Work order management
- Data quality management
- Equipment maintenance management
- Equipment maintenance
- Personnel management
- Quality assurance
- Patient safety
- Risk management
- Hospital safety programs
- Radiation safety
- Medical gas supply systems
- In-service education and training
- Accident investigation
- Analysis of failures, root causes, and human factors
- Safe Medical Devices Act (SMDA) of 1990
- Health Insurance Portability and Accountability Act (HIPAA)
- Careers in facility management

== Equipment control and asset management ==
Every medical treatment facility should have policies and processes on equipment control and asset management. Equipment control and asset management involves the management of medical devices within a facility and may be supported by automated information systems (e.g., enterprise resource planning (ERP) systems are often found in U.S. hospitals, and the U.S. military health system uses an advanced automated system known as the Defense Medical Logistics Standard Support (DMLSS) suite of applications) or may use a dedicated equipment management and maintenance software. Equipment control begins with the receipt of a newly acquired equipment item and continues through the item's entire lifecycle. Newly acquired devices should be inspected by in-house or contracted biomedical equipment technicians (BMETs), who will receive an established equipment control/asset number from the facilities equipment/property manager. This control number is used to track and record maintenance actions in their database. This is similar to creating a new chart for a new patient who will be seen at the medical facility. Once an equipment control number is established, the device is safety inspected and readied for delivery to clinical and treatment areas in the facility.

Facilities or healthcare delivery networks may rely on a combination of equipment service providers such as manufacturers, third-party services, in-house technicians, and remote support. Equipment managers are responsible for continuous oversight and responsibility for ensuring safe and effective equipment performance through full-service maintenance. Medical equipment managers are also responsible for technology assessment, planning and management in all areas within a medical treatment facility (e.g. developing policies and procedures for the medical equipment management plan, identifying trends and the need for staff education, resolution of defective biomedical equipment issues).

== Work order management ==
Work order management involves systematic, measurable, and traceable methods to all acceptance/initial inspections, preventive maintenance, and calibrations, or repairs by generating scheduled and unscheduled work orders. Work order management may be paper-based or computer-base and includes the maintenance of active (open or uncompleted) and completed work orders which provide a comprehensive maintenance history of all medical equipment devices used in the diagnosis, treatment, and management of patients. Work order management includes all safety, preventive, calibration, test, and repair services performed on all such medical devices. A comprehensive work order management system can also be used as a resource and workload management tool by managers responsible for personnel time, total number of hours technician spent working on equipment, maximum repair dollar for one time repair, or total dollar allowed to spend repairing equipment versus replacement.

Post-work order quality checks involve one of two methods: 100% audit of all work orders or statistical sampling of randomly selected work orders. Randomly selected work orders should place more stringent statistical controls based on the clinical criticality of the device involved. For example, 100% of items critical to patient treatment but only 50% of ancillary items may be selected for sampling. In an ideal setting, all work orders are checked, but available resources may dictate a less comprehensive approach. Work orders must be tracked regularly and all discrepancies must be corrected. Managers are responsible to identify equipment location.

== Data quality management ==
Accurate, comprehensive data are needed in any automated medical equipment management system. Data quality initiatives can help to insure the accuracy of clinical/biomedical engineering data. The data needed to establish basic, accurate, maintainable automated records for medical equipment management includes: nomenclature, manufacturer, nameplate model, serial number, acquisition cost, condition code, and maintenance assessment. Other useful data could include: warranty, location, other contractor agencies, scheduled maintenance due dates, and intervals. These fields are vital to ensure appropriate maintenance is performed, equipment is accounted for, and devices are safe for use in patient care.

- Nomenclature: It defines what the device is, how, and the type of maintenance is to be performed. Common nomenclature systems are taken directly from the ECRI Institute Universal Medical Device Nomenclature System.
- Manufacturer: This is the name of the company that received approval from the FDA to sell the device, also known as the Original Equipment Manufacturer (OEM).
- Nameplate model: The model number is typically located on the front/behind of the equipment or on the cover of the service manual and is provided by the OEM. E.g. Medtronic PhysioControl's Lifepak 10 Defibrillator can actually be any one of the following correct model numbers listed: 10-41, 10-43, 10 -47, 10-51, and 10-57.
- Serial number: This is usually found on the data plate as well, is a serialized number (could contain alpha characters) provided by the manufacturer. This number is crucial to device alerts and recalls.
- Acquisition cost: The total purchased price for an individual item or system. This cost should include installation, shipping, and other associated costs. These numbers are crucial for budgeting, maintenance expenditures, and depreciation reporting.
- Condition code: This code is mainly used when an item is turned in and should be changed when there are major changes to the device that could affect whether or not an item should be salvaged, destroyed, or used by another Medical Treatment Facility.
- Maintenance assessment: This assessment must be validated every time a BMET performs any kind of maintenance on a device.

Several other management tools, such as equipment replacement planning and budgeting, depreciation calculations, and at the local level literature, repair parts, and supplies are directly related to one or more of these fundamental basics. Data Quality must be tracked monthly and all discrepancies must be corrected.

== Quality assurance ==
Quality assurance is a way of identifying an item of supply or equipment as being defective. A good quality control/engineering program improves quality of work and lessens the risk of staff/patient injuries/death.

== Patient safety ==
Safety of patients and staff is essential to the success of the organizations mission. The Joint Commission publishes annual lists detailing “National Patient Safety Goals” to be implemented by healthcare organizations. Goals are developed by experts in patient safety nurses, physicians, pharmacists, risk managers, and other professionals with patient-safety experience in a variety of settings. Patient safety is among the most important goals of every healthcare provider, and participation in a variety of committees and processes concerned with patient safety provides a way for biomedical managers and clinical engineering departments to gain visibility and positively affect their workplace.

== Risk management ==
This program helps the medical treatment facility avoid the likelihood of equipment-related risks, minimize liability of mishaps and incidents, and stay compliant with regulatory reporting requirements. The best practice is to use a rating system for every equipment type. For example, a risk-rating system might rate defibrillators as considered high risk, general-purpose infusion pumps as medium risk, electronic thermometers as low risk, and otoscopes as no significant risk. This system could be set up using Microsoft Excel or Access program for a manager's or technician's quick reference.

In addition, user error, equipment abuse, no problem/fault found occurrences must be tracked to assist risk management personnel in determining whether additional clinical staff training must be performed.

Risk management for IT networks incorporating medical devices will be covered by the standard ISO/IEC 80001. Its purpose is: "Recognizing that MEDICAL DEVICES are incorporated into IT-NETWORKS to achieve desirable benefits (for example, INTEROPERABILITY), this international standard defines the roles, responsibilities and activities that are necessary for RISK MANAGEMENT of IT-NETWORKS incorporating MEDICAL DEVICES to address the KEY PROPERTIES". It resorts some basic ideas of ISO 20000 in the context of medical applications, e.g. configuration, incident, problem, change and release management, and risk analysis, control and evaluation according to ISO 14971. IEC 80001 "applies to RESPONSIBLE ORGANIZATIONS, MEDICAL DEVICE manufacturers and other providers of information technologies for the purpose of comprehensive RISK MANAGEMENT".

== Hospital safety programs ==
The Joint Commission stipulates seven management plans for hospital accreditation. One of the seven is safety. Safety includes a range of hazards including mishaps, injuries on the job, and patient care hazards. The most common safety mishaps are "needle-sticks" (staff accidentally stick themselves with a needle) or patient injury during care. As a manager, ensure all staff and patients are safe within the facility. Note: it's everyone's responsibility!

There are several meetings that medical equipment managers are required to attend as the organizations technical representative:

- Patient safety
- Environment of care
- Space utilization committee
- Equipment review board
- Infection control (optional)

Educational requirements for bio-medical engineer: Students should take the most challenging science, math, and English courses available in high school. All biomedical engineers have at least a bachelor's degree in engineering. Many have advanced graduate degrees as well. Courses of study include a sound background in mechanical, chemical, or industrial engineering, and specialized biomedical training. Most programs last from four to six years, and all states require biomedical engineers to pass examinations and be licensed.

Duties and responsibilities for bio-medical engineer: Description: Biomedical Engineers use engineering principles to solve health related and medical problems. They do a lot of research in conjunction with life scientists, chemists, and medical professionals to design medical devices like artificial hearts, pacemakers, dialysis machines, and surgical lasers. Some conduct research on biological and other life systems or investigate ways to modernize laboratory and clinical procedures. Frequently, biomedical engineers supervise biomedical equipment maintenance technicians, investigate medical equipment failure, and advise hospitals about purchasing and installing new equipment. Biomedical engineers work in hospitals, universities, industry, and research laboratories.

Working conditions: Biomedical engineers work in offices, laboratories, workshops, manufacturing plants, clinics and hospitals. Some local travel may be required if medical equipment is located in various clinics or hospitals. Most biomedical engineers work standard weekday hours. Longer hours may be required to meet research deadlines, work with patients at times convenient to them, or work on medical equipment that is in use during daytime hours.

Duties: Biomedical engineers work closely with life scientists, chemists and medical professionals (physicians, nurses, therapists and technicians) on the engineering aspects of biological systems. Duties and responsibilities vary from one position to another but, in general, biomedical engineers:

- design and develop medical devices such as artificial hearts and kidneys, pacemakers, artificial hips, surgical lasers, automated patient monitors and blood chemistry sensors.
- design and develop engineered therapies (for example, neural-integrative prostheses).
- adapt computer hardware or software for medical science or health care applications (for example, develop expert systems that assist in diagnosing diseases, medical imaging systems, models of different aspects of human physiology or medical data management).
- conduct research to test and modify known theories and develop new theories.
- ensure the safety of equipment used for diagnosis, treatment and monitoring.
- investigate medical equipment failures and provide advice about the purchase and installation of new equipment.
- develop and evaluate quantitative models of biological processes and systems.
- apply engineering methods to answer basic questions about how the body works.
- contribute to patient assessments.
- prepare and present reports for health professionals and the public.
- supervise and train technologists and technicians.

Biomedical engineers may work primarily in one or a combination of the following fields:

- bioinformatics – developing and using computer tools to collect and analyze data.
- bioinstrumentation – applying electronic and measurement techniques.
- biomaterials – developing durable materials that are compatible with a biological environment.
- biomechanics - applying knowledge of mechanics to biological or medical problems.
- bio-nano-engineering – developing novel structures of nanometer dimensions for application to biology, drug delivery, molecular diagnostics, microsystems and nanosystems.
- biophotonics – applying and manipulating light, usually laser light, for sensing or imaging properties of biological tissue.
- cellular and tissue engineering – studying the anatomy, biochemistry and mechanics of cellular and sub-cellular structures, developing technology to repair, replace or regenerate living tissues and developing methods for controlling cell and tissue growth in the laboratory.
- clinical engineering – applying the latest technology to health care and health care systems in hospitals.
- genomics and genetic engineering – mapping, sequencing and analyzing genomes (DNA), and applying molecular biology methods to manipulate the genetic material of cells, viruses and organisms.
- medical or biological imaging – combining knowledge of a physical phenomenon (for example, sound, radiation or magnetism) with electronic processing, analysis and display.
- molecular bioengineering – designing molecules for biomedical purposes and applying computational methods for simulating biomolecular interactions.
- systems physiology - studying how systems function in living organisms.
- therapeutic engineering – developing and discovering drugs and advanced materials and techniques for delivering drugs to local tissues with minimized side effects.

== Sources ==
- Bowles, Roger "Techcareers: Biomedical Equipment Technicians" TSTC Publishing
- Dyro, Joseph., Clinical Engineering Handbook (Biomedical Engineering).
- Khandpur, R. S. "Biomedical Instrumentation: Technology and Applications". McGraw Hills
- Northrop, Robert B., "Noninvasive Instrumentation and Measurement in Medical Diagnosis (Biomedical Engineering)".
- Webb, Andrew G., "Introduction to Biomedical Imaging (IEEE Press Series on Biomedical Engineering)".
- Yadin David, Wolf W. von Maltzahn, Michael R. Neuman, and Joseph D. Bronzino,. Clinical Engineering (Principles and Applications in Engineering).
- Villafañe, Carlos CBET: "Biomed: From the Student's Perspective" (ISBN 978-1-61539-663-4). www.Biomedtechnicians.com.
- Willson K., Ison K., Tabakov S., "Medical Equipment Management", CRC Press.
- Medical Equipment Inventory Management WHO(2011)
