= Postmarketing surveillance =

Medical monitoring

Postmarketing surveillance (PMS), also known as post market surveillance, is the practice of monitoring the safety of a pharmaceutical drug or medical device after it has been released on the market and is an important part of the science of pharmacovigilance. Since drugs and medical devices are approved on the basis of clinical trials, which involve relatively small numbers of people who have been selected for this purpose – meaning that they normally do not have other medical conditions which may exist in the general population – postmarketing surveillance can further refine, or confirm or deny, the safety of a drug or device after it is used in the general population by large numbers of people who have a wide variety of medical conditions.

Postmarketing surveillance uses a number of approaches to monitor drug and device safety, including spontaneous reporting databases, prescription event monitoring, electronic health records, patient registries, and record linkage between health databases. These data are reviewed to highlight potential safety concerns in a process known as data mining.

== National implementation ==
=== Canada ===
Health Canada is the regulatory body which approves drugs, and it has a division called "Marketed Health Products Directorate" (MHPD) which coordinates Canadian postmarketing surveillance.

=== European Union ===
The MDCG document "Guidance on post-market surveillance of medical devices and in vitro diagnostic medical devices" has been published in December of 2025 and replaces "MEDDEV 2.12-1 rev 8". It offers a comprehensive guidance on best practice for medical device post-market surveillance (materiovigilance) under the Medical Device Regulation.

The concept of post market surveillance is linked to the concepts of vigilance and market surveillance. A manufacturer of medical devices is required to report incidents (serious adverse events) to the national competent authority of the member state the company resides in. The Medical Device Regulation (EU) 2017/745 (MDR) provides in §2 the following definition of post-market surveillance:

‘post-market surveillance’ means all activities carried out by manufacturers in cooperation with other economic operators to institute and keep up to date a systematic procedure to proactively collect and review experience gained from devices they place on the market, make available on the market or put into service for the purpose of identifying any need to immediately apply any necessary corrective or preventive actions;

Further requirements on PMS are given in §83 of the MDR; §84 details PMS Plan requirements and references Section 1.1 of Annex III of the MDR; §85 details the PMS report, while §86 describes the contents of the Periodic Safety Update Report (PSUR). The PMS Plan, PMS Report and PSUR are part of the technical documentation.

Similar provisions on Post-Market Surveillance are found in the European regulation on in vitro diagnostic medical devices (IVDR).

The MDCG Guideline 2023-3 "Questions and Answers on vigilance terms and concepts as outlined in the Regulation (EU) 2017/745 on medical devices" provides further clarification on the topic.

=== United Kingdom ===
The Medicines and Healthcare products Regulatory Agency (MHRA) and the Commission on Human Medicines (CHM) jointly operate the Yellow Card Scheme, which was one of the first examples of a pharmacovigilance scheme, aimed at mitigating adverse drug reactions (ADRs).

=== United States ===
Postmarketing surveillance is overseen by the Food and Drug Administration (FDA), which operates a system of passive surveillance called MedWatch, to which doctors or the general public can voluntarily report adverse reactions to drugs and medical devices. The FDA also conducts active surveillance of certain regulated products. For example, the FDA may monitor safety and effectiveness of medical devices through either a Post-Approval Study or through a 522 Postmarket Surveillance Study. With respect to regulation, two terms are defined: Postmarketing requirements are studies and clinical trials that sponsors are required to conduct and postmarketing commitments are studies or clinical trials that a sponsor has agreed to conduct, but that are not required by a statue or regulation.

== See also ==
- Medical device reporting
- List of withdrawn drugs
