= Expert Review of Medical Devices =

- Discipline: Biomedical engineering
- Language: English
- Edited by: Sophia Maprayil

Publication details
- History: 2004-present
- Publisher: Informa
- Frequency: Monthly
- Impact factor: 1.784 (2013)

Standard abbreviations
- ISO 4: Expert Rev. Med. Devices

Indexing
- CODEN: ERMDDX
- ISSN: 1743-4440 (print); 1744-8328 (web)
- OCLC no.: 475164130

Links
- Journal homepage; Online access; Online archive

Expert Review of Medical Devices is a monthly peer-reviewed medical journal covering research on the clinical use of devices. It was established in 2004 and is published by Informa. According to the Journal Citation Reports, the journal has a 2013 impact factor of 1.784.
