= Regulation (EU) 2017/745 =

Political regulation

Regulation
- European Union regulation
- Title: Regulation (EU) 2017/745 of the European Parliament and of the Council of 5 April 2017 on medical devices, amending Directive 2001/83/EC, Regulation (EC) No 178/2002 and Regulation (EC) No 1223/2009 and repealing Council Directives 90/385/EEC and 93/42/EEC (Text with EEA relevance)
- Made by: Council
- Made under: TFEU/art 294 par 6
- Journal reference: L117, 5 May 2017 pp. 1–175

History
- Date made: 5 April 2017
- Entry into force: 25 May 2017
- Implementation date: (new date) 26 May 2021

Other legislation
- Replaces: Directive 90/385/EEC, Directive 93/42/EEC
- Amends: Directive 2001/83/EC, Regulation (EC) No 178/2002, and Regulation (EC) No 1223/2009

Regulation (EU) 2017/745 is a regulation of the European Union on the clinical investigation and placing on the market of medical devices for human use. It repealed Directive 93/42/EEC on Medical Devices (MDD) and Directive 90/385/EEC on active implantable medical devices (AIMDD).

The regulation was published on 5 April 2017 and came into force on 25 May 2017, with effect from 26 May 2021.

== Changes ==
Changes compared to the Medical Device Directive include changes in device classification and device scope, stricter oversight of manufacturers by notified bodies, introduction of the "Person Responsible for Regulatory Compliance" (PRRC) and of the economic operator concept, the requirement of Unique Device Identification marking for devices, EUDAMED registration (see below), UDI requirements, and increased postmarketing surveillance activities.

== Scope and classification ==
Compared to the MDD, the scope of the MDR has been expanded to cover not only the active implantable medical devices previously covered by the Active Implantable Medical Device Directive 90/385/EWG (AIMDD) but also a range of products without an intended medical purpose. This category includes devices similar to medical devices, as listed in Annex XVI.

The classification rules of Annex VIII of the MDR have been expanded, compared to the MDD, to now 22 rules. Classification changes relate to software (rule 11), nanomaterials (rule 19), and substance-based medical devices (rule 21).

=== Reusable surgical instruments ===
Reusable surgical instruments are now included in their own category, often called "I R". As per § 120(3) of the regulation, aspects relating to their re-usability, are under the scope of Notified Body review starting 26 May 2024. This includes aspects relating to reprocessing and (re-)sterilization. This means that, with regard to Notified Body oversight, reusable surgical instruments are now treated similarly to sterile class I products and class I devices with a measuring function.

=== Products without an intended medical purpose ===
The scope of the MDR includes products without an intended medical purpose, that are similar in principle to medical devices but without a specific medical intended purpose. Annex XVI of the MDR lists the six categories of products that are covered by this scope. The groups includes devices such as cosmetic contact lenses, tattoo removal lasers, equipment for liposuction, and others. Instead of showing a clinical benefit, manufacturers of such products are required to demonstrate their performance and safety in the clinical evaluation.

== Economic operator roles ==
The MDR in §2 (35) now defines several different roles for economic operators in relation to medical devices. The obligations of economic operators are detailed in the following sections:

- §10 - Manufacturer
- §11 - Authorised Representative
- §13 - Importer
- §14 - Distributor

Manufacturers, authorised representatives and importers have to register in the EUDAMED database to receive a Single Registration Number (SRN); only distributors of medical devices do not have to register.

== Person responsible for regulatory compliance ==
The MDR in § 15 introduces the role of the "person responsible for regulatory compliance" (PRRC), that manufacturers and authorized representatives will have to have available within their organisation. The PRRC is assigned several duties and responsibilities, including making sure postmarketing surveillance obligations are fulfilled. Persons taking on the role and responsibilities of a PRRC have to meet certain qualitifcations with regard to education and experience. Further details on the PRRC are given in the EU guidance MDCG 2019–7.

== General safety and performance requirements ==
The "General Safety and Performance Requirements" (GSPR) of the MDR replace the "Essential Requirements" (ER) of the MDD. Annex I of the MDR lists 23 requirements, divided in three chapters:

- General requirements (1–9)
- Requirements regarding design and manufacture (10–22)
- Requirements regarding the information supplied with the device (23)

Compared to the MDD ER, the MDR GSPR have been expanded, e.g. with regards to devices for lay use, IT security, and devices without a medical purpose. Manufacturers are expected to utilize harmonized standards and common requirements to demonstrate conformance to the GSPR.

== European database on medical devices ==
The EUropean DAtabase on MEdical Devices (EUDAMED) is a database to collect and publish information on medical devices and in-vitro-diagnostica.

EUDAMED has six modules:

- Actors registration
- UDI/Devices registration
- Notified Bodies and Certificates
- Clinical Investigations and performance studies
- Vigilance and post-market surveillance
- Market Surveillance

Data on economic operators, devices registration and certificates are available to the public. The database will allow to link manufacturer's certification and Single Registration Number (SRN) as well as the Basic UDI. The so-called "Summary of Safety and Clinical Performance" (SSCP), required for some high-risk medical devices, will also be accessible to the public through the database. More details on the operation of EUDAMED are given in Commission Implementing Regulation (EU) 2021/2078. A similar database is the Global Unique Device Identification Database (GUDID) of the FDA.

As a key to EUDAMED, the MDR introduces the Basic UDI-DI as unique device identifier. A medical device (including system- and procedure packs and IVD) needs to have an assigned Basic UDI-DI and needs to be registered in the UDI/Device part of EUDAMED. Devices with their own UDI-DI from the same manufacturer with same intended purpose, risk class and essential design and manufacturing characteristics can be grouped under one Basic UDI. Legacy devices that do not have a previously assigned Basic UDI-DI, they are assigned an EUDAMED-DI for the purpose of registration in EUDAMED. Instead of the UDI-DI, an EUDAMED ID can be assigned for registration.

== Medical Device Coordination Group ==
In accordance with §103 of the MDR, the Medical Device Coordination Group (MDCG) has been established. The MDCG and its sub-groups publish guidances that provide clarification and support to national competent authorities, notified bodies and economic operators on the details of the implementation of the MDR and IVDR. The members of the MDCG are experts appointed by the EU member states.

== History ==
=== Origins and background ===
The previous legal framework included the 'New Approach' directive on medical devices (MDD) that had become an accepted industry standard and been updated by Directive 2007/47/EC. In 2010, the French authorities recalled breast implants manufactured by the French company Poly Implant Prothèse in what became known as the PIP scandal. The company had received a CE certificate by Notified Body TÜV Rheinland but used un-certified silicone for the products. This incident created significant public concern over the adequacy of the regulatory framework in ensuring medical device safety. This led to the development of an action plan (the so-called PIP Joint Action Plan) in 2012 by the European Union to strengthen market surveillance and develop new regulations for medical devices. The revision of European medical device regulations through by the repeal of the MDD and introduction of the MDR aimed to address existing gaps, improve Notified Body oversight, market surveillance, and enhance patient safety.

=== Implementation date ===
The regulation was adopted, and came into force, in 2017. The date by which the Regulation was to be fully implemented by replacing the previous directives was originally defined as 26 May 2020. Following the international health emergency COVID-19, the European Commission and the European Parliament decided in April 2020 to postpone the deadline by one year to 26 May 2021.

Additional provisions for the transition from MDD to MDR are found in Article 120 of the regulation. Due to certain issues, some additional transition timelines were implemented in 2023, amending Article 120 and allowing for some delays in re-certification up until 2028 for class III and IIB implantable devices, and for 2027 for some others, under certain circumstances; the "sell-off" provision of MDD-licensed devices, previously May 2025, was also removed.

=== Other changes and amendments ===
A requirement for manufacturers on notifying authorities digitally about (potential) medical device supply chain disruptions was added to the regulation in 2024 (§10a).

In October 2024, the European Parliament has adopted a resolution to update the Medical Devices and In Vitro Diagnostics Regulations to prevent potential product shortages, and proposing a timeline of Q1 2025 for the EU Commission to present delegated and implementing acts and proposed changes to the regulations. This decision responds to manufacturers' concerns about meeting transition deadlines.

== See also ==
- Regulation (EU) 2017/746 on in vitro diagnostic medical devices (IVDR)
- Medical device design
