= Biotechnology consulting =

- Type: assisting organization
- Purpose: biotechnology biological sciences

Biotechnology consulting (or biotech consulting) refers to the practice of assisting organizations involved in research and commercialization of biotechnology in improving their methods and efficiency of production, and approaches to R&D. This assistance is usually provided in the form of specialized technological advice and sharing of expertise. Both start-up and established organizations would hire biotechnology consultants mainly to receive an independent and professional advice from key opinion leaders, individuals with extensive knowledge and experience in a particular area of biotechnology or biological sciences, and, often, to outsource their projects for implementation by well qualified individuals. Large management consulting firms would often be able to provide technological advice as well, depending on the qualifications of their consulting team. With the growth of pharmaceutical companies, biotechnology consulting has recently developed into an industry of its own and separated from the management consulting industry that traditionally also provides technological advice on R&D projects to various industries. This has also been fueled by the impact various conflicts of interests can have on commercialization when biotechnology organizations contract services from academic institutions or government scientists

This is exemplified by the successful emergence of many consulting companies dedicated exclusively to servicing the biotech industry. Occasionally, university professors and Phd students engage in biotechnology consulting, either commercially or free of charge.

A special type of consulting is patent strategy and management consulting or simply patent consulting which specifically emphasizes on the scope of patent rights versus R&D in industry. It also assets successful commercialization of patentable matter. The primary aim of patent consulting company is to assist various small, medium and large corporation in realizing their research project toward successful patent registration with minimized danger of infringement and other risks that patent registrations may be subjected to prior to commercialization. One example of patent consulting firm is The Patent World.
