= Notified body =

European Union regulatory body

CE Mark

A notified body, in the European Union, is an organisation that has been designated by a member state to assess the conformity of certain products, before being placed on the EU market, with the applicable essential technical requirements. These essential requirements are publicised in European directives or regulations.

Manufacturers may voluntarily apply harmonised European standards to demonstrate conformity with the requirements covered by those standards. However, the application of harmonised standards does not replace mandatory third-party conformity assessment where such assessment is required by EU legislation. Conformity assessment can include inspection and examination of a product, its design, and the manufacturing environment and processes associated with it. For example, a notified body may designate that a medical device conforms to the essential requirements of the Medical Devices Regulation (MDR (EU) 2017/745) which defines the applicable legislation, including the general safety and performance requirements, for medical devices. With this type examination certificate, (and ensuring the product also satisfies all other applicable regulations), the manufacturer can generate its declaration of conformity and label the product with the CE Mark, which is required for distribution and sale in the EU. Additionally, the EU member state accrediting the notified body will then inform the European Commission that the product complies with the essential requirements (or not).

Notified bodies are designated by the competent national authorities of EU Member States following an assessment of their competence, independence, impartiality, and ability to perform the relevant conformity assessment procedures. Accreditation may be used to support the assessment of a conformity assessment body's competence, but accreditation and notification are distinct processes. Upon definition of standards and regulations, the accrediting body may allow a notified body to provide verification and certification services. These services are meant to ensure and assess compliance to the previously defined regulations, but also to provide an official certification mark or a declaration of conformity.

== Criticism and improvement ==
The notified bodies system used by the European Union has been publicly criticized in some capacity since at least 2008 for issues such as:

- "a lack of uniformity in certification procedures and in the application of harmonised standards";
- "the varying levels of expertise among notified bodies," including "differences in test results"; and
- "encouraging 'forum shopping' by sponsors to identify those notified bodies with the most lax operating standards."

Discussion of further expanding coordination groups of notified bodies for different product areas, improving marketing surveillance, and making participation in standardization and coordination activities mandatory began within EU member states. However, more criticism would arise out of the Poly Implant Prothèse (PIP) scandal in early 2010, when media revealed that the French manufacturer of silicone gel breast implants had been using unapproved in-house manufactured industrial-grade instead of medical-grade silicone for most of its implants. Investigators also brought criticism down on notified body TÜV Rheinland for issuing a certificate of quality for a production process that didn't include the in-house industrial-grade silicone. However, TÜV stated "its remit was to check the production process, not the content of the silicone."

The revelation had a ripple effect, causing both more criticism about the responsibilities of notified bodies and the regulatory process in general and more corrective action. The Central Management Committee was created in September 2010 "to develop the effectiveness of the regulatory system on medical devices in the EU by improving decision making among the national regulatory authorities." Then in February 2012, European Health and Consumer Policy Commissioner John Dalli called upon EU member states to take a hard look at the regulatory system, including how notified bodies play a part. His recommendations included properly verifying whether a notified body is capable of accurately assessing medical devices, improving how conformity assessments are conducted, and developing tools to enhance medical device traceability. The European Commission acted, that September revealing its proposed changes to medical device regulation, including expanded requirements on notified bodies, to be published in 2014 and go into effect in 2017. However, the commission also opted to instate additional reforms — separate from its draft regulations — that would go into effect much sooner, asking notified bodies to perform unannounced visits to manufacturers and expand their device testing standards. At the same time the NB-MED (European Forum of Notified Bodies Medical Devices) coordination revised their code of conduct due to criticism.

In late 2013 and early 2014, a French court ordered (and later upheld its decision) that notified body TÜV Rheinland pay restitution to those affected by the PIP scandal. However, this decision and a similar case in Germany has created questions about how much liability should be applied to notified bodies for patient devices found to be dangerous despite previous notified body assessment. The German case against TÜV was dismissed initially and on appeal in district and regional courts, and an appeal to a German federal court resulted in referral of the case to the Court of Justice of the European Union (CJEU) for clarification "on three issues on the interpretation of the Medical Devices Directive." Additionally, the original restitution decision by French courts was appealed and overturned on July 2, 2015, forcing affected patients to return their interim compensation, leaving many patients without recourse.

As of February 2016, the German case is ongoing, waiting for CJEU input. Rudd-Clarke and Page postulated in December 2015 that if "the CJEU decides that notified bodies are under a duty to protect patients, the practical effects could be that the CE certification process slows down, which is likely to have a detrimental impact on the cost for manufacturers of getting a product to market, while notified bodies may face a significantly increased litigation risk for failure to comply with their duties."

Regulations governing medical device manufacturers and Notified Bodies operating in the medical device field were tightened with the Medical Device Regulation of 2017.

== NANDO database ==
The European Commission maintains an online database which includes all designated notified bodies: NANDO (New Approach Notified and Designated Organisations) Information System. This searchable and publicly available Nando database contains different lists of notified bodies, including the identification number and contact details of each notified body as well as the tasks for which it has been notified. The lists as well as the designated tasks for each notified body are subject to regular update: as the notification of notified bodies (and their withdrawal, suspension, reinstatement) is the responsibility of the notifying EU Member State (and not of the European Commission), the data in this Nando database is provided by the designating authorities of that EU Member States.

The database can be used to verify the status (valid/withdrawn/expired/suspended) of a notified body related to a particular European Directive or Regulation as well as the associated designated scope of tasks related to conformity assessment procedures set out in that Directive or Regulation..

In the medical device sector, information about notified bodies and their certificates is also recorded in EUDAMED, the European Database on Medical Devices. While NANDO provides information about the designation and scope of notified bodies, EUDAMED contains information on certificates issued under the Medical Devices Regulation (MDR) and In Vitro Diagnostic Medical Regulation (IVDR).

== See also ==
- Accreditation
- Deutsches Institut für Bautechnik
