= Medical device =

Device to be used for medical purposes

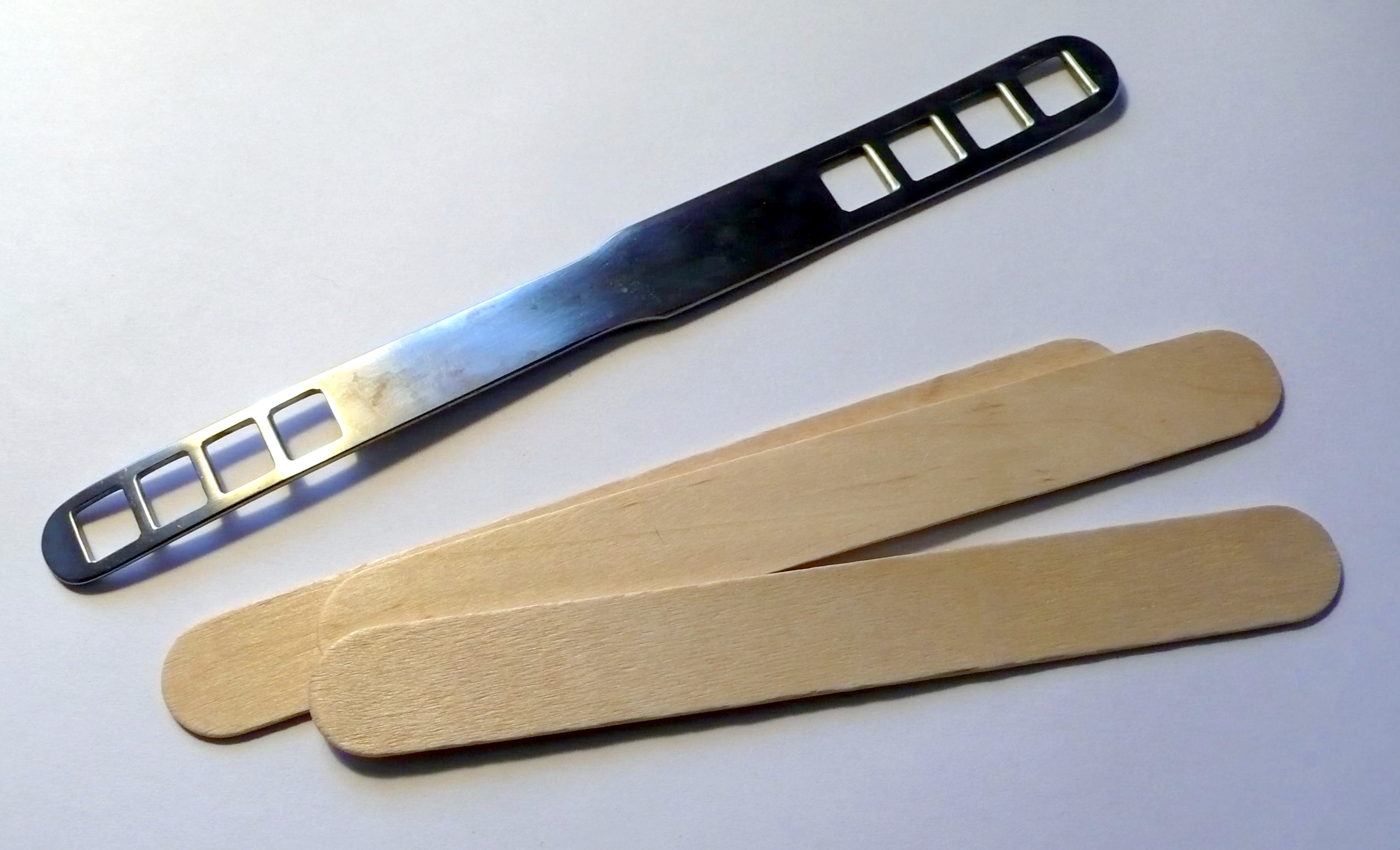
Tongue depressor, a Class I medical device in the United States

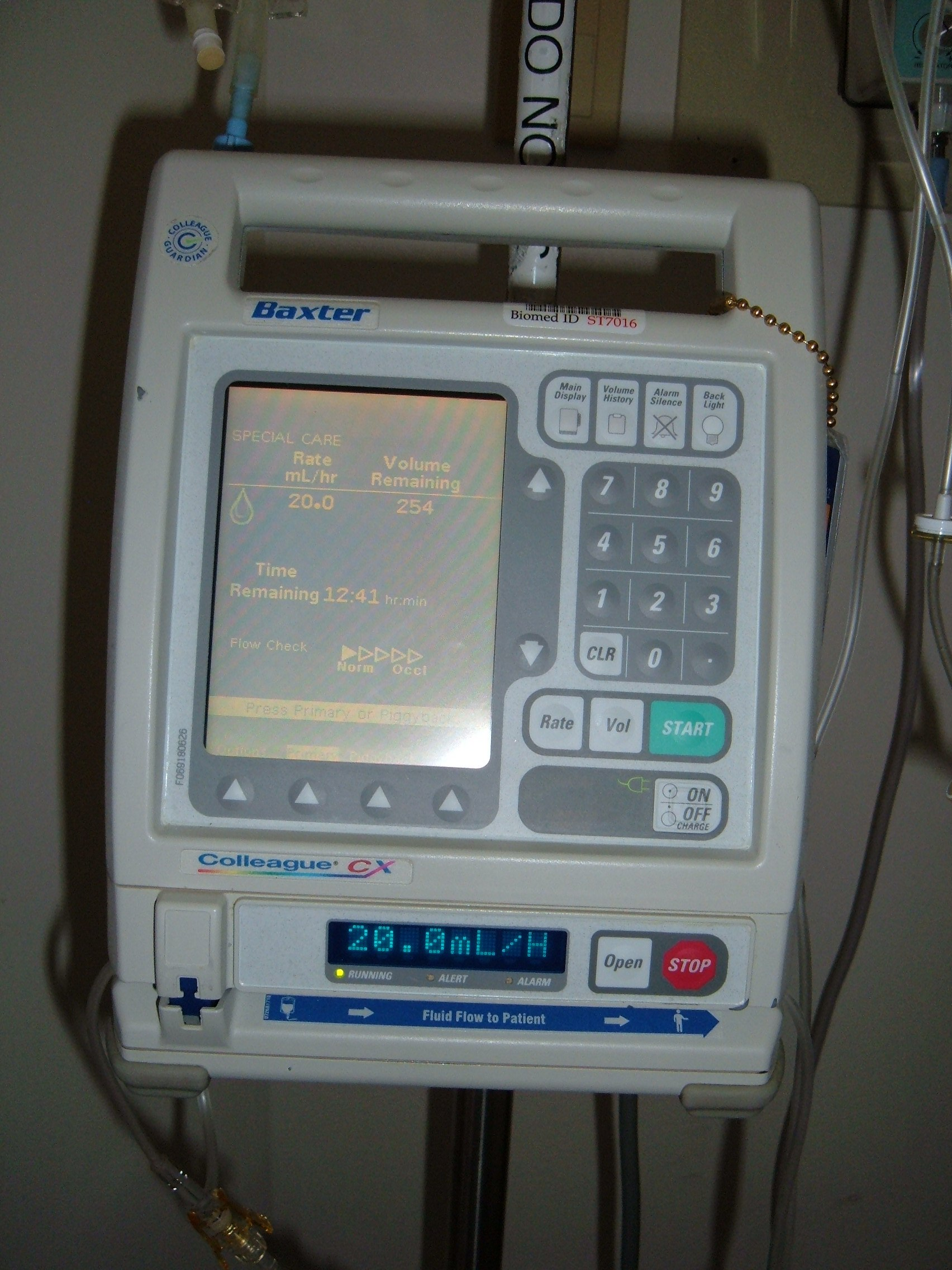
Infusion pump, a Class II medical device in the United States

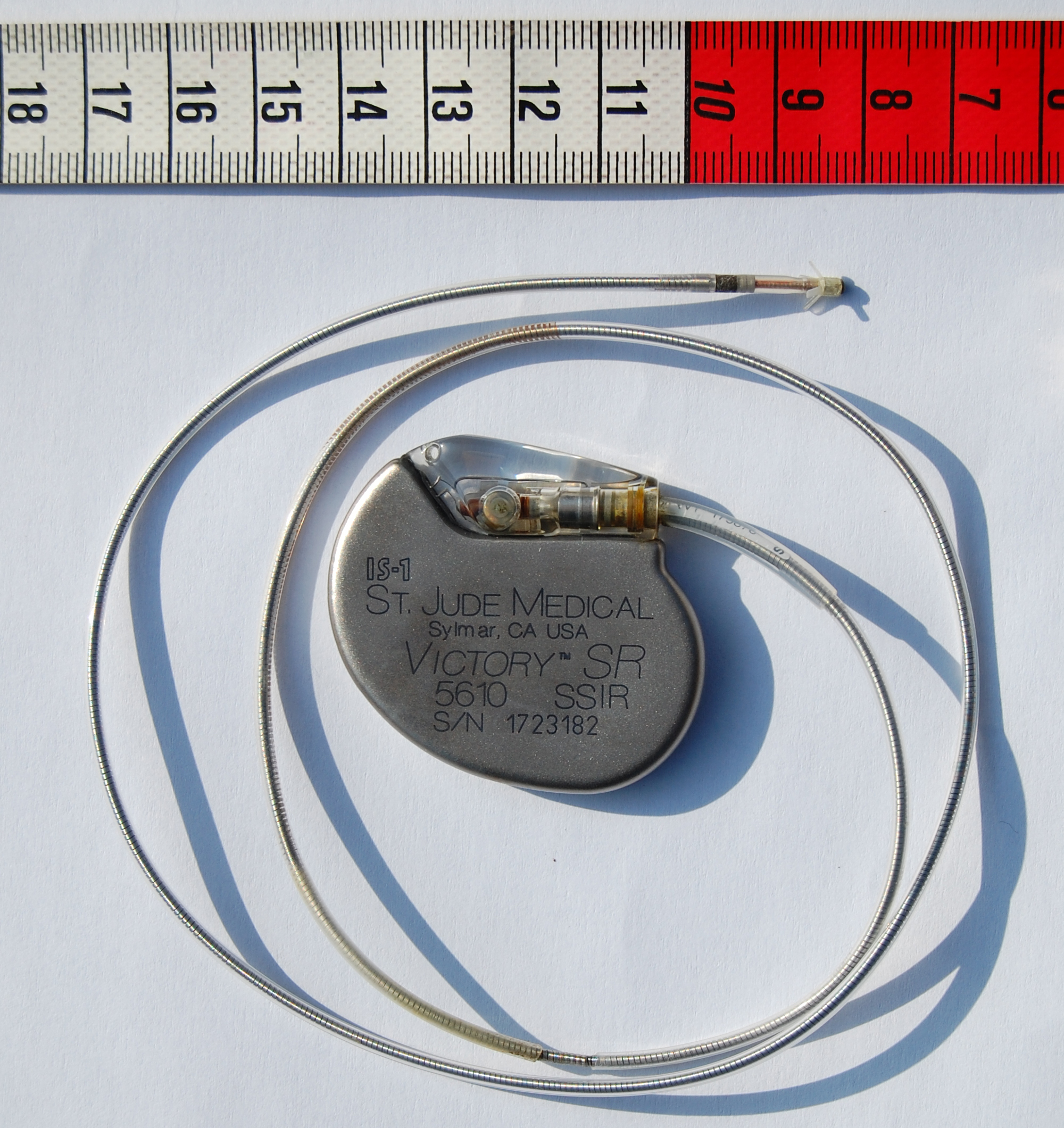
Artificial pacemaker, a Class III device in the United States

A medical device is any device intended to be used for medical purposes. In countries around the world, medical devices must be proven safe and effective before they are marketed. As a general rule, the higher the associated risk of the device the more testing is required to establish safety and efficacy. Further, as associated risk increases the potential benefit to the patient must also increase.

Discovery of what would be considered a medical device by modern standards dates as far back as c. 7000 BC in Baluchistan where Neolithic dentists used flint-tipped drills and bowstrings. Study of archeology and Roman medical literature also indicate that many types of medical devices were in widespread use during the time of ancient Rome. In the United States, it was not until the Federal Food, Drug, and Cosmetic Act (FD&C Act) in 1938 that medical devices were regulated at all. It was not until later in 1976 that the Medical Device Amendments to the FD&C Act established medical device regulation and oversight as we know it today in the United States. Medical device regulation in Europe as we know it today came into effect in 1993 by what is collectively known as the Medical Device Directive (MDD). On May 26, 2017, the Medical Device Regulation (MDR) replaced the MDD.

Medical devices vary in both their intended use and indications for use. Examples range from simple, low-risk devices such as tongue depressors, medical thermometers, disposable gloves, and bedpans to complex, high-risk devices that are implanted and sustain life. Examples of high-risk devices include artificial hearts, pacemakers, joint replacements, and CT scans. The design of medical devices constitutes a major segment of the field of biomedical engineering.

The global medical device market was estimated to be between $220 and US$250 billion in 2013. The United States controls ≈40% of the global market followed by Europe (25%), Japan (15%), and the rest of the world (20%). Although collectively Europe has a larger share, Japan has the second largest country market share. The largest market shares in Europe (in order of market share size) belong to Germany, Italy, France, and the United Kingdom. The rest of the world comprises regions like (in no particular order) Australia, Canada, China, India, and Iran.

== Definition ==
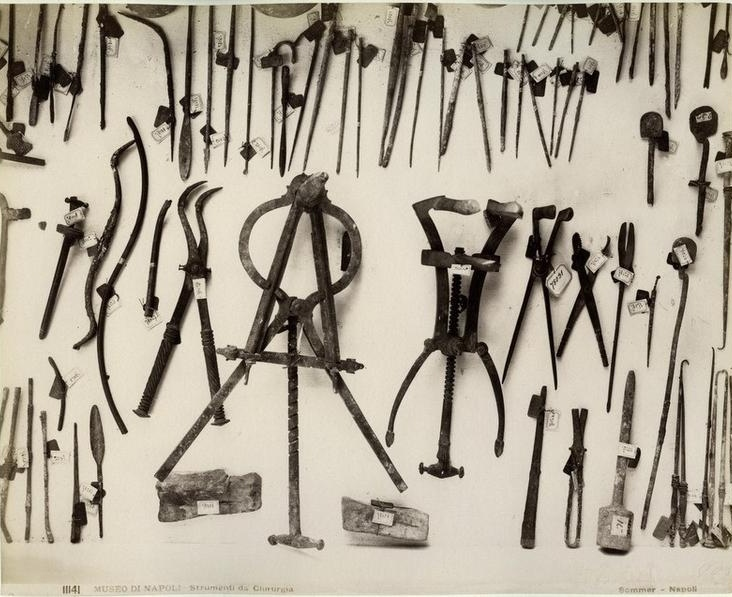
Medical devices were used for surgery in ancient Rome.

A global definition for medical device is difficult to establish because there are numerous regulatory bodies worldwide overseeing the marketing of medical devices. Although these bodies often collaborate and discuss the definition in general, there are subtle differences in wording that prevent a global harmonization of the definition of a medical device, thus the appropriate definition of a medical device depends on the region. Often a portion of the definition of a medical device is intended to differentiate between medical devices and drugs, as the regulatory requirements of the two are different. Definitions also often recognize In vitro diagnostics as a subclass of medical devices and establish accessories as medical devices.

== Definitions by region ==
=== United States (Food and Drug Administration) ===
Section 201(h) of the Federal Food Drug & Cosmetic (FD&C) Act defines a device as an "instrument, apparatus, implement, machine, contrivance, implant, in vitro reagent, or other similar or related article, including a component part, or accessory which is:

- recognized in the official National Formulary, or the United States Pharmacopoeia, or any supplement to them
- Intended for use in the diagnosis of disease or other conditions, or in the cure, mitigation, treatment, or prevention of disease, in man or other animals, or
- Intended to affect the structure or any function of the body of man or other animals, and

which does not achieve its primary intended purposes through chemical action within or on the body of man or other animals and which is not dependent upon being metabolized for the achievement of its primary intended purposes. The term 'device' does not include software functions excluded pursuant to section 520(o)."

=== European Union ===
According to Article 1 of Council Directive 93/42/EEC, on 26 May 2021, the definition of a medical device in the European Union is now governed by the Medical Devices Regulation (MDR) (EU) 2017/745. Under the MDR, a medical device is defined as any instrument, apparatus, appliance, software, implant, reagent, material, or other article intended by the manufacturer to be used, alone or in combination, for human beings for one or more of the following specific medical purposes:

- diagnosis, prevention, monitoring, treatment or alleviation of disease,
- diagnosis, monitoring, treatment, alleviation of or compensation for an injury or handicap,
- investigation, replacement or modification of the anatomy or of a physiological process,
- control of conception,

and which does not achieve its principal intended action in or on the human body by pharmacological, immunological or metabolic means, but which may be assisted in its function by such means;"

==== EU Legal framework ====
Based on the New Approach, rules that relate to safety and performance of medical devices were harmonised in the EU in the 1990s. The New Approach, defined in a European Council Resolution of May 1985, represents an innovative way of technical harmonisation. It aims to remove technical barriers to trade and dispel the consequent uncertainty for economic operators, to facilitate free movement of goods inside the EU.

The previous core legal framework consisted of three directives, repealed by the two regulations that replaced them:

- Directive 90/385/EEC regarding active implantable medical devices
- Directive 93/42/EEC regarding medical devices
- Directive 98/79/EC regarding in vitro diagnostic medical devices, repealed with effect from 26 May 2022 by the In Vitro Diagnostic Medical Devices Regulation (IVDR), with the exceptions listed in Article 112 of that regulation.

They aim at ensuring a high level of protection of human health and safety and the good functioning of the Single Market. These three main directives have been supplemented over time by several modifying and implementing directives, including the last technical revision brought about by Directive 2007/47 EC.

The government of each Member State must appoint a competent authority responsible for medical devices. The competent authority (CA) is a body with authority to act on behalf of the member state to ensure that member state government transposes requirements of medical device directives into national law and applies them. The CA reports to the minister of health in the member state. The CA in one Member State has no jurisdiction in any other member state, but exchanges information and tries to reach common positions.

In the UK, for example, the Medicines and Healthcare products Regulatory Agency (MHRA) acted as a CA. In Italy it is the Ministero Salute (Ministry of Health) Medical devices must not be mistaken with medicinal products. In the EU, all medical devices must be identified with the CE mark. The conformity of a medium or high risk medical device with relevant regulations is also assessed by an external entity, the Notified Body, before it can be placed on the market.

In September 2012, the European Commission proposed new legislation aimed at enhancing safety, traceability, and transparency. The regulation was adopted in 2017.

The current core legal framework consists of two regulations, replacing the previous three directives:

- The Medical Devices Regulation (MDR (EU) 2017/745)
- The In Vitro Diagnostic medical devices regulation (IVDR (EU) 2017/746)

The two regulations are supplemented by several guidances developed by the Medical Devices Coordination Group (MDCG).

=== Japan ===
Article 2, Paragraph 4, of the Pharmaceutical Affairs Law (PAL) defines medical devices as "instruments and apparatus intended for use in diagnosis, cure or prevention of diseases in humans or other animals; intended to affect the structure or functions of the body of man or other animals."

=== Rest of the world ===
==== Canada ====
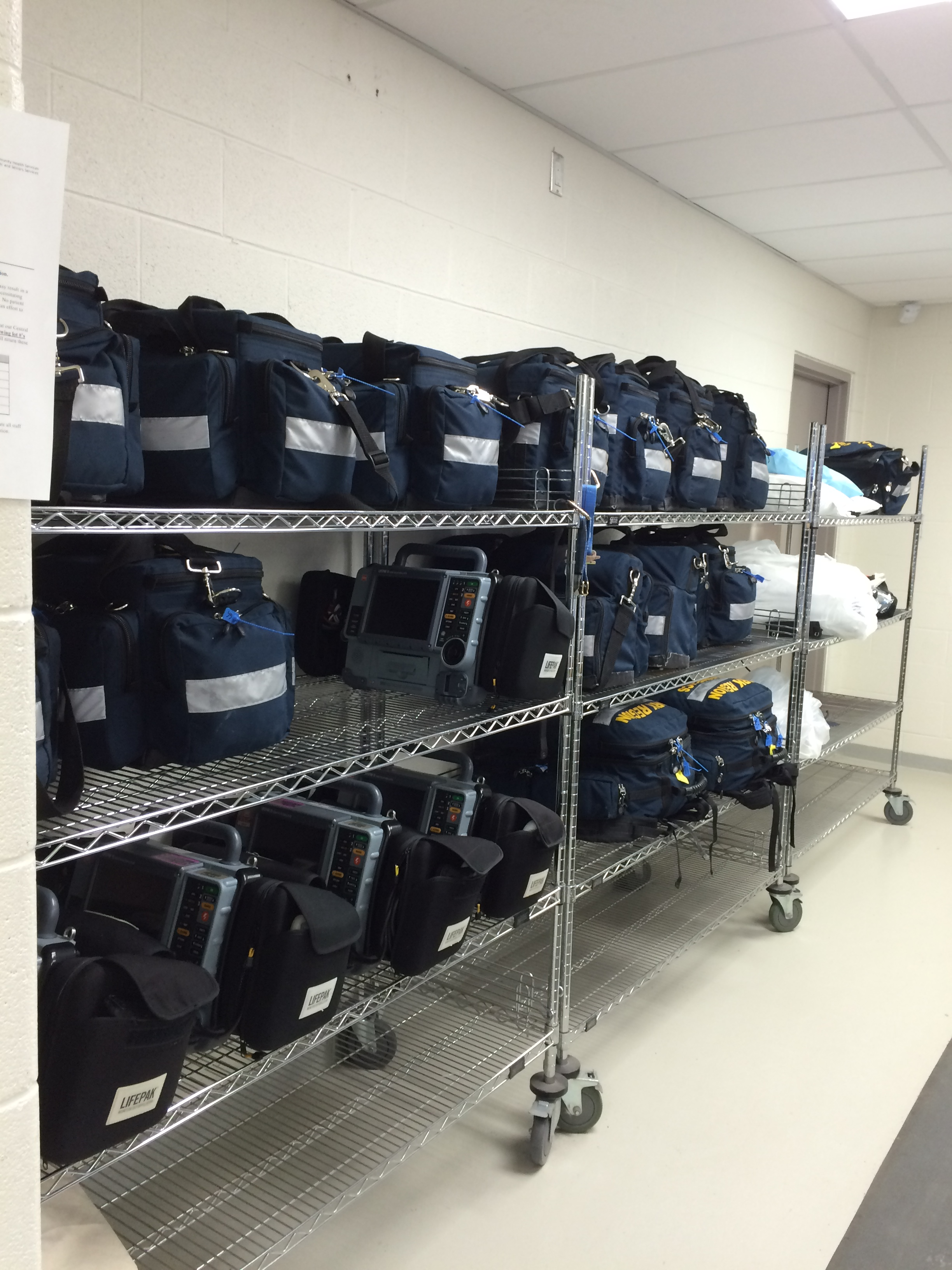
Bags of medical supplies and defibrillators at the York Region EMS Logistics Headquarters in Ontario, Canada

The term medical device, as defined in the Food and Drugs Act, is "any article, instrument, apparatus or contrivance, including any component, part or accessory thereof, manufactured, sold or represented for use in: the diagnosis, treatment, mitigation or prevention of a disease, disorder or abnormal physical state, or its symptoms, in a human being; the restoration, correction or modification of a body function or the body structure of a human being; the diagnosis of pregnancy in a human being; or the care of a human being during pregnancy and at and after the birth of a child, including the care of the child. It also includes a contraceptive device but does not include a drug."

The term covers a wide range of health or medical instruments used in the treatment, mitigation, diagnosis or prevention of a disease or abnormal physical condition. Health Canada reviews medical devices to assess their safety, effectiveness, and quality before authorizing their sale in Canada. According to the Act, medical device does not include any device that is intended for use in relation to animals.

==== India ====
India has introduced National Medical Device Policy 2023. However, certain medical devices are notified as DRUGS under the Drugs & Cosmetics Act. Section 3 (b) (iv) relating to definition of "drugs" holds that "Devices intended for internal or external use in the diagnosis, treatment, mitigation or prevention of disease or disorder in human beings or animals" are also drugs. As of April 2022, 14 classes of devices are classified as drugs.

== Regulation and oversight ==
In 2017, the World Health Organization published a global model regulatory framework for medical devices, including in vitro diagnostic medical devices. It recommends guiding principles, harmonized definitions, and attributes for effective and efficient regulation, drawing on international guidance developed by the Global Harmonization Task Force and its successor, the International Medical Device Regulators Forum.

=== Risk classification ===
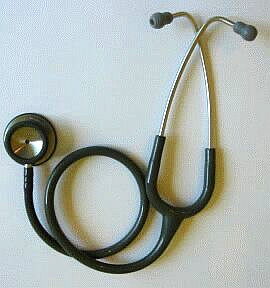
A stethoscope (U.S. FDA product code BZS), a popular Class I medical device as determined by the U.S. FDA, ubiquitous in hospitals.

The regulatory authorities recognize different classes of medical devices based on their potential for harm if misused, design complexity, and their use characteristics. Each country or region defines these categories in different ways. The authorities also recognize that some devices are provided in combination with drugs, and regulation of these combination products takes this factor into consideration.

Classifying medical devices based on their risk is essential for maintaining patient and staff safety while simultaneously facilitating the marketing of medical products. By establishing different risk classifications, lower risk devices, for example, a stethoscope or tongue depressor, are not required to undergo the same level of testing that higher risk devices such as artificial pacemakers undergo. Under the GHTF model, regulatory controls increase from Class A to Class D and may include independently audited quality management systems, review of technical documentation and clinical evidence, and post-market evaluation.

Reusable medical devices may require cleaning, disinfection or sterilization between uses, commonly undertaken as part of sterile processing, using the Spaulding classification to determine the necessary level of decontamination prior to and between patient use.

=== Classification by region ===
==== United States ====
Under the Food, Drug, and Cosmetic Act, the U.S. Food and Drug Administration recognizes three classes of medical devices, based on the level of control necessary to assure safety and effectiveness.

- Class I
- Class II
- Class III

Device Class	Risk	FDA Regulatory Control	Examples
Class I	Low Risk	General Controls	Tongue Depressor, Electric Toothbrush, Bandages, Hospital Beds
Class II	Medium Risk	General Controls + Pre-Market Notification (510K)	Catheters, Contact Lenses, Pregnancy Test Kits
Class III	High Risk	General Controls + Special controls (510K) + Pre-Market Approval (PMA)	Pacemakers, Defibrillators, Implanted prosthetics, Breast implants

The classification procedures are described in the Code of Federal Regulations, Title 21, part 860 (usually known as 21 CFR 860).

Class I devices are subject to the least regulatory control and are not intended to help support or sustain life or be substantially important in preventing impairment to human health, and may not present an unreasonable risk of illness or injury. Examples of Class I devices include elastic bandages, examination gloves, and hand-held surgical instruments.

Class II devices are subject to special labeling requirements, mandatory performance standards and postmarket surveillance. Examples of Class II devices include acupuncture needles, powered wheelchairs, infusion pumps, air purifiers, surgical drapes, stereotaxic navigation systems, and surgical robots.

Class III devices are usually those that support or sustain human life, are of substantial importance in preventing impairment of human health, or present a potential, unreasonable risk of illness or injury and require premarket approval. Examples of Class III devices include implantable pacemakers, pulse generators, HIV diagnostic tests, automated external defibrillators, and endosseous implants.

==== European Union (EU) and European Free Trade Association (EFTA) ====
The classification of medical devices in the European Union is outlined in Article IX of the Council Directive 93/42/EEC and Annex VIII of the EU medical device regulation. There are basically four classes, ranging from low risk to high risk, Classes I, IIa, IIb, and III (this excludes in vitro diagnostics including software, which fall in four classes: from A (lowest risk) to D (highest risk)):

Device Class	Risk	Examples
Class I (Class I, Class Is, Class Im, Class Ir)	Low Risk	Tongue Depressor, Wheelchair, Spectacles
Class IIA	Medium Risk	Hearing aids
Class IIB	Medium to High Risk	Ventilators, Infusion pumps
Class III	High Risk	Pacemakers, Defibrillators, Implanted prosthetics, Breast implants

Class I Devices: Non-invasive, everyday devices or equipment. Class I devices are generally low risk and can include bandages, compression hosiery, or walking aids. Such devices require only for the manufacturer to complete a Technical File.

Class Is Devices: Class Is devices are similarly non-invasive devices, however this sub-group extends to include sterile devices. Examples of Class Is devices include stethoscopes, examination gloves, colostomy bags, or oxygen masks. These devices also require a technical file, with the added requirement of an application to a European Notified Body for certification of manufacturing in conjunction with sterility standards.

Class Im Devices: This refers chiefly to similarly low-risk measuring devices. Included in this category are: thermometers, droppers, and non-invasive blood pressure measuring devices. Once again the manufacturer must provide a technical file and be certified by a European Notified Body for manufacturing in accordance with metrology regulations.

Class Ir Devices: Reusable surgical instruments include devices like ophthalmic scissors or needle holders. Under the MDR, a manufacturer of Class Ir devices must be certified by a Notified Body with regard to reusability aspects.

Class IIa Devices: Class IIa devices generally constitute low to medium risk and pertain mainly to devices installed within the body in the short term. Class IIa devices are those which are installed within the body for only between 60 minutes and 30 days. Examples include hearing-aids, blood transfusion tubes, and catheters. Requirements include technical files and a conformity test carried out by a European Notified Body.

Class IIb Devices: Slightly more complex than IIa devices, class IIb devices are generally medium to high risk and will often be devices installed within the body for periods of 30 days or longer. Examples include ventilators and intensive care monitoring equipment. Identical compliance route to Class IIa devices with an added requirement of a device type examination by a Notified Body. Note: Some parts of the regulations differentiate between Class IIb and Class IIb implantable devices, that is, some rules of the MDR apply specifically to Class IIb implantable and Class III devices, e.g. Article 52 paragraph 4 of the MDR.

Class III Devices: Class III devices are strictly high risk devices. Examples include balloon catheters, prosthetic heart valves, pacemakers, etc. The steps to approval here include a full quality assurance system audit, along with examination of both the device's design and the device itself by a European Notified Body.

The authorization of medical devices is guaranteed by a Declaration of Conformity. This declaration is issued by the manufacturer itself, but for products in Class Is, Im, Ir, IIa, IIb or III, it must be verified by a Certificate of Conformity issued by a Notified Body. A Notified Body is a public or private organisation that has been accredited to validate the compliance of the device to the European Directive. Medical devices that pertain to class I (on condition they do not require sterilization or do not measure a function) can be marketed purely by self-certification.

The European classification depends on rules that involve the medical device's duration of body contact, invasive character, use of an energy source, effect on the central circulation or nervous system, diagnostic impact, or incorporation of a medicinal product. Certified medical devices should have the CE mark on the packaging, insert leaflets, etc.. These packagings should also show harmonised pictograms and EN standardised logos to indicate essential features such as instructions for use, expiry date, manufacturer, sterile, do not reuse, etc.

In November 2018, the Federal Administrative Court of Switzerland decided that the "Sympto" app, used to analyze a woman's menstrual cycle, was a medical device because it calculates a fertility window for each woman using personal data. The manufacturer, Sympto-Therm Foundation, argued that this was a didactic, not a medical process. the court laid down that an app is a medical device if it is to be used for any of the medical purposes provided by law, and creates or modifies health information by calculations or comparison, providing information about an individual patient.

==== Japan ====
Medical devices (excluding in vitro diagnostics) in Japan are classified into four classes based on risk:

Device Class	Risk
Class I	Insignificant
Class II	Low
Class III	High Risk on Malfunction
Class IV	High Risk could cause life-threatening

Classes I and II distinguish between extremely low and low risk devices. Classes III and IV, moderate and high risk respectively, are highly and specially controlled medical devices. In vitro diagnostics have three risk classifications.

==== Rest of the world ====
For the remaining regions in the world, the risk classifications are generally similar to the United States, European Union, and Japan or are a variant combining two or more of the three countries' risk classifications.

===== ASEAN =====
The ASEAN Medical Device Directive (AMDD) has been adopted by several southeast Asian countries. The nations are at varying stages of adopting and implementing the Directive. The AMDD classification is risk-based and defines four levels: A - Low Risk, B - Low to Moderate Risk, C - Moderate – High Risk, and D - High Risk.

===== Australia =====
The classification of medical devices in Australia is outlined in section 41BD of the Therapeutic Goods Act 1989 and Regulation 3.2 of the Therapeutic Goods Regulations 2002, under control of the Therapeutic Goods Administration. Similarly to the EU classification, they rank in several categories, by order of increasing risk and associated required level of control. Various rules identify the device's category

Medical device categories in Australia
Classification	Level of risk
Class I	Low
Class I - measuring or Class I - supplied sterile or class IIa	Low - medium
Class IIb	Medium - high
Class III	High
Active implantable medical devices (AIMD)	High

===== Canada =====
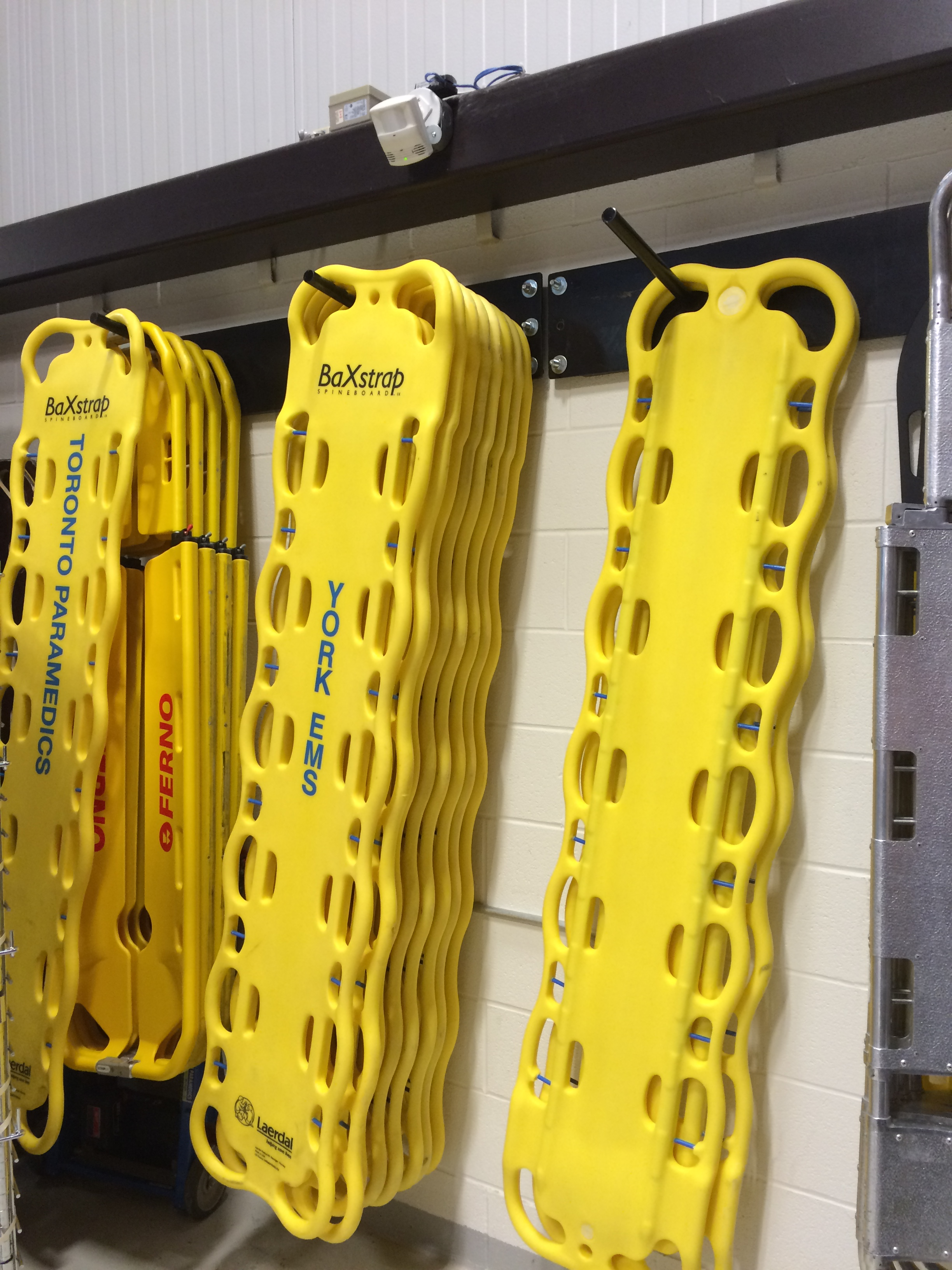
Spinal boards wait to be used at the York Region EMS logistics headquarters in Ontario

The Medical Devices Bureau of Health Canada recognizes four classes of medical devices based on the level of control necessary to assure the safety and effectiveness of the device. Class I devices present the lowest potential risk and do not require a licence. Class II devices require the manufacturer's declaration of device safety and effectiveness, whereas Class III and IV devices present a greater potential risk and are subject to in-depth scrutiny. A guidance document for device classification is published by Health Canada.

Canadian classes of medical devices correspond to the European Council Directive 93/42/EEC (MDD) devices:

- Class I (Canada) generally corresponds to Class I (ECD)
- Class II (Canada) generally corresponds to Class IIa (ECD)
- Class III (Canada) generally corresponds to Class IIb (ECD)
- Class IV (Canada) generally corresponds to Class III (ECD)

Examples include surgical instruments (Class I), contact lenses and ultrasound scanners (Class II), orthopedic implants and hemodialysis machines (Class III), and cardiac pacemakers (Class IV).

===== India =====
Medical devices in India are regulated by Central Drugs Standard Control Organisation (CDSCO). Medical devices under the Medical Devices Rules, 2017 are classified as per Global Harmonization Task Force (GHTF) based on associated risks.

The CDSCO classifications of medical devices govern alongside the regulatory approval and registration by the CDSCO is under the DCGI. Every single medical device in India pursues a regulatory framework that depends on the drug guidelines under the Drug and Cosmetics Act (1940) and the Drugs and Cosmetics runs under 1945. CDSCO classification for medical devices has a set of risk classifications for numerous products planned for notification and guidelines as medical devices.

Device Class	Risk	Examples
Class A	Low Risk	Tongue depressors, Wheelchairs, Spectacles, Alcohol Swabs
Class B	Low to Moderate Risk	Hearing aids, Thermometers
Class C	Moderate to High Risk	Ventilators, Infusion pumps
Class D	High Risk	Pacemakers, Defibrillators, Implanted prosthetics, Breast implants

===== Iran =====
Iran produces about 2,000 types of medical devices and medical supplies, such as appliances, dental supplies, disposable sterile medical items, laboratory machines, various biomaterials and dental implants. 400 Medical products are produced at the C and D risk class with all of them licensed by the Iranian Health Ministry in terms of safety and performance based on EU-standards.

Some Iranian medical devices are produced according to the European Union standards.

Some producers in Iran export medical devices and supplies which adhere to European Union standards to applicant countries, including 40 Asian and European countries.

Some Iranian producers export their products to foreign countries.

===== United Kingdom =====
Following Brexit, the UK medical device regulation was closely aligned with the EU medical device regulation, including classification. The regulation 7 of the Medical Devices Regulations 2002 (SI 2002 No 618, as amended) (UK medical devices regulations), classified general medical devices into four classes of increasing levels of risk: Class I, IIa, IIb or III in accordance with criteria in the UK medical devices regulations, Annex IX (as modified by Schedule 2A to the UK medical devices regulations).

=== Validation and verification ===
Validation and verification of medical devices ensure that they fulfil their intended purpose. Validation or verification is generally needed when a health facility acquires a new device to perform medical tests.

The main difference between the two is that validation is focused on ensuring that the device meets the needs and requirements of its intended users and the intended use environment, whereas verification is focused on ensuring that the device meets its specified design requirements.

=== Standardization and regulatory concerns ===
The ISO standards for medical devices are covered by ICS 11.100.20 and 11.040.01. The quality and risk management regarding the topic for regulatory purposes is convened by ISO 13485 and ISO 14971. ISO 13485:2016 is applicable to all providers and manufacturers of medical devices, components, contract services and distributors of medical devices. The standard is the basis for regulatory compliance in local markets, and most export markets. Additionally, ISO 9001:2008 sets precedence because it signifies that a company engages in the creation of new products. It requires that the development of manufactured products have an approval process and a set of rigorous quality standards and development records before the product is distributed. Further standards are IEC 60601-1 which is for electrical devices (mains-powered as well as battery powered), EN 45502-1 which is for Active implantable medical devices, and IEC 62304 for medical software. The US FDA also published a series of guidances for industry regarding this topic against 21 CFR 820 Subchapter H—Medical Devices. Subpart B includes quality system requirements, an important component of which are design controls (21 CFR 820.30). To meet the demands of these industry regulation standards, a growing number of medical device distributors are putting the complaint management process at the forefront of their quality management practices. This approach further mitigates risks and increases visibility of quality issues.

Starting in the late 1980s, the FDA increased its involvement in reviewing the development of medical device software. The precipitant for change was a radiation therapy device (Therac-25) that overdosed patients because of software coding errors. FDA is now focused on regulatory oversight on medical device software development process and system-level testing.

A 2011 study by Dr. Diana Zuckerman and Paul Brown of the National Center for Health Research, and Dr. Steven Nissen of the Cleveland Clinic, published in the Archives of Internal Medicine, showed that most medical devices recalled in the last five years for "serious health problems or death" had been previously approved by the FDA using the less stringent, and cheaper, 510(k) process. In a few cases, the devices had been deemed so low-risk that they did not they did not undergo any FDA regulatory review. Of the 113 devices recalled, 35 were for cardiovascular issues. This study was the topic of Congressional hearings re-evaluating FDA procedures and oversight.

A 2014 study by Dr. Diana Zuckerman, Paul Brown, and Dr. Aditi Das of the National Center for Health Research, published in JAMA Internal Medicine, examined the scientific evidence that is publicly available about medical implants that were cleared by the FDA 510(k) process from 2008 to 2012. They found that scientific evidence supporting "substantial equivalence" to other devices already on the market was required by law to be publicly available, but the information was available for only 16% of the randomly selected implants, and only 10% provided clinical data. Of the more than 1,100 predicate implants that the new implants were substantially equivalent to, only 3% had any publicly available scientific evidence, and only 1% had clinical evidence of safety or effectiveness. The researchers concluded that publicly available scientific evidence on implants was needed to protect the public health.

In 2014–2015, a new international agreement, the Medical Device Single Audit Program (MDSAP), was put in place with five participant countries: Australia, Brazil, Canada, Japan, and the United States. The aim of this program was to "develop a process that allows a single audit, or inspection to ensure the medical device regulatory requirements for all five countries are satisfied".

In 2017, a study by Dr. Jay Ronquillo and Dr. Diana Zuckerman published in the peer-reviewed policy journal Milbank Quarterly found that electronic health records and other device software were recalled due to life-threatening flaws. The article pointed out the lack of safeguards against hacking and other cybersecurity threats, stating "current regulations are necessary but not sufficient for ensuring patient safety by identifying and eliminating dangerous defects in software currently on the market". They added that legislative changes resulting from the law entitled the 21st Century Cures Act "will further deregulate health IT, reducing safeguards that facilitate the reporting and timely recall of flawed medical software that could harm patients".

A study by Dr. Stephanie Fox-Rawlings and colleagues at the National Center for Health Research, published in 2018 in the policy journal Milbank Quarterly, investigated whether studies reviewed by the FDA for high-risk medical devices are proven safe and effective for women, minorities, or patients over 65 years of age. The law encourages patient diversity in clinical trials submitted to the FDA for review, but does not require it. The study determined that most high-risk medical devices are not tested and analyzed to ensure that they are safe and effective for all major demographic groups, particularly racial and ethnic minorities and people over 65. Therefore, they do not provide information about safety or effectiveness that would help patients and physicians make well informed decisions.

In 2018, an investigation involving journalists across 36 countries coordinated by the International Consortium of Investigative Journalists (ICIJ) prompted calls for reform in the United States, particularly around the 510(k) substantial equivalence process; the investigation prompted similar calls in the UK and Europe Union.

==== Packaging standards ====
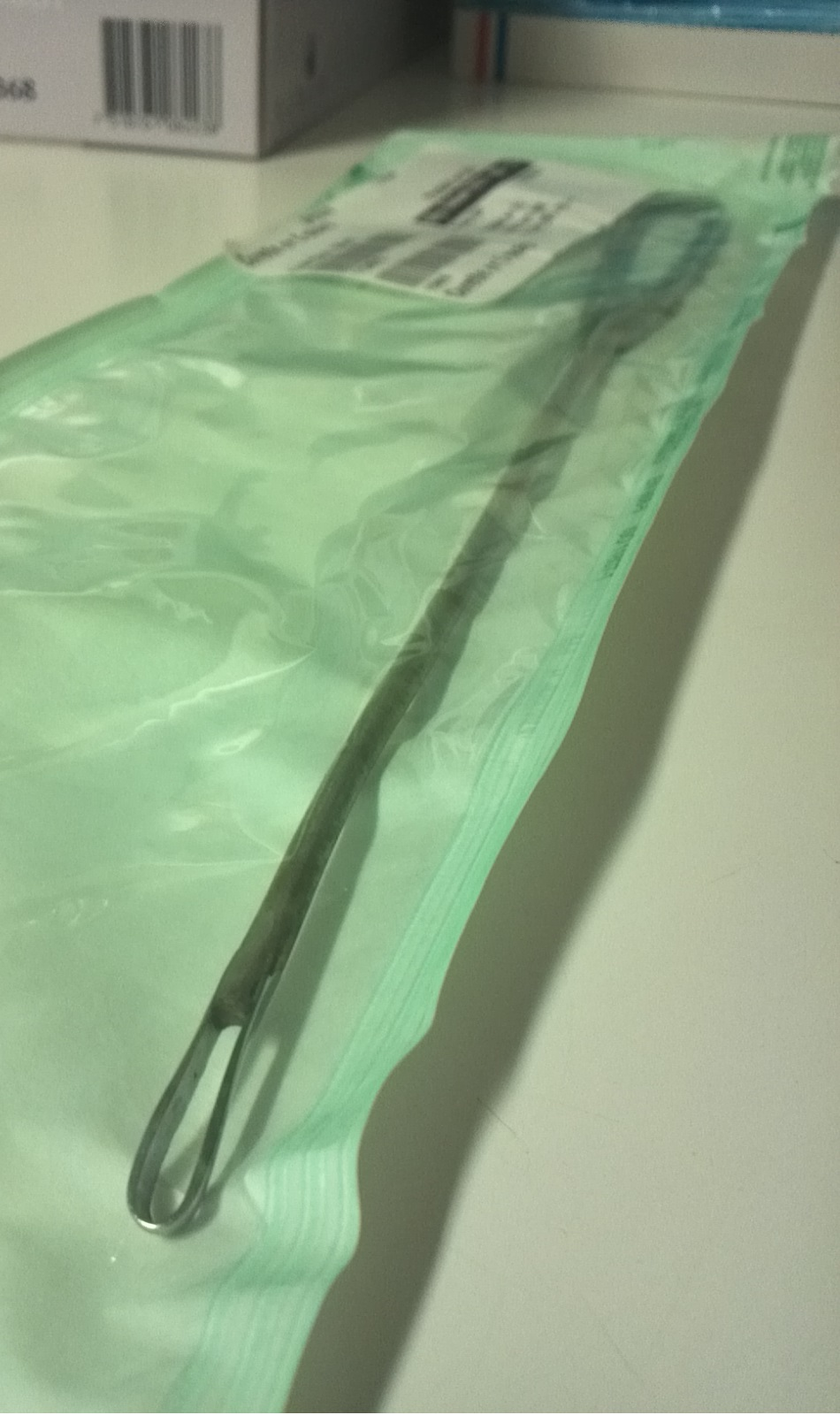
Curette in sterile pouch. Porous tyvek material allows gas sterilization

Medical device packaging is highly regulated. Often medical devices and products are sterilized in the package. Sterility must be maintained throughout distribution to allow immediate use by physicians. A series of special packaging tests measure the ability of the package to maintain sterility. Relevant standards include:

- ASTM F2097 – Standard Guide for Design and Evaluation of Primary Flexible Packaging for Medical Products
- ASTM F2475-11 – Standard Guide for Biocompatibility Evaluation of Medical Device Packaging Materials
- EN 868 Packaging materials and systems for medical devices to be sterilized, General requirements and test methods
- ISO 11607 Packaging for terminally sterilized medical devices

Package testing is part of a quality management system including verification and validation. It is important to document and ensure that packages meet regulations and end-use requirements. Manufacturing processes must be controlled and validated to ensure consistent performance. EN ISO 15223-1 defines symbols that can be used to convey important information on packaging and labeling.

==== Biocompatibility standards ====
- ISO 10993 - Biological Evaluation of Medical Devices

==== Cleanliness standards ====
Medical device cleanliness has come under greater scrutiny since 2000, when Sulzer Orthopedics recalled several thousand metal hip implants that contained a manufacturing residue. Based on this event, ASTM established a new task group (F04.15.17) for established test methods, guidance documents, and other standards to address cleanliness of medical devices. This task group has issued two standards for permanent implants to date: 1. ASTM F2459: Standard test method for extracting residue from metallic medical components and quantifying via gravimetric analysis 2. ASTM F2847: Standard Practice for Reporting and Assessment of Residues on Single Use Implants 3. ASTM F3172: Standard Guide for Validating Cleaning Processes Used During the Manufacture of Medical Devices

In addition, the cleanliness of re-usable devices has led to a series of standards, including:

- ASTM E2314: Standard Test Method for Determination of Effectiveness of Cleaning Processes for Reusable Medical Instruments Using a Microbiologic Method (Simulated Use Test)"
- ASTM D7225: Standard Guide for Blood Cleaning Efficiency of Detergents and Washer-Disinfectors
- ASTM F3208: Standard Guide for Selecting Test Soils for Validation of Cleaning Methods for Reusable Medical Devices

The ASTM F04.15.17 task group is working on several new standards that involve designing implants for cleaning, selection and testing of brushes for cleaning reusable devices, and cleaning assessment of medical devices made by additive manufacturing. Additionally, the FDA is establishing new guidelines for reprocessing reusable medical devices, such as orthoscopic shavers, endoscopes, and suction tubes. New research was published in ACS Applied Interfaces and Material to keep Medical Tools pathogen free.

== Design, prototyping, and product development ==
Medical device manufacturing requires a level of process control according to the classification of the device. Higher risk; more controls. When in the initial R&D phase, manufacturers are now beginning to design for manufacturability. This means products can be more precision-engineered to for production to result in shorter lead times, tighter tolerances and more advanced specifications and prototypes. The arrival of CAD and other modelling platforms accelerated this process, acting both as a tool for strategic design generation and marketing.

Failure to meet cost targets will lead to substantial losses for an organisation. In addition, with global competition, the R&D of new devices is not just a necessity, it is an imperative for medical device manufacturers. The realisation of a new design can be very costly, especially with the shorter product life cycle. As technology advances, there is typically a level of quality, safety and reliability that increases exponentially with time.

For example, initial models of the artificial cardiac pacemaker were external support devices that transmits pulses of electricity to the heart muscles via electrode leads on the chest. The electrodes contact the heart directly through the chest, allowing stimulation pulses to pass through the body. Recipients of this typically developed an infection at the entrance of the electrodes, which led to the subsequent trial of the first internal pacemaker, with electrodes attached to the myocardium by thoracotomy. Future developments led to the isotope-power source that would last for the lifespan of the patient.

== Software ==
=== Mobile medical applications ===
With the rise of smartphone usage in the medical space, in 2013, the FDA issued to regulate mobile medical applications and protect users from their unintended use, soon followed by European and other regulatory agencies. This guidance distinguishes the apps subjected to regulation based on the marketing claims of the apps. Incorporation of the guidelines during the development phase of such apps can be considered as developing a medical device; the regulations have to adapt and propositions for expedite approval may be required due to the nature of 'versions' of mobile application development.

On September 25, 2013, the FDA released a draft guidance document for regulation of mobile medical applications, to clarify what kind of mobile apps related to health would not be regulated, and which would be.

=== Cybersecurity ===
Medical devices such as pacemakers, insulin pumps, operating room monitors, defibrillators, and surgical instruments, including deep-brain stimulators, can incorporate the ability to transmit vital health information from a patient's body to medical professionals. Some of these devices can be remotely controlled. This has engendered concern about privacy and security issues, human error, and technical glitches with this technology. While only a few studies have looked at the susceptibility of medical devices to hacking, there is a risk. In 2008, computer scientists proved that pacemakers and defibrillators can be hacked wirelessly via radio hardware, an antenna, and a personal computer. These researchers showed they could shut down a combination heart defibrillator and pacemaker and reprogram it to deliver potentially lethal shocks or run out its battery. Jay Radcliff, a security researcher interested in the security of medical devices, raised fears about the safety of these devices. He shared his concerns at the Black Hat security conference. Radcliff fears that the devices are vulnerable and has found that a lethal attack is possible against those with insulin pumps and glucose monitors. Some medical device makers downplay the threat from such attacks and argue that the demonstrated attacks have been performed by skilled security researchers and are unlikely to occur in the real world. At the same time, other makers have asked software security experts to investigate the safety of their devices. In June 2011, security experts showed that by using readily available hardware and a user manual, a scientist could tap into the information on the system of a wireless insulin pump in combination with a glucose monitor. With the PIN of the device, the scientist could wirelessly control the dosage of the insulin. Anand Raghunathan, a researcher in this study, explains that medical devices are getting smaller and lighter so that they can be easily worn. The downside is that additional security features would put an extra strain on the battery and size and drive up prices. Dr. William Maisel offered some thoughts on the motivation to engage in this activity. Motivation to do this hacking might include acquisition of private information for financial gain or competitive advantage; damage to a device manufacturer's reputation; sabotage; intent to inflict financial or personal injury or just satisfaction for the attacker. Researchers suggest a few safeguards. One would be to use rolling codes. Another solution is to use a technology called "body-coupled communication" that uses the human skin as a wave guide for wireless communication. On 28 December 2016, the US Food and Drug Administration released its recommendations that are not legally enforceable for how medical device manufacturers should maintain the security of Internet-connected devices.

Similar to hazards, cybersecurity threats and vulnerabilities cannot be eliminated but must be managed and reduced to a reasonable level. When designing medical devices, the tier of cybersecurity risk should be determined early in the process in order to establish a cybersecurity vulnerability and management approach (including a set of cybersecurity design controls). The medical device design approach employed should be consistent with the NIST Cybersecurity Framework for managing cybersecurity-related risks.

In August 2013, the FDA released over 20 regulations aiming to improve the security of data in medical devices, in response to the growing risks of limited cybersecurity.

=== Artificial intelligence ===
The number of approved medical devices using artificial intelligence or machine learning (AI/ML) is increasing. As of 2020, there were several hundred AI/ML medical devices approved by the US FDA or CE-marked devices in Europe. Most AI/ML devices focus upon radiology. As of 2020, there was no specific regulatory pathway for AI/ML-based medical devices in the US or Europe. However, in January 2021, the FDA published a proposed regulatory framework for AI/ML-based software, and the EU medical device regulation which replaces the EU Medical Device Directive in May 2021, defines regulatory requirements for medical devices, including AI/ML software. In January 2025, the FDA published a draft guidance document for AI-enabled medical devices, covering both lifecycle considerations and marketing submissions.

== Medical equipment ==
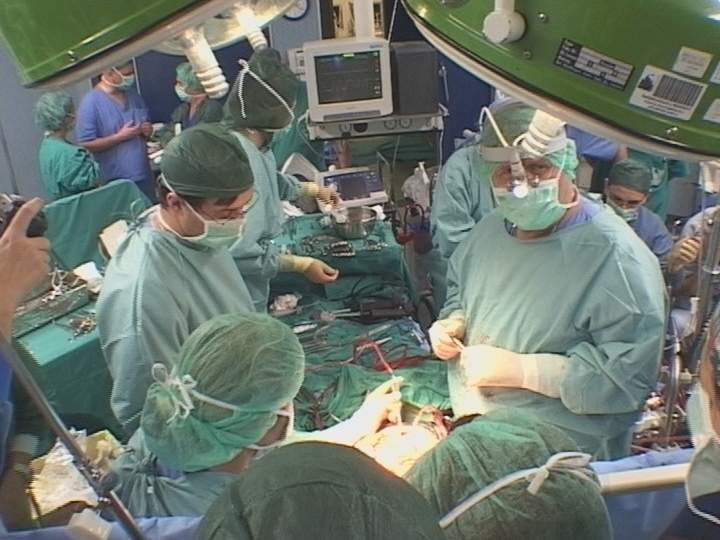
Medical equipment

Medical equipment (also known as armamentarium) is designed to aid in the diagnosis, monitoring or treatment of medical conditions.

=== Types ===
There are several basic types:

- Diagnostic equipment includes medical imaging machines, used to aid in diagnosis. Examples are ultrasound and MRI machines, PET and CT scanners, and x-ray machines.
- Treatment equipment includes infusion pumps, medical lasers and LASIK surgical machines.
- Life support equipment is used to maintain a patient's bodily function. This includes medical ventilators, incubators, anaesthetic machines, heart-lung machines, ECMO, and dialysis machines.
- Medical monitors allow medical staff to measure a patient's medical state. Monitors may measure patient vital signs and other parameters including ECG, EMG, and blood pressure.
- Medical laboratory equipment automates or helps analyze blood, urine, genes, and dissolved gases in the blood.
- Diagnostic medical equipment may also be used in the home for certain purposes, e.g. for the control of diabetes mellitus, such as in the case of continuous glucose monitoring.
- Therapeutic: physical therapy machines like continuous passive range of motion (CPM) machines
- Air purifying equipment may be used in the periphery of the operating room or at point sources including near the surgical site for the removal of surgical plume.

The identification of medical devices has been recently improved by the introduction of Unique Device Identification (UDI) and standardised naming using the Global Medical Device Nomenclature (GMDN) which have been endorsed by the International Medical Device Regulatory Forum (IMDRF).

A biomedical equipment technician (BMET) is a vital component of the healthcare delivery system. Employed primarily by hospitals, BMETs are the people responsible for maintaining a facility's medical equipment. BMET mainly act as an interface between doctor and equipment.

=== Medical equipment donation ===
There are challenges surrounding the availability of medical equipment from a global health perspective, with low-resource countries unable to obtain or afford essential and life-saving equipment. In these settings, well-intentioned equipment donation from high- to low-resource settings is a frequently used strategy to address this through individuals, organisations, manufacturers and charities. However, issues with maintenance, availability of biomedical equipment technicians (BMET), supply chains, user education and the appropriateness of donations means these frequently fail to deliver the intended benefits. The WHO estimates that 95% of medical equipment in low- and middle-income countries (LMICs) is imported and 80% of it is funded by international donors or foreign governments. While up to 70% of medical equipment in sub-Saharan Africa is donated, only 10%–30% of donated equipment becomes operational. A review of current practice and guidelines for the donation of medical equipment for surgical and anaesthesia care in LMICs has demonstrated a high level of complexity within the donation process and numerous shortcomings. Greater collaboration and planning between donors and recipients is required together with evaluation of donation programs and concerted advocacy to educate donors and recipients on existing equipment donation guidelines and policies.

The circulation of medical equipment is not limited to donations. The rise of reuse and recycle-based solutions, where gently used medical equipment is donated and redistributed to communities in need, is another form of equipment distribution. An interest in reusing and recycling emerged in the 1980s when the potential health hazards of medical waste on the East Coast beaches became highlighted by the media. Connecting the large demand for medical equipment and single-use medical devices, with a need for waste reduction, as well as the problem of unequal access for low-income communities led to the Congress enacting the Medical Waste Tracking Act of 1988. Medical equipment can be donated either by governments or non-governmental organizations, domestic or international. Donated equipment ranges from bedside assistance to radiological equipment.

Medical equipment donation has come under scrutiny with regard to donated-device failure and loss of warranty in the case of previous-ownership. Most medical devices and production company warranties do not extend to reused or donated devices, or to devices donated by initial owners/patients. Such reuse raises matters of patient autonomy, medical ethics, and legality. Such concerns conflict with the importance of equal access to healthcare resources, and the goal of serving the greatest good for the greatest number.

== Academic resources ==
- Medical & Biological Engineering & Computing journal
- Expert Review of Medical Devices journal

=== University-based research packaging institutes ===
- University of Minnesota - Medical Devices Center (MDC)
- University of Strathclyde - Strathclyde Institute of Medical Devices (SIMD)
- Flinders University - Medical Device Research Institute (MDRI)
- Michigan State University - School of Packaging (SoP)
- IIT Bombay - Biomedical Engineering and Technology (incubation) Centre (BETiC)

== See also ==
- Assistive technology
- Clinical engineer
- Design history file
- Durable medical equipment
- Electromagnetic compatibility
- Electronic health record
- Federal Institute for Drugs and Medical Devices
- GHTF
- Health Level 7
- Home medical equipment
- Instruments used in general medicine
- Instruments used in obstetrics and gynecology
- List of common EMC test standards
- Medical grade silicone
- Medical logistics
- Medical technology
- Pharmacopoeia
- Safety engineer
- Telemedicine
