= Bessie =

Bessie is a feminine given name, often a diminutive form (hypocorism) of Elizabeth, Beatrice and other names since the 16th century. It is sometimes a name in its own right.

Notable people with the name include:

== People ==
- Bessie Abott (1878–1919), American operatic soprano
- Bessie Acland (1870–1959), New Zealand painter
- Bessie Anthony (1880–1912), American golfer
- Bessie Anstice Baker (1849–1914), Australian writer
- Bessie Bamber, British artist
- Bessie Bangay (1889–1987), English church worker
- Bessie Banks (actress) (1887–1969), American actress and screenwriter
- Bessie Banks (born 1938), American soul singer
- Bessie Bardot (born 1974), Australian businesswoman, writer, model and television host
- Bessie Barriscale (1884–1965), American actress
- Bessie Beatty (1886–1947), American journalist
- Bessie Morse Bellingrath (1878–1943), American philanthropist
- Bessie Bellwood (1856–1896), British music hall entertainer
- Bessie Bennett (1870–1939), American jewelry designer and museum curator
- Bessie Blomfield (1880–1984), New Zealand artist
- Bessie Blount, several people
- Bessie Bonehill (1855–1902), English vaudeville performer
- Bessie Braddock (1899–1970), British politician
- Bessie Breuer (1893–1975), American journalist
- Bessie Marsh Brewer (1884–1952), Canadian printmaker, painter, sculptor and teacher
- Bessie Brown (1890–1955), American singer
- Bessie A. Buchanan (1902–1980), American politician
- Bessie Burke (1891–1968), American teacher and principal
- Bessie Buskirk (1892–1952), American actress
- Bessie Callender (1889–1951), American sculptor
- Bessie Carter (born 1993), English actress
- Bessie Charles (c. 1869–1932), British architect
- Bessie Christie (1904–1983), New Zealand painter
- Bessie Clayton (1878–1948), American dancer
- Bessie Olive Cole (1883–1971), American pharmacist
- Bessie Coleman (1892–1926), American civil aviator
- Bessie Bell Collier (1885–1969), American violinist
- Bessie Boies Cotton (1880–1959), American YWCA staff member
- Bessie Lee Cowie (1860–1950), Australian-New Zealand temperance campaigner, social reformer, lecturer and writer
- Bessie Craigmyle (1863–1933), Scottish poet
- Bessie Cursons (born 1995), British actress
- Bessie Darling (1885–1933), American murder victim
- Bessie Davidson (1879–1965), Australian artist
- Bessie De Voie (1880–1974), American actress and dancer
- Annie Elizabeth Delany (1891–1995), American civil rights pioneer
- Bessie Hall Dempsey, American aeronautical engineer
- Bessie Dewar (born 1980), American judge
- Bessie Downes (1860–1920), botanical artist
- Bessie Drysdale (1871–1950), British teacher, suffragette and birth control campaigner
- Bessie Dwyer (1866–1944), American librarian
- Bessie Eyton (1890–1965), American actress
- Bessie Alexander Ficklen (1861–1945), American poet and artist
- Bessie Flower (c. 1851–1895), Aboriginal teacher
- Bessie Bartlett Frankel (1884–1959), American concert singer, composer and clubwoman
- Bessie Gibson (1868–1961), Australian artist
- Bessie Te Wenerau Grace (1889–1944), New Zealand teacher and education leader
- Bessie Griffin (1822–1989), American gospel singer
- Bessie Guthrie (1905–1977), Australian designer, publisher, feminist and campaigner
- Bessie Pease Gutmann (1876–1960), American painter
- Bessie Mecklem Hackenberger (1876–1942), American saxophonist
- Bessie Hall (1849–1930), Canadian seafarer
- Bessie Harvey (1929–1994), American sculptor
- Bessie Hatton (1867–1964), English actress and feminist
- Bessie Ella Hazen, Canadian-American painter
- Bessie Head (1937–1986), South African writer
- Bessie Bradwell Helmer (1858–1927), American lawyer, editor and publisher
- Bessie Abramowitz Hillman (1889–1970), American labor organizer
- Bessie Hocken (1848–1933), New Zealand artist and translator
- Bessie Holland, Australian actress
- Bessilyn Johnson (1871–1943), wife of Chicago millionaire Albert Johnson
- Elizabeth Jones, several people
- Bessie B. Kanouse (1889–1969), American mycologist
- Bessie Mae Kelley, American animator
- Bessie Learn (1888–1987), American actress
- Bessie Lee (1924–2016), Chinese-Canadian community organizer
- Bessie Locke (1865–1952), American educator
- Bessie Loo (1902–1998), American actress and talent agent
- Bessie Love (1898–1986), American-British actress
- Bessie Margolin (1909–1996), American lawyer
- Bessie Niemeyer Marshall, American artist
- Bessie Lee Mauldin (1920–1983), American musician
- Bessie Maxwell (1871–1946), American journalist
- Bessie S. McColgin (1875–1972), American politician
- Bessie McCoy (1888–1931), Irish-American singer
- Bessie Brown Mention (1873–1946), American suffragist and activist
- Betty Mitchell (theatre director) (1896–1976), Canadian theatre director and educator
- Bessie Moody-Lawrence (1941–2012), American politician
- Diamond Bessie (1854–1877), American murder victim
- Bessie Boehm Moore (1902–1995), American educator
- Bessie Morse (1869–1948), American educator
- Bessie Moses, American gynecologist and obstetrician
- Bessie I. Murray, American politician
- Bessie Rayner Parkes (1829–1925), English feminist, women's rights activist, poet, essayist and journalist
- Bessie Louise Pierce (1886–1974), American historian
- Bessie Pocock (1863–1946), Australian nursing sister and army matron
- Bessie Gardner du Pont (1864–1949), American historian
- Bessie Leach Priddy (1871–1935), educator, social reformer and leader of the Delta Delta Delta women's fraternity
- Bessie Pullen-Burry (1858–1937), British novelist, explorer and suffragist
- Bessie Raiche (1875–1932), American dentist, physician, and America's first female aviator
- Bessie Bown Ricker (1872–1953), American performer
- Bessie Rischbieth (1874–1967), Australian feminist and social activist
- Bessie Schonberg (1906–1997), German-born dancer, choreographer and teacher
- Bessie Skea (1923–1996), Scottish writer and poet
- Bessie Smith (1894–1937), American blues singer
- Bessie Mae Smith, American blues singer
- Bessie Anderson Stanley (1879–1952), American writer
- Bessie Staples, English badminton player
- Bessie Starkman (1890–1930), Jewish-Canadian gangster
- Bessie Stillman (1871–1947), educator and contributor
- Bessie Stockard, American tennis player
- Bessie Stringfield (1911–1993), American motorcyclist
- Bessie Sudlow (1849–1928), British singer and entertainer
- Bessie Taylor (1896–1974), American politician
- Bessie Thomashefsky (1873–1962), American actress
- Bessie Toner (1885–1951), American actress
- Bessie Tucker (c. 1906–1933), American blues singer
- Bessie Turner, British singer-songwriter
- Bessie Van Vorst (1873–1928), American author and journalist
- Bessie Potter Vonnoh (1872–1955), American sculptor
- Bessie Watson (1900–1992), Scottish child suffragette
- Bessie Wentworth (1873–1901), English entertainer
- Bessie Williamson (1910–1982), Scottish distillery owner
- Bessie Wynn (1876–1968), American actress and singer
- Bessie Woodson Yancey (1882–1958), African-American poet
- Bessie (South African queen), South African traditional aristocrat

== Fictional characters ==
- Bessie Higgenbottom, a character in the TV animated series The Mighty B!
- Elizabeth Bessie Potter, a character on the TV series Dawson's Creek
- Bessie, a road paving machine in the 2006 animated film Cars
- Bessie Limpet, a character in the 1964 film The Incredible Mr. Limpet
- Bessie Busybody, a character in the TV series LazyTown
- Bessie, a car in the TV series Doctor Who
- Bessie Blithesome, a character from the 1902 L. Frank Baum book The Life and Adventures of Santa Claus

== See also ==
- Bess (name)
