= Women in engineering in the United States =

Historically, women in the United States have been represented at lower rates than men in both science and engineering college programs and careers. Over time, this pattern has led to a significantly higher concentration of male professional engineers compared to women. Additionally, this disparity has led to careers in Education, History, English, Humanities and the like to be seen as "feminine" careers and areas of study. Feminist theorists suggest that these social and historical factors have perpetuated women's low participation rates in engineering over time. Explanations for this gap includes these stereotypes such as women's lack of interest/not wanting to do STEM, and environmental factors in women's childhoods that discourage them from entering science and engineering fields.

Negative perceptions of female engineers may play a role in explaining their low numbers within the field. According to recent statistics, college-educated women are less than half as likely as men to be employed in science and engineering jobs.

Two forms of activism tasked with raising awareness include both organizations on college campuses and those geared towards society at large.

== History ==
In the early 1960s, a President's Commission on the Status of Women emphasized the need for women to fill a shortage of jobs in teaching, science, and engineering. In 1960, however, less than 1% of recorded engineers were women. Furthermore, female engineers that were employed were less likely to have obtained advanced degrees in their field than men. Research has shown that these trends were reflective of both men's and women's dominant opinions regarding women's role in the workforce throughout this period. At the time, both groups largely emphasized women's roles as traditional homemakers and mothers rather than as serious scientists or engineers.

Despite changing political views towards women and minorities during the civil rights movement, college women's enrollment rates into engineering were still relatively low when compared to men's. For example, in a study of over 440 college campuses nationwide throughout 1971–72, approximately 17% of polled Science, Technology, Engineering, and Math (STEM) majors were women. This coincides with the fact that, throughout this period, there was little recorded formal discrimination in the American educational system. Women who actually applied to engineering programs were enrolled at similar rates to men. Early increases in these numbers did occur, though, throughout 1968–78. During this period, there was an estimated 100% increase in the number of female science and engineering majors throughout the United States. However, it was also estimated that they still accounted for less than 4.9% of such majors throughout this period.

Despite women's increasing numbers in science and engineering fields, affirmative action and similar efforts were implemented throughout the U.S. to increase STEM enrollment rates. It was proposed, among other factors, that early socialization by elementary schools and social stereotyping was to blame for this issue. In the mid 1980s, a shortage of qualified engineers was predicted by the year 2000, further instigating efforts to both recruit and retain women in these fields. Existing groups that promote women in engineering: ASCE Task force Committee on Women in Civil Engineering, Extraordinary Women Engineers Project Coalition.

== Statistics and relevant data ==
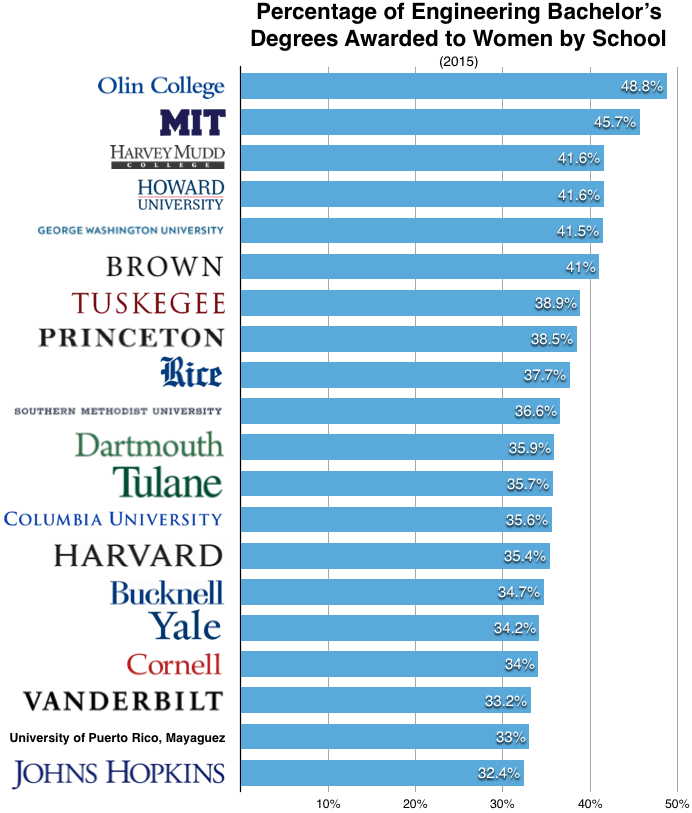
Percentage of Engineering Bachelor's Degrees Awarded to Women by School

According to the National Science Foundation, overall, women have higher college graduation rates compared to men. However, men disproportionately outnumber women in the number of Science and Engineering (STEM) degrees received. Between 1989 and 2008, the approximate percentages of women receiving their Bachelor's degree in any engineering field were 17% and 19.6%, respectively. The percentage increase in the computer science industry displayed was larger, increasing from approximately 10% in 1989 to 21% in 2008.

Concerning minority (African American, Hispanic, Native American) women, the percentages of engineering bachelor's recipients increased from approximately 7% in 1989 to 12% in 2008. The percentages of minority women with engineering doctoral degrees were much lower, however, barely increasing from 1% throughout this period. Asian women actually accounted for a lower rate of engineering bachelor's degree during this time period, from approximately 2.5% to 5%. PhD recipient rates from 1989 to 2008 were nearly identical to minority women's.

According to the National Society of Professional Engineers in 2004, there were approximately 192,900 female engineers throughout the country, compared with over 1,515,000 men. Of these women, approximately 1/3 of them were software engineers (62,900). Women were also employed in higher rates than men in environmental engineering (9% to 4%) and chemical engineering (7% to 4%). However, they were less likely than men to be employed in mechanical engineering (8% to 17%) and electrical engineering (12% to 18%).

In 1999, women made up approximately one quarter of all engineers under the age of 25, whereas they constituted one-twentieth of those over age 49. This age discrepancy has been attributed to women's notable, but recent, movement into engineering within the past few decades. According to the Society of Women Engineers, women and other minorities constituted approximately 16%-17% of engineering graduate students from 1990 to 2003. Furthermore, in 2003 approximately 20% (approximately 12,000)of new engineers were women, compared with about 80% of men (approximately 49,000).

According to the ASEE, the top 10 colleges producing women engineers:

1. Georgia Institute of Technology
2. Massachusetts Institute of Technology
3. University of Michigan
4. Purdue University
5. Univ. of Illinois, Urbana-Champaign
6. Ohio State University
7. Pennsylvania State University
8. University of Florida
9. Texas A&M University
10. Cornell University

== Explanations for low participation rates ==
Numerous explanations have come forth to account for the lack of women engineering majors in college. Historically, women have both majored and remained in college engineering programs at lower rates than men. One of the reasons used to explain this trend has been a supposed overemphasis on the traditional "male breadwinner" household model when it comes to organizing families today. Although the percentage of families organized according to this model has declined considerably in recent decades, many individuals, including women, still see adult men as the primary wage earners in households where men were present. Even if this is the case women represent close to 60% of university graduates, including biology mayors. IES: What is the percentage of degrees conferred by race and sex?

Recently, greater emphasis has been given to women's socialization throughout their childhood and adolescence years. Socialized early in their childhoods, girls are said to be raised in societies where science, engineering, and mathematical fields are largely promoted as being "male professions". The media has also been criticized for giving little representation of females within the industry. Instead, some scholars feel that the media is guilty of perpetuating gender stereotypes by representing women in traditional "female occupations" such as nurses, school teachers, and housewives. Men help feed into this because they feel as if women aren't cut out for traditional engineering roles but rather one's where they don't have as much responsibility associated directly with the job itself. This idea is supported by a study where STEM field applicants were given a first and second choice on their majors. The results showed that women were more likely to pick male dominated fields in their second choice rather than in their first. This study found that orientations toward certain fields of study were less segregated than actual behaviors, suggesting that cultural perception toward certain fields curbs the aspirations of women that are the most competent. One of the many reasons behind this is that it stems from the treatment that women face from their male peers during collaboration. Women have reported that the males in their groups assign the women routine managerial and secretarial work to complete, leaving the women to be excluded from the hands on engineering work. The overall idea that women are underrepresented in the field has paved a way for these barrier to be raised against women becoming successful members within the field themselves.

Christina Hoff Sommers has suggested that subjects such as engineering may be less popular among women because they do not accommodate some of their typical interests with the interaction between living beings being one example. This is not necessarily to suggest, with Lawrence Summers, that women are incapable or less fundamentally capable than men at engineering, but rather that they tend to be less interested in the subject in general. The principle strength of this argument is that it explains the phenomenon without drawing tenuous links with difficult-to-measure influences such as 'culture' and 'role-models', but it is also to some degree reinforced by academic consensus, which was identified in the 'Social and Political views of American Professors' paper as 75% in favor of the claim that differing interests between men and women caused the disparity, rather than discrimination.

The presence of role models, and especially female role models, has also been emphasized as a means of increasing women's numbers in engineering. Women with one or two engineering parents are said to be moderately more likely to major in such a field themselves. Women also choose to look up to women who are already in the field as role models and mentors for their future career aspirations because they begin to think that they too can accomplish what they had once done themselves. Additionally, encouragement from teachers, counselors, and administrators. are all said to have a positive impact on a women's chances at moving into engineering. Better high school preparation in mathematics, biology, and chemistry were also said to better a women's success in an engineering career. However, according to some scholars, the above factors do not occur in a great enough number to compensate for women's current disadvantages. Thus, generally speaking, it is likely that women engineers will remain largely discriminated against and have inadequate resources at improving their outlook unless substantial social changes are made to society.

== Socialization and societal outcomes ==
=== Educational outcomes ===
It has been suggested that, due to the social and environmental factors described above, high school and college women tend to have lower confidence levels in their mathematical ability compared to men. Shelley Correll's observations using the National Educational Longitudinal Survey (NELS) revealed that, on average, women who positively assessed their math ability before testing had a higher average score than women who did not rate themselves well. Moreover, longitudinal studies on both sets of women also revealed that the ones who did rate themselves highly were more likely to subsequently enroll in college-level calculus.

Goldman later discovered that positive math assessments played an important role in women's choices to enroll in engineering. However, other studies have before and since emphasized women's early life experiences in shaping their career aspirations. Feeling they are not skilled enough to successfully complete an engineering program or other advanced mathematical and/or science courses, some women perform poorly and thus complete a self-fulfilling prophecy. Instead, in the U.S labor force, there is approximately less than 1 female engineer for every 10 males. According to the U.S. Bureau of Labor Statistics for 2011, 13.6% of those employed in Architecture and engineering occupations were women.

Further studies have also shown that a lack of pre-degree training in high school did not sufficiently explain women engineer's dropout rates later in college. Analyses of males' and females' grades revealed that, on average, women who had dropped out of engineering programs were either approximately as qualified or even more qualified than their male peers who continued their studies. Additionally, surveyed female dropouts revealed that very few (approximately 9.8% to 11.5%) actually dropped out because they viewed the work as too difficult. Among their primary reasons for dropping were: loss of interest in the field, the inability to see themselves as professional engineers, inappropriate behavior from male peers, and the highly pressured environment professional engineers worked under. A phenomenon called "stereotype threat" may also help explain women's educational outcomes. Because of existing stereotypes regarding women's ability to excel in mathematics-intensive coursework, they are sometimes said to perform worse than they originally would have had the stereotypes not existed.

=== Workplace outcomes ===
According to Hersch, a significant number of corporations have increased the number of women engineers hired in the past couple of decades in response to political and social pressures. In addition to their engineering expertise, women engineers are said to bring unique caring and non-technical problem solving skills along with an enlarged customer support base. Typically preceding these management changes were other policy shifts such as: 1) a company move from heavy to light manufacturing; 2) a greater emphasis on service and professional jobs; 3) improved working conditions, and 4) a general improvement of women's status on the job.

Overall, however, engineering is said to remain a highly gender-stratified occupation. Among the engineers currently employed, men substantially outnumber women. On average, men are also said to hold higher supervisory and management positions than females, whose promotion prospects are usually more limited. This reason, family and child obligations, and layoffs combined to account for a drop-out rate of approximately 20% among all female engineers from 1982 to 1990—a statistic over twice of that of men.

It has been suggested by Crompton and Sanderson that discrimination in high-level technical jobs is actually decreasing on the whole. Moreover, they suggest that equal-opportunities legislation ensures that men and women with appropriate human capital are treated equally in recruitment chances. Direct and indirect forms of exclusion were no longer said to be significant in sustaining gender segregation in engineering positions. Statistically, gender pay gaps in engineering are actually lower than the national average. In STEM jobs, female wages are approximately 84% of men's, compared to 71% in non-STEM jobs. Moreover, it has also been stated that traditionally stereotypical images of engineering as "dirty", "rugged", or "manly" jobs are gradually being eroded—opening employment opportunities for prospective women nationwide.

However, recent evidence suggests that gender discrimination is still a significant issue affecting women's confidence and performance in STEM careers. According to Logel, interacting with sexist men may trigger a stressed-induced phenomenon called "social identity threat" in women. Women engineers who faced regular exposure to sexist men on the job were said perform worse on aptitude tests than women who weren't exposed to such individuals. While women who worked in low-stress environments reported higher levels of confidence and self-fulfillment, discriminated women were reportedly more likely to suppress their feelings and/or let their problems go unannounced. Such behavior is said to be detrimental to both the women engineers themselves and the workplace, where sexist behavior is likely to persist.

== Initiatives to promote engineering to women ==
As science and engineering have become more pervasive in society, women's participation rates in these fields have not seen a proportionate increase. According to Cuny and Aspray, this may potentially result in a lack of women's talent in the fields, which may further reduce employment opportunities for both employer and employee In order to make engineering more appealing to young women, a broader acceptance criteria into such programs has been proposed. Specifically, admissions boards are encouraged to take other admissions factors into account such as: extracurricular accomplishments, applicants' desire to be admitted into the program, and communication skills. Additionally, it has been strongly suggested that admissions boards prioritize ethnic diversity.

Research has revealed that high school- and college-age women commonly see the STEM environment as a "chilly, male-dominated" environment that is highly impersonal and unsympathetic to women's unique needs. "Social coping" has thus been a mechanism which has been cited to help women deal with the challenges and stress associated with engineering's rigorous coursework and careers. Multiple regression analysis has revealed that high levels of social coping were a stronger predictor of commitment to staying in engineering studies for women than men. Put more simply, women who used social coping were less likely than men (who were actually found to be more likely) to drop out of college engineering programs. Consequently, school teachers, staff, parents, and other figures have been encouraged to provide a more accommodating environment for social coping.

An increase in influential female role models has also been cited as a way to increase women's engineering enrollment rates. surveys collected among 141 female engineering students across the country have shown that many women who placed high confidence levels in their math and science ability also had parents who modeled less traditional gender roles. Thus, to increase women's enrollment and retention rates in engineering, scholars have suggested that a de-emphasis away from the highly popularized "nuclear family" model is crucial. The Society of Women Engineers (SWE) was established on May 27, 1950 by Elsie Eaves as a non-profit educational and service organization that attempted both to raise awareness of female engineers and increase their enrollment rates. SWE held their first meeting with 50 engineers at Cooper Union in NJ. With membership now exceeding 17,000 members in over 300 student organizations across the United States, the SWE's principal aims are to inform female students about opportunities in the field of engineering and to encourage female engineers to attain high levels of achievement.

In 1989, the American Society of Mechanical Engineers formed the Board on Minorities and Women, in response to the increasing importance of diversity. The mission of the Board is "to make the American Society of Mechanical Engineers a welcome place for all to participate and assume leadership roles in ASME activities and to encourage minorities and women to seek and retain careers in engineering." The board focuses on targeting women and minorities with leadership programs, diversity action grants, conferences, presentations, and training.

== Notable American women engineers (from time to time) ==
- Ellen Swallow Richards (1842–1911) – Known as the "mother of environmental engineering". Conducted first water quality studies of Massachusetts waters in 1870.
- Bertha Lamme Feicht (1869–1943) – First woman to receive a degree in engineering from Ohio State University and first female engineer to be hired by Westinghouse.
- Lillian Gilbreth (1878–1972) – One of the first working female engineers to obtain a PhD. Co-chair of Gilbreth Inc., which performed time and motion study.
- Edith Clarke (1883–1959) – First woman professional electrical engineer (EE), first woman graduate degree in EE from MIT, first woman professor of EE, first woman IEEE fellow.
- Nora Stanton Blatch Barney (1883–1971) – First woman to receive a degree in civil engineering from Cornell University, in 1905, when she was also accepted as a junior member of the American Society of Civil Engineers. However, she was later refused the society's associate membership.
- Olive Dennis (1885–1957) – Second woman to graduate from Cornell with a civil engineering degree, in 1920. She was initially hired by the Baltimore and Ohio Railroad as a draftsman but later became the first person to have the title of Service Engineer when it was created.
- Katherine Stinson (1891–1977) – First woman to work for the Civil Aeronautics Administration (later become known as the (Federal Aviation Administration). Named Aviation Pioneer of the Year in 1987.
- Barbara McClintock (1902–1992) – Notable contributor to the discipline now referred to as biomedical engineering. First recipient of the MacArthur Foundation Grant, and is a Nobel laureate.
- Grace Murray Hopper (1906–1992) – Developed first computer compiler as a research fellow at Harvard's Computational Laboratory. Invented COBOL programming language. First U.S citizen to become distinguished Fellow of British Computer Study.
- Mary G. Ross (1908–2008) – First Native American female engineer. She was one of the 40 founding engineers of the renowned and highly secretive Skunk Works project at Lockheed Corporation.
- Bessie Hall Dempsey (1914–1971) – First female engineer to be employed by Boeing, in 1948.
- Julia Tutelman Apter (1918–1979) – One of the first specialists in neurophysiological research, a founding member of the Biomedical Engineering Society, and an activist who worked to get more women in leadership positions.
- Beatrice Hicks (1919–1979) – Engineering degrees in both chemical and electrical engineering. Founding member of Society of Women Engineers (SWE). First woman hired at Western Electric Company.
- Thelma Estrin (1924–) – Professor Emerita, Department of Computer Science, at University of California at Los Angeles. Pioneering work in the fields of expert systems and biomedical engineering. Recipient of Superior Accomplishment Award From National Science Foundation.
- Lois Graham (1925–2013) – Professor of thermodynamics at IIT. First woman in engineering departments at RPI and IIT, and first woman to receive a PhD in mechanical engineering (1959). Fourth National President of the Society of Women Engineers.
- Nancy D. Fitzroy (1927–) – ASME's first woman president. In 1986, Dr. Fitzroy became the 105th president of ASME, where she helped form the ASME Industry Advisory Board.
- Mildred Dresselhaus (1930–2017) – Professor of Physics and Engineering at Massachusetts Institute of Technology (MIT). Awarded the National Medal of Science in 1990 in recognition of work on electronic properties of materials.
- Frances "Poppy" Northcutt (1943–) – First woman to work for NASA's Mission Control and conducted trajectory analysis for Apollo missions 8–17. Later, she became a lawyer, working for women's rights and civil rights.
- Elisabeth Pate-Cornell (1948–) – PhD in engineering with an emphasis in risk management. Distinguished Professor and Chair of Industrial Engineering at Stanford University. First female engineering faculty member from Stanford to be elected to National Academy of Engineering.
- Judith Resnik (1949–1986) – NASA Astronaut with a PhD in electrical engineering. Logged approximately 145 hours in orbit. Died in failed Challenger mission, and subsequently had the "Judith Resnik Award in Engineering" named in her honor.
- Bonnie Dunbar (1949–) – NASA astronaut and Bachelor of Science in Ceramic Engineering. Honored as the Rockwell International Engineer of the year in 1978.
- Denice Denton (1959–2006) – Electrical Engineering Professor and Dean of University of Washington. First woman in the United States to lead an engineering college of a major university.
- Rose Faghih – Associate Professor of Biomedical engineering at New York University Tandon School of Engineering. MIT Technology Review Innovators Under 35 for pioneering MINDWATCH. Institute of Electrical and Electronics Engineers Women in Engineering Magazine Woman to Watch and IEEE USA New Face of Engineering.
- Paige Kassalen (1993–) – American electrical engineer who was the only American, female engineer, and youngest member of the ground crew for the Solar Impulse 2 project.
- Mary Barra – First female CEO of a major global automaker. On December 10, 2013, GM named her to succeed Dan Akerson as chief executive officer, and prior to that, Barra served as the Executive Vice President of Global Product Development, Purchasing and Supply Chain at General Motors.
- Mahta Moghaddam – Iranian-American Electrical and Computer Engineer at the University of Southern California. Moghaddam is also the president of the IEEE Antennas and Propagation Society and is known for developing sensor systems and algorithms for high-resolution characterization of the environment to quantify the effects of climate change. She also has developed innovative tools using microwave technology to visualize biological structures and target them in real-time with high-power focused microwave ablation.
- Carlia S. Westcott – First woman to become a licensed marine engineer
- Gail Boydston – Chemical engineer at the Eli Lilly and Company, holding key hiring and training. Held instrumental role in developing new types of insulin and other chemicals.
- Elizabeth Messer – Aerospace engineer at NASA. First female engineer at NASA's Stennis Space Center. Led a team that developed and tested the Marshall Oxygen Cold-flow Facility.
- Rose Faghih – Associate Professor of Biomedical engineering at New York University Tandon School of Engineering. MIT Technology Review Innovators Under 35 for pioneering MINDWATCH. Institute of Electrical and Electronics Engineers Women in Engineering Magazine Woman to Watch and IEEE USA New Face of Engineering.

== Organizations to promote female engineering ==
- Society of Women Engineers [SWE)] – Nonprofit educational organization founded in 1950. SWE is the world's largest advocate and catalyst for change for women in engineering and technology. Membership currently numbers 38,000.
- Anita Borg Institute for Women and Technology – Nonprofit organization founded by computer scientist Anita Borg in 1997. Institute's primary aim is to recruit, retain, and advance women in technology.
- Grace Hopper Celebration of Women in Computing – Series of conferences designed in 1994 to bring research and career interests of women in computing to mainstream society. Currently a subset of the Anita Borg Institute, and the world's largest gathering of women in computing.
- IEEE Women in Engineering (WIE) – One of the largest international professional organizations dedicated to promoting women engineers and scientists and inspiring girls around the world to follow their academic interests to a career in engineering.
- Robogals – International student-run organization that aims to significantly increase the number of young women pursuing engineering as their future careers. Founded at University of Melbourne in July 1988, and has strong emphasis on robotics and electrical engineering.
- Phi Sigma Rho – Social sorority founded at Purdue University on September 24, 1984. Rashmi Khanna and Abby McDonald were the founders of Phi Sigma Rho. Khanna and McDonald were unable to participate in traditional sorority rushes due to the demands of their engineering program, so they decided to start their sorority instead. The Alpha chapter was founded with ten charter members: Gail Bonney, Anita Chatterjee, Ann Cullinan, Pam Kabbes, Rashmi Khanna, Abby McDonald, Christine Mooney, Tina Kershner, Michelle Self, and Kathy Vargo. Since the founding of the Alpha chapter in 1984, Phi Sigma Rho has grown to forty-five chapters nationally. Phi Sigma Rho has built a strong community for women in engineering and help foster the growth of women in engineering.

== See also ==
- Anita Borg Institute for Women and Technology
- Society of Women Engineers
- History of women in engineering
- Women, girls and information technology
- Women in science
- Women in computing
- Women in the workforce
- Feminization of the workplace
- Occupational sexism
- Women Who Code
