= Elizabeth Jones =

Elizabeth Jones may refer to:

== Elizabeth Jones ==
- Elizabeth Jones (engraver) (born 1935), Chief Engraver of the United States Mint
- Elizabeth Jones (silversmith) (fl. 1783–1795), English silversmith
- Elizabeth Jones, convicted in the Cleft chin murder case
- Elizabeth Ames Jones (born 1956), one of the three elected members of the Texas Railroad Commission
- A. Elizabeth Jones (born 1948), U.S. ambassador to Kazakhstan
- Elizabeth Jones (Mormonism) (1814–1895), Welsh inn owner and wife of Brigham Young
- Elizabeth Bolden (née Jones; 1890–2006), American supercentenarian
- Elizabeth Orton Jones (1910–2005), American illustrator
- Elizabeth Watkin Jones (1877–1966), Welsh writer
- Elizabeth Wilhelmina Jones (1869–1959), headmistress of Harrogate Ladies' College, and one of the pioneers of women's education
- Elizabeth W. Jones (1939–2008), American geneticist
- Elizabeth Jones (tennis) (born 1964), British tennis player
- Elizabeth Towne (née Jones; 1865–1960), American writer
- Elizabeth Lloyd Jones (1889–1952), Welsh scholar

== Liz Jones ==
- Liz Jones (born 1958), English journalist and writer
- Liz Jones (theatre director) (born 1946), Australian theatre director

== Bessie Jones ==
- Bessie Jones (American singer) (1902–1984), American singer
- Bessie Jones (Welsh singer) (1887–1974), Welsh singer
- Bessie Jones (schooner), a Maryland State Oyster Police Force schooner

== Betsy Jones ==
- Betsy Jones-Moreland (1930–2006), American actress

== See also ==
- Liz Fong-Jones (born 1987/1988), American activist and software developer
- Elisabeth Jones, counsel-general for Wales
- Elisabeth Inglis-Jones (1900–1994), Welsh novelist and biographer
- Elisabeth Micheler-Jones (born 1966), West German-German slalom canoeist
