= Fred Weibell =

- Born: October 18, 1927; Murray, Utah
- Died: August 6, 2015 August 6, 2015 (aged 87); Alpine, Utah
- Education: University of Utah; University of California, Los Angeles
- Occupation: Biomedical engineer

Fred John Weibell (October 18, 1927 – 2015) was an American biomedical engineer. He served for many years as the Secretary-Treasurer of the Biomedical Engineering Society (BMES). In 1992, he was the first recipient of the BMES Distinguished Service Award in recognition of his "extraordinary contributions to the Society."

Together with Leslie Cromwell and Erich A. Pfieffer, he was a coauthor of Biomedical Instrumentation and Measurements (Prentice Hall ISBN 0-13-076448-5). For several decades, this text has been "considered by many to be the 'Bible' for biomedical technicians," and is still used in the curriculum of colleges and universities worldwide.

He died August 6, 2015, from causes incident to age and Parkinson's disease.
