= John Richard C. King =

American politician

- King in June 2026 in a debate

Member of the South Carolina House of Representatives from the 49th district
- Incumbent
- Assumed office 2009
- Preceded by: Bessie Moody-Lawrence

Personal details
- Born: June 25, 1976 (age 50) Chester, South Carolina, U.S.
- Party: Democratic
- Education: Morehouse College (BA); Gupton-Jones College of Funeral Service (AAS); Strayer University (MEd)
- Occupation: Funeral director; politician

John Richard Christopher King (born June 25, 1976) is an American politician. He is a member of the South Carolina House of Representatives from the 49th District, serving since 2009. He is a member of the Democratic party. King previously served as a Chester city councilman from 1999 to 2000 and county councilman from 2000 to 2006. King is also a funeral director at Christopher King's Funeral Home in Chester, South Carolina, Professor at Clinton College in Rock Hill, SC.

King graduate from Morehouse College, Gupton-Jones College of Funeral Service, and Strayer University, and attended Charlotte School of Law.

King serves as 2nd Vice Chair of the House Judiciary Committee and is a member of the House Ethics Committee. He serves as an At-Large member of the National Black Caucus of State Legislatures.
