= Dell Sturges =

American politician (1890–1951)

- Sturges c. 1946

Member of the Connecticut House of Representatives from Redding
- In office 1945–1949 Serving with J. Harold Sanford (1945–1947); Harold Iles (1947–1949)
- Preceded by: J. Harold Sanford; Bessie Taylor
- Succeeded by: Harold Iles; Louise Schroeder

Personal details
- Born: Dell Raymond Carson; March 1890 Redding, Connecticut, U.S.
- Died: June 10, 1951 (aged 61) Danbury, Connecticut, U.S.
- Party: Republican
- Spouse: Frederick Sherman Sturges (m. 1914)
- Children: 2

Dell Raymond Sturges (March 1890 – June 10, 1951) was an American politician who served in the Connecticut House of Representatives from 1945 to 1949, representing the town of Redding as a Republican.

== Personal life ==
Dell Raymond Carson was born in Redding, Connecticut, in March 1890, to James and Mary Carson. She married Frederick Sherman Sturges in 1914, and they had two sons together, John and Philip. She was a Freemason and a member of Georgetown's chapter of the Order of the Eastern Star. She was also a member of the Daughters of the American Revolution.

== Political career ==
Sturges was first elected to the Connecticut House of Representatives in 1944, and she served two terms as one of two representatives from the town of Redding. She served her first term alongside J. Harold Sanford and the second alongside Harold Iles. Sturges lived in Georgetown during her tenure and was a member of the Education Committee and the Incorporations Committee.

== Death ==
Sturges died on June 10, 1951, at Danbury Hospital in Danbury, Connecticut. She was 61. Sturges was buried in Umpawaug Cemetery in Redding.
