= Isabella 'Marie' Imandt =

Journalist from Dundee, Scotland

Scottish journalist and foreign correspondent Isabella 'Marie' Imandt, from Dundee Central Library Local History Centre.

Isabella ‘Marie’ Imandt (1860 – 1945) was a female journalist from Dundee, Scotland, and one of the first female correspondents.

== Early life ==
Isabella ‘Marie’ Franziska Imandt was born in Dundee, Scotland in 1860. She was the daughter of local woman Anne McKenzie and Prussian immigrant Peter Imandt. Her father earned the nickname 'Red Wolf' when he was younger and was close friends with Karl Marx, as well as being a founding father of the German Social Democratic Party. The political activist moved to Dundee around 1856 and after marrying McKenzie, fathered three children and worked as a German teacher at the High School of Dundee, which Marie attended as a student. Highly intelligent and ambitious, Imandt was the first woman to graduate with Honours as a “Lady Literate in Arts” from the University of St Andrews - years before women could graduate in the same way as men - in 1880. She was fluent in both German and French.

== Career ==
She began working at D.C Thomson's newspaper the Dundee Courier when she was 27, supporting herself from her earnings which was unusual for women at the time. After seven years at the newspaper, she was paired with a fellow female journalist 10 years her junior at the newspaper, Bessie Maxwell, with Thomson sending them off on a year-long trip around the world to report on the lives of women globally. At the time, Thomson said “These ladies are not only intrepid, but they are shrewd and observant, are possessed of undoubted literary ability, and are in complete sympathy with the stupendous task in which they are about to engage.”

They began their journey on February 16, 1894, and letters of introduction preceded them at every stop on the trip, with two column reports and sketches filed every week for the Dundee Courier and Weekly News, with many of their articles syndicated in London newspapers. The women regularly found themselves in difficult situations, with Imandt writing in one of her columns about how Maxwell and she were forced to fight off French and Italian cabbies and porters who “simply rob the British female unless she can fight or has someone to fight for her”.

In the space of 12 months they travelled over 26,000 miles and visited 10 countries. Their reporting ranged from visiting a women's prison in China and women who had travelled to Seattle as ‘mail order brides’, to lighter fare such as attending a wedding in Turkey and shopping in Canada's largest department store. Upon returning from their assignment, the women were gifted gold bracelet watches and returned to their regular rounds at the Dundee Courier. They also gave lectures and presented talks on their experiences. Maxwell and Imandt's trip was immortalised in an exhibition at McManus Galleries in their home city of Dundee, Scotland. Imandt never married and inherited a significant sum when her father passed in 1897, his grave marked by a two-metre-high (6.6 ft) tomb she had commissioned in his honour.

== Death ==
She died in 1945, just a year before her colleague Bessie Maxwell's death in 1946. She was buried in Barnhill Cemetery, Dundee, next to her father. Her grave was proudly marked with her occupation: “journalist”.
