= Bessie Dwyer =

American librarian

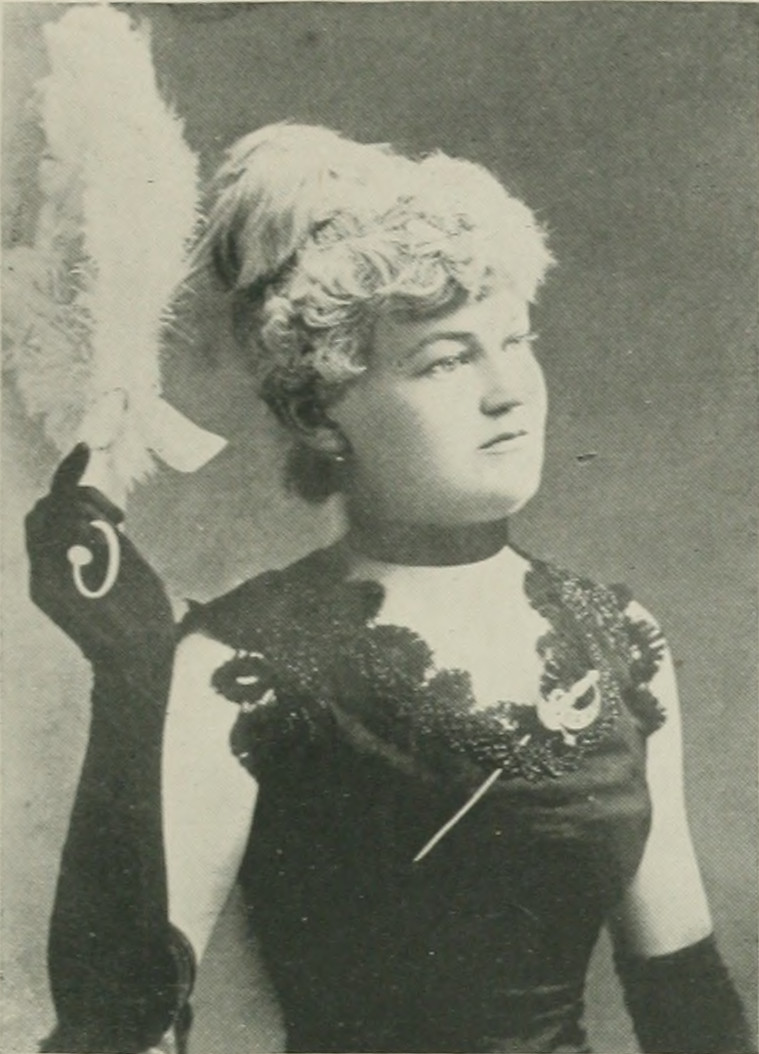
- Born: 1866; Nueces County
- Died: March 28, 1944; Santo Tomas Internment Camp
- Occupations: Journalist, writer, librarian

Elizabeth A. Dwyer (1866 – March 28, 1944) was the first woman to be appointed to the staff of the United States Library of Congress in 1893.

== Biography ==
Elizabeth Agnes Dwyer was born on September 29, 1866, in Bonita, Texas, to Judge Thomas A. and Annie (Croker) Dwyer. In 1882, she worked for the post office and for G. W. Baldwin and Company.

In 1890, she graduated from a San Antonio business college and in 1891 moved east to become a "congressional reporter" for the National Economist.

In 1893, Dwyer was appointed to the Library of Congress with the support of congressmen Roger Quarles Mills and James Slayden, who sent letters to the librarian John Russell Young requesting her promotion and transfer. Dwyer was making $900 annually by 1897, which was a lower pay for the staff at the Library of Congress. Her job title was simply "assistant." Dwyer worked in the Copyright Office, though in 1898 she wrote to John Young, reminding him of her trailblazing as the first prominent woman employee there, and requesting a transfer. Young asked David Hutcheson, the library superintendent, to transfer her to the Reading Room. Though Hutcheson claimed she was not strong enough to work there, Young transferred her, likely due to political pressure.

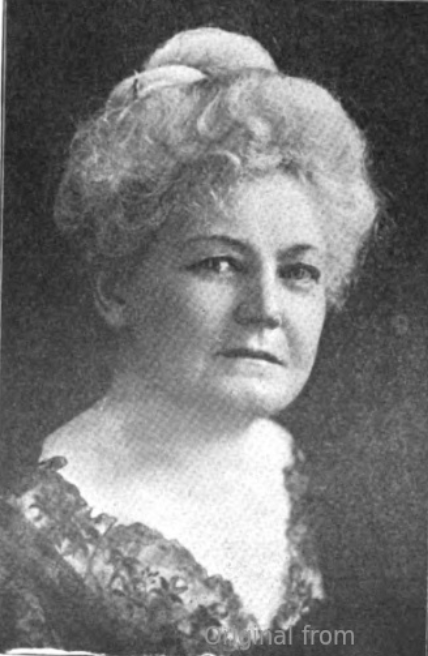
Bessie Dwyer (1919)

In 1903, Dwyer resigned from the Library of Congress and moved to the Philippines for a new library position. Her sister, Marie U. Nordstrom, took her place at the Library of Congress until the mid-1920s.
