= Julia Tutelman Apter =

Neurophysiologist and activist

Julia E Tutelman Apter
- Born: Julia Tutelman; April 7, 1918
- Died: April 16, 1979; Chicago, IL
- Education: University of Pennsylvania; Johns Hopkins University School of Medicine; Northwestern University; Ph.D. in mathematical biology University of Chicago 1964
- Occupations: Surgeon and opthamalogist
- Employer(s): Professor of Surgery, Rush Medical College
- Organization(s): Rush Medical College, Institute of Electrical and Electronics Engineers, Biomedical Engineering Society
- Known for: Mapping visual pathways, motor control, activism against sexism in biomedical research

Julia Tutelman Apter (1918-1979) was an American ophthalmologist, neurophysiologist, and biomedical engineer who was also known for her activism to support women in science.

== Education and career ==
Apter received her B.A. from the University of Pennsylvania in 1939. She earned an M.D. from Johns Hopkins University School of Medicine in 1943. She then received her M.S. from Northwestern University in 1959, and a Ph.D. in 1964 from the University of Chicago. Apter worked at multiple institutions including Johns Hopkins University School of Medicine, the University of Pennsylvania, and Northwestern University. She was a professor of surgery at the University of Illinois, and later became a professor of ophthalmology at Rush Medical College. She established a practice in ophthalmology in Chicago around 1976.

Apter was a founding member of the Biomedical Engineering Society. Apter proposed the idea of a Committee on Professional Opportunities for Women to Institute of Electrical and Electronics Engineers, and encouraged Thelma Estrin to join the committee.

Apter died in 1979 in Chicago of ovarian cancer.

== Research ==
She was one of the first specialists in neurophysiological research when she published her anatomical and functional mapping of the cat visual cortex in 1945. She is known for her work on how the reflex circuit of the eye operates, and she examined physical properties of the circulatory system. A portion of her work combined neuroscience with mathematical principles, and she worked on improving medical and scientific education and published about ways for medical students to use computer simulations of biological systems as part of their education. Apter's research included investigations into LSD and how it stimulates the human eye to produce visual images. Using cats as a model system, she detailed how LSD reversed potential overdoses of sleeping pills.

== Advocacy ==
Apter also actively worked to improve opportunities for women in science. In the early 1970s, Apter raised concerns about the lack of women on panels charged with reviewing applications for grant funding in the United States. Apter herself was informed that she was not welcome on review panels because of her work advocating for women. One of her colleagues noted that Apter was not always easy to get along with, and at one point Apter was locked out of her office during a disagreement with the administration at her hospital.

Apter was a lead plaintiff in an unsuccessful 1973 class action suit, Apter v. Richardson. Elliot Richardson was the secretary of the United States Department of Health, Education and Welfare. Apter was the spokesperson for the group of professional organizations involved in the suit. The case was initially dismissed when the court ruled she had no right to sue the government, but in 1973 she was given the right to sue. Apter charged she was denied from the National Institutes of Health based on her gender and activism for women in science. Apter and colleagues demonstrated there were many highly qualified women who could serve on grant review committees and compiled lists of names and credentials that were subsequently used to select women for grant review roles. While the suit was not successful, afterwards more women were placed on grant review committees who dispersed US funding for scientific research.

In 1974, Apter was one of eleven workers in the Food and Drug Administration who testified before a Senate committee that "their superiors harassed, transferred and at times overruled them when they produced negative findings in studies of drugs to be offered to the public by the country's drug industry".
