= Bessie Taylor =

American politician (1896–1974)

Member of the Connecticut House of Representatives from Redding
- In office 1941–1945 Serving with Fred A. Judd (1941–1943); J. Harold Sanford (1943–1945)
- Preceded by: Fred A. Judd; Hjalmar Anderson
- Succeeded by: J. Harold Sanford; Dell Sturges

Personal details
- Born: Bessie Hazen; February 9, 1896 Redding, Connecticut, U.S.
- Died: January 22, 1974 (aged 77) Danbury, Connecticut, U.S.
- Party: Republican
- Spouse: Leonard B. Taylor

Bessie Taylor (February 9, 1896 – January 22, 1974) was an American politician who served in the Connecticut House of Representatives from 1941 to 1945, representing the town of Redding as a Republican. Her father, William E. Hazen, was also a state representative.
