= Bessie Olive Cole =

American pharmacist

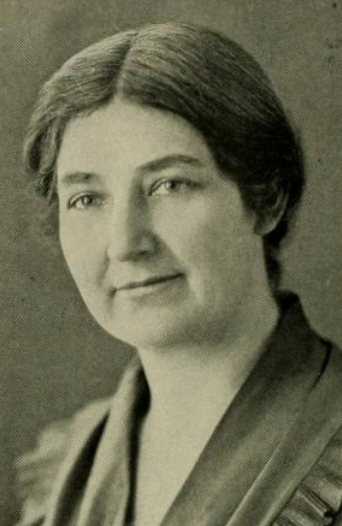
- Bessie Olive Cole, from the 1926 yearbook of the University of Maryland
- Born: November 14, 1883; Mount Carmel, Maryland
- Died: June 5, 1971 (aged 87)
- Education: University of Maryland Francis King Carey School of Law
- Occupation: Pharmacist

Bessie Olive Cole (1883–1971) was an American pharmacist, called "The first lady of Pharmacy in Maryland".

== Biography ==
She was born in Mount Carmel, Baltimore County on November 14, 1883, daughter of Jordan B. Cole and Nancy Ellen Wheeler. In Reisterstown she graduated from Franklin High School. Spending one year at Baltimore Business College, Cole graduated in 1903. She first began by working for Merck & Co. as a stenographer. She subsequently left Merck to attend the University of Maryland School of Pharmacy, receiving a Doctor of Pharmacy in 1913, and graduating with the highest grade in her class.

Three years after graduating, she received a job working at the Solway-Annan Company, and working part-time at the War Risk Department in Washington, which she would hold for four years. Following her departure from her public work, she was employed at the University of Maryland School of Pharmacy as Secretary of the faculty, until retiring in 1953. The same year she was hired by the University of Maryland, she also enrolled in the University of Maryland School of Law, becoming the first female to receive a degree from that school. Though she never used it, she was a licensed attorney for many years. Additionally, from 1948 to 1949, Cole was dean of the School of Pharmacy. Throughout her life, she studied (at various times) English, history, and economics at Johns Hopkins University.

She was a member of Maryland Pharmacists Association, the American Pharmaceutical Association and the Epsilon chapter of Lambda Kappa Sigma pharmacy sorority. She served as President of the Baltimore Branch of the American Pharmaceutical Association. The B. Olive Cole Pharmacy Museum was founded in her memory. She died on June 5, 1971.

Tonight we honor one who has achieved many unique distinctions. She was one of the first women to graduate from the University of Maryland School of Pharmacy; First woman to receive a law degree from the School of Law at the University of Maryland; First woman to be Acting Dean of our School of Pharmacy; First woman to hold a full professorship at the School of Pharmacy; First woman Honorary President of Maryland Pharmaceutical Association; First woman Honorary President of Alumni Association, School of Pharmacy; and First woman to receive the Alumni Medal. Hail to the lady of many firsts—the first lady of Pharmacy in Maryland

— Francis S. Balassone
