= Bessie Brown Mention =

Suffragist and activist

Bessie Brown Mention (1873–1946) was an American suffragist and activist for women of color and migrant workers. She focused her attention mainly on welfare for migrant workers, and overall helped to monitor the working conditions of African American migrant women in the state of New Jersey. Bessie Brown Mention also took part in numerous organizations to aid in the suffragist movement. These organizations included: the Migrant Welfare Committee, the Colored Women's Republican Club (CWRC), and the New Jersey Colored Republican Women Voters (NJCRWV). She also took part in politics during her career, focusing her work at the Republican National Convention in 1928.

== Background ==
=== Personal life ===
Bessie Brown Mention was born in 1873. Her mother was from New Jersey and her father was from Virginia. She grew up with three siblings, one sister and two brothers. She married her husband, George M. Mention on March 19, 1896. After getting married, the couple moved to Princeton, New Jersey in 1896. The couple never had children and stayed in New Jersey, where Bessie did most of her work. She died at the age of 73 on May 17, 1946.

== Career ==
Bessie Brown Mention did a lot of work in welfare, specifically focusing on migrant workers and helping them. She was a member of the Migrant Welfare Committee, which helped monitor the working conditions of African-American migrant women in New Jersey. Overall, she helped a lot of women, especially migrant women, with their working rights and working conditions.

=== Suffragist movement ===
In addition to her work with migrant workers and African-American women in New Jersey, she was a prevalent piece in the suffragist movement in New Jersey. Most prominently, she was a part of two groups who helped women learn their voting rights and work to help women gain more political rights.

In early suffragist movements, colored women were not given a voice and so they created their own conferences and suffragist groups. One of these was the Colored Women's Republican Club (CWRC), founded in Denver in 1894. From this, more clubs started popping up around the country and another suffragist, Florence Randolph, started to organize Republican clubs in New Jersey; in 1920, she held the first statewide political conference for black women in 1922. This conference continued and Bessie Brown Mentions was the state chairman for the conference in 1924. Another club that Bessie was very involved in was the New Jersey Colored Republican Women Voters (NJCRWV). Bessie was the president of this club from 1926-1929. In 1929, the group held a conference in Atlantic City, which covered topics from why women should be in politics, how to create more conferences like this, and the 13-15th amendments.

=== Participation in politics ===
Her prominent work was in the clubs, organizations, and work with migrant workers, but Bessie also had some involvement in politics. She was the alternate delegate from New Jersey at the Republican National Convention in 1928. She also ran for office twice- specifically for a spot on the Republican County Committee in the Sixth District of New Jersey in 1929 and for a Republican seat on the county committee in the Fifth District in 1931. However, she lost both of these races and never took office.
