= Bessie Downes =

Botanical artist

- Born: 1860; Leeds, England
- Died: 21 May 1920 (aged 59–60)
- Spouse: James Charles Downes (married 1907)
- Children: 0

Bessie (Elizabeth) Downes (1860–1920) was a botanical artist, especially of the plants found around Southport on the Sefton coast of Lancashire, UK.

She was born in 1860 to Thomas Ralph and Mary Collinson in Leeds, the youngest of their six children. She lived independently from a family inheritance, moving to Hull and then to Southport by 1899. In 1907 she married James Charles Downes, a retired widower with four adult children. She died on 21 May 1920.

She joined the Southport Society of Natural Science in 1902 and continued as a member after her marriage. The society included a botanical special interest section. Her skill as an artist is shown in her surviving paintings. There are 314 watercolours, held initially at the Botanic Garden Museum in Southport but now at the Atkinson in Southport. These are mainly of flowers but also include sea shells, bird's eggs and butterflies. Herbarium sheets that match some of the paintings are also in the collection. The paintings are dated between 1890 and 1917. They are predominantly of plants from the Southport coast but also include some cultivated plants and ones from places that she either visited or received specimens from. These include Wensleydale, Dovedale, Bescar, Morecombe, Burnley, Ashover and Bridlington in the UK and Mount Pilatus and Rigi in Switzerland.

As well as the artistic quality of her work, the watercolour are significant as evidence of the flora of the Sefton coast, a sand-dune system prior to changes caused by agriculture and urban growth during the twentieth century.

== Legacy ==
In 2016 and 2017, exhibits at the Atkinson were funded by The Royal Society, as one of their Local Heroes projects. There was an exhibition of her work at the Atkinson from June to September 2019.
