= Bessie Moody-Lawrence =

American politician

Member of the South Carolina House of Representatives from the 49th district
- In office 1993–2009
- Preceded by: Sam R. Foster Sr.
- Succeeded by: John Richard C. King

Personal details
- Born: February 14, 1941 Chester County, South Carolina
- Died: December 18, 2012 (aged 71) Rock Hill, South Carolina
- Party: Democratic
- Spouses: Lindberg Moody (died 1980); Earl Lawrence (died 2008)

Bessie Ayers Moody-Lawrence (February 14, 1941 – December 18, 2012) was an American politician.

Born in Chester County, South Carolina, Moody-Lawrence taught at Winthrop University. Moody-Lawrence then served in the South Carolina House of Representatives as a Democrat from 1993 to 2007 in York County, South Carolina. Moody-Lawrence died at her home in Rock Hill, South Carolina from brain cancer.
