= Bessie Bennett =

American jewelry designer and museum curator

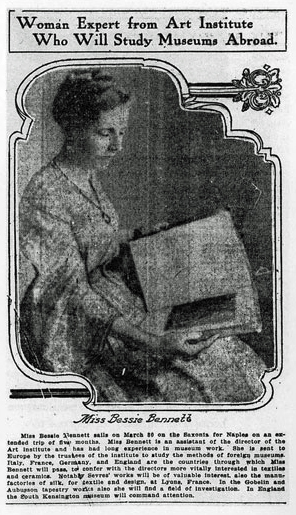
- Born: March 7, 1870; Cincinnati, Ohio
- Died: March 23, 1939 (aged 69)
- Known for: Metalworking, Curator, Educator
- Movement: Arts and Crafts

Bessie Bennett (1870 – 1939) was an American jewelry designer, teacher, and museum curator. In 1914 she was named Curator of Decorative Art at the Art Institute of Chicago, the first woman to become a curator at a major museum in the United States.

== Life ==
Bennett was born in Cincinnati, Ohio on March 7, 1870. She attended the Art Institute of Chicago from 1895 to 1898. She began teaching decorative design courses at the Art Institute. Simultaneously she was working for the museum as assistant to the Director of Textiles and Decorative Objects.

Bennett had her own metalworking studio in Chicago, and in 1907 she won the Art Institute Arts and Crafts medal at the Annual Exhibition of Applied Arts.

Bennett became the Curator of Decorative Arts of the Art Institute of Chicago in December 1914. Bennett worked to expand the decorative arts collection of the Art Institute, and the space available to display it.

She died on March 23, 1939.

== Legacy ==
After her death, the Art Institute of Chicago established the Bessie Bennett Endowment Fund.
