= Bessie Louise Pierce =

American historian (1888–1974)

- Born: April 20, 1886; Caro, Michigan, U.S.
- Died: October 3, 1974 (aged 88); Iowa City, Iowa, U.S.
- Occupation: Historian

Bessie Louise Pierce (April 20, 1886 – October 3, 1974) was an American historian known for her three-volume work, A History of Chicago.

Pierce was born in Caro, Michigan, and grew up in Waverly, Iowa. She earned her bachelor's degree at the University of Iowa and obtained a master's degree at the University of Chicago in 1918. She joined the faculty of the University of Iowa history department under Arthur M. Schlesinger, Sr., who urged her to get a doctorate.

In 1929, she returned to the University of Chicago at the request of Charles Edward Merriam to oversee the History of Chicago project. For the Century of Progress in 1933, she wrote As Others See Chicago: Impressions of Visitors, 1673–1933. She then began her most notable work, A History of Chicago. The first two volumes were published in 1937 and 1940. She was awarded a Guggenheim Fellowship in 1955. She completed the third volume in 1957, three years after she retired and became a professor emeritus. Pierce began work on a fourth volume, which was to cover the years 1894 to 1915, but it was never completed. She returned to Iowa in 1973 and died the following year.

== Notable works ==
- As Others See Chicago: Impressions of Visitors, 1673–1933. Chicago: University of Chicago Press, 1933.
- A History of Chicago, volume 1: The Beginning of a City, 1673-1848. New York : A.A. Knopf, 1937. Reprinted by the University of Chicago Press, 2007. ISBN 978-0-226-66839-0
- A History of Chicago, volume 2: From Town to City, 1848-1871. New York : A.A. Knopf, 1940. Reprinted by the University of Chicago Press, 2007. ISBN 978-0-226-66840-6
- A History of Chicago, volume 3: The Rise of a Modern City, 1871-1893. New York : A.A. Knopf, 1957. Reprinted by the University of Chicago Press, 2007, ISBN 978-0-226-66842-0
