= Bessie Morse =

American educator

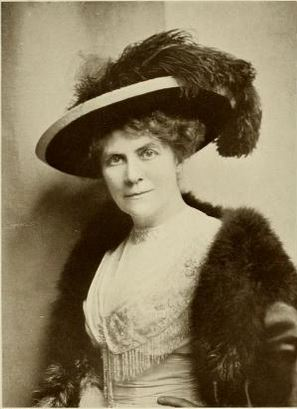
Bessie Morse, Kajiwara Photo

Elizabeth Morse (1869 – January 10, 1948) founded the Morse School of Expression in 1907.

== Biography ==
Bessie Morse grew up in a farm in Jefferson County, Missouri, and later moved to De Soto, Missouri.

She attended a country school until thirteen years old, then the De Soto High School, the Kirksville Normal School, Soper School of Oratory in Chicago, and schools of that kind in Boston and New York. In New York she assisted the principal of the American Academy of Dramatic Art, and since then she visited every year in Boston and Chicago for the purpose of getting new ideas.

She moved from DeSoto to St. Louis in 1900. She conducted private classes in her studio for five years. Before that she traveled under the management of a lyceum bureau as a reader, touring the North, South and West under their auspices, also giving private recitals during that time. For ten years Morse gave lecture recitals.

The Morse School of Expression was founded by Bessie Morse in 1907 and was hosted in the Musical Arts Building, at 457 Boyle Avenue, St. Louis. Morse was also principal of the school. Moreover, she acted as judge in declamatory contests. According to the St. Louis Star "her success is due to her thorough understanding of her chosen art, to her admirable personality, also her zeal and devotion to her profession. The Morse School of Expression was among the best equipped dramatic schools in the Middle West.

The Morse School of Expression taught elocution, oratory, literature, dramatic art, physical culture, and aesthetic dancing. The method adopted by Morse, who was also a well-known platform lecturer, was that of natural expression. The central idea was the training of the mind, body and voice at the same time. When the voice was thoroughly trained it responded perfectly to every thought, and the body likewise, so that there was perfect harmony.

Among the graduates Morse sent out from her school who were distinguishing themselves were: Maud W. Barnes, director of the Department of Expression in Ouachita College, Arkadelphia, Arkansas, one of the largest seminaries in that State; Valerine Dunn, who went first with the Suburban Stock Company, and then was director of the Department of expression in the Visitation Convent of Mobile, Alabama; Mina Pearl Finger of Marissa, Illinois, who occupied the same position for the Lindenwood College, St. Charles, Missouri; Eunice Green, connected with the Sacred Heart Convent in St. Charles, where she was the director of physical culture; Naomi Weston Childers, gained success as the ingenue in the "Madame X" Company of Henry W. Savage; Geraldine Albert, teacher of Expression in the Academy of the Visitation, St. Louis; Madeline McNabb, studied in Boston and made a reputation in that city; Caroline Delano Johnson, of St. Louis, Cathryn Cravens, commentator on radio, Kathrine Snodgrass, also known as Jane Porter, who conducted the Magic Kitchen program on radio, Therese Wittler, winner of the Samuel French award and Marjorie Moffett, actress and impersonator.

Morse's school was the only one of its kind conducted by a white woman in St. Louis.

In 1917 Morse wrote Principles of Expression, which she used as a text book in her school. She later wrote The Art of Speech.

In 1923 she spent a summer in Honolulu giving recitals in private homes, and the next winter did the same in New York City.

She was a charter member of the Society of St. Louis Authors and a member of the Cornelia Green Chapter of the Daughters of the American Revolution.

She died January 10, 1948, and is buried in the Old Cemetery at DeSoto, Missouri.
