= Bessie Pocock =

Australian nursing sister and army matron (1863–1946)

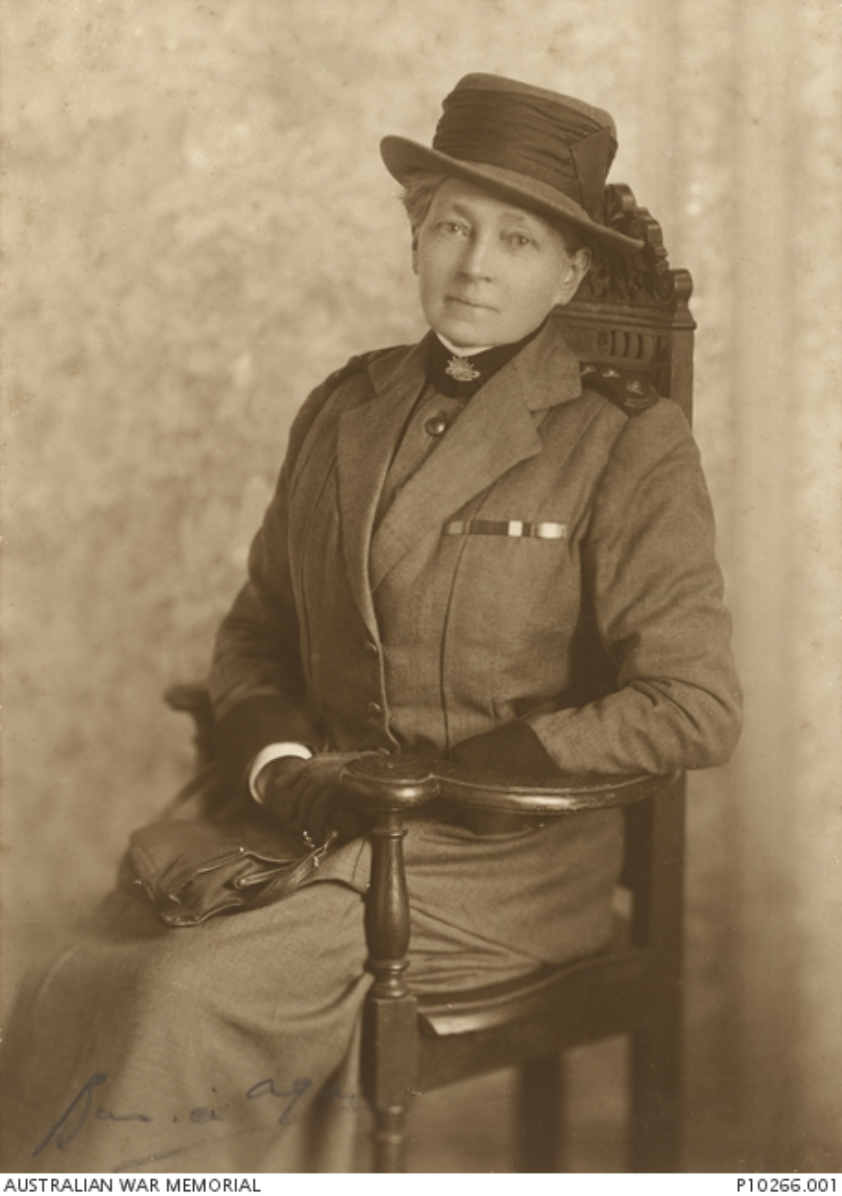
- Pocock, c. 1919
- Born: 20 July 1863; Dalby, Queensland, Australia
- Died: 16 July 1946 (aged 82); Grafton, New South Wales, Australia
- Military career
- Allegiance: Colony of New South Wales; Australia
- Branch: New South Wales Army Nursing Service Reserve; Australian Imperial Force
- Service years: 1899–1903; 1914–1919
- Rank: Sister
- Unit: Australian Army Nursing Service
- Conflicts: Second Boer War; First World War
- Awards: Associate Royal Red Cross; Mentioned in Despatches

Mary Anne Pocock, ARRC (20 July 1863 – 16 July 1946), commonly known as Bessie Pocock, was an Australian nursing sister and army matron who served in the Second Boer War and the First World War. She was awarded the Associate Royal Red Cross and thrice Mentioned in Despatches for her wartime service.

== Early life ==
Pocock was born in Dalby, Queensland, on 20 July 1863 to Mary Ann (née O'Toole) and George Pocock. She was the first of their eight children. Her mother was born in Ireland and her English father became a blacksmith at Copmanhurst. The family home was called "The Punchbowl" and it was in Grafton, New South Wales. She qualified as a nurse at Sydney Hospital in 1890 and in 1899 she joined the New South Wales Army Nursing Service Reserve.

== Military service ==
When the New South Wales second contingent was sent to South Africa to fight in the Second Boer War, Pocock was one of fourteen nurses of the New South Wales Army Nursing Service Reserve chosen to also make that journey. She travelled aboard the SS Moravian in 1900. She worked in hospitals in Johannesburg and the Transvaal before she caught endemic fever. She was sent home via the United Kingdom in 1902 and returned to Australia in 1903. She was awarded the Queen's South Africa Medal and the King's South Africa Medal and Mentioned in Despatches for her service.

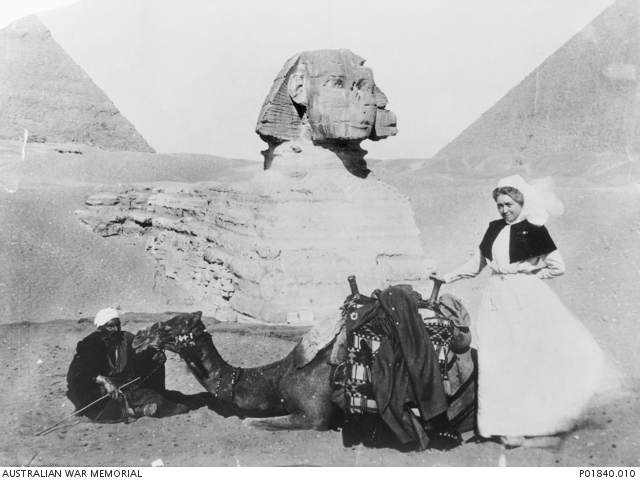
Pocock in Egypt in 1916

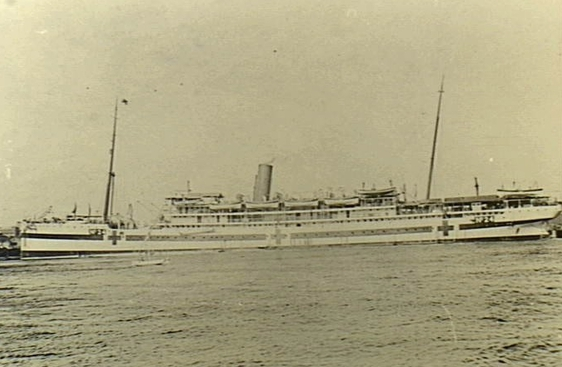
The hospital ship Assaye in 1915 was ferrying wounded from Gallipoli

By December 1914, the First World War had started and Pocock was already in Cairo as part of the Australian Imperial Force. She was a senior sister with No. 2 Australian General Hospital and she worked there and at a temporary hospital at the city of Ismailia. For over six months starting in July 1915 she was in charge and looking after wounded soldiers as they were ferried from the Gallipoli campaign. She cared for them on the hospital ship Assaye as it travelled between Alexandria and Gallipoli and then on to Malta and the United Kingdom before returning again to Alexandria.

In July 1916, Pocock moved from Marseilles and Wimereux in France to the 2nd Australian Casualty Clearing Station in Trois Arbres near Steenwerck. In that month, a cemetery was started for the station. This became the basis for a much larger one after the war had finished. Her final thirteen months of war service was in Dartmouth in England with No. 3 Australian Auxiliary Hospital. She was twice Mentioned in Despatches and was awarded the Associate Royal Red Cross for her wartime service.

Pocock died in Grafton on 16 July 1946. Over 100 pages of her letters which were sent home to her family are in the Australian War Memorial, Canberra.
