= Bessie Maxwell =

American journalist

Scottish journalist Bessie Maxwell, from Dundee Central Library Local History Centre.

Elizabeth Maxwell (7 March 1871 – 29 December 1946) was one of the first female journalists and foreign correspondents.

== Early life ==
One of four children, Maxwell was born on 7 March 1871. She was born in Dundee to a family of journalists. In her teens, she attended the High School of Dundee where she excelled in the arts. Upon graduation she attended University College, Dundee, which was one of the few institutions that accepted women at the time. Her great-grandfather was the first editor of newspaper The Peoples Choice and her father had also worked as an editor as well.

== Career ==
Her first professional job was with famous newspaperman, D.C Thomson, who tasked her with one of the first foreign correspondent roles for a woman at the age of 23. Along with fellow journalist Isabella 'Marie' Imandt, Maxwell was tasked with travelling the world over the course of one year to report on women's position globally for the Dundee Courier. The previous year, a group of male reporters had been sent, however, Thomson wanted to read articles from a female perspective.

The women interviewed subjects everywhere from India and Japan, to the United States and Africa, filing copy via letters that they penned on the road. The articles were published in the Dundee Courier over the course of 12 months, with the women embarking on travel that was unheard of for females – let alone female reporters – in the late nineteenth century. On the eve of their trip, Thomson said the women were "about to enter upon an enterprise that will stand unique and unparalleled among the greatest achievements in journalism". Upon her return, Maxwell continued to work as a journalist, writing articles for publications such as the Weekly News. She famously reported on the working conditions of miners by travelling down into a coal mine in Fife, Scotland. Her sister, Annie Maxwell, also became a writer at the Dundee Courier in 1896 and worked there for over forty years.

Maxwell and Imandt's trip was immortalised in an exhibition at McManus Galleries in their home city of Dundee, Scotland and in a book produced by the Abertay Historical Society.

== Death ==
After moving to England, Maxwell married painter Arthur Pitt Taylor who was some twenty years her senior. She outlived her husband by several decades and died in Dundee on 29 December 1946. Marie Imandt died in 1945.
