= Bessie Mae Kelley =

American animator (fl. 1920s)

Bessie Mae Kelley, c.1920s

Bessie Mae Kelley (fl. 1920s) was an early American animator. Her work is believed to be the earliest surviving hand-drawn animation drawn and directed by a woman.

Kelley began her career in animation late in 1917, working her way up through the ranks, cleaning cels and assistant animating, before quickly animating at Bray Studios. She contributed animation to Fleischer Studios' Koko the Clown series and others, before directing and animating short films. These included Gasoline Alley (1920) and Flower Fairies (1921) and A Merry Christmas (1922) in Chicago. She also contributed character designs and animations to Paul Terry's "Aesop’s Fables" series.

She developed the earliest animated mouse couple, "Roderick and Gladys", while animating at Bray Studios. Kelley brought her characters to Fables Studio with Paul Terry in the early Aesop's Fables series, drawing a mouse couple later named "Milton and Mary," (and other names), which predated the creation of Mickey and Minnie Mouse.

Kelley's work remained largely unknown until her collection was rediscovered and two of her surviving films were restored by animation historian Mindy Johnson in 2022. Johnson discovered Kelley in an article posted in a vintage vaudeville publication. Bessie Mae Kelley was also found in series of images of male animators from the early 1920s. Other historians had previously assumed her to be a secretary or cleaning woman. In addition to her work as a pioneering animator, Kelley was also a rare example of a woman touring nationally to promote early animation. In the early 1920s, she traveled across the United States, giving live demonstrations of the animation process, combining technical explanations with humor and performance. Kelley would draw and animate her characters on stage in real time, educating audiences about the mechanics behind the art form. According to the American Film Institute, these public appearances showcased both her talents as a skilled artist as well as presenter, offering the audience an insight into the animation process behind the scenes.
