= Bessie Bown Ricker =

American performer

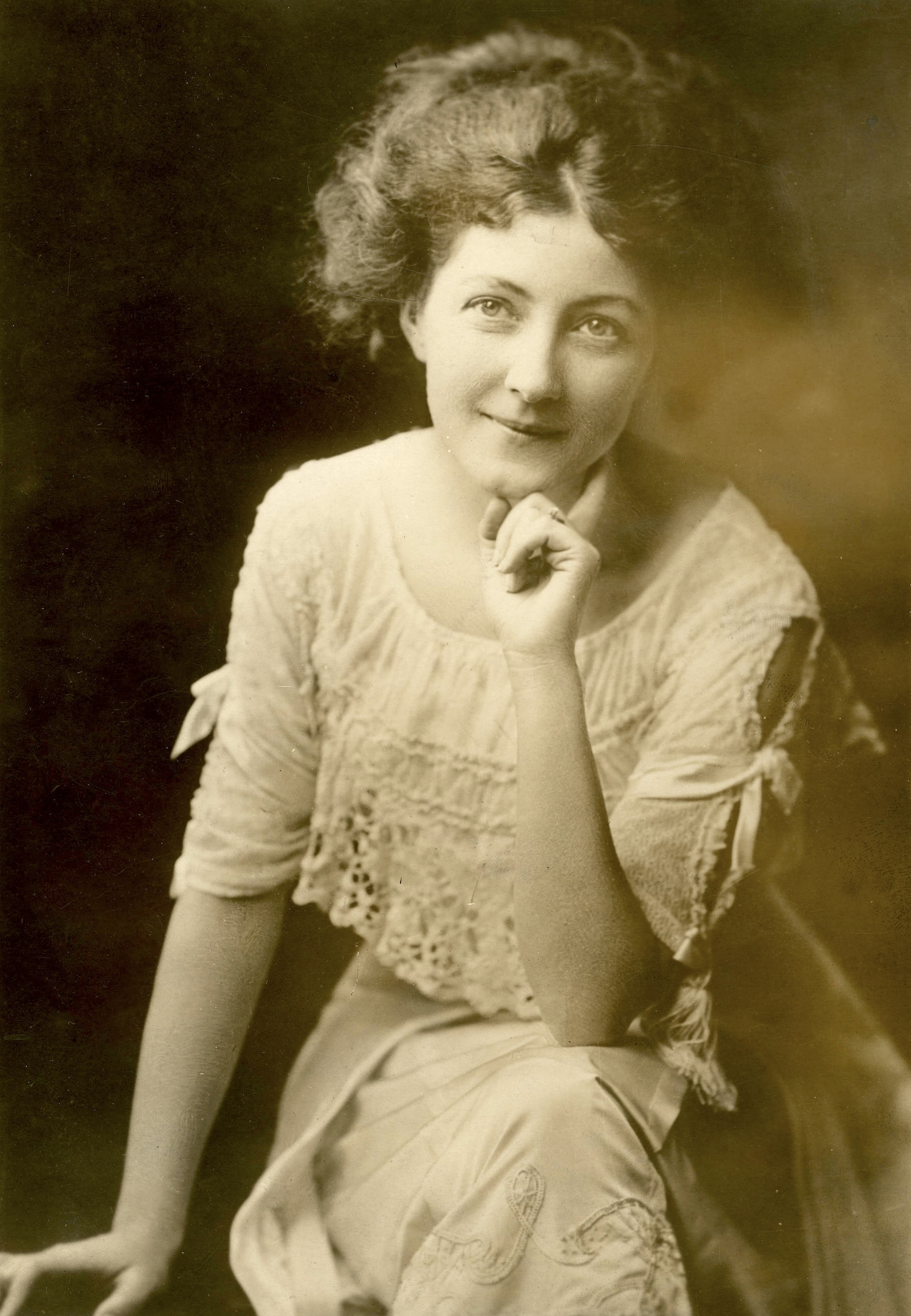
- Born: Bessie Digby Bown; January 4, 1872; Wheeling, West Virginia, U.S.
- Died: June 30, 1953 (age 81); Saint Louis, Missouri, U.S.
- Occupation(s): Vaudeville performer, elocutionist

Bessie Digby Bown Ricker (January 4, 1872 – June 30, 1953) was an American performer popular on the vaudeville stage, "one of the best known entertainers in St. Louis." Her specialties were impersonating child characters in monologues, and giving readings of children's stories and verse. She went to France during World War I to entertain American troops there.

== Early life and education ==
Bown was born in Wheeling, West Virginia, and raised in Kirkwood, Missouri, the daughter of W. J. H. Bown and Mary Digby Bown. Her father worked at a coffee and spice company. She studied at the Columbia School of Oratory in Chicago, and worked with singer Carrie Jacobs Bond.

== Career ==
Ricker gave poetry readings and impersonations, especially of child characters, but also sang, danced, acted and wrote for the stage for over forty years. In 1918 she went overseas with the YMCA, to entertain American troops in World War I. She made three recordings of recitations for the Victor label in 1923. She co-directed an amateur entertainment to benefit a scholarship fund in Saint Louis in 1926. She was an active member of the Wednesday Club in Saint Louis.

== Personal life ==
Bown married businessman William L. Ricker. She died in 1953, at the age of 81, in Saint Louis, Missouri.
