= Elizabeth Jones (silversmith) =

British artist

- Occupation: Silversmith

Elizabeth Jones was an English silversmith.

It is believed that Jones was the widow of one Robert Jones, but this is uncertain. She is known to have registered her mark on 15 January 1783 and has been ascribed an address of 49 Bartholomew Close; her occupation at this time was listed as plateworker. She specialized in the production of salvers and trays, and numerous trays by her shop have survived. No record either of apprenticeship or of freedom has been found.

Two pieces by Jones are in the collection of the National Museum of Women in the Arts, a George III teapot stand of 1783 and a George III tray of 1795.
