= Bessie Blount =

Bessie Blount may refer to:

- Bessie Blount (mistress of Henry VIII) (c. 1500–c. 1540), Henry VIII of England's mistress and mother of his son, Henry Fitzroy
- Bessie Blount Griffin (1914–2009), American physical therapist, inventor, and forensic scientist
