= Bessie Hall Dempsey =

American aeronautical engineer

Bessie Hall Dempsey became the first female engineer employed by Boeing in 1948. She studied mechanical engineering and then remained at Boeing for 23 years. She died after a long illness on September 16, 1971. A collection of materials about her life was made available by her son at the Museum of History & Industry.

== Early life ==
Born "Bessie Marie Leister" (October 5, 1914) in Arkansas, she showed an early interest in dance. Bessie's parents divorced when she was four years old. Her mother, Jessie Des Champs, moved to Montana with her two daughters and changed their last name to Hall when Jessie remarried. Her mother again divorced, taking the sisters to Seattle. While in Missoula, Jessie operated a seamstress studio, often designing costumes. In Seattle, the family lived next to a Vaudeville theater. During the Great Depression, the family moved to California for work in show business.

== Dance career ==
With her older sister Irma Beatrice, the Hall Sisters performed Vaudeville shows around the Northwest in the late 1920s. Her passion for dance and choreography led her to study classical ballet, folk dance, music theory, composition and choreography at the Cornish School for Fine Arts. She also performed ballet and in films in both San Francisco and Los Angeles under the stage name Yvonne St. Clair. While in California, she met and married Lee Dempsey, a former New York Giants baseball player. The couple had one child, Herbert Lee (Mark) Dempsey. At this time, she began pursuing a degree in mechanical engineering from the University of Southern California. There she specialized in aerodynamics and graduated in the top 10 percent of her class. In 1949, the couple divorced and she kept custody of her son.

== Engineering career ==
After graduating in 1947, Bessie was hired by Boeing in Seattle, where she moved after her divorce. Competition was high for engineering jobs at the time. To disguise her gender, Bessie used the name B.H. Dempsey professionally and was promoted within the company. She broke additional gender barriers, becoming the first woman elected to professional honorary society Tau Beta Pi in 1951. Despite her engineering career, she still participated in local arts performances.
