= University of Chicago =

Private university in Chicago, Illinois, US

- Motto: Crescat scientia; vita excolatur (Latin)
- Motto in English: "Let knowledge grow from more to more; and so be human life enriched"
- Type: Private research university
- Established: 1890; 136 years ago
- Founder: John D. Rockefeller
- Accreditation: HLC
- Academic affiliations: AAU; NAICU; URA
- Endowment: $10.9 billion (2026)
- President: Paul Alivisatos
- Faculty: 3,418 (2023)
- Administrative staff: 23,217 (2023)
- Students: 18,732 (2025)
- Undergraduates: 7,496 (2025)
- Postgraduates: 11,195 (2025)
- Other students: 408 (non-degree seeking, 2025)
- Location: Chicago, Illinois, United States; 41°47′23″N 87°35′59″W
- Campus: 217 acres (87.8 ha) (main campus); Large city
- Other campuses: Beijing; Delhi; Hong Kong; London; Luxor; Paris
- Newspaper: The Chicago Maroon
- Colors: Maroon
- Nickname: Maroons
- Sporting affiliations: NCAA Division III –: UAA; MWC
- Mascot: Phil the Phoenix
- Website: uchicago.edu

The University of Chicago (UChicago, Chicago, UChi, or U of C) is a private research university in the Hyde Park community area of Chicago, Illinois, United States.

The university is composed of an undergraduate college and four graduate research divisions: the Arts & Humanities Division, the Biological Sciences Division, the Physical Sciences Division, and the Social Sciences Division, all of which include various organized departments and institutes. In addition, the university operates seven professional schools in the fields of business, social work, theology, public policy, law, medicine, and molecular engineering, along with a school of continuing studies. The university maintains an overseas campus in Hong Kong, as well as academic centers in London, Paris, Beijing, Delhi, Luxor, and downtown Chicago.

University of Chicago scholars have played a role in the development of many academic disciplines, including economics, law, literary criticism, mathematics, physics, religion, sociology, and political science, establishing the Chicago schools of thought in various fields. The university's Metallurgical Laboratory produced the world's first human-made, self-sustaining nuclear reaction in Chicago Pile-1 beneath the viewing stands of the university's Stagg Field. Advances in chemistry led to the "radiocarbon revolution" in the carbon-14 dating of ancient life and objects. The university operates and administers research institutions including Fermi National Accelerator Laboratory and Argonne National Laboratory. The University of Chicago Press is the largest university press in North America.

As of 2026, the university's students, faculty, and staff have included 102 Nobel laureates. The university's faculty members and alumni also include 11 Fields Medalists, 4 Turing Award winners, 2 Dan David Prize winners, 58 MacArthur Fellows, 30 Marshall Scholars, 56 Rhodes Scholars, 29 Pulitzer Prize winners, 20 National Humanities Medalists, and 6 Olympic medalists.

== History ==
=== Old University of Chicago ===
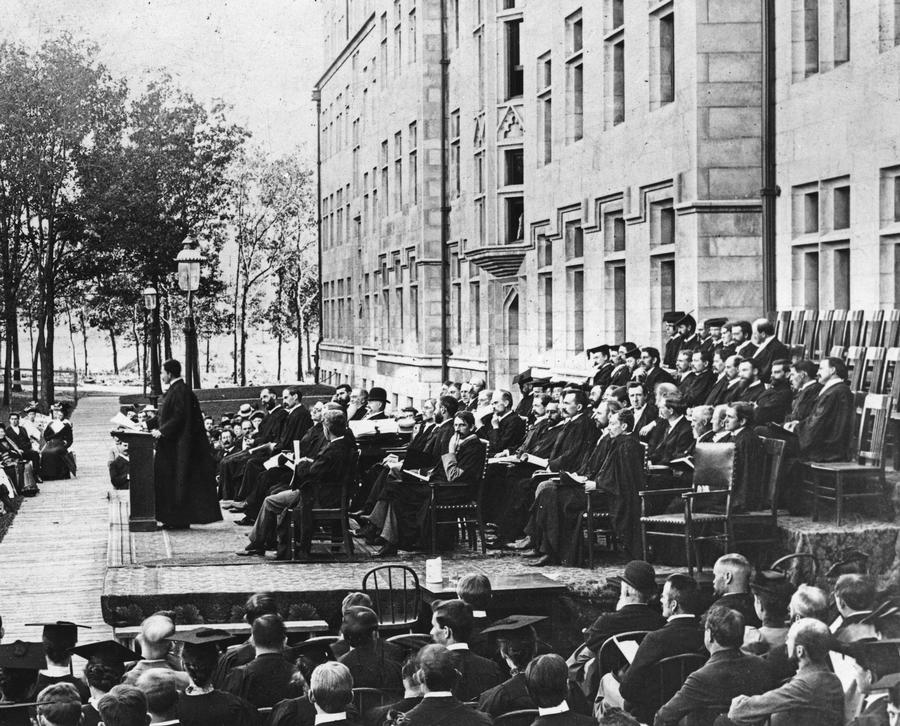
Albert A. Michelson, professor of physics and the first American Nobel laureate, delivers the second convocation address in front of Goodspeed and Gates-Blake Halls, with President William Rainey Harper, professors, and trustees in attendance, July 1, 1894.

The first University of Chicago was founded by a small group of Baptist educators and incorporated in 1857 after a land endowment from Senator Stephen A. Douglas and a fundraising campaign directed by the first president of the institution, John C. Burroughs. It closed in 1886 after decades of financial struggle, exacerbated by the Great Chicago Fire and the Panic of 1873, when the university's property was foreclosed on by its creditors. In 1890, its trustees elected to change the university's name to the "Old University of Chicago" so that the new university could go by the name of the city; a year later, the new university voted to recognize the alumni of the old as alumni of the new.

=== Early years ===
In 1890, the American Baptist Education Society (ABES) incorporated a new University of Chicago as a coeducational institution, using $400,000 donated to the ABES to supplement a $600,000 donation from Standard Oil co-founder John D. Rockefeller and land donated by Marshall Field. The Hyde Park campus’ construction was financed by donations from wealthy Chicagoans such as Silas B. Cobb, donor of the campus's first building, Cobb Lecture Hall; Charles L. Hutchinson, trustee, treasurer and donor of Hutchinson Commons; and Martin A. Ryerson, president of the board of trustees and donor of the Ryerson Physical Laboratory.

William Rainey Harper became the university's president on July 1, 1891, and classes first began on October 1, 1892. Harper offered large salaries to attract senior faculty, and in two years had a faculty of 120, including eight former university or college presidents. The undergraduate program was divided into two parts, with the first two years making up the Academic College, focusing on preparation for higher learning, and the last two years comprising the University College, with more advanced courses. The university operated on a quarter system, with 36 courses required to graduate. Harper brought the Baptist seminary, which had historical ties to the Old University of Chicago, to the university. This became the Divinity School in 1891, the first graduate professional school at the University of Chicago. Harper was a supporter of intercollegiate athletics, recruiting Amos Alonzo Stagg in 1892 to coach the football team and defending athletics from faculty opposition. In 1894, the university adopted maroon as its official color after initially selecting goldenrod. The Maroons became the university's nickname during the same year. During this period, the university founded the university extension, which offered evening courses for adults and correspondence courses, and the University of Chicago Press.

Rockefeller continued to provide significant contributions to the university after its founding. Harper's efforts to finance faculty research projects, expand the campus, and support university initiatives caused significant deficits covered by Rockefeller donations, with annual deficits between 1894 and 1903 averaging $215,000. In 1898, the board of trustees made a commitment to use new gifts to eliminate the deficit rather than to further expand programs, but structural deficits remained until after Harper's presidency.

=== 1906–1929 ===
After Harper's death in 1906, the board of trustees named Harry Pratt Judson, head of the Department of Political Science, acting president; in 1907, the appointment was made permanent. Judson initiated a policy of financial austerity, which renewed Rockefeller's confidence in the university and resulted in a series of large gifts to the endowment between 1906 and 1910, including a final gift of $10 million in 1910 that balanced the university's budget. In 1911, the university adopted a Latin motto of Crescat scientia; vita excolatur, which translates to "Let knowledge grow from more and more; and so be human life enriched." In 1912, Judson successfully encouraged the board to create a faculty pension fund.

During World War I, Judson, as well as faculty members such as Albion Small and Paul Shorey, published works supporting the war. On the other hand, student reaction was mixed, with most not participating in newly formed voluntary military training programs such as the ROTC. In 1918, the Student Army Training Corps program was announced by the War Department, which requisitioned the campus to be run by army officers for military training, but the November armistice soon ended the program. After the war, the Oriental Institute, now the Institute for the Study of Ancient Cultures, was founded by Egyptologist James Henry Breasted to support and interpret archaeological work in what was then called the Near East.

In 1923, senior scholar Ernest D. Burton succeeded Judson as president. Burton launched the first major fundraising campaign of the university to improve the research environment of the faculty as well as invest in residential halls for undergraduates, finding initial success despite faculty opposition to the perceived prioritization of undergraduate over graduate interests. Burton's sudden death in 1925 led to his replacement by physicist Max Mason, who ended the citywide fundraising drive early in favor of a quieter outreach among local businessmen. During Burton's term, and later Mason's, the Chicago Schools of thought began to emerge in the social sciences, with new organizations being established such as the Social Science Research Council in 1923.

=== 1929–1950 ===
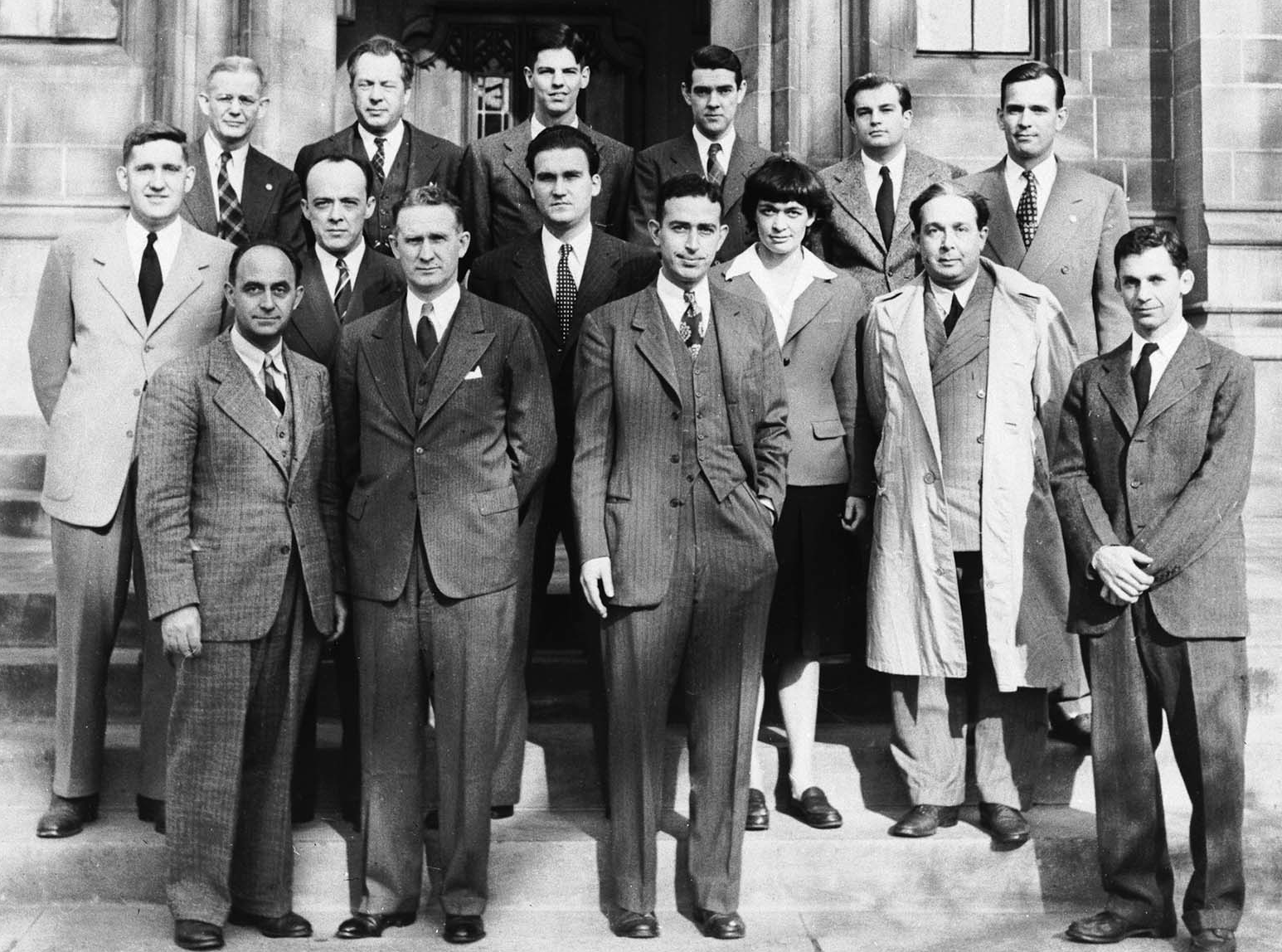
Some of the University of Chicago team who worked on the production of the world's first human-caused self-sustaining nuclear reaction, including Enrico Fermi in the front row and Leó Szilárd in the second

In 1929, the 30-year-old dean of Yale Law School, Robert Maynard Hutchins, became president. In 1930, Hutchins organized the graduate departments under four independent divisions and united the undergraduate colleges into one college. In 1931, alongside dean of the college Chauncey Boucher, Hutchins implemented a new two-year general education curriculum called the "New Plan", which formed the basis for the university's core curriculum. Later in the 1930s, Hutchins became unsatisfied with departmental influence on the undergraduate curriculum and pushed for further expansion to the general education curriculum. In 1940, Eliza Atkins Gleason became the first African American to earn a Ph.D. degree in Library Science in the country. In 1942, Hutchins transferred jurisdiction of the BA degree from the graduate divisions to the college, thus removing divisional leverage to shape the curriculum. The same year, the college reformed the BA degree with four years of prescribed general education.

Budget shortfalls caused by the Great Depression led to significant austerity measures and staffing cuts, though Hutchins protected the salaries of those who remained. In 1933, Hutchins proposed a plan to alleviate the financial situation by merging the university with Northwestern University, though it was ultimately abandoned. Financial woes contributed to the decision to end the university's football program in 1939. With substantial budget gaps remaining and support from the Rockefeller Foundation having dried up, a second major fundraising campaign was launched between 1939 and 1941 to celebrate the fiftieth anniversary of the university's founding with mixed results. Large deficits persisted after World War II, leaving future presidents to balance the budget.

During the war, the university recruited a number of refugee scientists from Europe, including Enrico Fermi, Rudolf Carnap, and James Franck. The university's Metallurgical Laboratory contributed to the Manhattan Project, with Enrico Fermi engineering the first self-sustaining nuclear chain reaction under the stands of Stagg Field, the university's football stadium, in 1942. In 1945, Hutchins announced the formation of the Institute for Nuclear Studies and the Institute for the Study of Metals in order to continue work done during the war. These were later renamed the Enrico Fermi Institute and the James Franck Institute, respectively. The university came under public scrutiny before and after the war for alleged communist influence, with university leadership called to testify before the Illinois General Assembly on the loyalty of its student body and faculty in 1935 and 1949.

=== 1951–1977 ===
In 1951, vice president of development Lawrence Kimpton succeeded Hutchins as chancellor, a position created in 1945 replacing the president as head of the university. The deficits left from Hutchins necessitated severe annual cuts in the operating budget, which was brought into balance by 1954. A fundraising campaign was launched the same year, which allowed for modest recovery, but the financial situation worsened after a decline in undergraduate enrollments. In 1957, to attract more students, Kimpton reduced the general education curriculum from four years to two years. Furthermore, the graduate divisional faculty was slowly merged with the previously independent college faculty via joint appointments. To address safety concerns driven by increasing crime and poverty in the Hyde Park neighborhood, the university became a major sponsor of a controversial urban renewal project for Hyde Park. Between 1954 and 1960, the university worked with the South East Chicago Commission and Mayor Richard J. Daley to clear approximately 925 acres of land, disproportionately affecting Black, low-income residents.

Front page of the Chicago Maroon breaking the news of the university's segregationist off-campus rental policies

In 1961, Caltech professor George Beadle was elected chancellor, resuming the title of president later that year. Beadle's tenure saw large investments in faculty and campus expansion to rebuild the university after Kimpton's austerity, funded in large part by a $25 million grant provided by the Ford Foundation and an accompanying fundraising campaign. The university experienced its share of student unrest during this time, beginning in 1962 when then-freshman Bernie Sanders helped lead a 15-day sit-in at the college's administration building in a protest over the university's segregationist off-campus rental policies. After continued turmoil, a university committee in 1967 issued what became known as the Kalven Report. The report, a two-page statement of the university's policy in "social and political action," declared that "To perform its mission in the society, a university must sustain an extraordinary environment of freedom of inquiry and maintain an independence from political fashions, passions, and pressures."

In 1964, the undergraduate college was reorganized into five collegiate divisions, four paralleling the four graduate divisions and one interdisciplinary New Collegiate Division.

In 1967, provost Edward Levi became president. His tenure saw a number of sit-ins at the administrative building: in 1962, over the university's segregationist off-campus rental policies; in 1966 and 1967, over the university providing the class rank of students who sought deferments to draft boards; and in 1969, over the sociology's department decision not to rehire the openly Marxist assistant professor Marlene Dixon. In 1967, a university committee issued the Kalven Report, maintaining the university's duty to uphold academic freedom and remain non-partisan. The report has since been cited in university debates over divesting from South Africa and Sudan, as well as in the Chicago Principles on free speech, which a number of other universities have since adopted. By the 1970s, facing the end of the Ford Foundation's support, a reduction in enrollment due to insufficient student housing, flagging federal funding, and broader economic stagflation, the university faced more fiscal austerity. In 1975, provost John Wilson was appointed president, balancing the budget once more through cuts.

=== 1978–present ===
In 1978, history scholar and provost of Yale, Hanna Holborn Gray, became president of the university. She was the first woman in the United States to be appointed to a full-term presidency of a major research university. Still facing budgetary issues, Gray modernized the university's financial systems, increased the size and tuition of the undergraduate college, and paired campus expansion and renovation with administrative austerity. While budgetary equilibrium was reached through the mid-1980s, acute deficits soon re-emerged, exacerbated by the 1990-1992 recession. Gray also oversaw the implementation of a unified 21 course core curriculum across all collegiate divisions in 1985 and invested in student life through new food services, school festivals, and the reintroduction of varsity athletics.

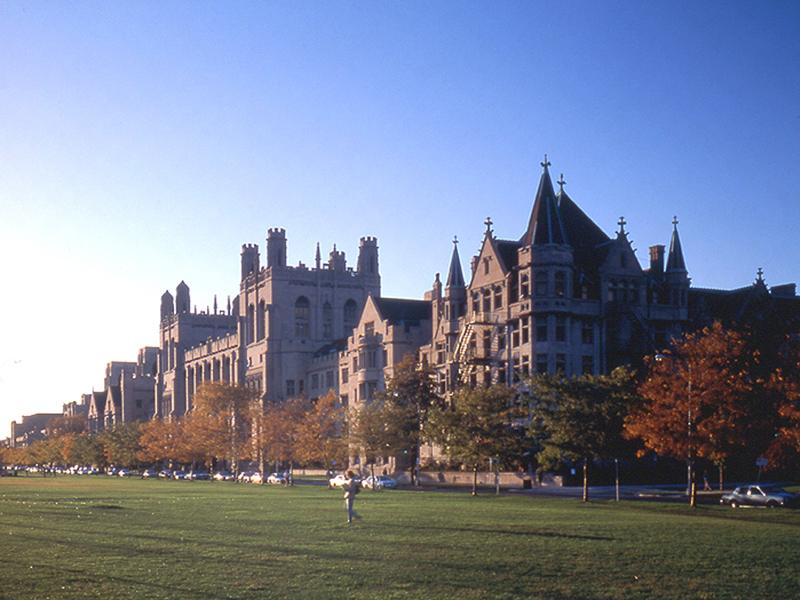
View from the Midway Plaisance

In 1992, economist Hugo F. Sonnenschein became president, facing projected deficits of $23 million for the 1995-96 budget and poor endowment growth. The raising of $676 million in a fundraising campaign for the university's centennial throughout the early 1990s helped alleviate these problems. In 1996, Sonnenschein proposed the expansion of the undergraduate college by 1,000 students to raise tuition revenue, and in 1997, backed a plan to reduce the number of required course in the core curriculum from 21 to 15–18 (depending on how a student met the language requirement). After intense debate, with the university becoming the focal point of a national debate on education, both reforms were approved. In 2000, Cornell University provost Don Michael Randel became the twelfth president of the university. His tenure was marked by increased support for the arts on campus, stronger outreach to local civic and business leaders, investments in major campus facilities, and the launch of a new $2 billion capital campaign.

In 2006, mathematician Robert J. Zimmer was appointed president, receiving board approval to take on large amounts of debt at low interest rates after the 2008 recession in order to finance a number of major projects. These included new buildings and pavilions, such as Mansueto Library in 2011, a reading room and book storage facility; the Logan Center for the Arts in 2012; the Keller Center in 2019, home of the Harris School of Public Policy; and Woodlawn Residential Commons in 2020, which houses 1,298 students. Between 2008 and 2022, the university partnered with the city and outside businesses to launch three interventions along 53rd Street in an attempt to improve the neighborhood's economic condition. As part of an effort to invest in its professional schools, the university formed the Becker Friedman Institute in 2011, acquired the Marine Biological Laboratory in 2013, repurposed the Crerar Library as the headquarters of the Department of Computer Science in 2018, and established the Pritzker School of Molecular Engineering in 2019. The university also expanded its presence abroad, opening campuses in Hong Kong in 2018, in London in 2022, and in Paris in 2024, alongside centers in Beijing in 2010 and in Delhi in 2014. Despite a $5.4 billion fundraising campaign started in 2014, university debt has exceeded initial planning expectations, reaching $6.3 billion in 2025.

In 2021, Zimmer was succeeded by chemist Paul Alivisatos, then-provost of the University of California, Berkeley. In 2024, university students set up an encampment on the university's main quad as a part of the nationwide movement in support of Palestine at institutions of higher learning across the country. The encampment was later cleared by University of Chicago Police Department officers.

== Campus ==
=== Main campus ===
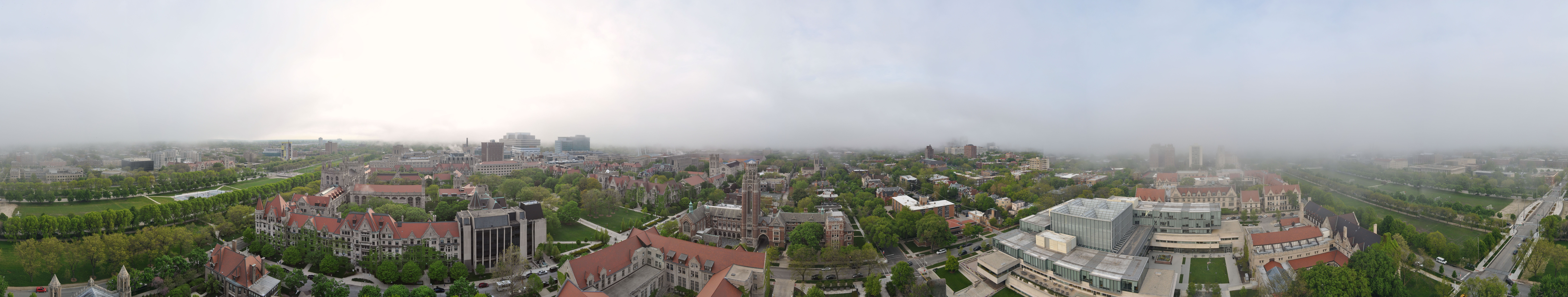
The campus of the University of Chicago, from the top of Rockefeller Chapel. The Main Quadrangles can be seen on the left (west), the Institute for the Study of Ancient Cultures and the Becker Friedman Institute for Research in Economics can be seen in the center (north) and the Booth School of Business and Laboratory Schools can be seen on the right (east), as the panoramic is bounded on both sides by the Midway Plaisance (south).

The main campus of the University of Chicago consists of 217 acres (87.8 ha) in the Chicago neighborhoods of Hyde Park and Woodlawn, approximately eight miles (13 km) south of downtown Chicago. The northern and southern portions of campus are separated by the Midway Plaisance, a large, linear park created for the 1893 World's Columbian Exposition. In 2011, Travel+Leisure listed the university as one of the most beautiful college campuses in the United States.

Aerial shots from the University of Chicago campus

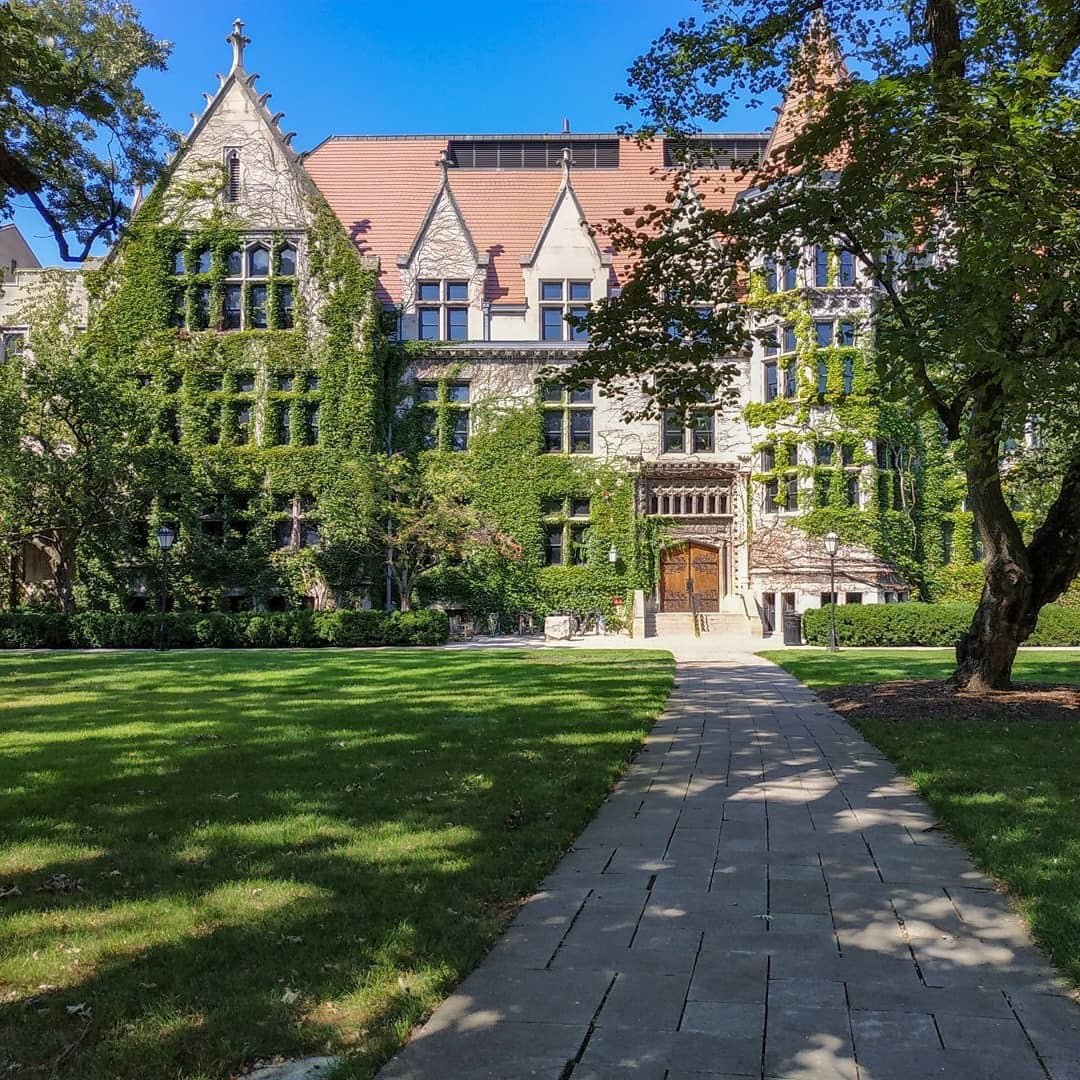
View of university building from the Harper Quadrangle

The first buildings of the campus, which make up what are now known as the Main Quadrangles, were part of a master plan conceived by two University of Chicago trustees and plotted by Chicago architect Henry Ives Cobb. The Main Quadrangles consist of six quadrangles, each surrounded by buildings, bordering one larger quadrangle. The buildings of the Main Quadrangles were designed by Cobb, Shepley, Rutan and Coolidge, Holabird & Roche, and other architectural firms in a mixture of the Victorian Gothic and Collegiate Gothic styles, patterned on the colleges of the University of Oxford. Mitchell Tower, for example, is modeled after Oxford's Magdalen Tower, and the university Commons, Hutchinson Hall, replicates Christ Church Hall. In celebration of the 2018 Illinois Bicentennial, the University of Chicago Quadrangles were selected as one of the Illinois 200 Great Places by the American Institute of Architects Illinois component.

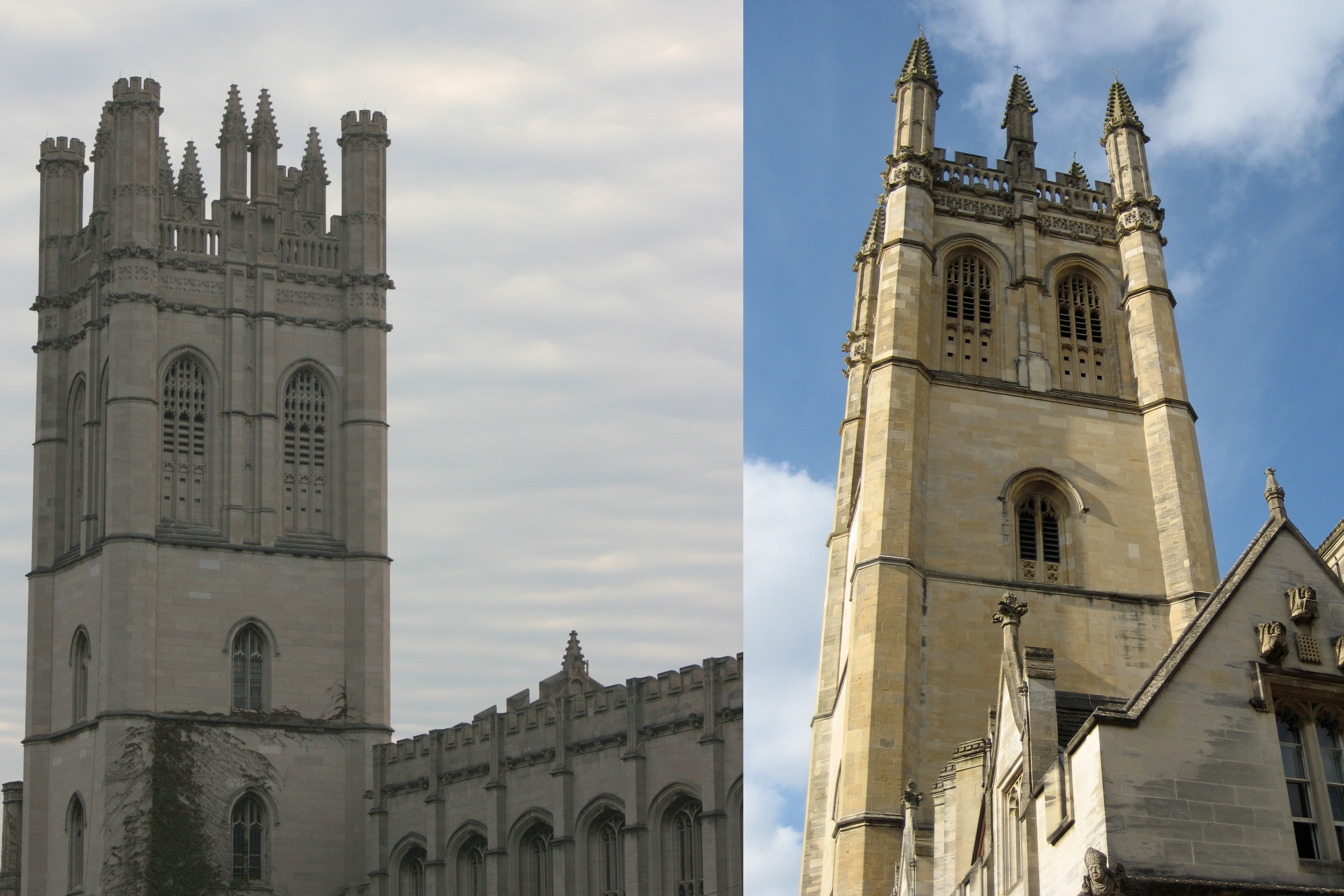
Many older buildings of the University of Chicago employ Collegiate Gothic architecture like that of the University of Oxford. For example, Chicago's Mitchell Tower (left) was modeled after Oxford's Magdalen Tower (right).

After the 1940s, the campus's Gothic style began to give way to modern styles. In 1955, Eero Saarinen was contracted to develop a second master plan, which led to the construction of buildings both north and south of the Midway, including the Laird Bell Law Quadrangle (a complex designed by Saarinen); a series of arts buildings; Edith Abbott Hall, designed by Ludwig Mies van der Rohe; the Keller Center, which is home of the Harris School of Public Policy and was designed by Edward Durrell Stone; and the Regenstein Library, the largest building on campus, a brutalist structure designed by Walter Netsch. Another master plan, designed in 1999 and updated in 2004, produced the Gerald Ratner Athletics Center (2003), the Max Palevsky Residential Commons (2001), South Campus Residence Hall and dining commons (2009), a new children's hospital, and other construction, expansions, and restorations. In 2011, the university completed the glass dome-shaped Joe and Rika Mansueto Library, which provides a grand reading room for the university library and prevents the need for an off-campus book depository.

The site of Chicago Pile-1 is a National Historic Landmark and is marked by the Henry Moore sculpture Nuclear Energy. Robie House, a Frank Lloyd Wright building acquired by the university in 1963, is a UNESCO World Heritage Site, as well as a National Historic Landmark, as is room 405 of the George Herbert Jones Laboratory, where Glenn T. Seaborg and his team were the first to isolate plutonium. Hitchcock Hall, an undergraduate dormitory, is on the National Register of Historic Places.

Adjacent to the campus in Jackson Park is the home of the Obama Presidential Center, the Presidential Library for the 44th president of the United States that was officially opened in 2026. The Obamas settled in the university's Hyde Park neighborhood, where they raised their children and where Barack Obama began his political career. Michelle Obama served as an administrator at the university and founded the university's Community Service Center.

Campus of the University of Chicago

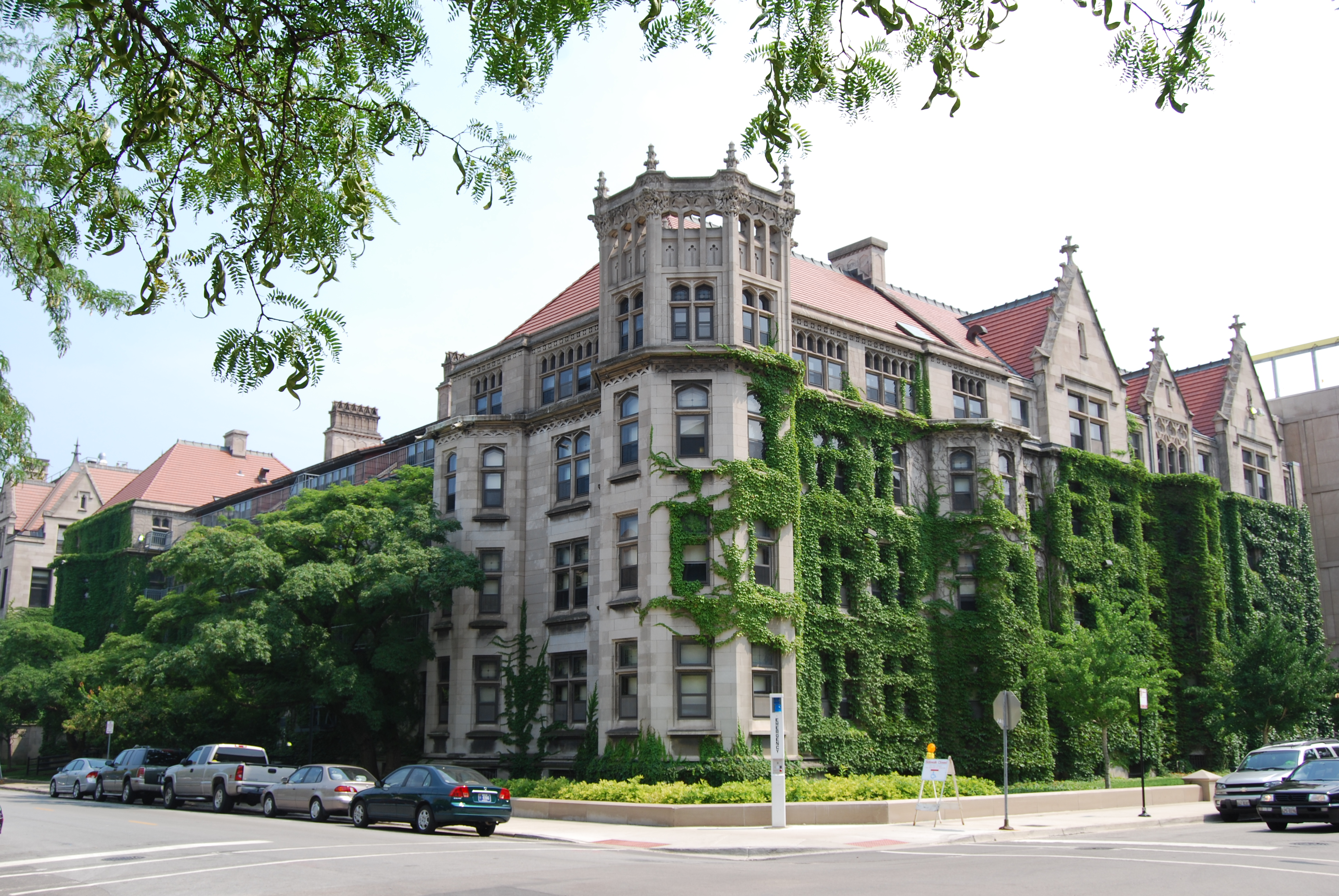
Snell-Hitchcock, an undergraduate dormitory constructed in the early 20th century, is part of the Main Quadrangles.

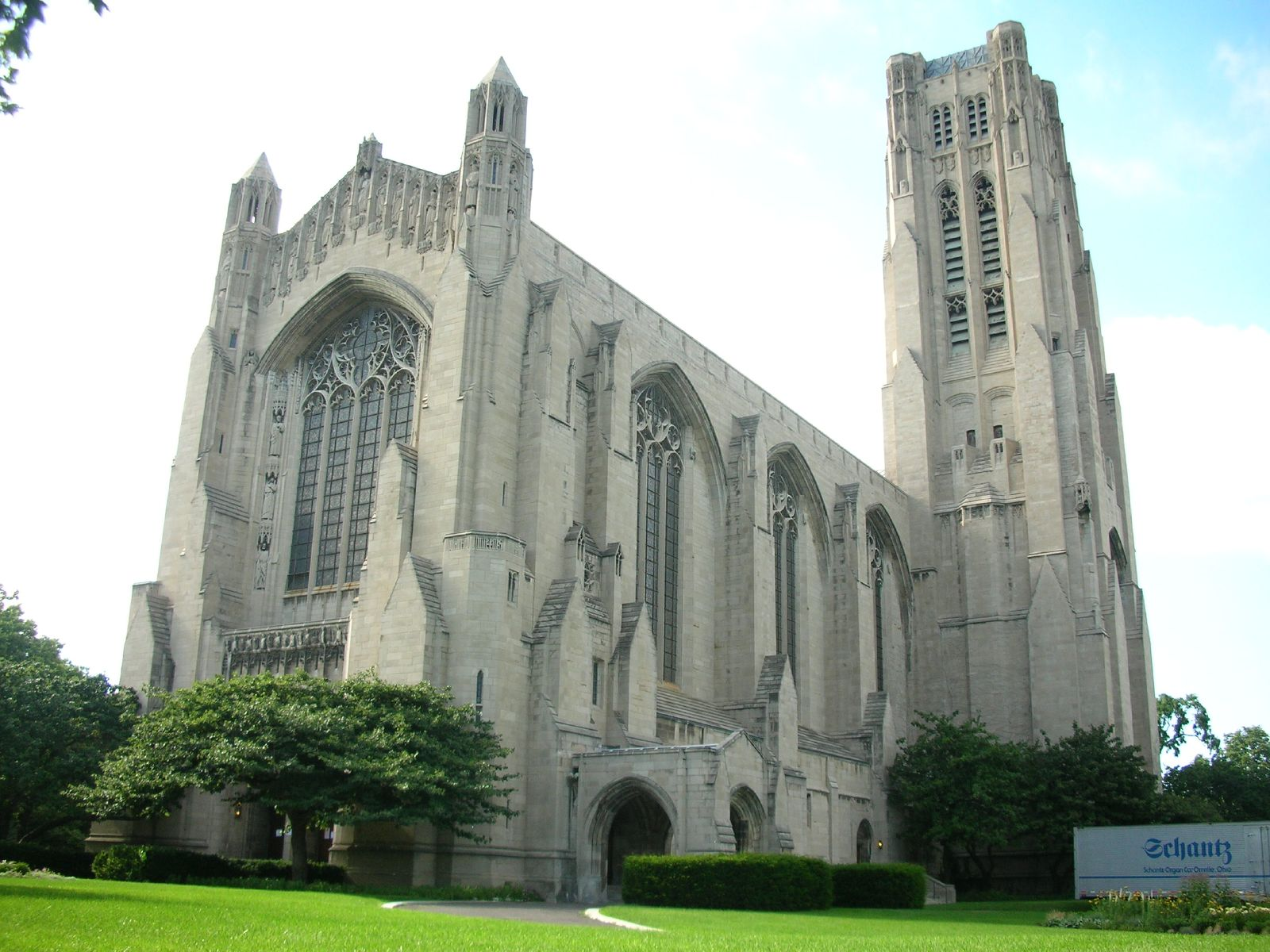
Rockefeller Chapel, constructed in 1928, was designed by Bertram Goodhue in the neo-Gothic style.

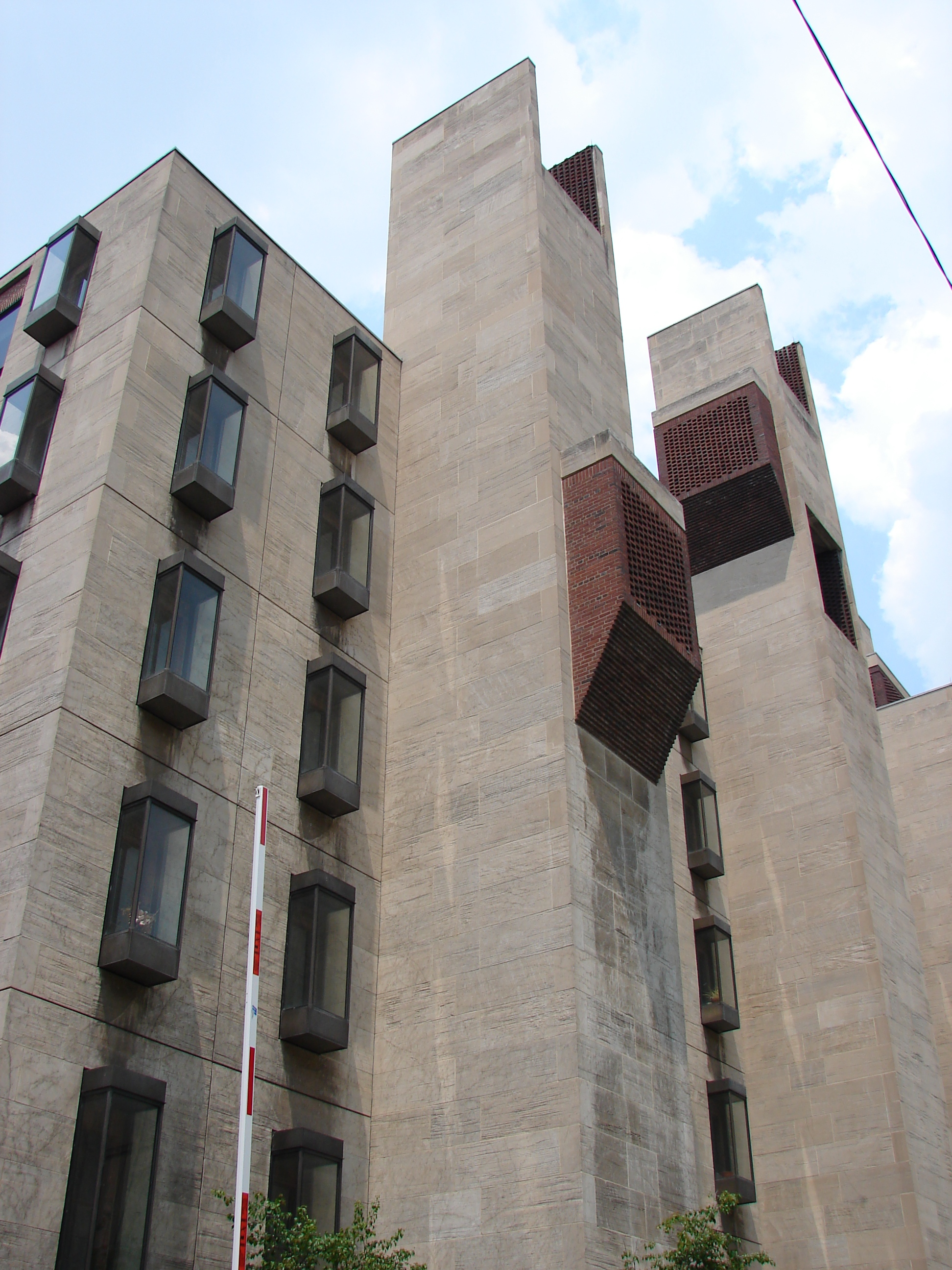
The Henry Hinds Laboratory for Geophysical Sciences was built in 1969.

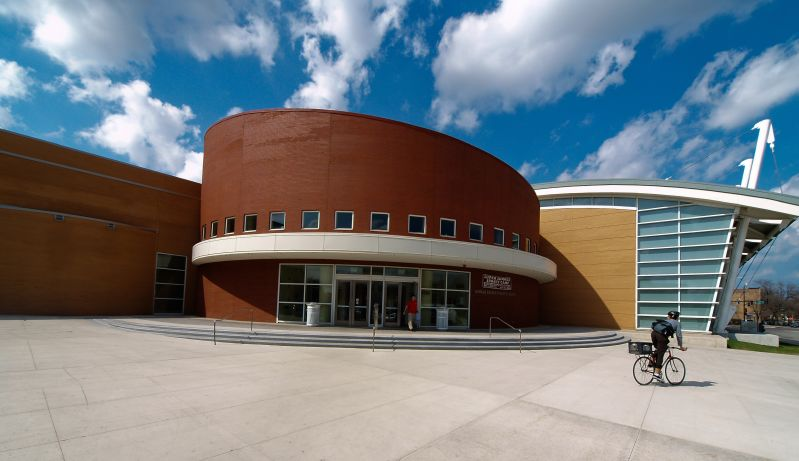
The Gerald Ratner Athletics Center, opened in 2003 and designed by Cesar Pelli, houses the volleyball, wrestling, swimming, and basketball teams.

==== Transportation ====
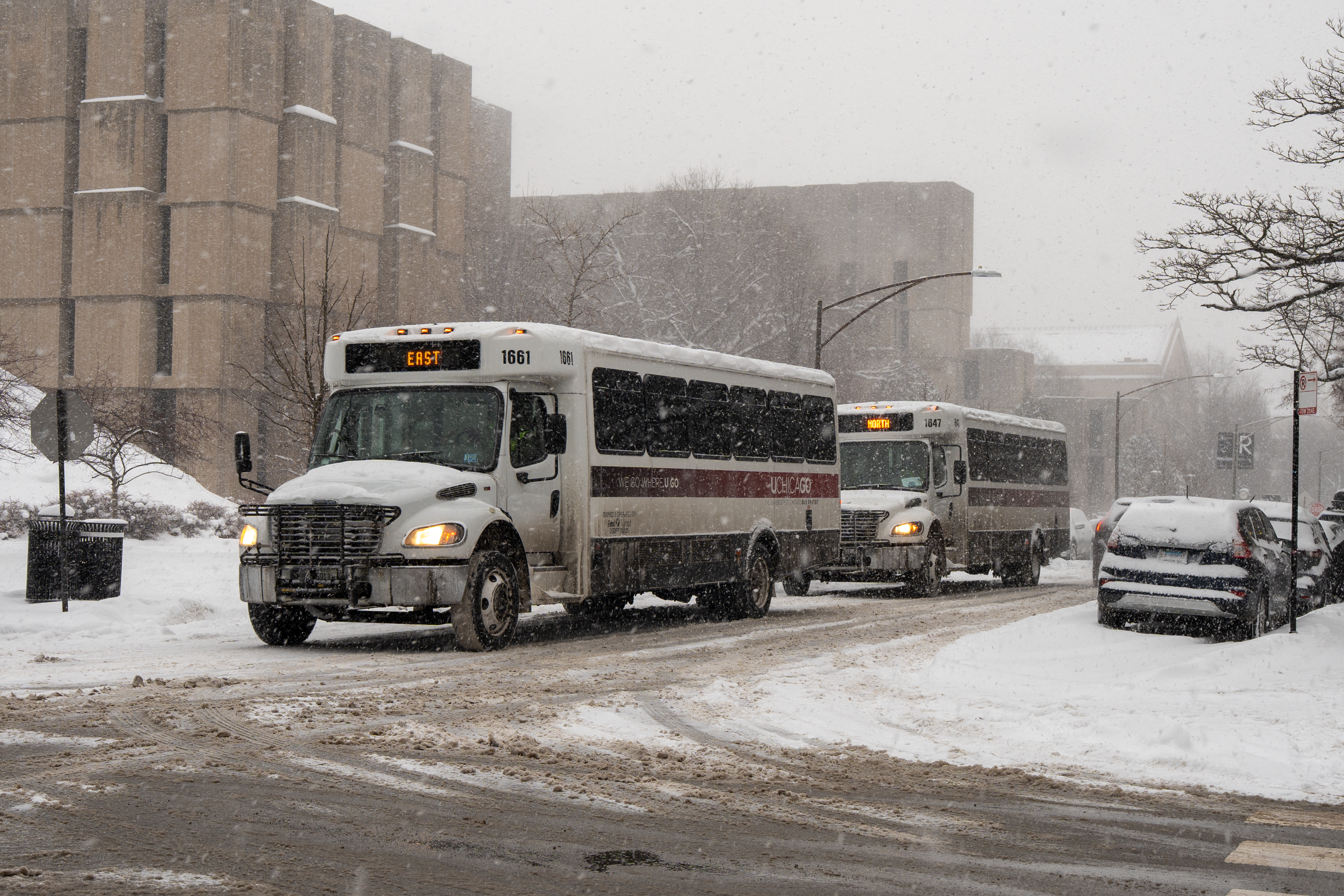
Two University of Chicago shuttle buses on 57th Street outside Regenstein Library

The Hyde Park campus is served by the CTA Red Line and Green Line, as well as by the Metra Electric District, all of which provide access to downtown Chicago. The South Shore Line provides access to Hegeswich and Northwest Indiana via the Lakeshore Corridor. The campus is also served by a network of CTA bus routes.

The university shuttle program includes daytime and nighttime routes, most of which operate within Hyde Park. In 2022, the university added a Downtown Campus Connector to its shuttle program, which connects the main Hyde Park campus to the Gleacher Center and downtown UChicago Medicine clinics.

In 2024, the university introduced a Via ride-sharing program ahead of the 2024–2025 school year, which provides unlimited free rides on campus in shared vans.

==== Safety ====
In November 2021, a university graduate was robbed and fatally shot on a sidewalk in a residential area in Hyde Park near campus; a total of three University of Chicago students were killed by gunfire incidents in 2021. These incidents prompted student protests and an open letter to university leadership signed by more than 300 faculty members. In response, the university introduced measures including increased foot and vehicular patrols near campus, expanded coordination between the university police department and the Chicago Police Department, and greater use of security cameras and license plate readers. The university continues to maintain one of the largest private police forces in the country.

=== Satellite academic facilities ===
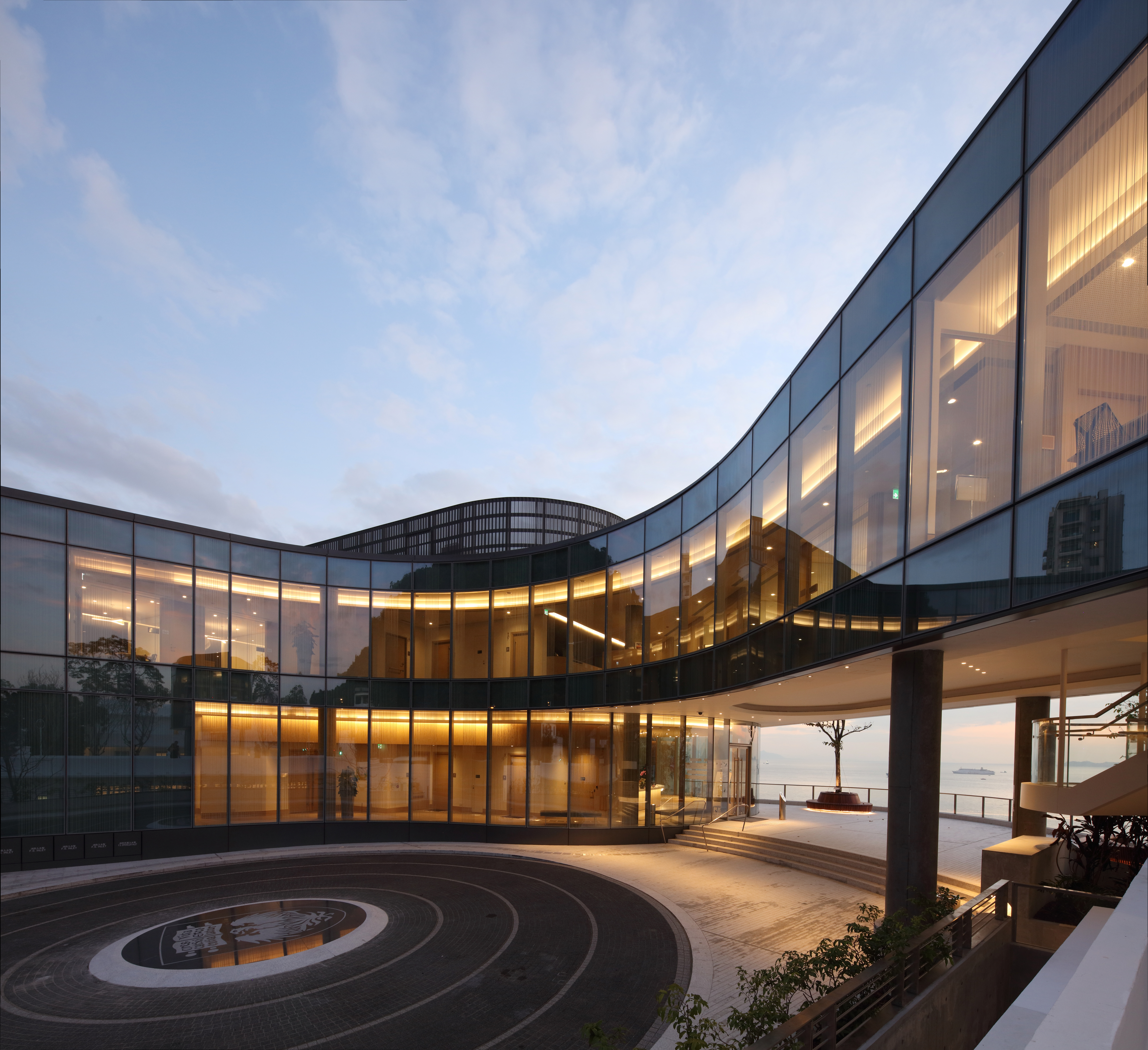
The University of Chicago Francis and Rose Yuen Campus, located at Mount Davis, Hong Kong

The university also maintains facilities apart from its main campus. The university's Booth School of Business maintains academic facilities in Hong Kong, London, and downtown Chicago. The Center in Paris, located on the left bank of the Seine in Paris, hosts various undergraduate and graduate study programs. The university also maintains the Chicago House, based in Luxor, Egypt, which serves as the Egyptian headquarters for the Institute for the Study of Ancient Cultures. In fall 2010, the university opened a center in Beijing, near Renmin University's campus in Haidian District. The most recent additions are a center in New Delhi, India, which opened in 2014, and a center in Hong Kong which opened in 2018. In 2024, the university opened the John W. Boyer Center in Paris, designed by architectural firm Studio Gang and nearly tripling the size of the Center in Paris which had opened in 2003.

== Academics ==
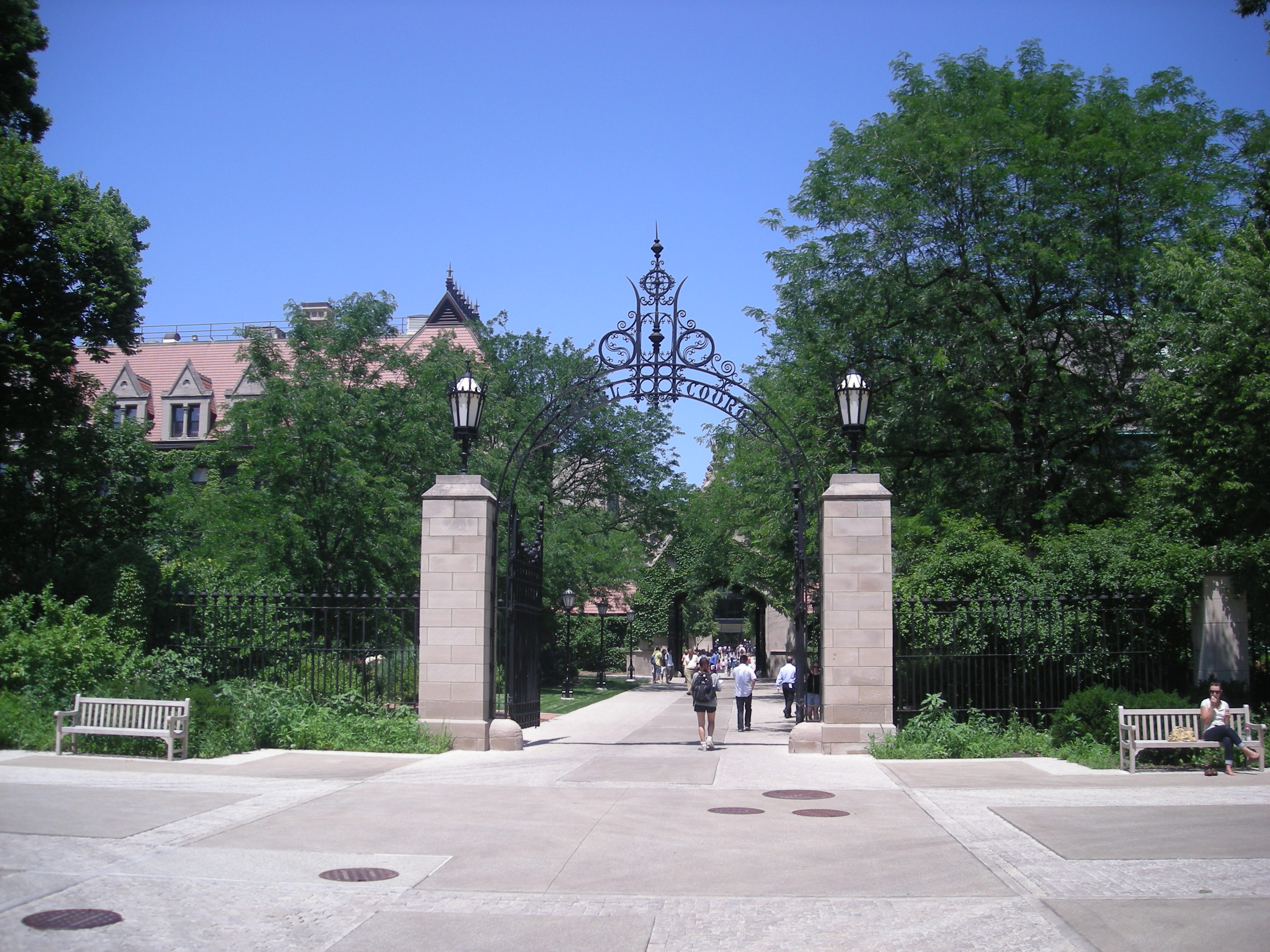
The University of Chicago Main Quadrangles, looking north

The academic bodies of the University of Chicago consist of the college, four divisions of graduate research, seven professional schools, and the Graham School of Continuing Liberal and Professional Studies. The university also contains a library system, the University of Chicago Press, and the University of Chicago Medical Center, and oversees several laboratories, including the Fermi National Accelerator Laboratory (Fermilab), the Argonne National Laboratory, and the Marine Biological Laboratory. The university is accredited by the Higher Learning Commission. It is a member of the National Association of Independent Colleges and Universities and the Universities Research Association.

The university runs on a quarter system in which the academic year is divided into four terms: Summer (June–August), Autumn (September–December), Winter (January–March), and Spring (March–June). Full-time undergraduate students take three to four courses every quarter for approximately ten weeks before their quarterly academic breaks. The school year typically begins in late September and ends in early June.

=== Undergraduate college ===
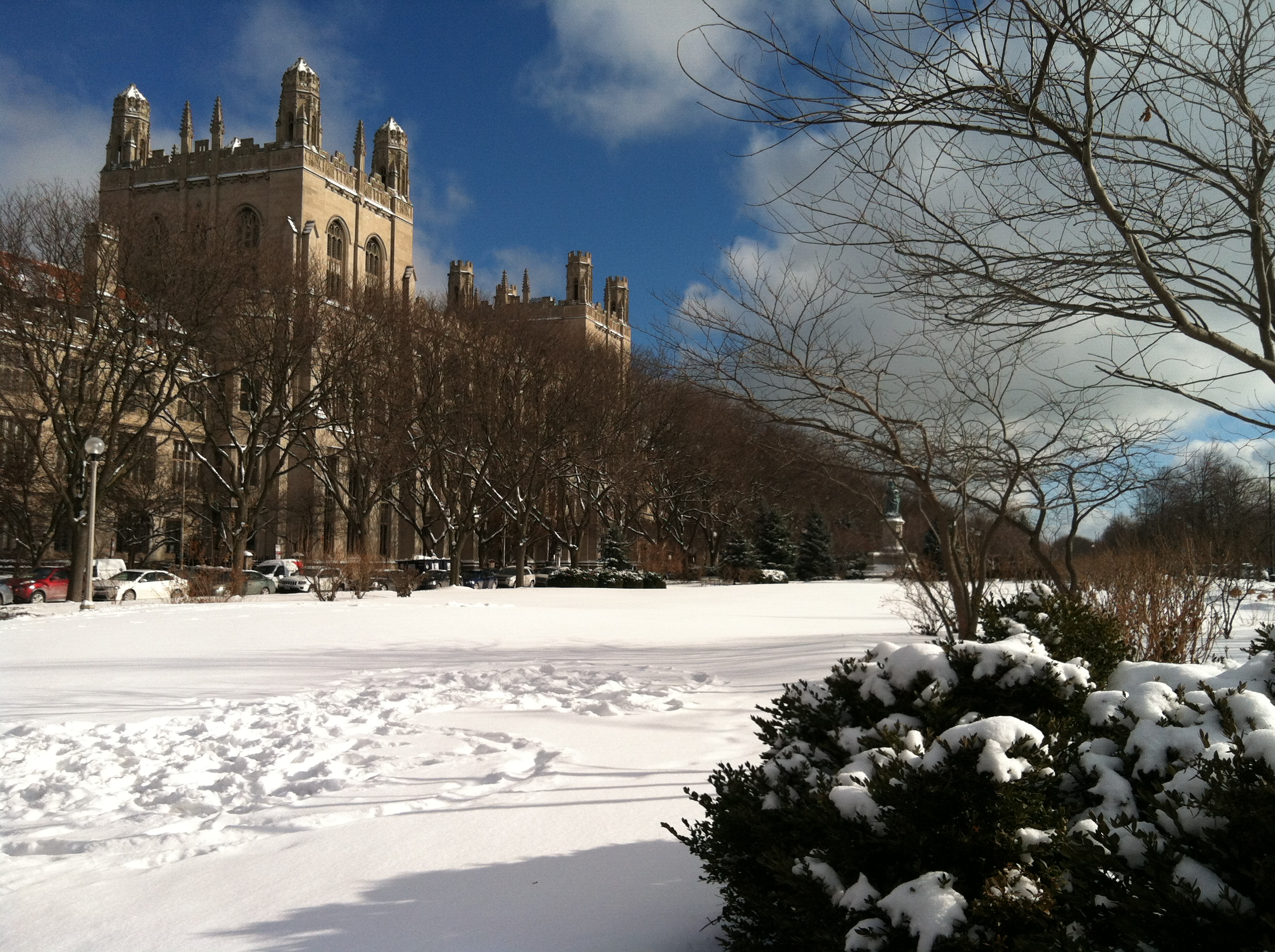
Harper Memorial Library was dedicated in 1912, and its architecture takes inspiration from various colleges in England.

The College of the University of Chicago grants Bachelor of Arts and Bachelor of Science degrees in 51 undergraduate majors and 33 minors. The college's academics are divided into five divisions: the Biological Sciences Collegiate Division, the Physical Sciences Collegiate Division, the Social Sciences Collegiate Division, the Humanities Collegiate Division, and the New Collegiate Division. Each division, except for the interdisciplinary New Collegiate Division, is affiliated with the corresponding graduate division of the university.

The college introduced a now-widespread model of the liberal arts undergraduate program which featured the Socratic method in undergraduate contexts, the Great Books program, and the core curriculum. Since the 1999–2000 school year, 15 courses across seven subjects and demonstrated proficiency in a foreign language are required under the core curriculum.

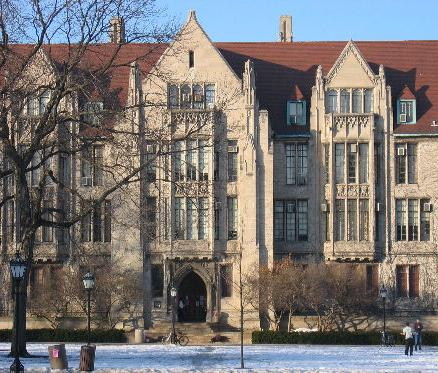
Eckhart Hall houses the university's math department.

=== Graduate research divisions ===
The university's academic departments, committees, and institutes are organized into four graduate research divisions: the Arts & Humanities Division, the Biological Sciences Division, the Physical Sciences Division, and the Social Sciences Division.

In the autumn quarter of 2022, the university enrolled 10,546 graduate students on degree-seeking courses: 569 in the Biological Sciences Division, 612 in the Humanities Division, 2,103 in the Physical Sciences Division, 972 in the Social Sciences Division, and 6,290 in the professional schools (including the Graham School). The university is home to several committees for interdisciplinary scholarship, including the Committee on Social Thought.

==== Research ====
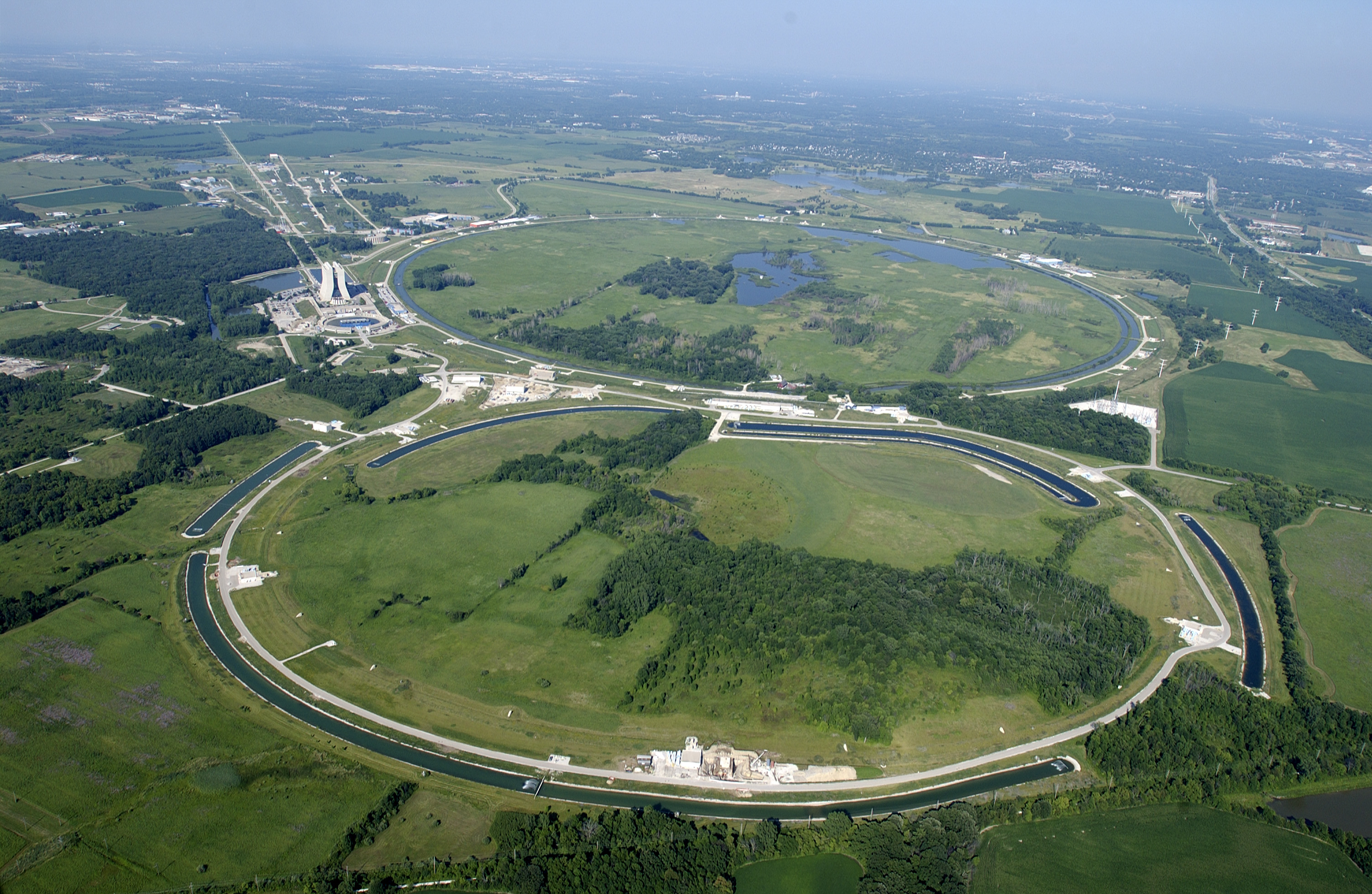
Aerial view of Fermilab, a science research laboratory co-managed by the University of Chicago

According to the National Science Foundation, the University of Chicago spent $423.9 million on research and development in 2018, ranking it 60th in the nation. It is classified among "R1: Doctoral Universities – Very high research activity". It is a founding member of the Association of American Universities, and was a member of the Committee on Institutional Cooperation between 1946 and 2016, when the group's name was changed to the Big Ten Academic Alliance. The University of Chicago is not a member of the rebranded consortium, but continues to be a collaborator.

The university operates more than 140 research centers and institutes on campus. Among these are the Institute for the Study of Ancient Cultures, West Asia & North Africa—a museum and research center for Near Eastern studies owned and operated by the university—and a number of National Resource Centers, including the Center for Middle Eastern Studies. Chicago also operates or is affiliated with several research institutions apart from the university proper. The university manages the Argonne National Laboratory, part of the United States Department of Energy's national laboratory system, and co-manages the Fermi National Accelerator Laboratory (Fermilab), a nearby particle physics laboratory. It was also part of the Astrophysical Research Consortium that constructed the Apache Point Observatory in Sunspot, New Mexico. Faculty and students at the adjacent Toyota Technological Institute at Chicago collaborate with the university. In 2013, the university formed an affiliation with the formerly independent Marine Biological Laboratory in Woods Hole, Mass. The National Opinion Research Center maintains an office at the Hyde Park campus and is affiliated with multiple academic centers and institutes.

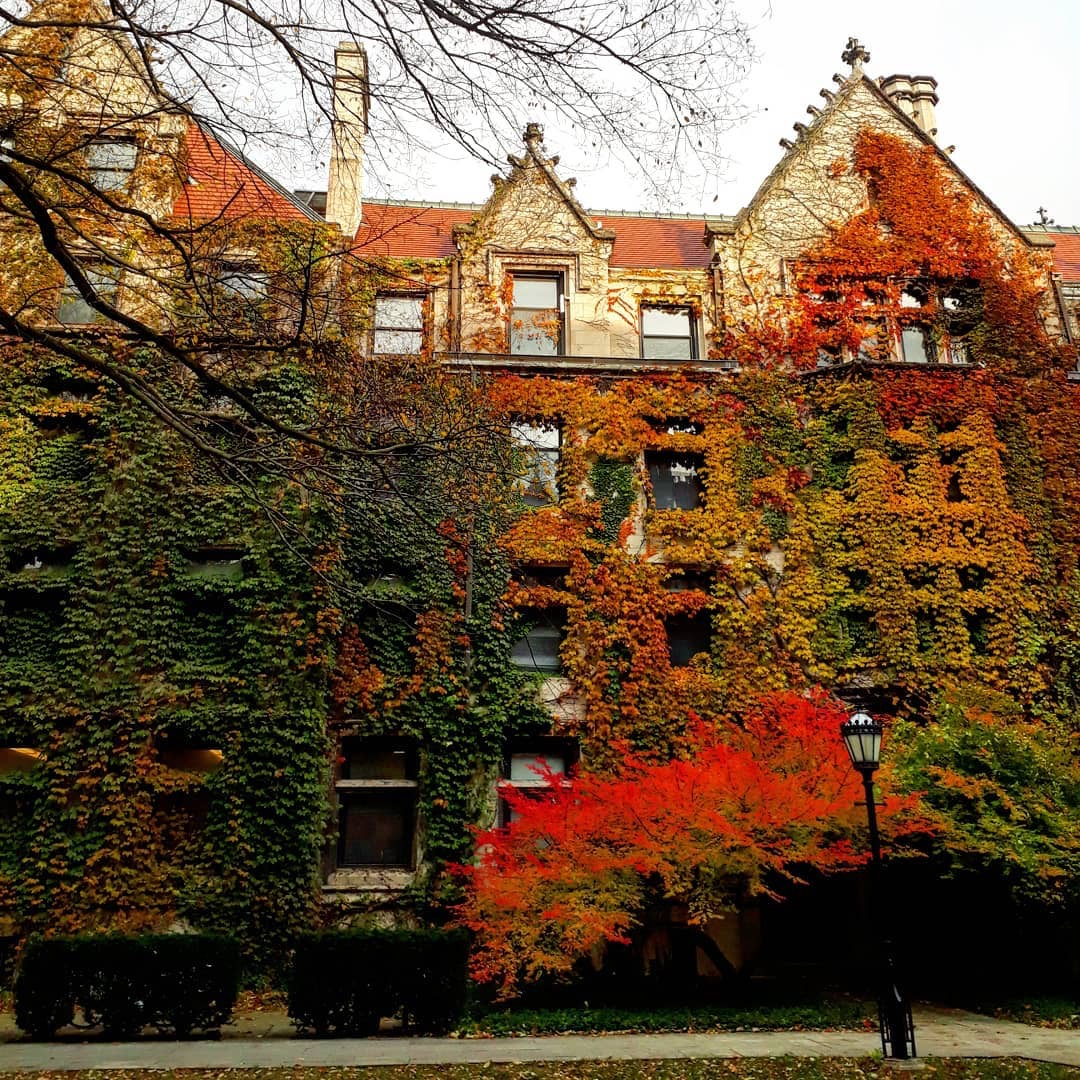
University of Chicago building during fall

The University of Chicago has been the site of various experiments and academic movements. The university has played a role in shaping ideas about the free market and is the namesake of the Chicago school of economics, the school of economic thought supported by Milton Friedman and other economists. The university's sociology department was the first independent sociology department in the United States and gave birth to the Chicago school of sociology. The Chicago school of mathematical analysis is a school of thought in mathematics that emphasizes the applications of Fourier analysis to the study of partial differential equations and was founded at the University of Chicago in the 1950s. The university was the site of the Chicago Pile-1 (the first controlled, self-sustaining human-made nuclear chain reaction, part of the Manhattan Project), of Robert Millikan's oil-drop experiment that calculated the charge of the electron, and of the development of radiocarbon dating by Willard F. Libby in 1946. The chemical experiment that tested how life originated on early Earth, the Miller–Urey experiment, was also conducted at the university. REM sleep was discovered at the university in 1953 by Nathaniel Kleitman and Eugene Aserinsky.

The University of Chicago Department of Astronomy and Astrophysics operated the Yerkes Observatory in Williams Bay, Wisconsin from 1897 until 2018, where the largest operating refracting telescope in the world and other telescopes are located.

=== Professional schools ===
The university contains seven professional schools, as well as the Graham School of Continuing Liberal and Professional Studies.

- The University of Chicago Divinity School was the first professional school at the University of Chicago, chartered in 1865 and incorporated into the university in 1890. It offers four graduate degree programs as well as undergraduate course offerings. It has been accredited by the Association of Theological Schools in the United States and Canada since 1938.
- The Booth School of Business was founded in 1898 as the College of Commerce and Politics and received business school accreditation in 1916. In 2008, the then-called Graduate School of Business was renamed following a $300 million donation from alumnus David Booth. It was ranked fourth out of 133 American business schools by U.S. News in 2025.
- The University of Chicago Law School was established in 1902, twelve years after the founding of the university. It has been accredited by the American Bar Association since 1923 and was ranked third out of 195 American law schools by U.S. News in 2025.
- The Crown Family School of Social Work, Policy, and Practice was first established in 1908 as the Chicago School of Civics and Philanthropy and received its first dean, Edith Abbott, who became the first female dean of any graduate school in the United States in 1924. It was renamed in 2021 in recognition of a $75 million donation from James and Paula Crown and the Crown family.
- The Pritzker School of Medicine matriculated its first class of medical students in 1927 and was renamed to the Pritzker School of Medicine in 1968 in recognition of support from the Pritzker family. It has been accredited by the Liaison Committee on Medical Education since 1942. In 2023, the school declined to continue submitting data to U.S. News to help the publication rank the institution, joining medical schools including those at Harvard, Stanford, and Columbia in doing so.
- The Harris School of Public Policy was established in 1988 as the Graduate School of Public Policy Studies. In 1990, it was renamed in recognition of Irving Harris' financial support of the program during its inception. The school offers six graduate degree programs as well as joint degree and non-degree programs.
- The Pritzker School of Molecular Engineering was founded in 2019 following an expansion of the Institute of Molecular Engineering, which was established in 2011. The Pritzker Foundation provided a $75 million donation to help establish the school, which occupies the William Eckhardt Research Center.
- The Graham School of Continuing Liberal and Professional Studies, originally known as the university-Extension program, was established in 1892. The school offers various non-degree courses and certificates as well as degree programs. In 1997, it was renamed to the William B. and Catherine V. Graham School of General Studies in honor of a $10 million donation from William and Catherine Graham made in the same year.

Until 1989, the University of Chicago Graduate Library School was the graduate-level librarianship school at the University of Chicago. It was established in 1928 to develop a program for the graduate education of librarians with a focus on research. Housed for a time in the Joseph Regenstein Library, the Graduate Library School closed in 1989 when the University of Chicago decided to promote information studies instead of professional education.

=== Associated institutions ===
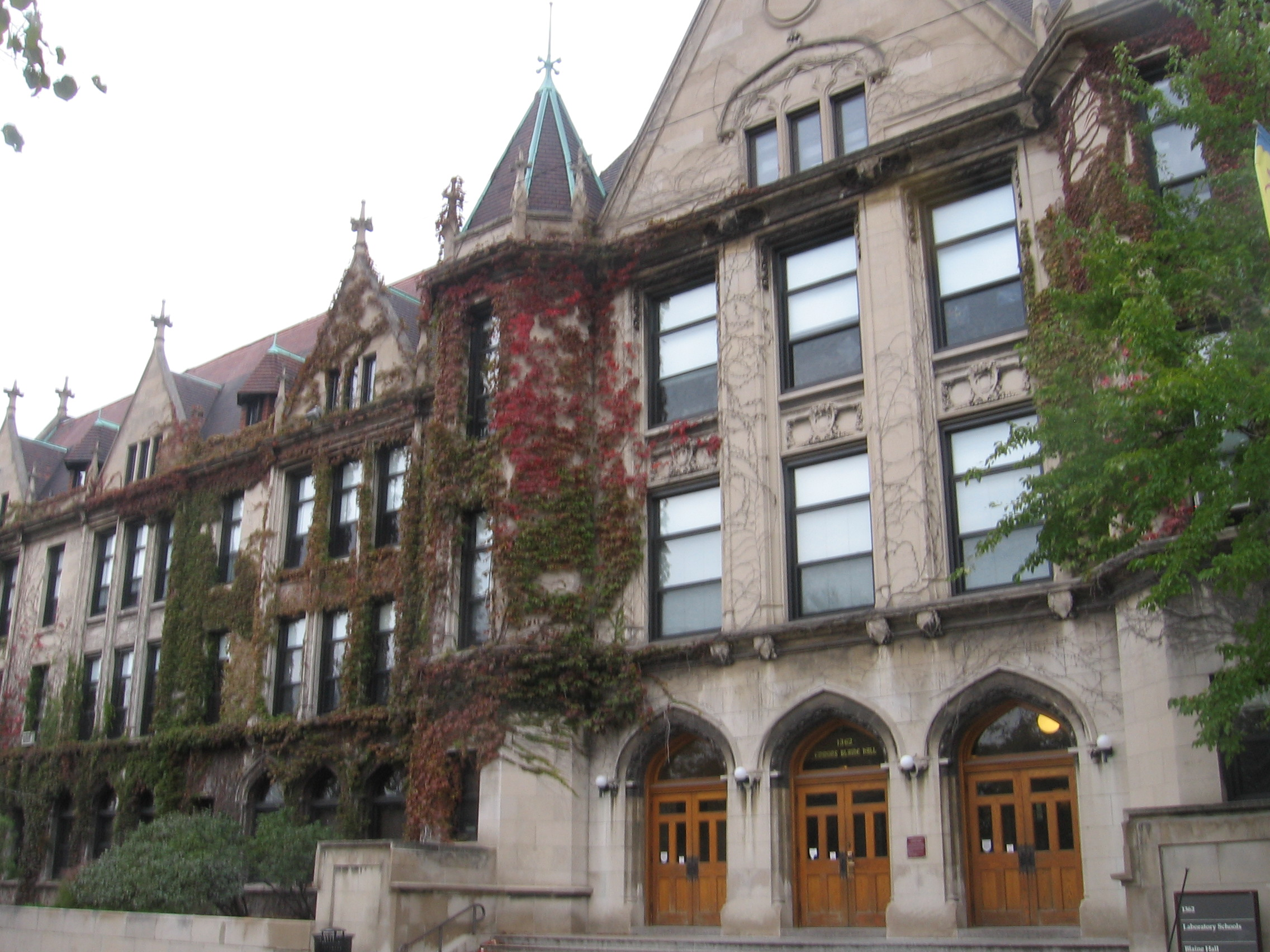
The University of Chicago Laboratory Schools, a private day school run by the university

The university runs a number of academic institutions and programs apart from its undergraduate and postgraduate schools. It operates the University of Chicago Laboratory Schools (a private day school for K-12 students and day care), and a public charter school with three campuses on the South Side of Chicago administered by the university's Urban Education Institute. In addition, the Hyde Park Day School, a school for students with learning disabilities, and the Sonia Shankman Orthogenic School, a residential treatment program for those with behavioral and emotional problems, maintains a location on the University of Chicago campus. Since 1983, the University of Chicago has maintained the University of Chicago School Mathematics Project, a mathematics program used in urban primary and secondary schools. The university runs a program called the Council on Advanced Studies, which administers interdisciplinary workshops to provide a forum for graduate students, faculty, and visiting scholars to present scholarly work in progress. The university also operates the University of Chicago Press, the largest university press in North America.

=== Library system ===
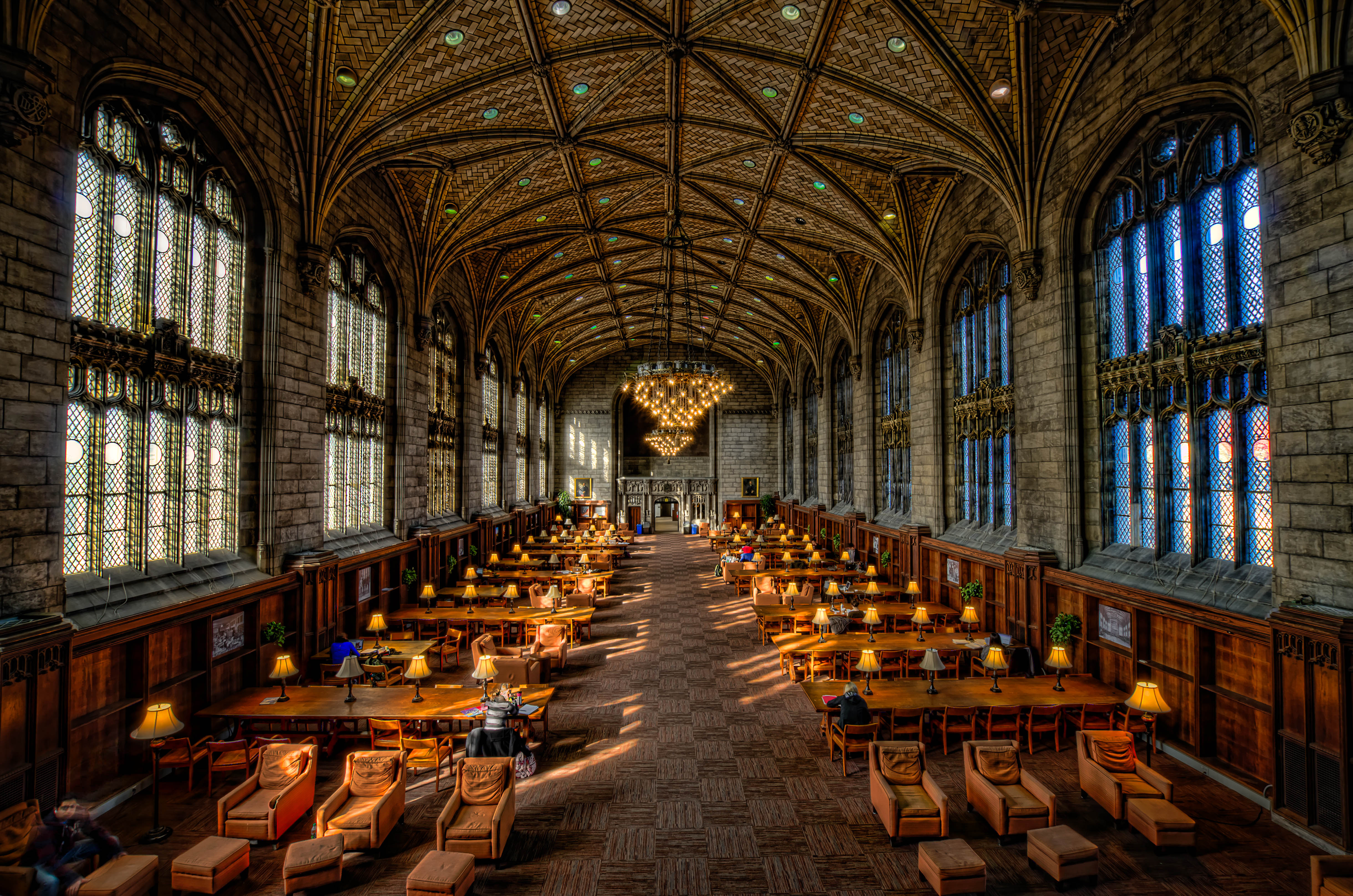
University of Chicago, Harper Library

The University of Chicago Library system encompasses six libraries that contain a total of 11 million volumes, the 9th most among library systems in the United States. The university's primary library is the Regenstein Library, which contains over 4.5 million print volumes on a variety of subjects and is the largest on campus. The Joe and Rika Mansueto Library, built in 2011, houses a large study space and an automated book storage and retrieval system. The John Crerar Library contains more than 1.4 million volumes in the biological, medical and physical sciences and collections in general science and the philosophy and history of science, medicine, and technology. The university also operates a number of special libraries, including the D'Angelo Law Library, the Social Service Administration Library, and the Eckhart Library for mathematics and computer science. The Harper Memorial Library, the first library of the university, is now a reading and study room.

=== Arts ===
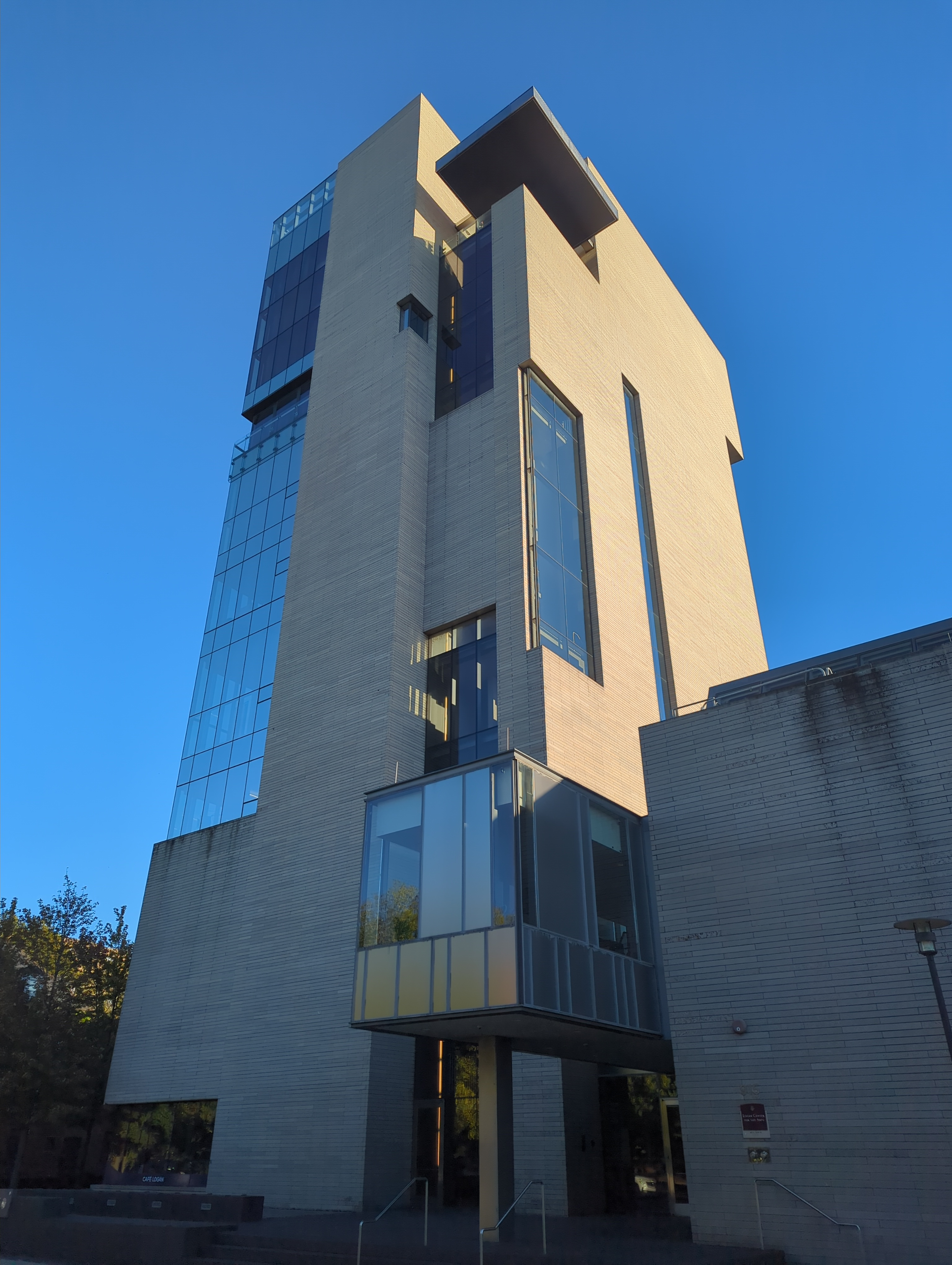
The Reva and David Logan Center for the Arts, opened in 2012

The University of Chicago Arts program joins academic departments in the Division of the Arts & Humanities and the undergraduate College, student art programs, and professional organizations including the Court Theatre, the Institute for the Study of Ancient Cultures, the Smart Museum of Art, and the Renaissance Society. The university offers graduate degrees in music, cinema and media studies, visual arts, and the humanities, among other subjects. It also offers bachelor's degree programs in visual arts, music, art history, cinema and media studies, and theater and performance studies. Several thousand major and non-major undergraduates enroll annually in creative and performing arts classes.

The university was home to the improvisational Compass Players student comedy troupe, which evolved into The Second City in 1959. The university has an artist-in-residence program, which has supported over 32 individual artists as of May 2025. The Reva and David Logan Center for the Arts opened in 2012. It was financed by a $35 million gift from alumnus David Logan and his wife Reva, the single largest cash gift to the arts in the city of Chicago As of 2025. The center includes spaces for exhibitions, performances, classes, and media production.

=== Reputation and rankings ===
Academic rankings

National
- Forbes: 17
- U.S. News & World Report: 6
- Washington Monthly: 8
- WSJ/College Pulse: 75

Global
- ARWU: 9
- QS: 24
- THE: 16
- U.S. News & World Report: 25

The University of Chicago is considered one of the most prestigious universities in the United States. The Academic Ranking of World Universities has consistently placed the University of Chicago among the top 10 universities in the world. In 2026, the university was ranked 6th by US News & World Report and 13th by Forbes. In 2025, QS World University Rankings placed the university in 13th place worldwide, while THE World University Rankings ranked the university in a tie for 14th. In 2026, Chicago was ranked 5th in the world universities ranking by Time magazine and Statista.

The university's law and business schools consistently rank among the top three professional schools in the United States. In 2025, the business school was placed in second out of 77 American schools by Bloomberg, fourth in the US by US News & World Report, and second by Fortune. In the same year, it was placed fifteenth in the world by QS World University Rankings and seventeenth by the Financial Times. In 2025, the law school was ranked third in the United States by US News & World Report and second by Above the Law. In the same year, it was ranked 11th globally by QS World University Rankings.

== Administration and finance ==
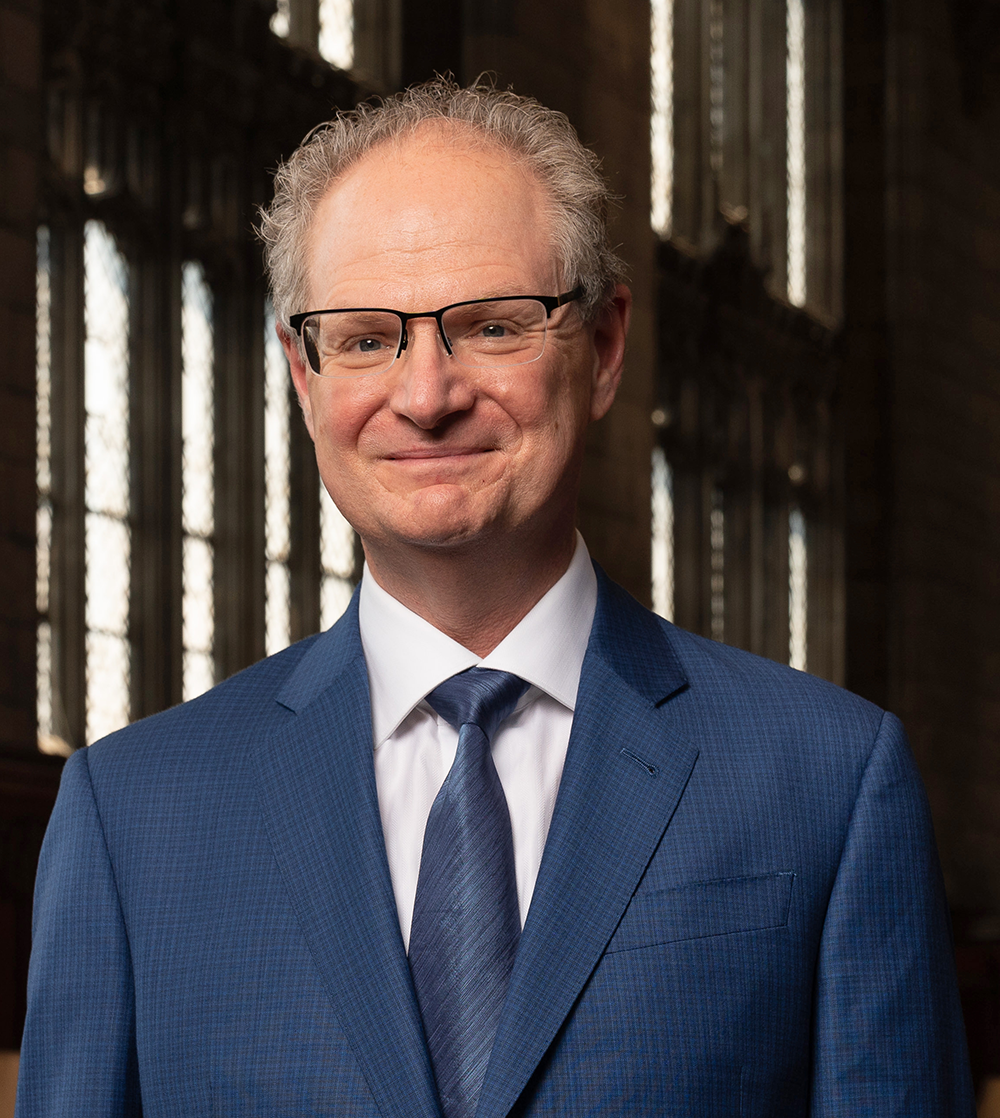
Paul Alivisatos, University of Chicago president

The university is governed by a board of trustees. The board oversees the long-term development and plans of the university and manages fundraising efforts, and is composed of 55 members including the university president. Directly beneath the president are the provost, fourteen vice presidents, including the chief financial officer and chief investment officer, and twelve deans. The current chair of the board of trustees is David Rubenstein, who has occupied the position since May 2022. The current provost is Katherine Baicker, who was appointed in March 2023. The current president of the University of Chicago is chemist Paul Alivisatos, who assumed the role on September 1, 2021.

The university's endowment was the 21st largest among American educational institutions and state university systems in 2024, valued at roughly $10.1 billion. Since 2016, the university's board of trustees has resisted pressure from students and faculty to divest its investments from fossil fuel companies. As of 2024, such investments remain a part of the university's endowment.

In fall 2023, the university employed 3,418 academic staff and 23,217 administrative staff, including those from the medical center. In 2024, the university's combined annual budget, including the university proper, the medical center, and the marine biological laboratory, stood at $5.2 billion, with the university's operations making up an additional $2.6 billion. In the same year, the university's total assets were valued at $20.3 billion.

Part of the financial plan for the university by former university president Robert Zimmer was an increase in accumulation of debt to finance large building projects. This drew both support and criticism from many in the university community. In 2024, the university budget deficit stood at $288 million despite liquidating assets to cover the gap; the administration announced plans in November of that year to close the deficit over the next four years. The financial strain has caused the university to increase its student-faculty ratio, reduce the proportion of classes taught by research faculty, and spend an unusually high percentage of undergraduate tuition on servicing debt.

In the summer of 2025, the university announced more than $100 million in budget cuts across capital projects, hiring, and graduate admissions in a response to the growing university deficit, less federal funding, and uncertainty about international student admissions.

== Student body and admissions ==
Undergraduate admissions statistics
- 2025 entering class
- Admit rate: 4.48% (▼ −2)
- Yield rate: 87.59% (▲ +4.14)

In fall 2025, the university enrolled 7,496 undergraduate students, 11,195 graduate students, and 408 non-degree students. The college class of 2025 is composed of 53% male and 47% female students. Twenty-seven percent of the class identify as Asian, 19% as Hispanic, and 10% as Black. Eighteen percent of the class is international. The university is need-blind for domestic applicants.

Admission to the University of Chicago has become highly selective over the past two decades, reflecting changes in the application process, school popularity, and marketing strategy. Between 1996 and 2023, the acceptance rate of the college fell from 71% to 4.7%.

The middle 50% band of SAT scores for the undergraduate class of 2025 was 1510–1570 (98th–99th percentiles), the average MCAT score for students entering the Pritzker School of Medicine class of 2024 was 519 (97th percentile), the median GMAT score for students entering the full-time Booth MBA program class of 2023 was 740 (97th percentile), and the median LSAT score for students entering the Law School class of 2021 was 172 (99th percentile).

In 2018, the University of Chicago attracted national headlines by becoming the first major research university to no longer require SAT or ACT scores from college applicants.

== Athletics ==
Official athletics logo

The University of Chicago hosts 19 varsity sports teams: 10 men's teams and 9 women's teams, all called the Maroons, with 502 students participating in the 2012–2013 school year. The Maroons compete in the NCAA Division III as members of the University Athletic Association (UAA). Their mascot is Phil the Phoenix.

The university was a founding member of the Big Ten Conference and participated in the NCAA Division I men's basketball and football. In 1935, the University of Chicago reached the Sweet Sixteen. In 1935, Chicago Maroons football player Jay Berwanger became the first winner of the Heisman Trophy. However, the university chose to withdraw from the Big Ten Conference in 1946 after University president Robert Maynard Hutchins de-emphasized varsity athletics in 1939 and dropped football. In 1969, Chicago reinstated football as a Division III team, resuming play at the new Stagg Field.

The University of Chicago is home to the University of Chicago Rugby Football Club (UCRFC). Since 2022, men's rugby competes in the Division II Great Midwest Conference (MWC) under National Collegiate Rugby, having previously competed under USA Rugby. It was ranked 15th in the country at the end of the 2024 fall 15s season, falling to Montana State 19–48 in the Sweet Sixteen NCR DII playoff round. It competes in a Rugby 7s circuit in the spring. It shares its conference with Loyola University Chicago, the University of Illinois Chicago, Northwestern University (for which it competes in a yearly cup, the Hutchins-Scott Cup), DePaul University, and Benedictine University. A women's club also exists at the university.

Founded in 1939, UChicago's Sailing Club is one of the oldest in the country. The team competes in the Midwestern Collegiate Sailing Association conference within the Intercollegiate Sailing Association. From 2022 to 2025, the team won 4 conference championships granting berths to national championship regattas.

The university is also home to the ultimate frisbee team UChicago Fission.

== Student life ==
Student body composition as of May 10, 2025
Race and ethnicity	Total
White	31%
Asian	20%
Foreign national	16%
Hispanic	17%
Other (Note: Other consists of Multiracial Americans & those who prefer to not say.)	9%
Black	7%
Economic diversity
Low-income (Note: The percentage of students who received an income-based federal Pell grant intended for low-income students.)	14%

=== Student organizations ===
Students at the University of Chicago operate more than 400 clubs and organizations known as Recognized Student Organizations (RSOs). These include cultural and religious groups, academic clubs and teams, and common-interest organizations. Among notable student organizations are the nation's longest continuously running student film society Doc Films, the organizing committee for the University of Chicago Scavenger Hunt, and the student newspaper The Chicago Maroon.

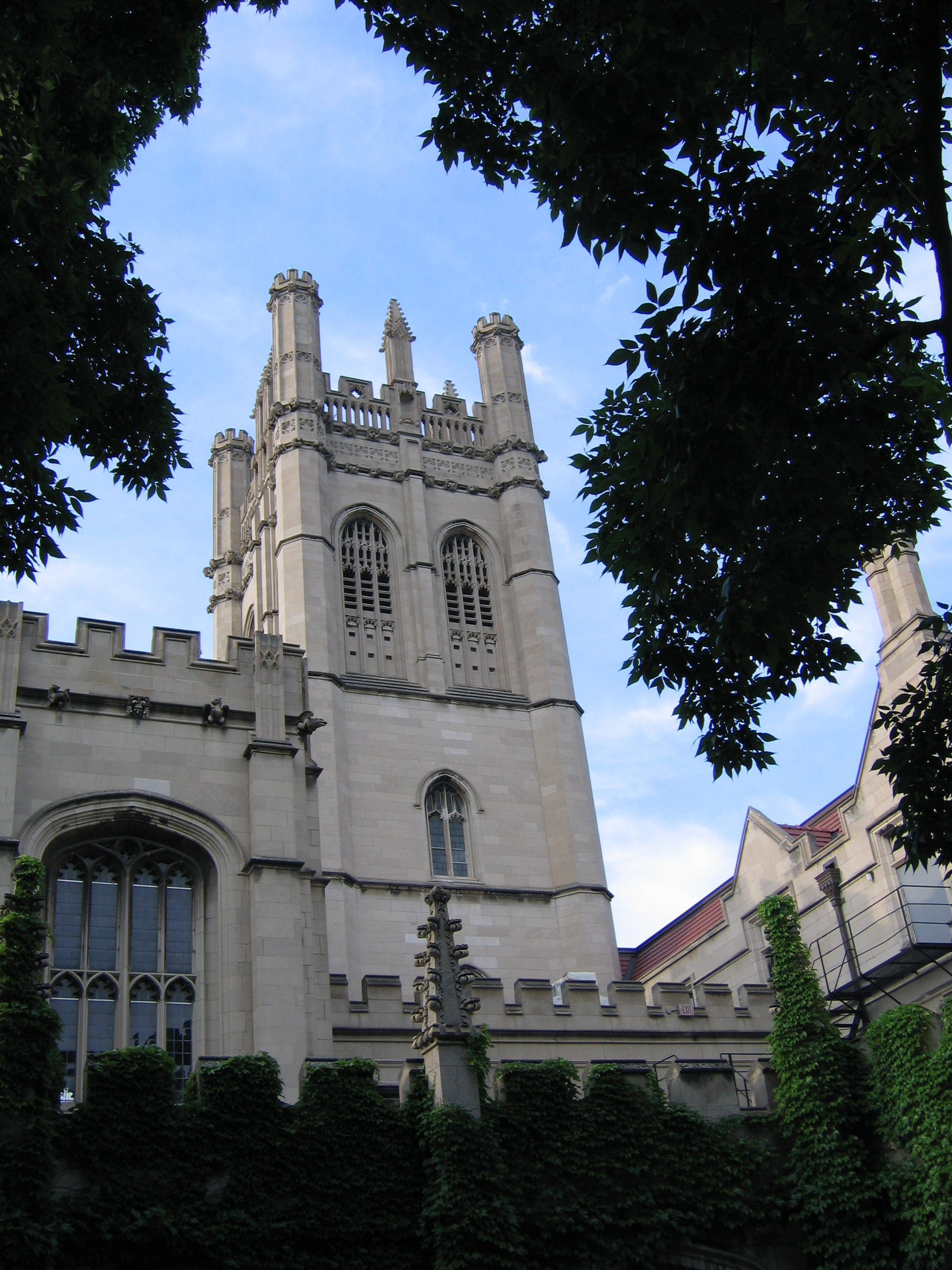
The university's Reynolds Club, the student center

==== Student government ====
All recognized student organizations are funded by the University of Chicago Undergraduate Student Government. The Undergraduate Student Government consists of undergraduate students elected to represent members from their respective academic units. It is led by an executive committee, chaired by a president with the assistance of four vice presidents (one for student affairs, campus life, advocacy and student organizations), an executive vice president and a board of trustee liaison who are elected, typically together as a slate, by the student body each spring. As of 2026, the Undergraduate Student Government annual budget was greater than $2.5 million.

The Graduate Council separately governs the graduate student population of the University of Chicago, consisting of an inter-division executive board and one to two graduate council representatives from each division or professional school in the university.

Prior to 2021, the Undergraduate Student Government was known as the College Council which, with the Graduate Council, formed the university's Student Government.

==== Fraternities and sororities ====
According to a 2016 Maroon article, 19.6% of undergraduates were members of fraternities or sororities. While the university does not recognize any non-professional fraternities or sororities as registered student organizations, there are over 30 greek organizations operating on campus as of 2026.

=== Student housing ===
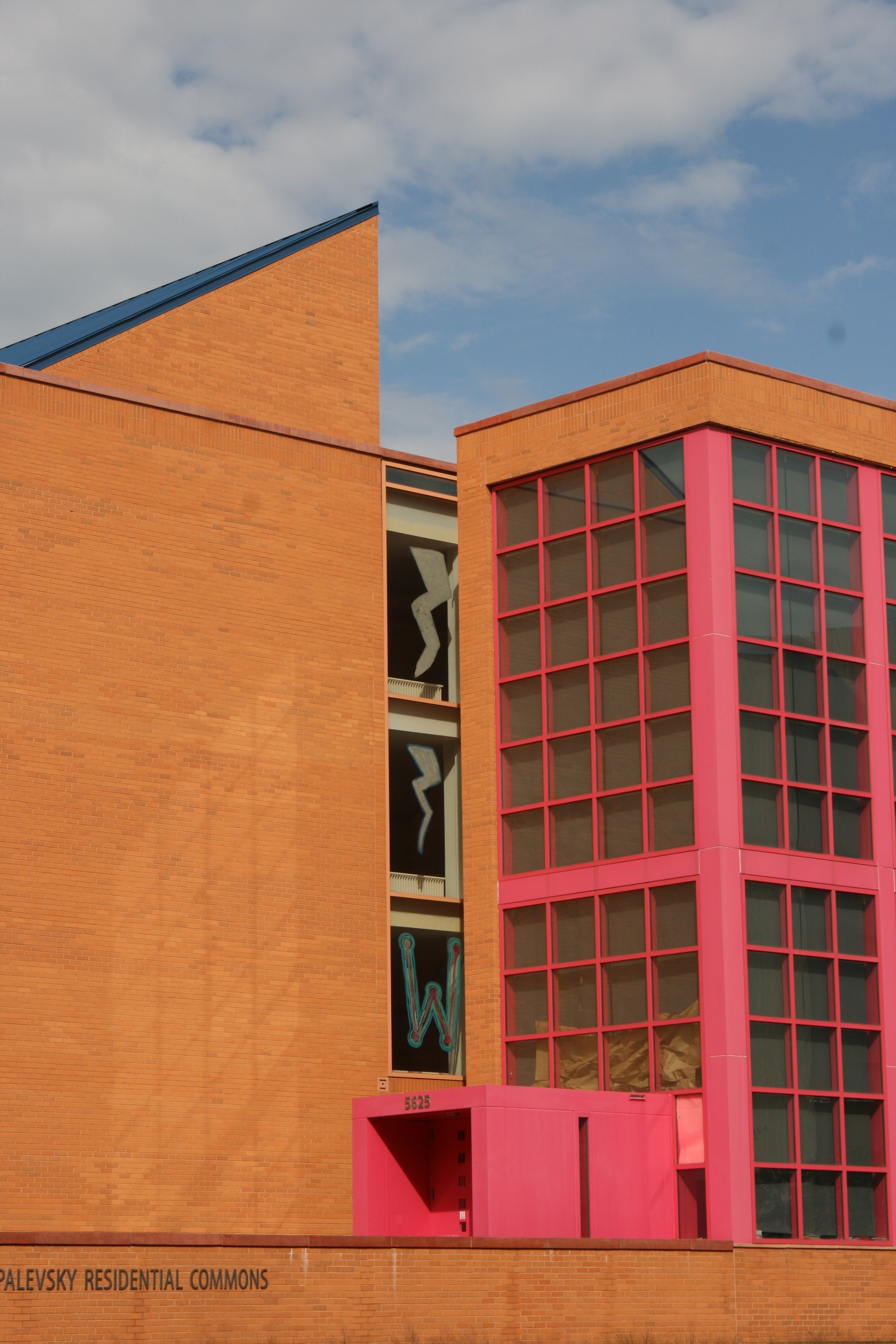
Max Palevsky Residential Commons is a dormitory completed in 2001 designed by postmodernist Mexican architect Ricardo Legorreta.

On-campus undergraduate students at the University of Chicago participate in a house system in which each student is assigned to one of the university's seven residence hall buildings and to a smaller community within their residence hall called a "house". There are 48 houses, with an average of 80 students in each house. The houses are named after former professors and other historical figures in the university community, such as Eugene Fama.

Students are required to live in on-campus housing for the first six quarters of enrollment. As of September 2025, 60% of undergraduate students live on campus.

The university owns and manages more than 300 residential units near campus for graduate students.

=== Traditions ===
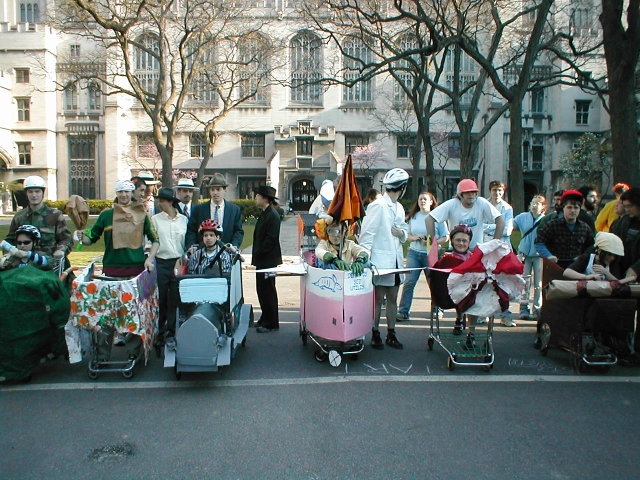
Qwazy Quad Rally, Scav Hunt 2005

Every May since 1987, the University of Chicago has held the University of Chicago Scavenger Hunt, in which teams of students compete to obtain notoriously esoteric items from a list. Every January, the university holds a week-long winter festival, Kuviasungnerk/Kangeiko (Kuvia), which includes early morning exercise routines and fitness workshops. The university also annually holds a carnival and concert called Summer Breeze, which hosts outside musicians. Ida Noyes Hall is home to Doc Films, a student film society founded in 1932 that screens films nightly at the university. Since 1946, the university has organized the Latke-Hamantash Debate, which involves humorous discussions about the relative merits and meanings of latkes and hamantashen. Since 2002, the Ida Noyes Pub has hosted Trivia Nights for university affiliates each Tuesday.

== Notable people ==
Notable alumni

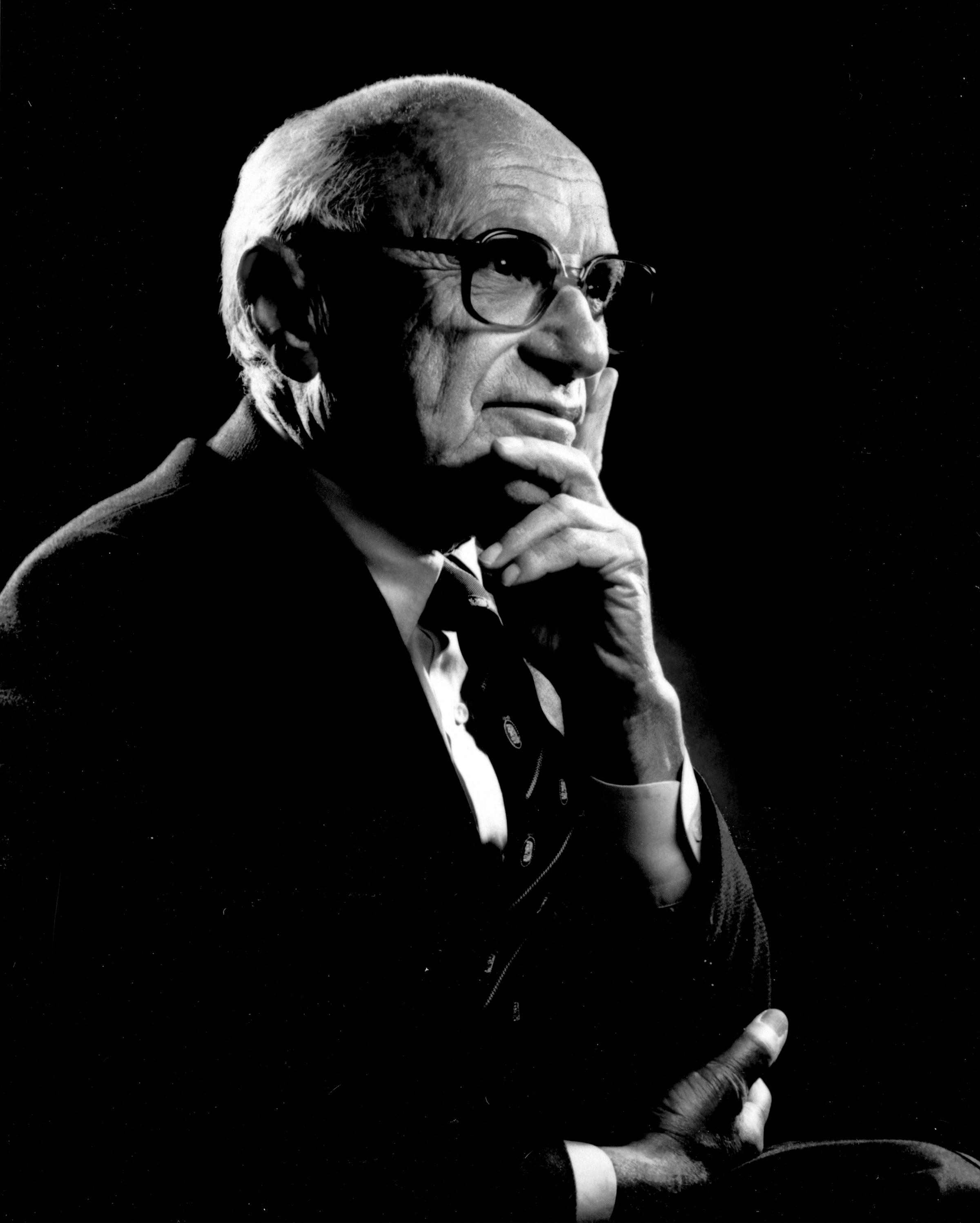
Milton Friedman

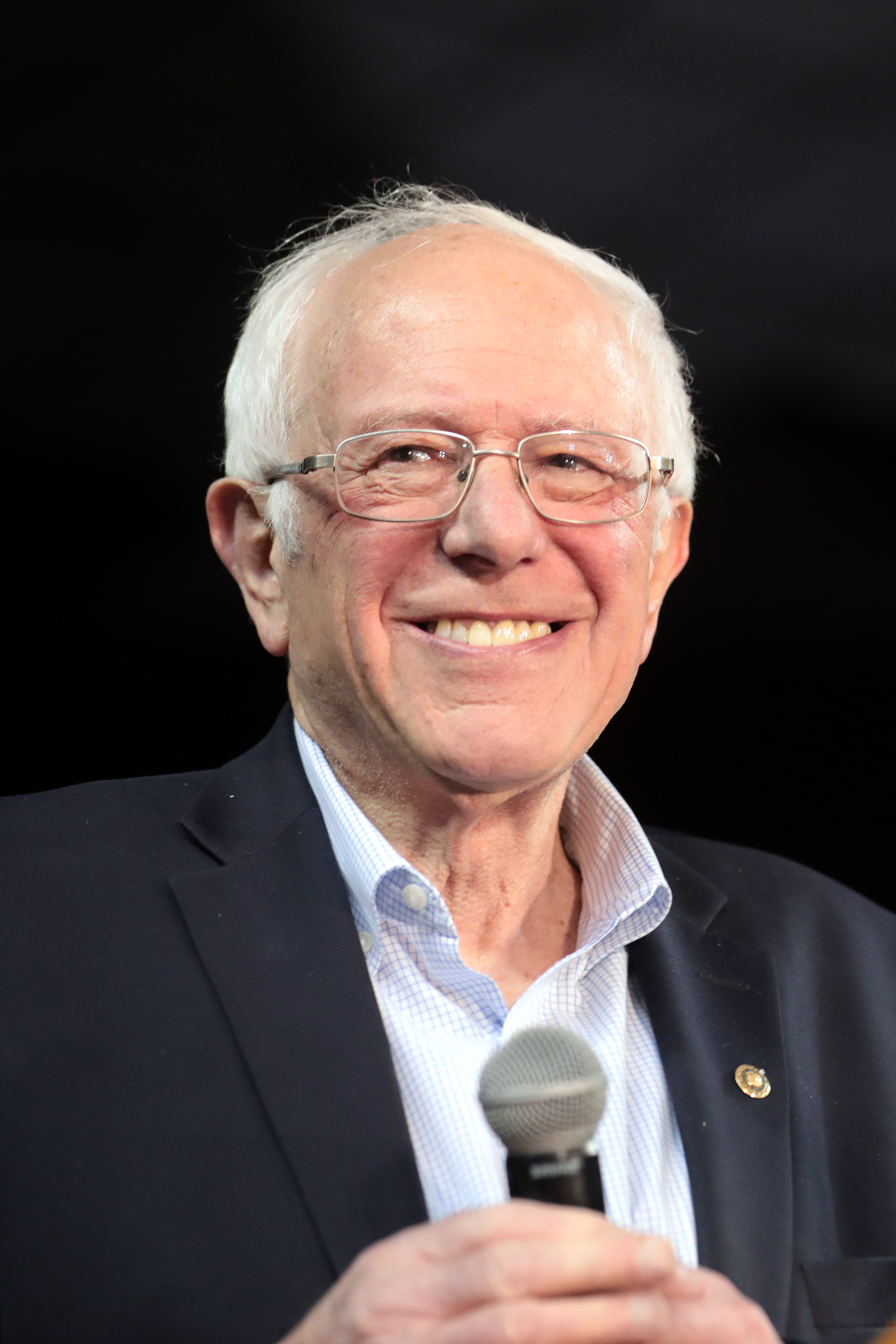
Bernie Sanders

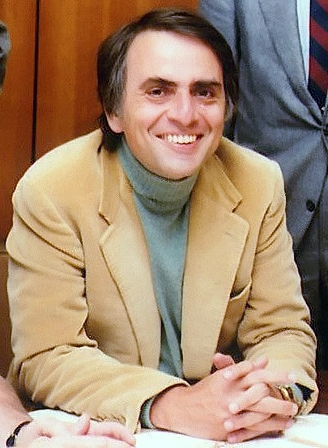
Carl Sagan

Since the university's establishment in 1890, there have been 102 Nobel laureates across all six categories affiliated with the University of Chicago, 21 of whom were pursuing research or on faculty at the university at the time of their award announcement. Of these 102 Nobel Prizes, 30 were in Physics, 19 in Chemistry, 13 in Physiology/Medicine, 3 in Literature, 1 in Peace, and 32 in Economics. Chicago faculty and alumni also include eleven Fields Medalists, seventeen National Medal of Science recipients, four Turing Award winners, fifty-eight MacArthur Fellows, five John Bates Clark Medalists, thirty Marshall Scholars, fifty-six Rhodes Scholars, twenty-seven Pulitzer Prize winners, twenty National Humanities Medalists, and six Olympic medalists.

Chicago alumni have gone on to become notable in several fields. In particular, alumni include CEOs of firms such as Microsoft, Goldman Sachs, and Credit Suisse; six heads of state or government across five continents; eight U.S. cabinet secretaries; ten U.S. senators; four central bank presidents or directors, including the World Bank; one U.S. Supreme Court justice; and presidents of Princeton, Northwestern, and MIT.

Notable faculty include three Supreme Court justices, one central bank governor, and numerous Nobel Prize laureates. Former U.S. president Barack Obama, poet T.S. Eliot, and writer Ralph Ellison all served on the faculty.

== In pop culture ==
The University of Chicago is the alma mater of fictional characters Harry Burns and Sally Albright (from When Harry Met Sally), Indiana Jones, and Mark Watney (from The Martian). It has served as a filming location for scenes in Divergent, The Fugitive, and Sense8.

Abe Ravelstein, the titular character of the novel Ravelstein, was based on UChicago faculty member Allan Bloom.
