= University of Chicago sit-ins =

Non-violent protests at the University of Chicago in 1962

- Part of the Civil Rights Movement
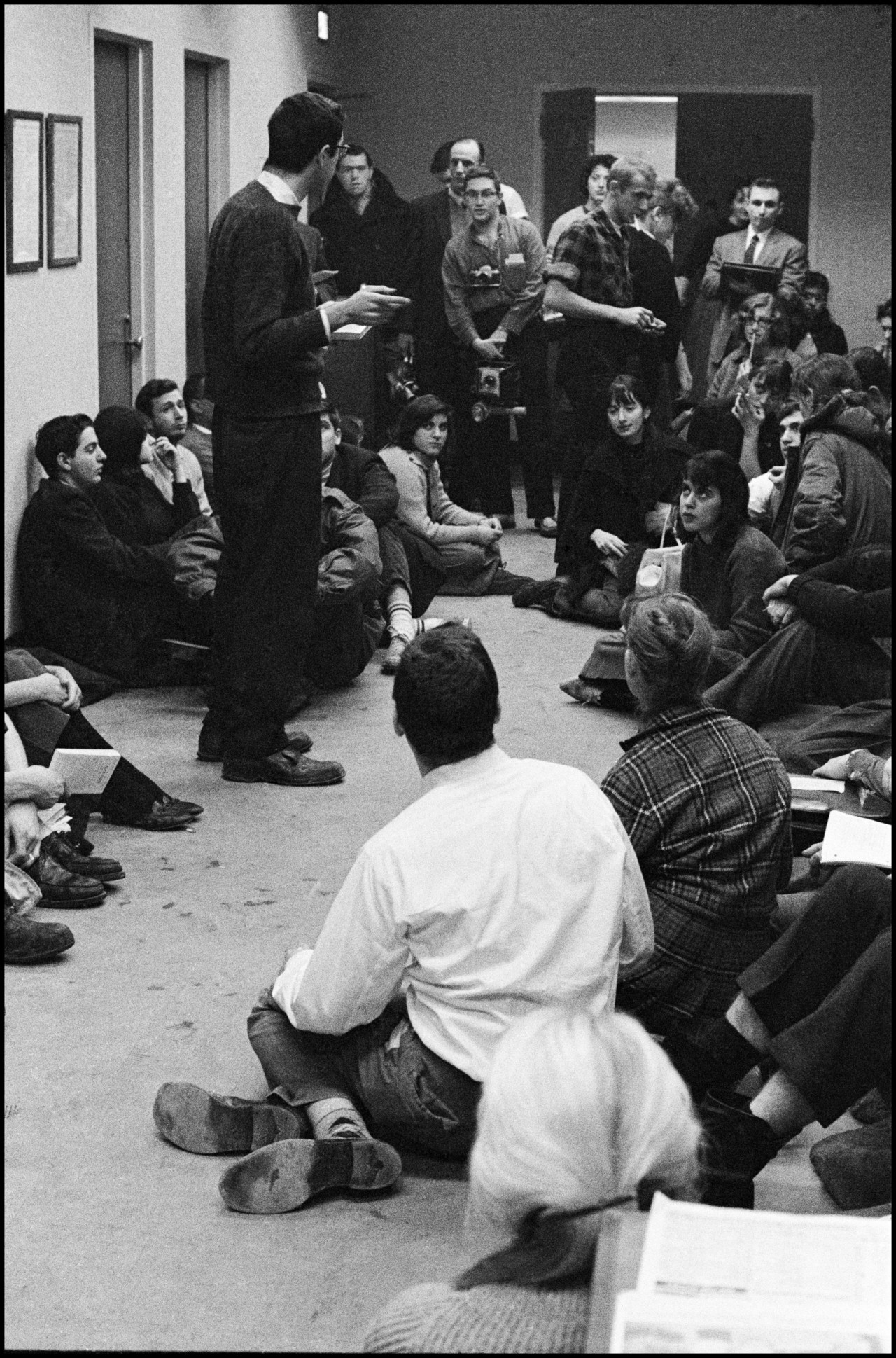
- Bernie Sanders speaks to protesters on January 23, 1962, the first day of the sit-ins.
- Date: January 23 – February 5, 1962
- Location: Chicago, Illinois
- Caused by: Racial segregation in off-campus housing

Parties
Congress of Racial Equality (CORE); Student Government	University of Chicago (UChicago)

Lead figures
Member of CORE: Bernie Sanders	President of UChicago: George Beadle

The University of Chicago sit-ins were a series of nonviolent protests at the University of Chicago in Chicago, Illinois, in 1962. The protests were called to end alleged segregation in off-campus university-owned residential properties.

== Events ==
=== Dialogue ===
Front page of Chicago Maroon on January 17, 1962, with the headline "UC Admits Housing Segregation"

According to Chicago Maroon managing editor Avima Ruder, a staffer at the student paper, found a copy of the university budget, and "we discovered that the University owned a lot of segregated apartment buildings...It was really bizarre because our student population at that point was largely white, but there was no segregation, there weren't separate dorms for African American students—if someone had suggested that, people would have been appalled."

At first, the editors decided not to publish the news. Instead, they shared the apartment addresses with the Student Government, which reached out to the university chapter of the Congress of Racial Equality (CORE) to "conduct six test cases in which African American students attempted and failed to secure apartments in the segregated buildings." Student Government and CORE confronted President George Beadle with their findings and demanded the buildings be desegregated. On January 17, 1962, the Maroon broke the story on the paper's front page with the headline, "UC Admits Housing Segregation." Beadle wrote a letter to the paper, agreeing that the university segregation was a problem, emphasizing the university's nondiscrimination policy and the difference between on-campus housing, which was open to all, and commercial residential properties acquired by the university, many of which had existing segregation policies. "The only issue on which there is arguable difference of opinion," Beadle wrote, "is the rate at which it is possible to move toward the agreed objective without losing more than is gained."

=== Protests ===
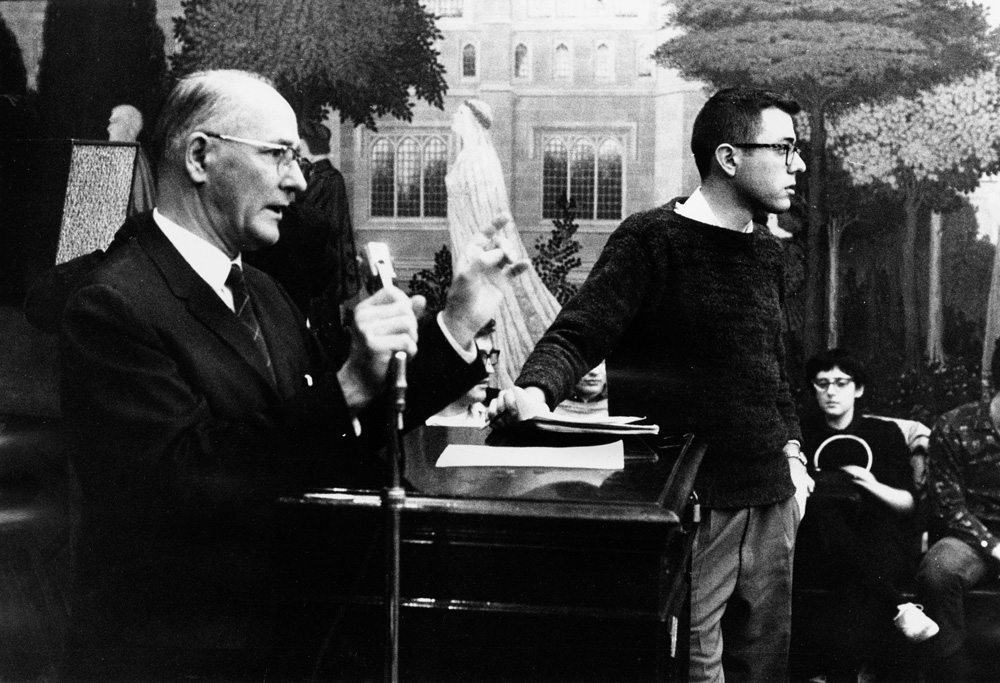
George Beadle and Sanders at the CORE meeting in Ida Noyes Hall, February 1962

Frustrated with Beadle's call for "planned, stable integration," CORE activists, including Bernie Sanders, led a rally at the University of Chicago administration building to protest university president George Beadle's segregated campus housing policy. "We feel it is an intolerable situation when Negro and white students of the university cannot live together in university-owned apartments," Sanders announced at the protest. Sanders and thirty-two other student activists marched into the building and camped outside the president's office.

From January 23 to February 5, Sanders and the other civil rights protesters pressured Beadle and the university to form a commission to investigate discrimination. Beadle met with 300 students in the Ida Noyes Hall theater to announce that further sit-ins would be banned and that a committee would be formed to investigate CORE's charges of racial discrimination in University-owned buildings.

== See also ==
- Free Speech Movement
