= Hutchinson Commons =

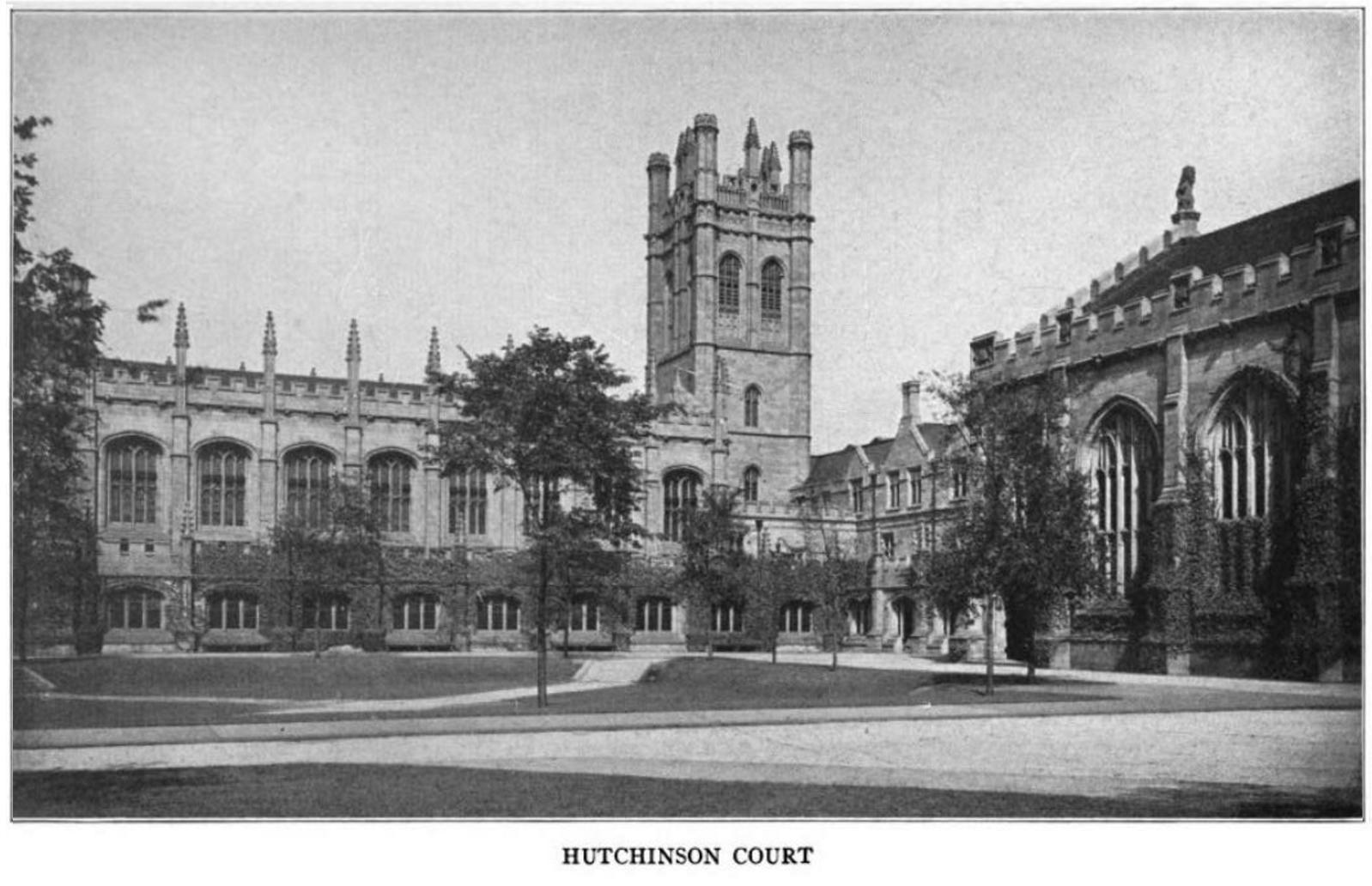
- Hutchinson Court, from The University of Chicago - An Official Guide - June, 1916. Hutchinson Commons is shown to the left of Mitchell Tower.

- Location within Chicago metropolitan area
- Former names: Men's Commons

General information
- Status: extant
- Type: Dining Hall with kitchens, assembly area
- Architectural style: neo-Gothic
- Location: 1131 E 57th Street, Chicago, Illinois
- Coordinates: 41.7910°N 87.5987°W
- Construction started: 1890; 136 years ago
- Completed: 1893; 133 years ago
- Owner: The University of Chicago

Design and construction
- Architect: Shepley, Rutan and Coolidge

Hutchinson Commons (also known as Hutchinson Hall) at the University of Chicago is a dining hall and lounge for university students and professors.

It was modeled, nearly identically, on the hall of Christ Church, one of Oxford University's constituent colleges. The great room (or main dining room) measures 115 by 40 feet (35 by 12 m), and was for many years the principal site of convocations of the university. It is located in Chicago's Hyde Park community and is currently used as a dining hall and lounge for university students and professors. The building was donated to the University by the banker, philanthropist and university trustee and treasurer Charles L. Hutchinson through a donation of $60,000 (equivalent to $2,150,000 in 2025) for the purpose.

== Gallery ==
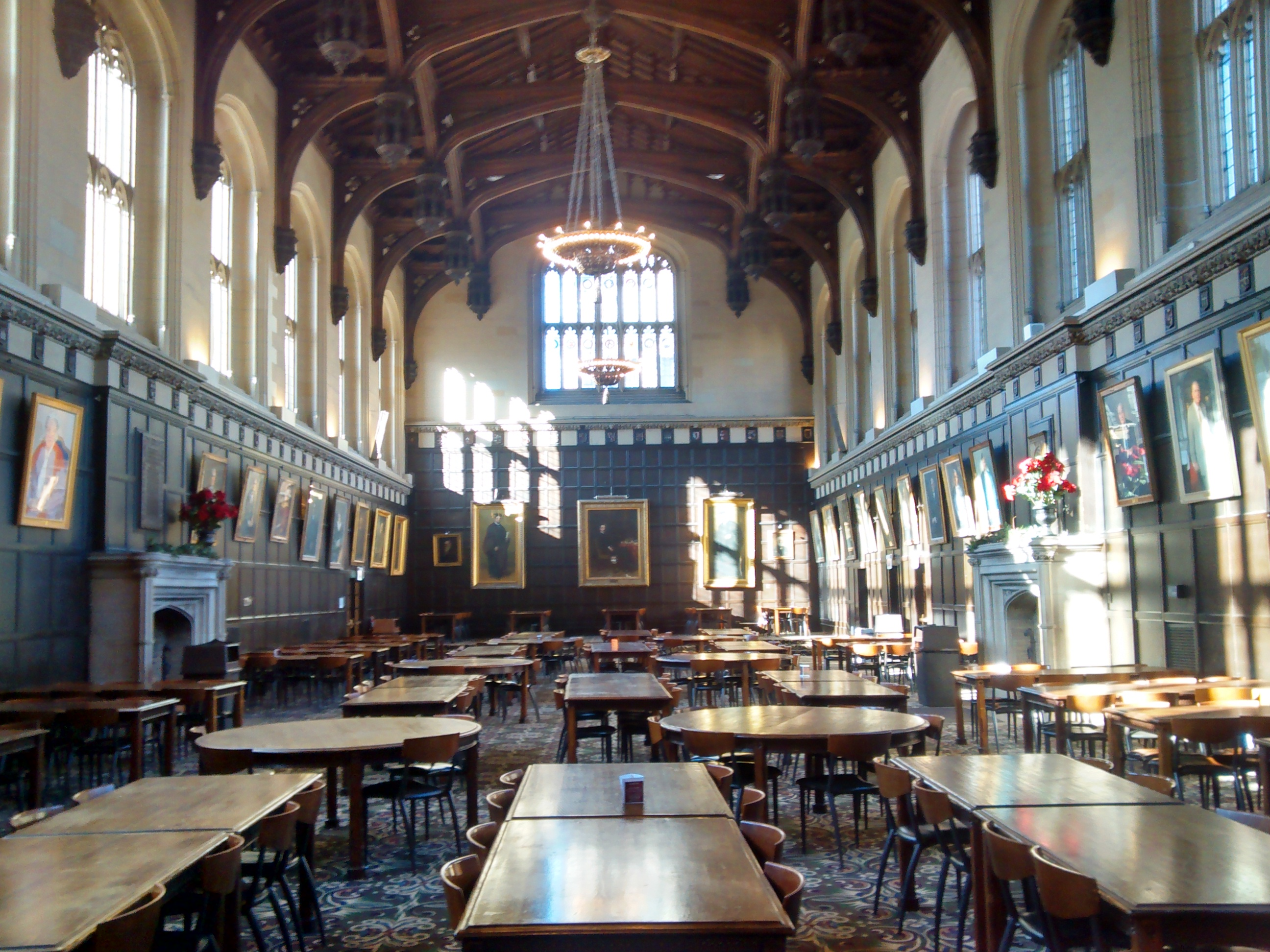
The interior of Hutchinson Commons in 2014
