= Graham School of Continuing Liberal and Professional Studies =

School of the University of Chicago, US

Coordinates: 41.785783°N 87.590531°W

University of Chicago Graham School of Continuing Liberal and Professional Studies
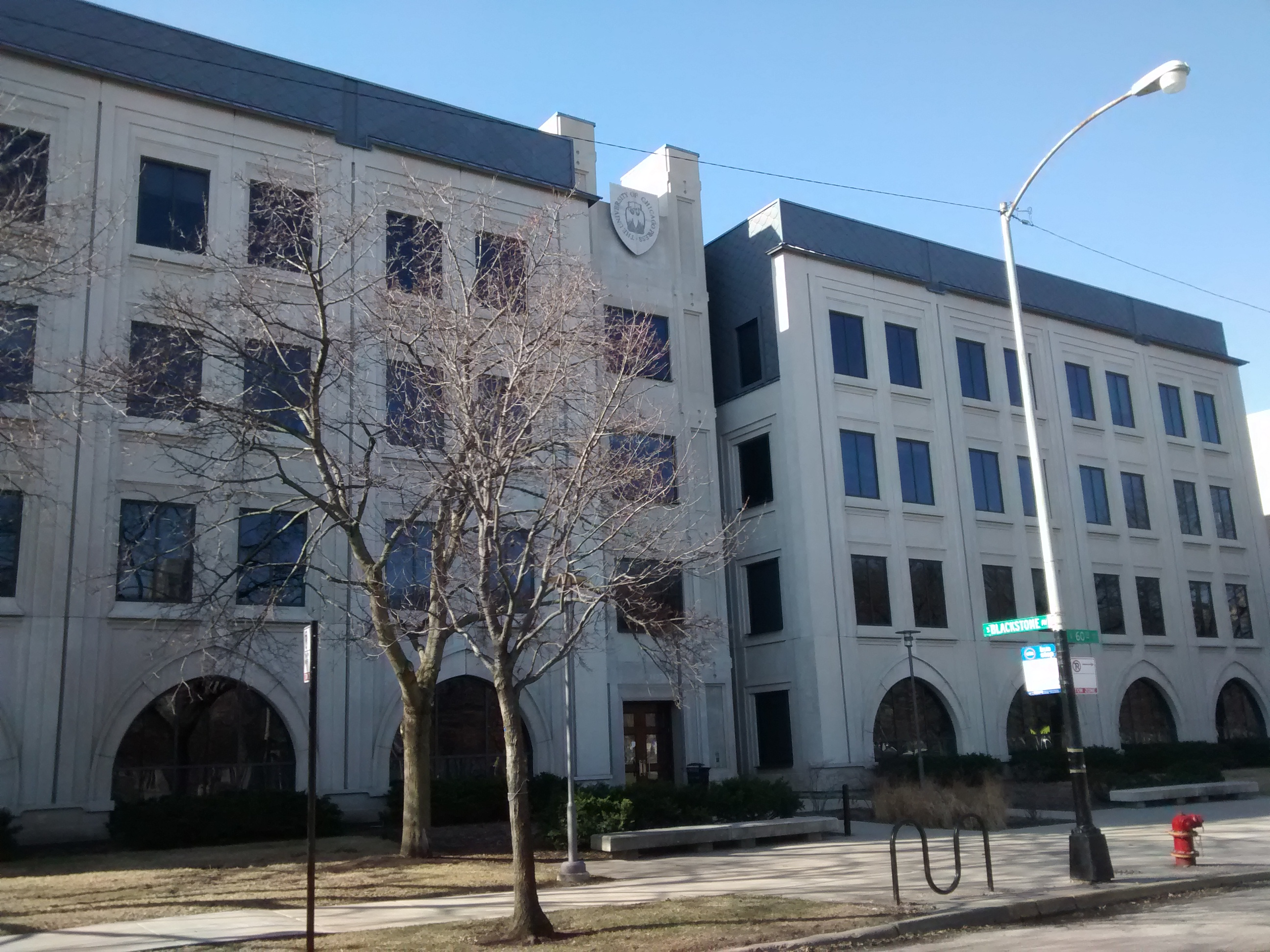
- Other names: The William B. and Catherine V. Graham School of Continuing Liberal and Professional Studies
- Former name: Continuing Education Division (1890–1997)
- Type: Private
- Established: 1890
- Parent institution: University of Chicago
- Dean: Seth Green
- Location: Chicago, Illinois, United States
- Campus: Urban
- Website: graham.uchicago.edu

The University of Chicago Graham School of Continuing Liberal and Professional Studies is the continuing education school of the University of Chicago. Founded alongside the university in 1890, the school offers Master of Liberal Arts degree programs, academic certificate programs, and a variety of credit and non-credit courses for graduate students at large, returning scholars, and adult learners. It conducts lecture series and other programs throughout the year.

The school's administrative offices can be found on the University of Chicago's main campus in the Hyde Park neighborhood. Courses are offered online and in person at the University of Chicago Gleacher Center in downtown Chicago.

== History ==
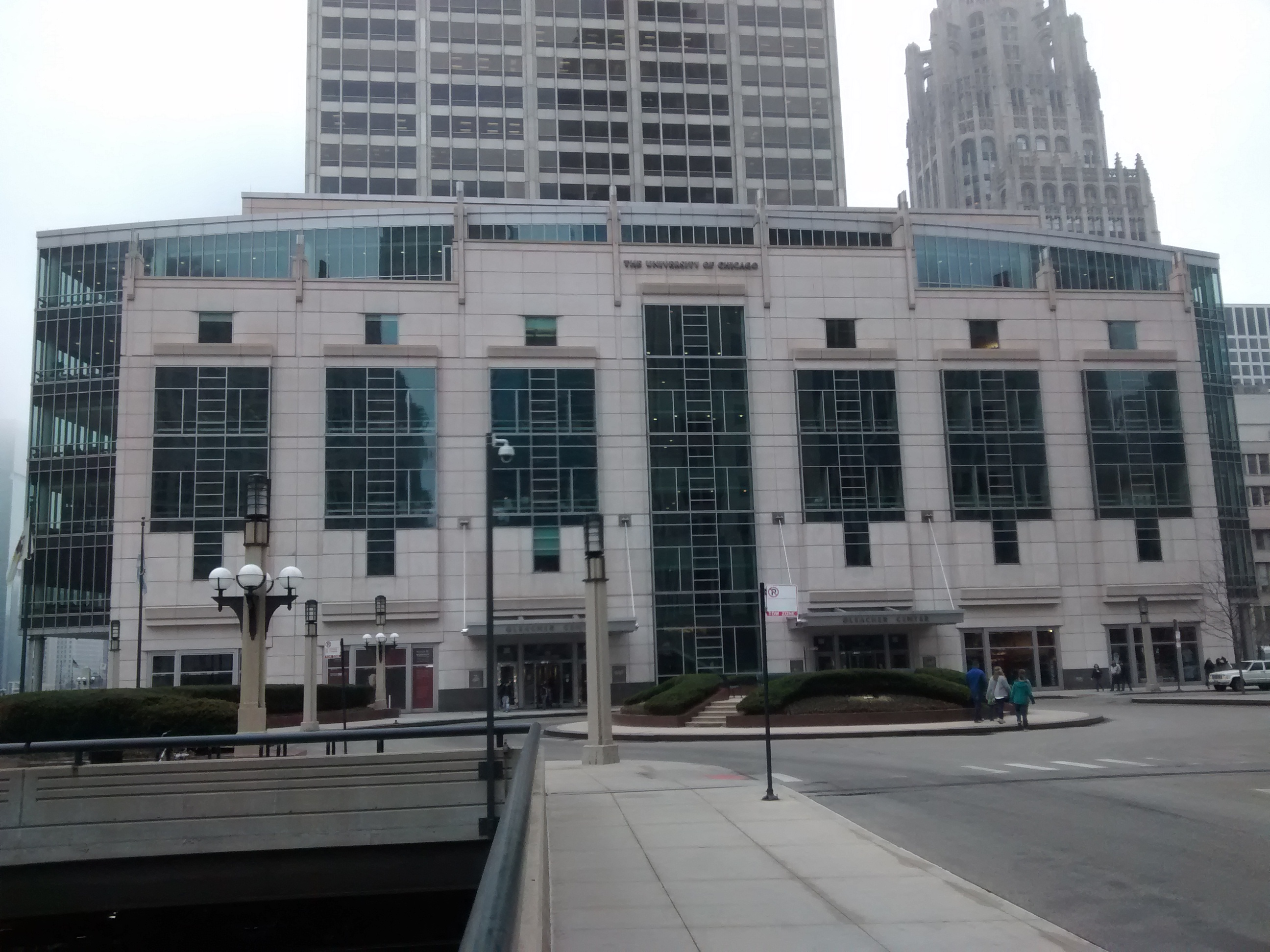
The Gleacher Center

Founded alongside the University of Chicago in 1890, the university's Continuing Education Division operated in similar fashion to the Chautauqua movement at Oxford and Cambridge, with instructors traveling by train to teach in surrounding communities. The continuing education branch was reformed in 1997 with a $10 million donation from William and Catherine Graham, upon which the name of the division was changed to the "William B. and Catherine V. Graham School of General Studies". On July 1, 2011, the school updated its name to the "University of Chicago Graham School of Continuing Liberal and Professional Studies".

The Graham School offers a Master of Liberal Arts and for-credit graduate-level courses through the Graduate Student-at-Large program. Graduate students-at-large take University of Chicago graduate courses for grades and build a transferable record of study for matriculation into a degree program at the University of Chicago or elsewhere. Returning scholars audit University of Chicago courses, but are not graded for their work and do not build a transferable record of study.

The Basic Program of Liberal Education for Adults, modeled after the University of Chicago Common Core, exposes students to the Great Books of the Classical and Western traditions, and to the Socratic method of teaching and discussion.

The Graham School's non-credit offerings cover a wide variety of topics and are aimed at the college graduate who wishes to either expand their knowledge of a certain area or learn a marketable job skill. Non-credit courses are offered in the following areas:

- Basic Program of Liberal Education for Adults
- Museum Publishing Seminar
- Open-to-All Courses in the Liberal Arts
- The Writer's Studio
- A Fortnight in Oxford

== Public Events ==
The Graham School offers multiple lecture series open to the public.
