= Chicago school =

Chicago school may refer to:

== University of Chicago ==
- Chicago school (economics)
- Chicago school (literary criticism)
- Chicago school (mathematical analysis)
- Chicago school (sociology)
- Chicago school (theology)

== Other ==
- Chicago school (architecture)
- The Chicago School, a private university in Chicago, not associated with the University of Chicago
- Chicago school (music), a style of post-rock
