= University of Chicago Undergraduate Student Government =

Student government in the United States

- Logo of the USG
- Institution: University of Chicago
- Location: Chicago, Illinois
- President: Kevin Guo
- Executive officers: Aaron Horowitz (Executive Vice President); Grace Beatty (College Council Chair); Esther Ma (College Council Vice Chair); Audrey Krajewski (Board of Trustee Liaison); Destiney Samare (Vice President of Advocacy); Aidan Keesler (Vice President of Student Affairs); Yero Diamanka (Vice President of Campus Life); Fred Lee (Vice President of Student Organizations)
- Website: www.uchicagocollegecouncil.com

The University of Chicago Undergraduate Student Government (USG) is the student government of the Undergraduate Student Association, which comprises all students of the College at the University of Chicago. The USG is led by the Cabinet, composed of elected and appointed officers, and its representative body is the College Council, composed of elected representatives from all class years. It allocates over $2 million USD per year to Registered Student Organizations (RSOs), sports clubs and other student initiatives, and promotes and sponsors initiatives addressing issues on campus via its various committees.

== History ==
=== Executive pay controversy ===
In spring 2018, the student government voted to pass the Executive Leadership Remuneration Act (ELRA), which would pay the student body president and vice presidents a total of $9000 per year, to be paid by Student Life Fees collected from the undergraduate body. The move was widely unpopular among the student population and was seen as self-serving, leading to a grassroots effort to trigger a school-wide referendum on repealing the ELRA bill. Ultimately, the referendum succeeded and the ELRA was repealed by a large margin (the vote count was 1,138 to 531).

=== Undergraduate/Graduate Student Government split ===
In 2021, the Initiative Development and Executive Augmentation (IDEA) Act, which restructures the current student government into separate undergraduate and graduate student governments, was passed by the College Council.

== Cabinet ==
The Cabinet consists of the President, Executive Vice President, College Council Chair, College Council Vice Chair, Board of Trustees Liaison, Vice President of Advocacy, Vice President of Student Affairs, Vice President of Student Life, and Vice President of Student Organizations. The position of the Vice President of Student Organizations is an appointed position by committees of the Undergraduate Student Government focusing on RSOs.
