= University libraries in the United States =

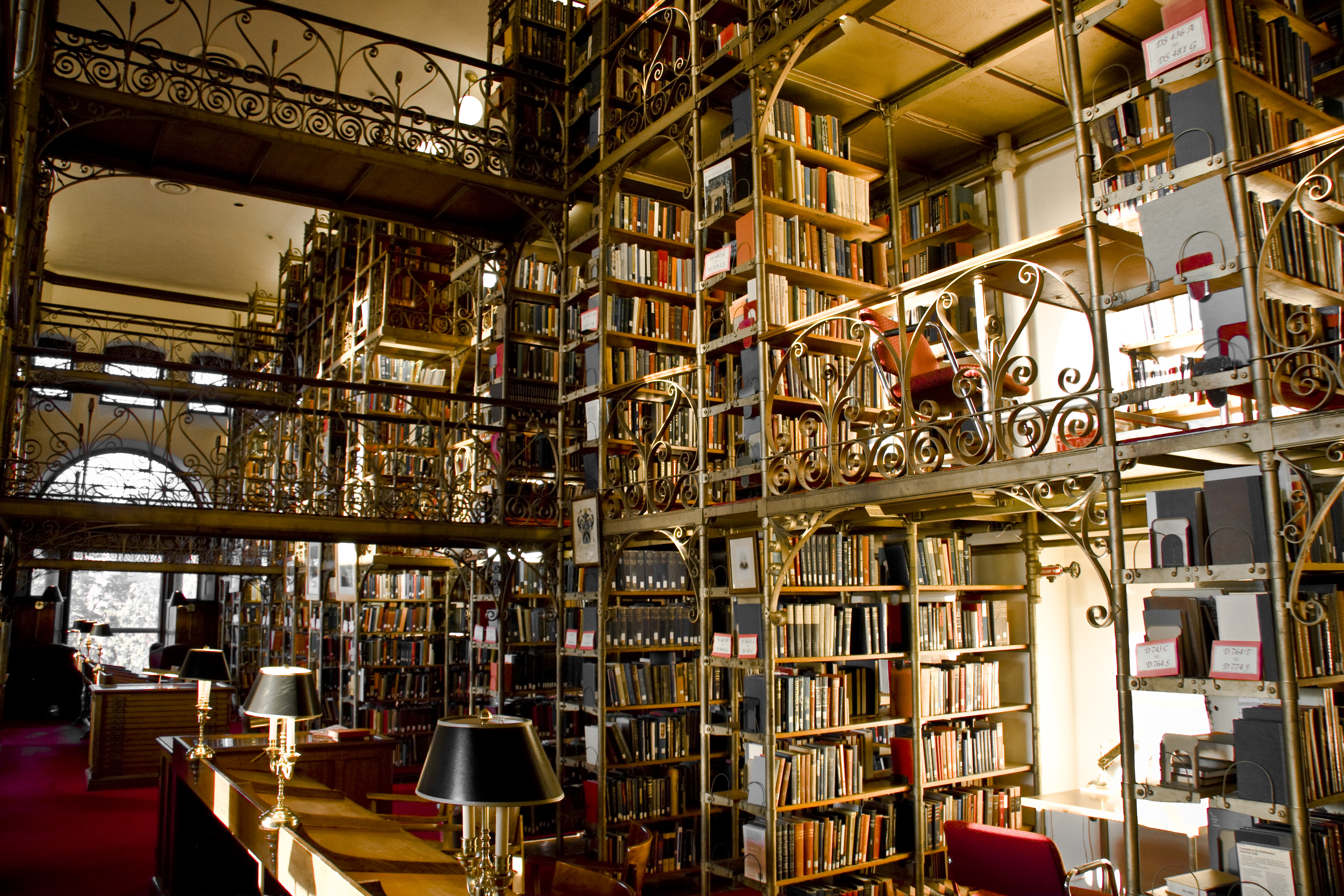
The reading room in Uris Library at Cornell University

The United States contains some of the largest academic libraries in the world. Among the most notable collections are those at Harvard University, the University of Michigan, Yale University, the University of Illinois at Urbana–Champaign, and Columbia University. Many others were founded more recently, and are consequently on a much smaller scale.

== History ==
The first colleges in the United States were intended to train members of the clergy. The libraries associated with these institutions largely consisted of donated books on the subjects of theology and the classics. In 1766, Yale University had approximately 4,000 volumes, second only to Harvard University. Access to these libraries was restricted to faculty members and a few students: the only staff was a part-time faculty member or the president of the college. The priority of the library was to protect the books, not to allow patrons to use them. In 1849, Yale was open 30 hours a week, the University of Virginia was open nine hours a week, Columbia University four, and Bowdoin College only three. Students instead created literary societies and assessed entrance fees in order to build a small collection of usable volumes often in excess of what the university library held.

Around the turn of the century, this approach began to change. The American Library Association was formed in 1876, with members including Melvil Dewey and Charles Ammi Cutter. Libraries re-prioritized in favor of improving access to materials, and found funding increasing as a result of increased demand for said materials.

Academic libraries today vary in regard to the extent to which they accommodate those who are not affiliated with their parent universities. Some offer reading and borrowing privileges to members of the public on payment of an annual fee; such fees can vary greatly. The privileges so obtained usually do not extend to such services as computer usage, other than to search the catalog, or Internet access. Alumni and students of cooperating local universities may be given discounts or other consideration when arranging for borrowing privileges. On the other hand, access to the libraries of some universities is absolutely restricted to students, faculty, and staff. Even in this case, they may make it possible for others to borrow materials through inter-library loan programs.

Libraries of land-grant universities generally are more accessible to the public. In some cases they are official government document repositories and so are required to be open to the public. Still, members of the public are generally charged fees for borrowing privileges, and usually are not allowed to access everything they would be able to as students.

== Largest academic libraries ==
The 20 largest academic libraries in the United States by number of volumes as of 2020 are:

Rank	Institution	Library holdings (volumes) (2020)
1	Harvard University	19,608,349
2	University of Michigan	16,025,996
3	Yale University	15,421,200
4	University of Illinois Urbana-Champaign	15,385,227
5	Columbia University	15,029,945 (Note: Columbia University Libraries is closely affiliated with the Jewish Theological Seminary Library, whose collection consists of over 400,000 volumes, but is not included in the ARL count.)
6	University of California, Los Angeles	14,054,297
7	University of California, Berkeley	13,475,065
8	University of Chicago	12,458,055
9	University of Wisconsin System	11,995,591
10	Indiana University	11,260,449
11	Princeton University	10,510,491
12	University of Texas at Austin	10,102,977
13	Cornell University	10,075,313
14	Ohio State University	9,842,514
15	University of Iowa	9,827,159
16	University of Washington	9,772,809
17	University of North Carolina at Chapel Hill	9,555,566
18	Pennsylvania State University	9,481,893
19	Duke University	9,046,010
20	New York University	8,935,822

== See also ==
- Books in the United States
- List of largest libraries in the United States
- List of libraries in the United States
