= CCIT =

CCIT may refer to:

== Education ==
- Chung Cheng Institute of Technology, National Defense University, Republic of China (Taiwan) (Chinese name is 國防大學理工學院)
- Changchun Institute of Technology, a provincial public undergraduate college in Changchun, Jilin, China
- Chin Christian Institute of Theology, in Falam, Chin State, Myanmar

== Organizations ==
- California Center for Innovative Transportation, a defunct research center at the University of California, Berkeley
- Chamber of Commerce and Industry of Turkmenistan, a nonprofit in Turkmenistan

== Politics ==
- Chief Commissioner of Income Tax, a government agency in India
- Comprehensive Convention on International Terrorism, a proposed treaty to criminalize international terrorism
