= Institute of Transportation Studies =

US research center

Coordinates: 37°52′24″N 122°15′37″W

The Institute of Transportation Studies (ITS) at the University of California's Berkeley, Davis, Irvine, and Los Angeles campuses are centers for research, education, and scholarship in the fields of transportation planning and engineering. Faculty members, staff researchers, and graduate students comprise this multidisciplinary institute network of more than 400 people, which administers an average of $20 million in research funds each year. ITS Berkeley is an organized research unit with nine affiliated organizations and an eight-member advisory council.

Two UC Berkeley academic departments, Civil and Environmental Engineering in the College of Engineering and City and Regional Planning in the College of Environmental Design, offer graduate and undergraduate courses in transportation engineering, planning, policy, economics, and technology, and confer degrees. ITS UC Irvine retains a graduate-only program, and includes faculty and students from the schools of Civil and Environmental Engineering, Economics, and Policy, Planning & Design. ITS provides a means for students to conduct research in their respective academic disciplines. Advisory council members are from the arenas of transportation, government, metropolitan planning, and academia.

The Institute of Transportation Studies was created at UC Berkeley in 1948 by the California state legislature to support the design and construction of the state's transportation system following World War II. Its original mission was "to conduct research and provide instruction to a new generation of transportation professionals" and it still serves that mission today. Alexandre Bayen is the Director.

Research partners include the Division of Research and Innovation at the California Department of Transportation, the Federal Highway Administration, and the Research and Innovative Technology Association at the United States Department of Transportation.

== Centers ==
- California Center for Innovative Transportation (CCIT)
- California Partners for Advanced Transit and Highways (PATH)
- National Center of Excellence for Aviation Operations Research (NEXTOR), sponsored by the Federal Aviation Administration.
- Pavement Research Center
- Safe Transportation Research and Education Center, (formerly the Traffic Safety Center) joint venture of ITS and the School of Public Health
- Transportation Sustainability Research Center
- UC Berkeley Center for Future Urban Transport
- UC Berkeley Technology Transfer Center

== Technology Transfer Program ==
The Technology Transfer Program is a division of the Institute of Transportation Studies at the University of California, Berkeley. Tech Transfer brings together transportation research and practice—in planning, design, operations, and maintenance—through education, technical help, field training, and a variety of other resources. Many free and low-cost services are available to California cities, counties, and other public services. Laura Melendy is the current director.

== See also ==
- California Center for Innovative Transportation
- California Partners for Advanced Transit and Highways (PATH)
- National Center of Excellence for Aviation Operators (NEXTOR)
- Technology Transfer Program
- Transportation Library, UC Berkeley

== Sources ==
- Michael Cassidy, Professor, Civil and Environmental Engineering, UC Berkeley Institute of Transportation Studies
- Steven Campbell, Assistant Director, UC Berkeley Institute of Transportation Studies
- College of Engineering, University of California, Berkeley
- College of Environmental Design, University of California, Berkeley
- Larry Orcutt, Director, Division of Research and Innovation, Caltrans
