= List of New Testament minuscules (2301–2400) =

A New Testament minuscule is a copy of a portion of the New Testament written in a small, cursive Greek script (developed from Uncial).

== Legend ==
- The numbers (#) are the now standard system of Caspar René Gregory, often referred to as the Gregory-Aland numbers.
- Included among the cataloged minuscules are the following types of manuscripts, color coded:

Grey represents continuous text manuscripts containing only New Testament portions
Beige represents manuscripts with New Testament portions and a catena (quotations from church fathers)
Light cyan represents manuscripts of single-author commentaries who included the full Scripture text.
Light red represents manuscripts of single-author commentaries who included both the full Scripture text and a catena.
Light purple represents manuscripts of commentaries where the Scripture text was abridged.
White represents manuscript numbers no longer in use.

- Dates are estimated to the nearest 100 year increment where specific date is unknown.
- Content generally only describes sections of the New Testament: Gospels, The Acts of the Apostles (Acts), Pauline epistles, and so on. Sometimes the surviving portion of a codex is so limited that specific books, chapters or even verses can be indicated. Linked articles, where they exist, generally specify content in detail, by verse.
- Digital images are referenced with direct links to the hosting web pages, with the exception of those at the INTF. The quality and accessibility of the images is as follows:

Gold color indicates high resolution color images available online.
Tan color indicates high resolution color images available locally, not online.
Light tan color indicates only a small fraction of manuscript pages with color images available online.
Light gray color indicates black/white or microfilm images available online.
Light blue color indicates manuscript not imaged, and is currently lost or ownership unknown.
Light pink color indicates manuscript destroyed, presumed destroyed, or deemed too fragile to digitize.
Violet color indicates high resolution ultraviolet images available online.

† Indicates the manuscript has damaged or missing pages.
^{P} Indicates only a portion of the books were included.
^{K} Indicates manuscript also includes a commentary.
^{S} Indicates lost portions of manuscript replaced via supplement of a later hand.
^{abs} (abschrift) Indicates manuscript is copy.
[ ] Brackets around Gregory-Aland number indicate the manuscript belongs to an already numbered manuscript, was found to not be a continuous text manuscript, was found to be written in modern Greek versus Koine Greek, was proved a forgery, or has been destroyed.

== Minuscules 2301-2400 ==
#	Date	Contents	Pages	Institution and refs.	City, State	Country	Images
2301	1573	Gospels	354	Byzantine and Christian Museum, BXM 10	Athens	Greece	CSNTM
2301	1573	Gospels	354	Byzantine and Christian Museum, BXM 10	Athens	Greece	INTF
2302	15th	Andreas of Caesarea Commentary on Revelation†	71	Library of the Greek Orthodox Patriarchate, Saba 537	Jerusalem		LOC, INTF, CSNTM
2303	14th	Acts†, James†, 1 Peter†	23	Library of the Greek Orthodox Patriarchate, Saba 605, fol. 1-15; Saba 617, fol. 1-8	Jerusalem		LOC, LOC, CSNTM
2304	13th	Gospels†	234	Lutheran School of Theology at Chicago, Gruber Ms. 50	Maywood, IL	United States	CSNTM, INTF
2305	14th	Andreas of Caesarea Commentary on Revelation	28	Vatopedi Monastery, 659, fol. 146-173	Mount Athos	Greece	INTF
2306	12th	Matthew†	8	Vatopedi Monastery, 889, p. 1-16	Mount Athos	Greece	INTF
2307	11th	Matthew†, John†	116	Vatopedi Monastery, 2547	Mount Athos	Greece	INTF
2308	11th	Gospels†	252	Humboldt University of Berlin, Kriegsverlust	Berlin	Germany	
2309	14th	Mark†, Luke†, John†	120	Vatopedi Monastery, 893	Mount Athos	Greece	INTF
2310	14th	Gospels, Acts†, Pauline Epistles†, General Epistles†	158	Vatopedi Monastery, 867	Mount Athos	Greece	INTF
2311	12th	Luke†, John†	2	The Russian National Library Academy of Science, K'pel 85	Saint Petersburg	Russia	INTF
2311	12th	Luke†, John†	95	University of Notre Dame, Hesburgh Library, MS Graec. a.2	South Bend, IN	United States	INTF
[2312]=1435							
2313	11th	John† 6:44-8:35	4	Hellenic Parliament Library, HPL 2551	Athens	Greece	CSNTM
2313	11th	John† 6:44-8:35	4	Hellenic Parliament Library, HPL 2551	Athens	Greece	INTF
2314	12th	Gospels	328	Romanian Academy, Ms. Gr. 94 (Litzica 311)	Bucharest	Romania	INTF
2315	12th	Gospels	207	Romanian Academy, Ms. Gr. 665 (Litzica 312)	Bucharest	Romania	INTF
2316	14th	Gospels	120	Romanian Academy, Ms. Gr. 360 (Litz 313)	Bucharest	Romania	INTF
2317	1742	Gospels	195	Romanian Academy, 317 (695)	Bucharest	Romania	INTF
2318	18th	Pauline Epistles†, General Epistles†	409	Romanian Academy, 318 (234)	Bucharest	Romania	INTF
[2319]							
[2320]							
2321	11th	Gospels	263	University of Toronto Libraries: Thomas Fisher Rare Book Library, fisher2:131	Toronto	Canada	TFRBL
2321	11th	Gospels	263	University of Toronto Libraries: Thomas Fisher Rare Book Library, fisher2:131	Toronto	Canada	INTF
2322	12th-13th	Gospels †	263	University of Texas Harry Ransom Humanities Research Center, Ms. Gr. 1	Austin, TX	United States	HRHRC
2322	12th-13th	Gospels †	263	University of Texas Harry Ransom Humanities Research Center, Ms. Gr. 1	Austin, TX	United States	INTF
2323	13th	Gospels†, Revelation†	311	Benaki Museum, MS 46	Athens	Greece	CSNTM, INTF
2324	10th	Gospels†	346	Yale University Library, Beinecke MS 1145	New Haven, CT	United States	YUL
2324	10th	Gospels†	346	Yale University Library, Beinecke MS 1145	New Haven, CT	United States	INTF
[2325]							
2326	16th	Gospels†	194	Drew University, Ms. 10	Madison, NJ	United States	CSNTM
[2327]=1359							
2328	12th	Gospels	287	National Library, Supplement Grec 1316	Paris	France	BnF, INTF
2329	10th	Revelation	36	Great Meteoron Monastery, 573, fol. 210-245r	Meteora	Greece	INTF
[2330]							
[2331]							
[2332]							
[2333]=1810							
[2334]=1811							
[2335]=1802							
[2336]=1803							
[2337]							
[2338]							
[2339]							
[2340]							
[2341]							
[2342]							
[2343]=2375							
2344	11th	Acts, General Epistles, Pauline epistles, Revelation	61	National Library, Coislin 18, fol. 170-230	Paris	France	BnF, INTF
2345	14th	Matthew†	2	Library of the Greek Orthodox Patriarchate, Nea Syllogi (Photiu), 59d	Jerusalem		INTF
2346	12th	Gospels†	273	Owner Unknown, Formerly Charles Ryrie			CSNTM
2346	12th	Gospels†	273	Owner Unknown, Formerly Charles Ryrie			INTF
[2347]=1701							
[2348]=2098							
[2349]=905							
2350	17th	Oecumenius Commentary on Revelation	27	Turin National University Library, B.I.15	Turin	Italy	INTF
2351	10th	Revelation 1:1-14:5†	45	Great Meteoron Monastery, 573, fol. 245v-290	Meteora	Greece	INTF
2352	15th	New Testament	389	Great Meteoron Monastery, 237	Meteora	Greece	INTF
2353	13th	Matthew†, Mark†	20	University of Michigan, MS 4	Ann Arbor, MI	United States	CSNTM
2353	13th	Matthew†, Mark†	20	University of Michigan, MS 4	Ann Arbor, MI	United States	INTF
2354	1287	Gospels	133	University of Michigan, MS 80	Ann Arbor, MI	United States	CSNTM
2354	1287	Gospels	133	University of Michigan, MS 80	Ann Arbor, MI	United States	INTF
2355	14th	Gospels	296	Saint Catherine's Monastery, Gr. 1591	Sinai	Egypt	LOC, INTF, CSNTM
2356	14th	Gospels, Acts, Pauline Epistles, General Epistles	415	Saint Catherine's Monastery, Gr. 1594	Sinai	Egypt	LOC, INTF, CSNTM
2357	14th	General Epistles†, Pauline Epistles†	16	Library of the Greek Orthodox Patriarchate, Photiu 48	Jerusalem		INTF
2358	12th	Gospels†	175	Southern Baptist Theological Seminary	Louisville, KY	United States	CSNTM
2358	12th	Gospels†	175	Southern Baptist Theological Seminary	Louisville, KY	United States	INTF
2359	15th-16th	John^{P} 1:1-17	2	Vatican Library, Barb.gr.372, fol. 3v. 4r	Vatican City	Vatican City	DVL
2359	15th-16th	John^{P} 1:1-17	2	Vatican Library, Barb.gr.372, fol. 3v. 4r	Vatican City	Vatican City	INTF
2360	11th	Matthew†	4	Herzog August Library, Codd. Gud. Graec. 112, fol. 138/141. 144/149	Wolfenbüttel	Germany	
2361	16th	Andreas of Caesarea Commentary on Revelation 4:10-5:6; 6:17-7:2†	2	Vatican Library, Vat.gr.1205, fol. 144.145	Vatican City	Vatican City	DVL, INTF
2362	14th	Gospels	376	Library of the Serail, 125	Istanbul	Turkey	INTF
2363	11th	Luke†	1	University of Michigan, Ms. 12	Ann Arbor, MI	United States	INTF
2364	12th-13th	Gospels	492	University of Michigan, MS 182	Ann Arbor, MI	United States	CSNTM, INTF
2365	12th	Matthew†	2	University of Michigan, MS 173e	Ann Arbor, MI	United States	CSNTM
2365	12th	Matthew†	2	University of Michigan, MS 173e	Ann Arbor, MI	United States	INTF
[2366]=895							
2367	12th	Gospels	181	Princeton University Library, Garrett MS. 4	Princeton, NJ	United States	INTF
2368	10th-11th	Gospels†	1	Docheiariou Monastery, 56	Mount Athos	Greece	INTF
2368	10th-11th	Gospels†	135	Walters Art Museum, Ms. W. 527	Baltimore, MD	United States	WAM, INTF
2369	10th	Gospels	335	Walters Art Museum, Ms. W. 523	Baltimore, MD	United States	WAM, INTF
2370	11th	Gospels	291	Walters Art Museum, Ms. W. 522	Baltimore, MD	United States	WAM, INTF
[2371]=647							
2372	13th	Gospels†	234	Walters Art Museum, Ms. W. 528	Baltimore, MD	United States	WAM, INTF
2373	10th	Gospels through John 6:8†	254	Walters Art Museum, Ms. W. 524	Baltimore, MD	United States	WAM, INTF
2374	13th-14th	Gospels, Acts, Pauline Epistles, General Epistles	252	Walters Art Museum, Ms. W. 525	Baltimore, MD	United States	WAM, INTF
2375	12th	Gospels	233	Walters Art Museum, Ms. W. 531	Baltimore, MD	United States	WAM, INTF
2376	13th	Matthew†, Mark†, Luke†	171	Byzantine and Christian Museum, 83	Athens	Greece	INTF
2377	14th	Revelation 13:10-14:4; 19:21-22:20†	10	Byzantine and Christian Museum, MS 117 (fol. 1–10)	Athens	Greece	CSNTM
2378	16th	Acts †, General Epistles †, Pauline Epistles †	234	Byzantine and Christian Museum, BXM 19705	Athens	Greece	CSNTM
[2379] = ℓ 2004							
2380	13th	Mark†	8	General Theological Seminary, Ms. 4, in G. W. Case	New York, NY	United States	INTF
2381	11th	Gospels	428	Museum of Art, Acc. 42. 152	Cleveland, OH	United States	CMA
2382	12th	Gospels	309	The Morgan Library & Museum, MS M.340	New York, NY	United States	MLAM
2382	12th	Gospels	ca. 360	Dousikou Monastery, 4	Trikala	Greece	INTF
2383	13th-14th	Gospels†	220	The Morgan Library & Museum, MS M.378	New York, NY	United States	MLAM
[2384]= ℓ 1030							
[2385]	11th	Palimpsest Septuagint fragments	96	The Morgan Library & Museum, MS M.745	New York, NY	United States	INTF
2386	11th	Gospels	195	The Morgan Library & Museum, MS M.748	New York, NY	United States	MLAM
2386	11th	Gospels	1	Princeton University The Art Museum, 32-14	Princeton, NJ	United States	INTF
2387	14th	Gospels	252	National Library, Supplement Grec 1356	Paris	France	BnF
2388	12th	Gospels	230	Lutheran School of Theology at Chicago, Gruber 121	Maywood, IL	United States	CSNTM, INTF
2389	11th-12th	Mark, Luke, John	201	Lutheran School of Theology at Chicago, Gruber 119, 120, 54	Maywood, IL	United States	CSNTM, INTF
2390	13th	Matthew, Mark, Luke	161	National Library, Supplement Grec 1341	Paris	France	BnF
2391	12th	Luke†	6	National Library, Supplement Grec 1355 I, fol. 1-6	Paris	France	BnF
2392	12th	Matthew†, Luke†, John†	13	National Library, Supplement Grec 1355 II, fol. 7-19	Paris	France	BnF
[2393]=1826							
2394	13th	Gospels	400	The University of Chicago Library, Ms. 131 (Goodspeed)	Chicago, IL	United States	TUOCL
2395	13th	Theophylact Commentary on the Gospels†	332	Panagia Zourva Monastery	Hydra	Greece	
2396	12th	Gospels	165	The University of Chicago Library, Ms. 133 (Goodspeed)	Chicago, IL	United States	TUOCL
2396	12th	Gospels	165	The University of Chicago Library, Ms. 133 (Goodspeed)	Chicago, IL	United States	INTF
2397	14th	Gospels	341	The University of Chicago Library, Ms. 135 (Goodspeed)	Chicago, IL	United States	TUOCL
2398	14th	Gospels†	1	Diocesan Theological College, Ms. B	Montreal	Canada	INTF
2398	14th	Gospels†	206	The University of Chicago Library, Ms. 132 (Goodspeed)	Chicago, IL	United States	TUOCL
2398	14th	Gospels†	206	The University of Chicago Library, Ms. 132 (Goodspeed)	Chicago, IL	United States	INTF
2399	14th	Gospels†	203	The University of Chicago Library, Ms. 137 (Goodspeed)	Chicago, IL	United States	TUOCL, INTF
2400	13th	Gospels†, Acts†, Pauline Epistles†, General Epistles†	207	The University of Chicago Library, Ms. 965 (Goodspeed)	Chicago, IL	United States	TUOCL
2400	13th	Gospels†, Acts†, Pauline Epistles†, General Epistles†	207	The University of Chicago Library, Ms. 965 (Goodspeed)	Chicago, IL	United States	INTF

[top]

== See also ==
- List of New Testament papyri
- List of New Testament uncials
- List of New Testament minuscules (1–1000)
- List of New Testament minuscules (1001–2000)
- List of New Testament minuscules (2001–)
- List of New Testament minuscules ordered by Location/Institution
- List of New Testament lectionaries

== Bibliography ==
- Aland, Kurt; M. Welte; B. Köster; K. Junack (1994). Kurzgefasste Liste der griechischen Handschriften des Neues Testaments. Berlin, New York: Walter de Gruyter. p. 95. ISBN 3-11-011986-2.
- "Liste Handschriften". Münster: Institute for New Testament Textual Research.
