= National Center of Excellence in Aviation Operations Research =

Aviation research institute in California

The National Center of Excellence in Aviation Operations Research (NEXTOR), is part of a national alliance of research institutes with centers dedicated to the advancement of new ideas, the training of professionals, and the growth of knowledge in the field of aviation operations.

Nextor was established in 1996 by the Federal Aviation Administration (FAA) as a collaboration between academia, government, and private industry. It comprises five university centers of excellence, government partners, and industry partners. It offers conferences and research to advance its mission of education and growth of knowledge in the field.

The NEXTOR administrative offices are located at the center of excellence at University of California, Berkeley, as part of the Institute of Transportation Studies. Other centers of excellence are located at Massachusetts Institute of Technology, University of Maryland, College Park, Virginia Polytechnical Institute and State University (Virginia Tech), and George Mason University.

Each NEXTOR university center has its own director:

- Michael Ball, Ph.D., University of Maryland at College Park
- Arnold Barnett, Massachusetts Institute of Technology
- Mark Hansen, Ph.D., UC Berkeley
- Lance Sherry, Ph.D., George Mason University
- Antonio Trani, Virginia Tech

== See also ==
- Transportation Library, UC Berkeley
