= Biogeographia =

- Discipline: Biogeography
- Language: English
- Edited by: Diego Fontaneto

Publication details
- Former name: Lavori della Società Italiana di Biogeografia
- History: 1970–present
- Publisher: eScholarship Publishing University of California (United States)
- Open access: Yes
- License: Creative Commons Attribution License

Standard abbreviations
- ISO 4: Biogeographia

Indexing
- ISSN: 1594-7629 (print); 2475-5257 (web)

Links
- Journal homepage

Biogeographia: The Journal of Integrative Biogeography is a peer-reviewed open access scientific journal publishing original research and reviews in biogeography since 1970. It is published on behalf of the Italian Biogeography Society (Società Italiana di Biogeografia), using the eScholarship Publishing platform. The current editor-in-chief is Diego Fontaneto.

== Abstracting and indexing ==
The journal is abstracted and indexed in:

- Scopus
- DOAJ
- Zoological Record
- Scimago
- Google Scholar

== Notable articles ==
The four most highly cited papers with more than 150 citations by the end of 2020 are:

- Vigna Taglianti, Augusto; Audisio, Paolo, A.; Biondi, Maurizio; Bologna, Marco, A.; Carpaneto, Giuseppe, M.; De Biase, Alessio; Fattorini, Simone; Piattella, Emanuele; Sindaco, Roberto; Venchi, Alberto; Zapparoli, Marzio (1999). "A proposal for a chorotype classification of the Near East fauna, in the framework of the Western Palearctic region". Biogeographia. 20: 31–59. doi:10.21426/B6110172.
- Halffter, Gonzalo (1991). "Historical and ecological factors determining the geographical distribution of beetles (Coleoptera: Scarabaeidae: Scarabaeinae)". Biogeographia. 15: 11–40. doi:10.21426/B615110376.
- Vigna Taglianti, Augusto; Audisio, Paolo, Aldo; Belfiore, Carlo; Biondi, Maurizio; Bologna, Marco, Alberto; Carpaneto, Giuseppe, Maria; De Biase, Alessio; De Felici, Stefano; Piattella, Emanuele; Racheli, Tommaso; Zapparoli, Marzio; Zoia, Stefano (1992). "Riflessioni di gruppo sui corotipi fondamentali della fauna W-paleartica ed in particolare italiana". Biogeographia. 16: 159–179. doi:10.21426/B616110375.
- Sindaco, Roberto; Venchi, Alberto; Carpaneto, Giuseppe, M.; Bologna, Marco, A. (2000). "The reptiles of Anatolia: a checklist and zoogeographical analysis". Biogeographia. 21: 441–554. doi:10.21426/B6110017.

The three most downloaded papers with more than 1000 views by the end of 2020 are:

- Halffter, Gonzalo (1991). "Historical and ecological factors determining the geographical distribution of beetles (Coleoptera: Scarabaeidae: Scarabaeinae)". Biogeographia. 15: 11–40. doi:10.21426/B615110376.
- Amori, Giovanni; Castiglia, Riccardo (2018). "Mammal endemism in Italy: a review". Biogeographia. 33: 19–31. doi:10.21426/B633035335. hdl:11573/1120982.
- Bianchi, Carlo, Nike; Morri, Carla (2003). "Global sea warming and "tropicalization" of the Mediterranean Sea: biogeographic and ecological aspects". Biogeographia. 24: 319–327. doi:10.21426/B6110129.
