= California Digital Library =

Digital library founded in 1997 by UC system

The California Digital Library (CDL) was founded by the University of California in 1997. Under the leadership of then UC President Richard C. Atkinson, the CDL's original mission was to create a better system for scholarly information management and improved support for teaching and research. In collaboration with the ten University of California Libraries and other partners, CDL assembled one of the world's largest digital research libraries. CDL facilitates the licensing of online materials and develops shared services used throughout the UC system. Building on the foundations of the Melvyl Catalog (UC's union catalog), CDL has developed one of the largest online library catalogs in the country and works in partnership with the UC campuses to bring the contents of California's libraries, museums, and cultural heritage organizations to the world. CDL continues to explore how services such as digital curation, scholarly publishing, archiving and preservation support research throughout the information lifecycle.

== History ==
The California Digital Library (CDL) is the eleventh library for the University of California (UC). A collaborative effort of the ten campuses, organizationally housed at the University of California Office of the President, it is responsible for the design, creation, and implementation of systems that support the shared collections of the University of California. Several CDL projects focus on collaboration with other California Universities and organizations to create and extend access to digital material to UC partners and to the public at large.

The CDL was created as the result of a three-year planning process, beginning with the Digital Library Executive Working Group commissioned by Library Council and culminating with the Library Planning and Action Initiative commissioned by the Provost, which involved UC faculty, librarians, and administrators.

On February 7, 2012, CDL partnered with the Public Knowledge Project (PKP), joining several other institutions including Stanford University School of Education and the Faculty of Education at the University of British Columbia, Vancouver. As one of PKP's first official development partners, CDL undertook a review of PKP's Open Journal System, analyzing journal setup, article submission and review, account set up, and publication processes.

Since late 2022, CDL has been based on the 10th floor of the Key at 12th (1100 Broadway) office tower in Oakland, California.

== Publishing, Archives, and Digitization ==
The Publishing, Archives, and Digitization group, comprising the Publishing and Digital Special Collections (DSC) teams, develops and maintains production services to enable access to the digital assets of the University of California.

=== eScholarship ===
eScholarship is a suite of open access scholarly publishing services and research tools that enable UC departments, research units, publishing programs, and individual scholars to have direct control over the creation and dissemination of their scholarship. The eScholarship program provides e-print repositories where submissions can be made using a standard web browser. Tools are available to help submit, review, find, and use scholarly information. The program also allows for new monographs and journals to be created using existing articles within the repository. Currently, the repository houses more than 200,000 scholarly works from 10 disciplines: Social and Behavioral Sciences, Life Sciences, Physical Sciences and Mathematics, Engineering, Medicine and Health Sciences, Arts and Humanities, Education, Law, Business, and Architecture.

=== Online Archive of California (OAC) ===
The Online Archive of California (OAC), a finding aids database for archival institutions, provides free public access to primary sources, including manuscripts, photographs, artwork, scientific data, through more than 38,000 collection guides and 200,000 digitized images and documents.

=== Calisphere ===
Calisphere is a free website that offers educators, students, and the public access to more than one million primary sources such as photographs, documents, newspapers, political cartoons, works of art, diaries, transcribed oral histories, and other cultural artifacts. These materials reveal the history and culture of California and its role in national and world history. CDL digital collections, plus the collections of over 100 libraries and institutions, can be accessed through this site with the primary purpose of providing free access to historically significant and unique items. Calisphere was launched in 2006.

== Collection Development and Management ==
The Collection Development and Management Program oversees and coordinates shared library collections on behalf of the ten University of California campuses. The program acquires scholarly content, manages UC's mass digitization efforts, organizes and supports shared physical library collections, and is responsible for the system-wide negotiation and licensing of shared digital materials for the UC libraries.

=== Licensed Resources ===
These are the electronic journals, databases, ebooks and other e-resources licensed by CDL on behalf of and in coordination with the ten UC campuses.

=== Shared Print ===
The University of California Libraries' shared print collections consist of information resources jointly purchased or electively contributed by the libraries. Such resources are collectively governed and managed by the University Librarians.

=== Mass Digitization ===
The UC Libraries are digitizing millions of books from their collections through participation in mass digitization projects with Google, the Internet Archive, and the HathiTrust Digital Library.

=== Shared Cataloging ===
The Shared Cataloging Program (SCP) provides catalog records for the University of California campus libraries. Established in January 2000, the program is based at UC San Diego.

== Discovery & Delivery ==
The focus of the CDL's Discovery and Delivery team is the integration of library services and resources in order to remove barriers between users and content. The goal is to connect faculty, students, and staff with access to the University of California libraries' extensive research collections and beyond to the world's libraries.

=== AGUA ===
AGUA provides key collection data to the Western Regional Storage Trust (WEST) and UC Libraries Shared Print Initiative.

=== Resource Sharing ===
Resource Sharing facilitates consortial borrowing and interlibrary loan from beyond the UC system for UC faculty, students, and staff.

=== UC Library Search ===
UC Library Search is the primary discovery service for the collections of the UC Libraries.

=== Zephir ===
Zephir ingests, stores, and manages bibliographic metadata for HathiTrust.

== UC Curation Center (UC3) ==
UC3 helps researchers and the UC libraries manage, preserve, and provide access to their important digital assets.

=== Merritt Repository Service ===
Merritt is a repository service from the University of California Curation Center (UC3) that lets the UC community manage, archive, and share its digital content.

=== EZID ===
EZID (easy-eye-dee) creates and manages unique, persistent identifiers for UC researchers. The service currently uses digital object identifiers (DOIs) and Archival Resource Keys (ARKs), which can be provided prior to publication and aid in linking related datasets and articles.

=== DMPTool ===
DMPTool helps researchers create and manage data management plans. It provides templates that researchers can customize based on their funding source and partner institutions. It has been noted that the DMPTool is of more use when planning funding applications than in stewarding the data through its lifecycle.

== See also ==
- List of online image archives
- DataCite
- Digital curation
- Digital library
- Digital preservation
- National Digital Library Program (NDLP)
- National Digital Information Infrastructure and Preservation Program (NDIIPP)
- Google Books Library Project
