= University of California Libraries =

U.S. academic library system

The University of California Libraries is the umbrella term for all libraries at the ten campuses of the University of California system. Each campus in the University of California system manages and operates its own libraries, while all campuses share a unified, systemwide catalog known as "UC Library Search".

Historically, each campus maintained its own library catalog and simultaneously participated in the systemwide union catalog, Melvyl. On July 27, 2021, all ten campuses went live with UC Library Search, a unified systemwide library catalog based on the Ex Libris Alma/Primo platform. As of 2019, it has 40.8 million print volumes in the combined collection throughout the University of California's ten campuses.

== List of collections by campus ==
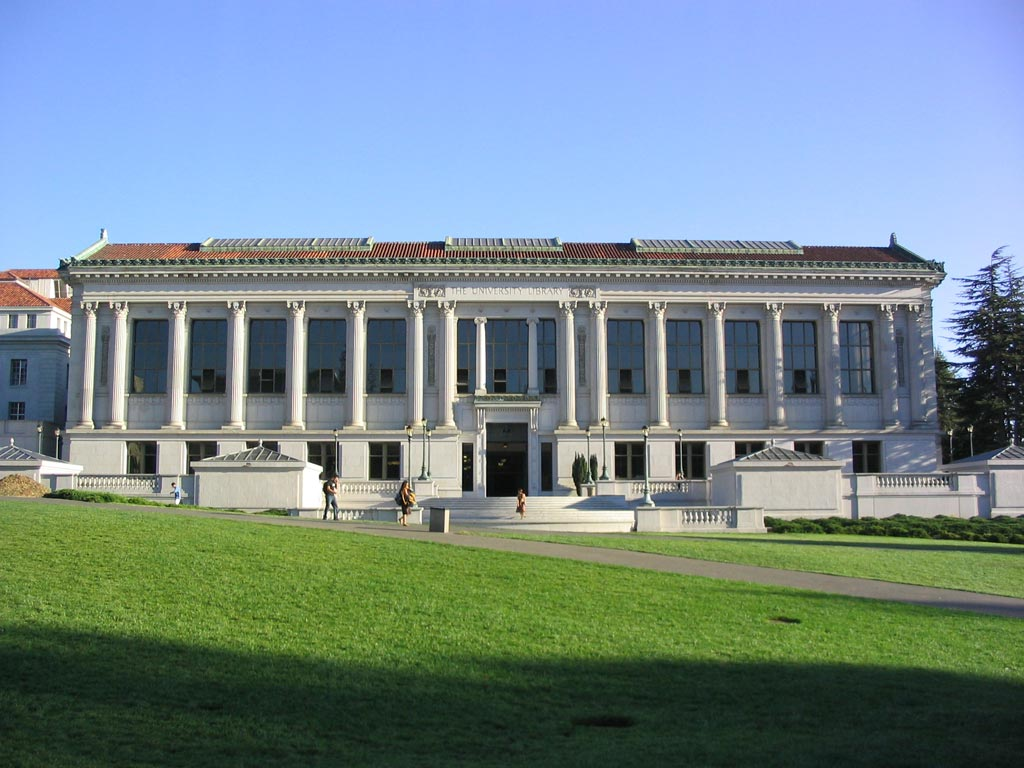
Doe Memorial Library, Berkeley

=== Berkeley (18 university libraries and 11 affiliated libraries—including Law) ===
- Doe Memorial Library (Main Collections and Main Stacks)
- Moffitt Library (Undergraduate)
- Bancroft Library (Special Collections)
- Hargrove Music Library

=== Davis (3 major libraries—including Law and Medical) ===
- Peter J. Shields Library (Main Collections)
- Blaisdell Medical Library (Sacramento)
- Mabie Law Library (Davis)

=== Irvine (4 major libraries—including Medical) ===
- Langson Library (Main Collections)
- Science Library (Science and Biomedical Fields)
- Grunigen Medical Library (Medical)
- Law Library
- Gateway Study Center

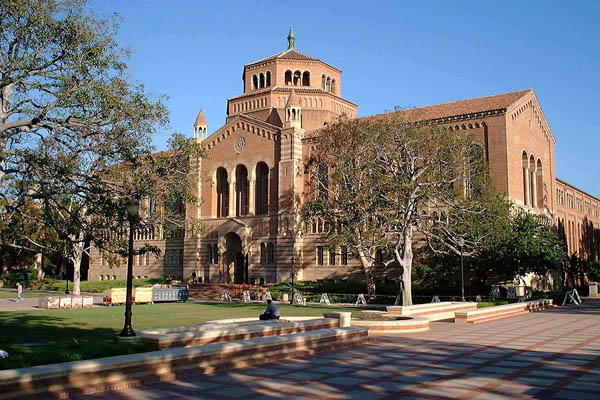
Powell Library, UCLA

=== Los Angeles (13 major libraries—including Law and Medical) ===
- American Indian Studies Center Library
- Arts Library
- Asian American Studies Center Library/Reading Room
- Charles E. Young Research Library (Humanities and Social Sciences)
- Chicano Studies Research Center Library
- Ethnomusciology Archive
- Eugene and Maxine Rosenfeld Management Library
- Gonda Elementary Library (Library of affiliated elementary school, UCLA Lab School)
- Grace M. Hunt Memorial English Reading Room
- Hugh & Hazel Darling Law Library
- Powell Library (Undergraduate Collections)
- Louise M. Darling Biomedical Library
- Library Special Collections
- Music Library
- Ralph J. Bunche Center for African American Studies Library and Media Center
- Richard C. Rudolph East Asian Library
- Science and Engineering Library
- Social Science Data Archive
- UCLA Film and Television Archive
- William Andrews Clark Memorial Library

=== Merced ===
- Kolligian Library (Main Collections)

=== Riverside ===
- Tomas Rivera Library (Main Collections)
- Orbach Science Library (Science Fields)

=== San Diego ===
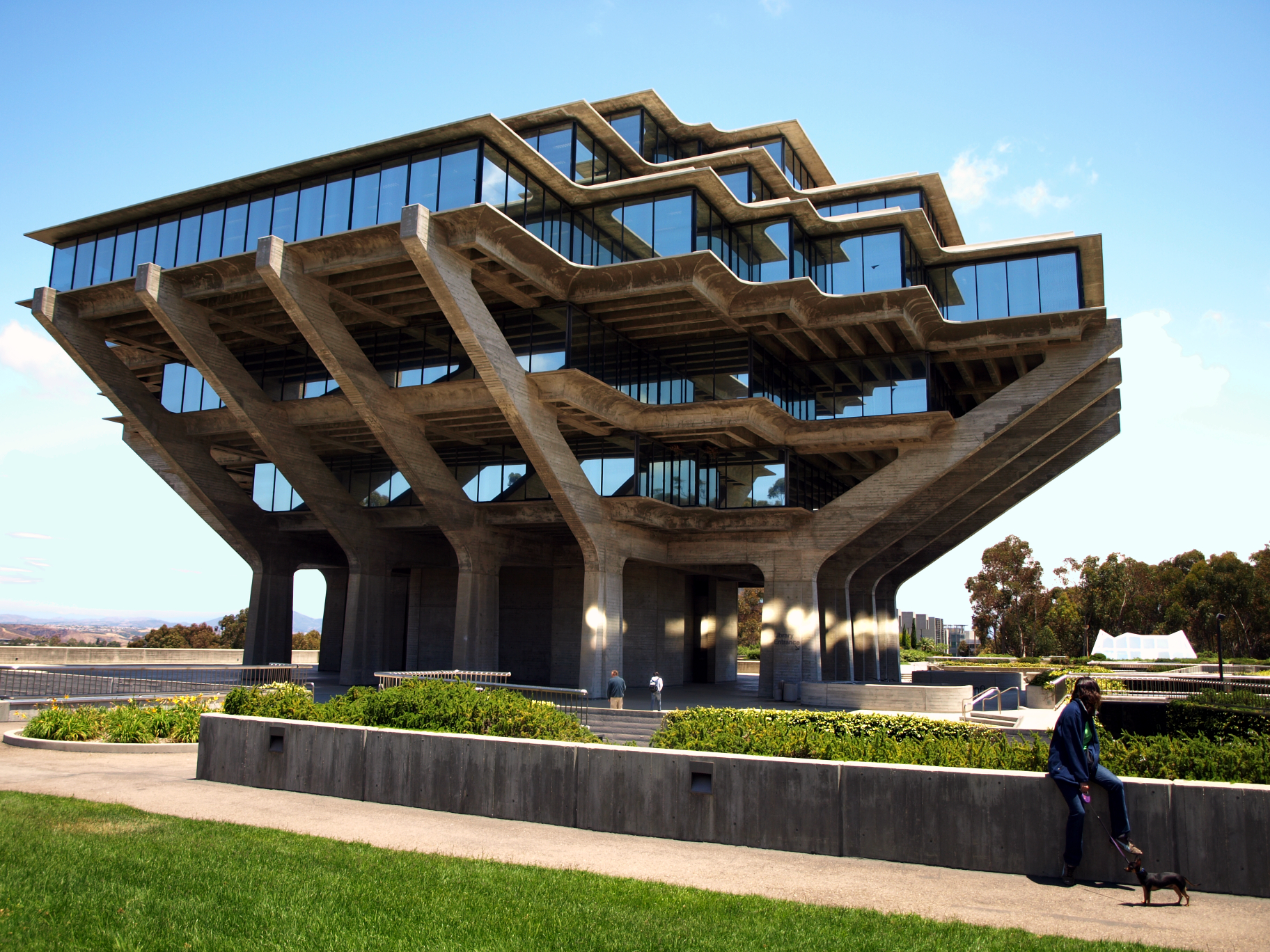
Geisel Library at UCSD

- Geisel Library (Main Collections)
- Sally T. WongAvery Library

=== San Francisco ===
- Parnassus Campus Library (Health Sciences - Main)
- Mission Bay FAMRI Library (Health Sciences)

=== Santa Barbara ===
- Davidson Library

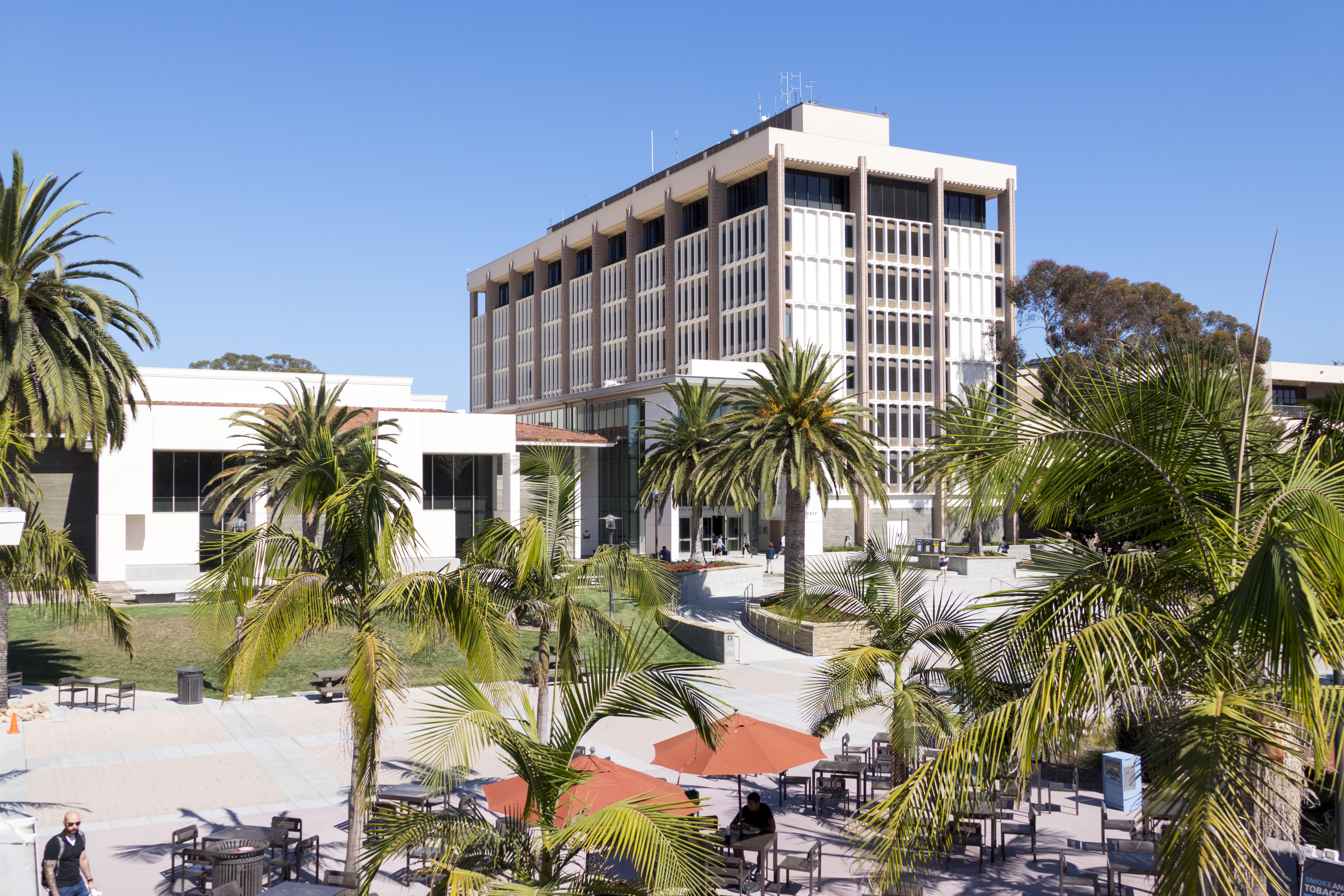
Davidson Library at UCSB

- UCSB Music Library

=== Santa Cruz ===
- McHenry Library
  - Humanities and Social Sciences
  - David Kirk Digital Scholarship Commons
  - Special Collections and Archives
  - Dead Central archives of the Grateful Dead
- Science & Engineering Library
- Jean and Bill Lane Botanical Library
- Page Smith Library, Cowell College
- Adlai E. Stevenson College Library
- Merrill College Library
- Crown College Library
- Oakes College Library

== Policies ==
The UC library system has open stacks at most libraries, and permits free research and reading by the public. In addition, all campuses allow any California resident to apply for a library card and thus gain limited borrowing privileges for libraries on that campus, although there is typically a charge for these cards.

Materials may be borrowed between the UC campus libraries or from the regional library facilities through interlibrary loan; it is generally possible for a student or other university associate to order a nonfragile, unreserved item and have it within a few days. Books may take between a day to a week to be delivered between campuses.

== Librarians Association of the University of California ==
The Librarians Association of the University of California (LAUC) is the statewide organization of librarians employed at least half-time in the UC Library system. Each campus also supports its own division. Librarians are academic appointees but not faculty. LAUC's objectives are to: advise the university on professional and governance matters, to make recommendations concerning UC librarians’ rights, privileges, and obligations, and to promote full utilization of UC librarians’ professional abilities. LAUC also awards research grants to its members to support librarian research and professional development.
