= List of largest libraries in the United States =

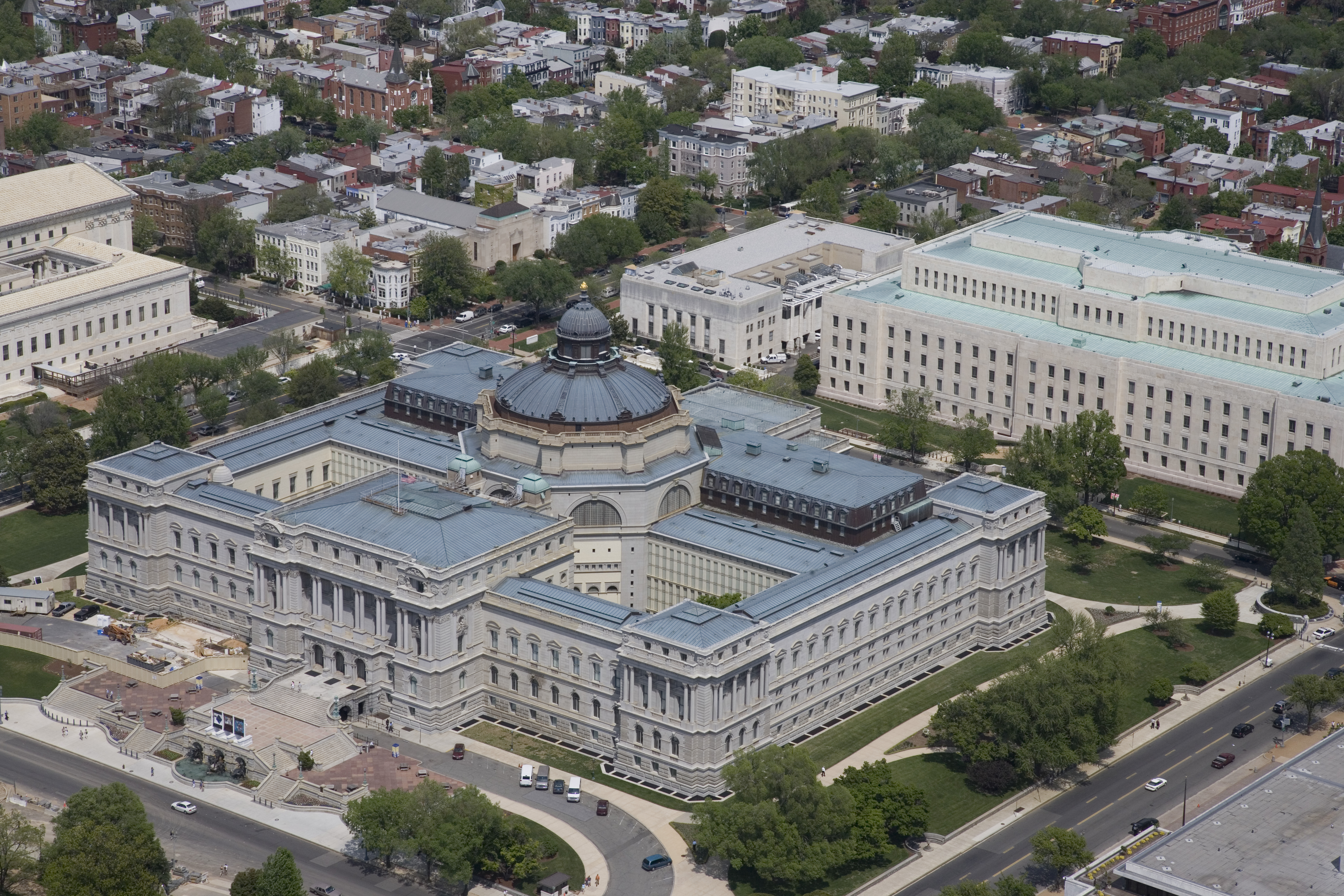
The Thomas Jefferson Building at the Library of Congress in Washington, D.C., the largest library in the United States and largest library in the world with over 167 million holdings, including 39 million books and other printed recordings, 14.8 million photographs, 5.5 million maps, 8.1 million pieces of sheet music, and 72 million manuscripts

The largest libraries in the United States is determined by the number of volumes or titles held, by circulation, including library materials checked out or renewed, or by number of library visits. As of 2018, the largest public library in the United States and largest library in the world is the Library of Congress in Washington, D.C., the de facto national library of the United States, which holds over 167 million items, including over 39 million books and other printed materials, 3.6 million recordings, 14.8 million photographs, 5.5 million maps, 8.1 million pieces of sheet music, and 72 million manuscripts. The largest research library in the United States, with nearly 20 million holdings, is the Harvard Library at Harvard University in Cambridge, Massachusetts.

Comparing the size of public libraries with research libraries, such as academic libraries, is complicated by the differing definitions of holdings or volumes used. The Association of Research Libraries uses the National Information Standards Organization definition of volume, which is, "A single physical unit of any printed, typewritten, handwritten, mimeographed, or processed work, distinguished from other units by a separate binding, encasement, portfolio, or other clear distinction, which has been cataloged, classified, and made ready for use, and which is typically the unit used to charge circulation transactions." The Public Library Data Service Statistical Report, a publication of the Public Library Association, a division of the American Library Association, defines "holdings" as "the number of cataloged items (number of items, number of titles) plus paperbacks and videocassettes even if uncataloged."

== Largest public libraries ==
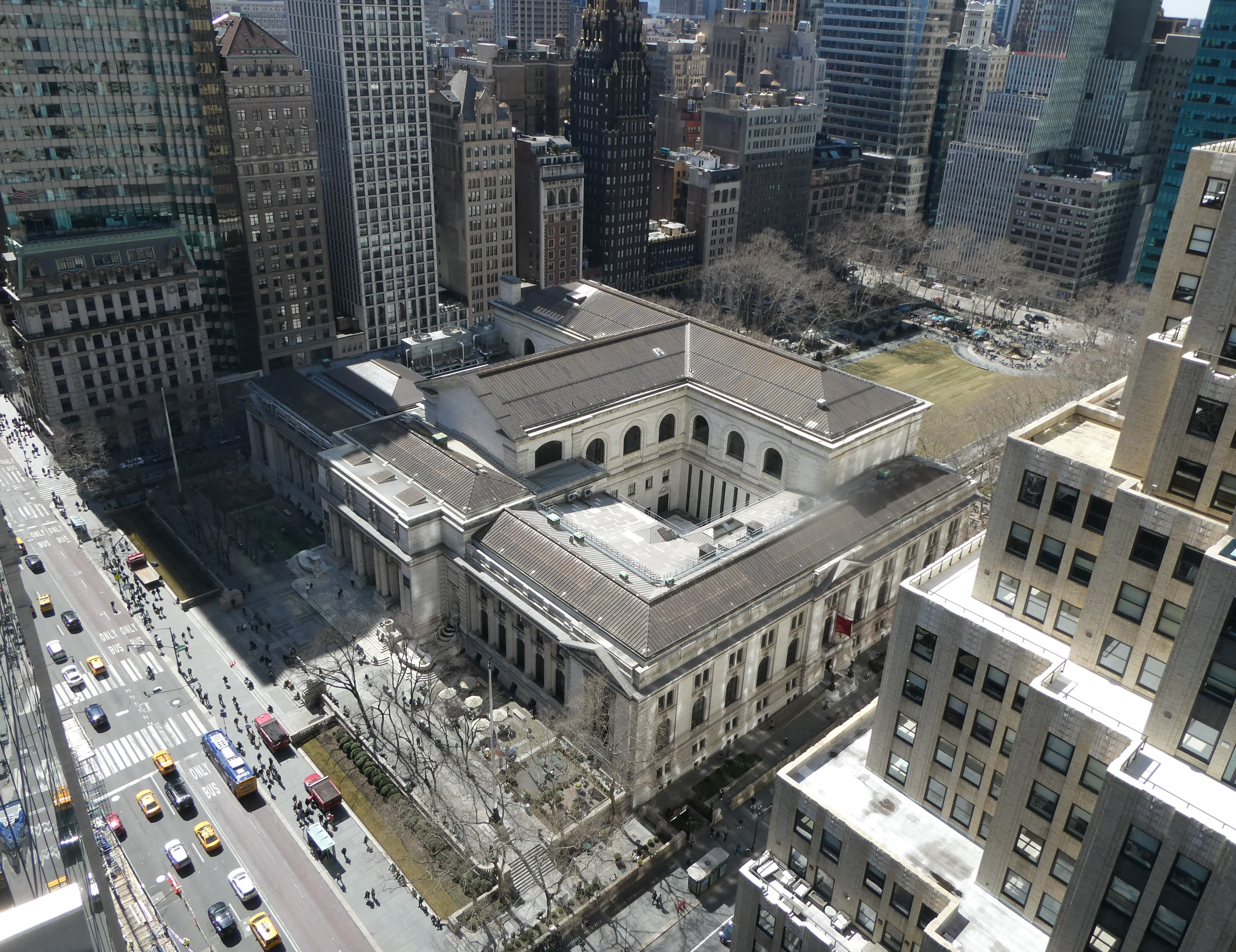
The Main Branch at New York Public Library in New York City, the nation's largest public library with over 25 million holdings

The American Library Association has published data on the size of 25 largest public libraries in the United States. These data are from the Institute of Museum and Library Services's Public Libraries Survey (PLS) for fiscal year 2016. The largest public libraries in the U.S. are far larger than the median public library in the country; almost four-fifths of U.S. public libraries serve areas with populations of fewer than 25,000.

"Total collection" consists of print material, electronic books, audio materials, and video materials, each of which is a particular "data element" defined in the PLS. Print materials include printed books, serial music, and maps, including duplicates; electronic books include digital documents include e-books and digitized documents, including duplicates; "audio materials" include both physical audio files (such as cassette tapes, audioreels, CD-ROMs, and talking books) and downloadable units; and "video materials" similarly includes both physical video materials (such as videotape and DVD) and downloadable video files.

Largest public libraries systems by total collections
Rank	Library	Area served	Total collection (FY 2016)
1	New York Public Library	Manhattan, The Bronx, and Staten Island, New York City, NY	25,271,223
2	Cincinnati and Hamilton County Public Library	Hamilton County, OH	11,721,430
3	Mid-Continent Public Library	Jackson County, Clay County, and Platte County, MO	8,970,728
4	Boston Public Library	Boston, MA	8,197,010
5	Los Angeles Public Library	Los Angeles, CA	6,735,561
6	Chicago Public Library	Chicago, IL	5,949,251
7	County of Los Angeles Public Library	Los Angeles County, CA	5,779,843
8	Queens Borough Public Library	Queens, New York City, NY	5,670,563
9	San Diego Public Library	San Diego, CA	5,272,779
10	Dallas Public Library	Dallas, TX	5,155,647
11	Hennepin County Library	Hennepin County, MN	4,895,312
12	Dayton Metro Library	Dayton, OH	4,719,674
13	Detroit Public Library	Detroit, MI	4,394,193
14	King County Library System	King County, WA	3,967,872
15	Cleveland Public Library	Cleveland, OH	3,946,416
16	Cuyahoga County Public Library	Cuyahoga County, OH	3,661,264
17	Brooklyn Public Library	Brooklyn, New York City, NY	3,660,532
18	Miami-Dade Public Library System	Miami-Dade County, FL	3,626,153
19	Allen County Public Library	Allen County, IN	2,450,882
20	Hawaii State Public Library System	Hawaii	3,403,577
21	City of St. Louis Municipal Library District	St. Louis, MO	3,281,380
22	Broward County Libraries Division	Broward County, FL	3,194,345
23	San Francisco Public Library	San Francisco, CA	3,122,259
24	Houston Public Library	Houston, TX	3,084,633
25	Las Vegas-Clark County Library District	Clark County, NV	3,041,019

== Largest research libraries ==
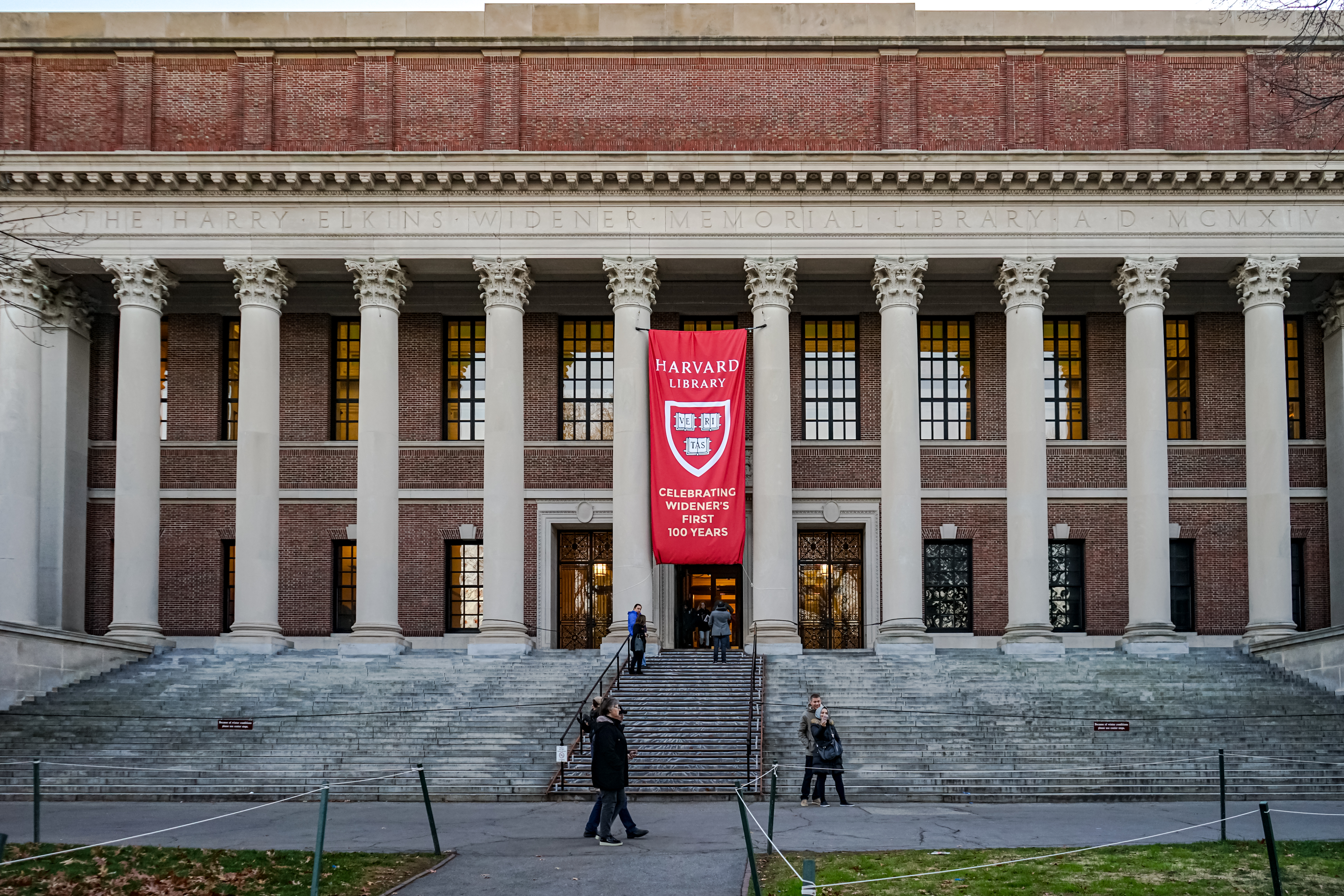
Widener Library, part of the Harvard Library at Harvard University

The Association of Research Libraries (ARL), a consortium of U.S. and Canada research libraries, reports statistical data on its 124 members (of which 114 are academic libraries within universities and 10 are non-academic research libraries). The ten non-university institutions in the ARL are the Boston Public Library, National Research Council Canada National Science Library, Center for Research Libraries, Library of Congress, National Agricultural Library, National Archives, National Library of Medicine, New York Public Library, New York State Library, and Smithsonian Libraries.

The following volume figures for the largest 20 U.S. and Canada research libraries by volume were reported in ARL Statistics, 2020, published in 2022. Some ARL member libraries include the holdings of law libraries, medical libraries, and branch campuses in their reported statistics; others do not.

=== 25 largest research libraries by volumes held ===
The following are the 25 ARL members with the largest number of volumes held. ARL uses the ANSI/NISO Z39.7-2004 definition of "volume": "a single physical unit of any printed, typewritten, handwritten, mimeographed, or processed work, distinguished from other units by a separate binding, encasement, portfolio, or other clear distinction, which has been catalogued, classified, and made ready for use." Microform, maps, and "electronic serials and other virtual serial volumes" are excluded from the volume count.

Rank	Library	Institution	Type	Volumes (2020)
1	Harvard Library	Harvard University	Private	19,608,349
2	University of Michigan Library	University of Michigan	Public	16,025,996
3	Yale University Library	Yale University	Private	15,421,200
4	University of Illinois Urbana-Champaign University Library	University of Illinois Urbana-Champaign	Public	15,385,227
5	Columbia University Libraries	Columbia University	Private	15,029,945 (Note: Columbia University Libraries is closely affiliated with the Jewish Theological Seminary Library, whose collection consists of over 400,000 volumes, but is not included in the ARL count.)
6	University of California, Berkeley Libraries	University of California, Berkeley	Public	13,890,919
7	University of Chicago Library	University of Chicago	Private	12,458,055
8	University of Wisconsin–Madison Libraries	University of Wisconsin–Madison	Public	11,995,591
9	University of California, Los Angeles Library	University of California, Los Angeles	Public	11,421,038
10	Indiana University Libraries	Indiana University	Public	11,352,115
11	Princeton University Library	Princeton University	Private	10,510,491
12	University of Texas Libraries	University of Texas at Austin	Public	10,102,977
13	Cornell University Library	Cornell University	Private	10,075,313
14	Ohio State University Libraries	Ohio State University	Public	9,842,514
15	University of Iowa Libraries	University of Iowa	Public	9,827,159
16	University of Washington Libraries	University of Washington	Public	9,772,809
17	UNC Chapel Hill Libraries	University of North Carolina at Chapel Hill	Public	9,555,566
18	Pennsylvania State University Libraries	Pennsylvania State University	Public	9,481,893
19	Duke University Libraries	Duke University	Private	9,046,010
20	New York University Libraries	New York University	Private	8,935,822
21	Penn Libraries	University of Pennsylvania	Private	8,880,872
22	Northwestern University Library	Northwestern University	Private	8,449,608
23	University of Colorado Boulder University Libraries	University of Colorado Boulder	Public	8,337,273
24	Oklahoma State University Libraries	Oklahoma State University System	Public	8,012,463
25	Michigan State University Libraries	Michigan State University	Public	7,898,847

=== 25 largest research libraries by titles held ===
The following are the 25 ARL members with the largest number of titles held, "including catalogued, locally digitized, and licensed" titles. ARL follows the ANSI/NISO Z39.7-2004 definition of "title": "The designation of a separate bibliographic whole, whether issued in one or several volumes...Titles are defined according to the Anglo-American Cataloging Rules. A book or serial title may be distinguished from other titles by its unique International Standard Book Number (ISBN) or International Standard Serial Number (ISSN)." Multiple copies of the same work (for example, subscriptions to the same publication) are counted as a single title, but a serial title available in multiple formats (for example, print and online) are counted once for each available format.

Rank	Library	Institution	Titles Held (2020)
1	Harvard Library	Harvard University	18,711,275
2	University of California, Los Angeles Library	University of California, Los Angeles	17,679,327
3	Yale University Library	Yale University	12,826,347
4	Columbia University Libraries	Columbia University	10,814,827
5	University of Michigan Library	University of Michigan	10,692,811
6	University of California, Berkeley Libraries	University of California, Berkeley	9,816,654
7	University of Illinois Urbana-Champaign University Library	University of Illinois Urbana-Champaign	9,546,739
8	University of Wisconsin–Madison Libraries	University of Wisconsin–Madison	9,211,820
9	Princeton University Library	Princeton University	9,163,538
10	Indiana University Libraries	Indiana University	8,995,411
11	Michigan State University Libraries	Michigan State University	8,855,996
12	New York University Libraries	New York University	8,544,313
13	Cornell University Library	Cornell University	8,364,927
14	Northwestern University Library	Northwestern University	8,198,268
15	Pennsylvania State University Libraries	Pennsylvania State University	8,191,408
16	University of Texas Libraries	University of Texas at Austin	8,152,478
17	University of Chicago Library	University of Chicago	8,151,994
18	Penn Libraries	University of Pennsylvania	7,464,058
19	University of Colorado Boulder University Libraries	University of Colorado Boulder	7,086,420
20	Duke University Libraries	Duke University	7,037,558
21	Ohio State University Libraries	Ohio State University	6,855,146
22	University of Virginia Library	University of Virginia	6,854,203
23	University of Washington Libraries	University of Washington	6,831,932
24	Louisiana State University Libraries	Louisiana State University	6,457,134

== See also ==
- Books in the United States
- List of largest libraries
- List of libraries in the United States
- University libraries in the United States
