= University of California, Berkeley Libraries =

UC Berkeley Libraries
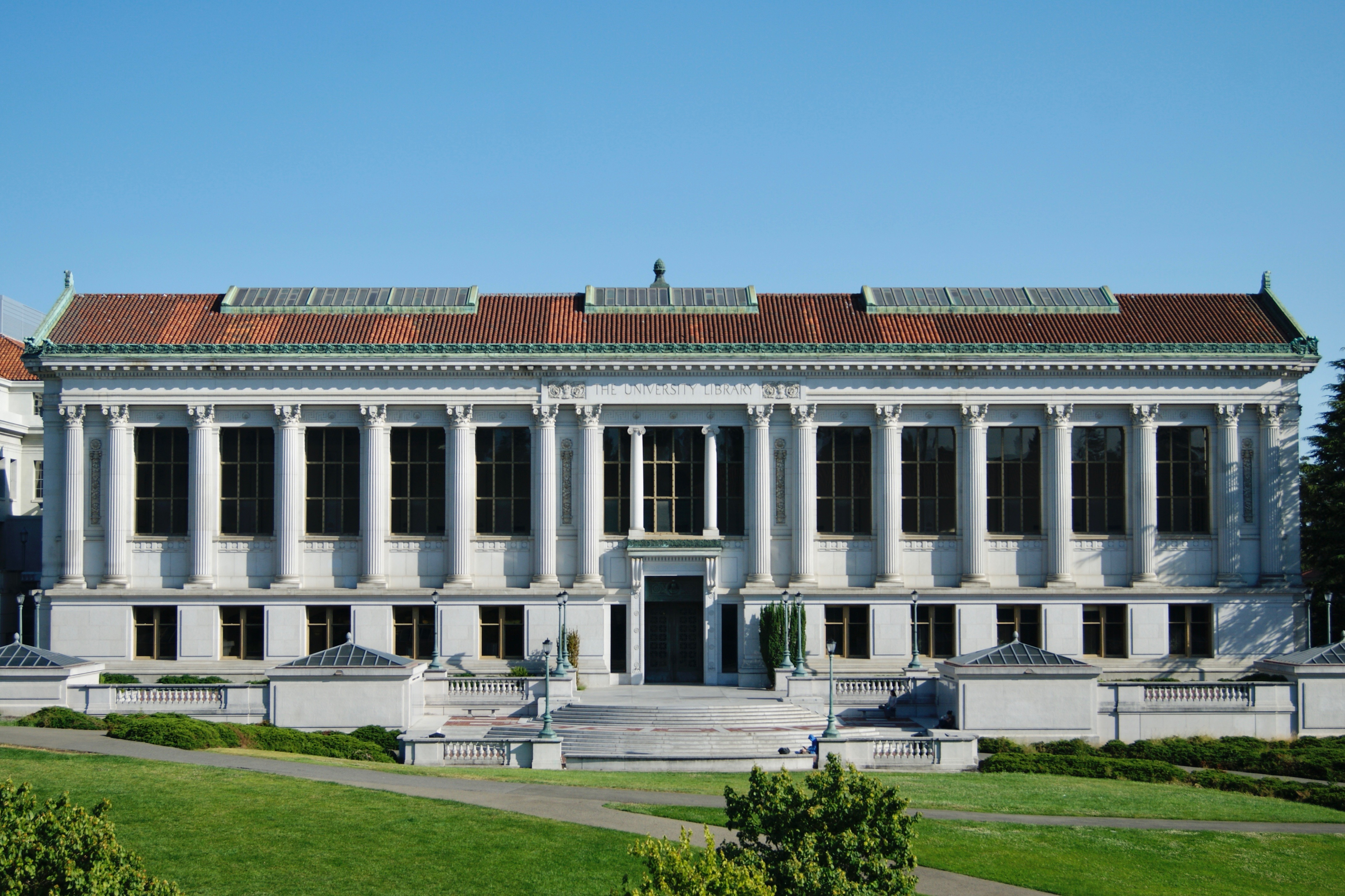
- The north side of Doe Library with Memorial Glade in the foreground
- Established: 1868
- Branches: 19 subject libraries; 7 affiliated libraries

Collection
- Size: 14 million books; 70,000 serials

Access and use
- Population served: 43,000 UC faculty, staff, and students in addition to the Bay Area

Other information
- Budget: $50 million annually
- Director: Suzanne Wones
- Employees: Approximately 1,000 (212 librarians; 188 staff; c. 600 student employees)
- Website: www.lib.berkeley.edu

Twenty-six constituent and affiliated libraries combine to make the library system of the University of California, Berkeley the sixth-largest research library by number of volumes in the United States.

As of 2024, Berkeley's library system holds materials in more than 400 languages and includes more than 14 million volumes. The libraries together cover over 12 acres (4.9 ha) of land and compose one of the largest library complexes in the world. In 2003, the Association of Research Libraries ranked it as the top public and third overall university library in North America based on various statistical measures of quality.

== Doe Memorial Library ==
Charles Franklin Doe was the principal benefactor of the eponymous main library. The Doe Memorial Library, built in 1910, originally housed the main collections. A strictly Beaux-Arts Classical building, it was designed by campus architect John Galen Howard as one of the original structures in the "Athens of the West" campus plan. The library was meant to be the first building students and visitors saw when entering the university, although today most students enter from the opposite side at Sproul Plaza. Most of the main collections are now housed in the Main (Gardner) Stacks and the Northern Regional Library Facility, while Doe serves as the library system's reference, periodical, and administrative center.

=== Reading rooms ===
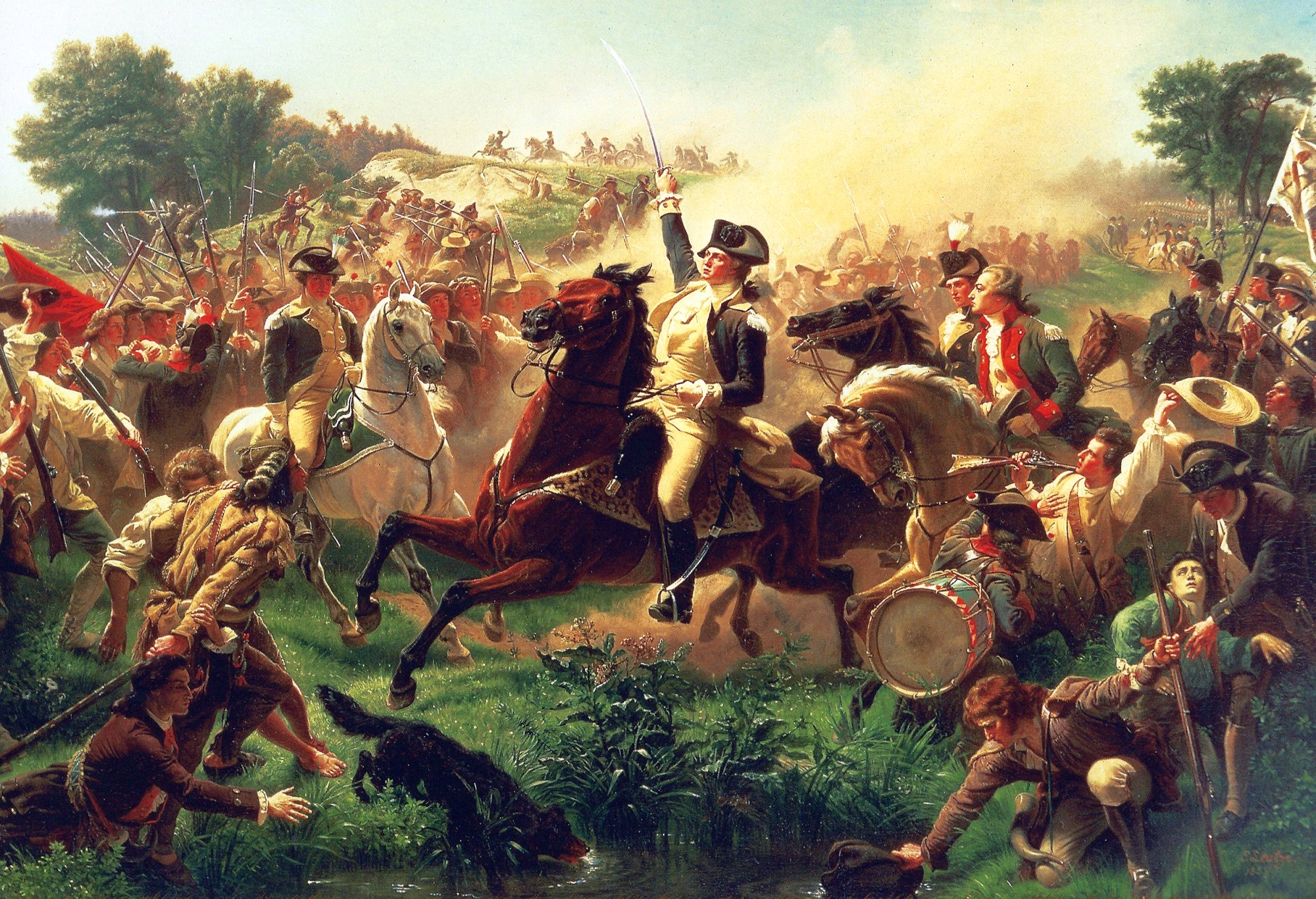
Leutze's Washington Rallying the Troops at Monmouth hangs in the Heyns Reading Room of the Doe Library

Inside Doe are the two largest reading rooms in the university, named the North and Heyns (East) reading rooms. The North Reading Room features a large barrel-vaulted ceiling capped with a tall Roman-arched windows at each end. The Heyns Reading Room, named after Roger W. Heyns, Chancellor of the University of California, Berkeley from 1965 to 1971, is the smaller of the two and exhibits hand-carved wood ceilings depicting the names of famous academics throughout history, as well as the companion piece to Emanuel Gottlieb Leutze's Washington Crossing the Delaware, Washington Rallying the Troops at Monmouth. The piece was originally a gift to the university in 1882 by Mrs. Mark Hopkins but was soon forgotten after it was stored in the Hearst Women's Gymnasium. It was not until the 1960s, when Dr. Raymond L. Stehle was writing a biography of Leutze, that it was rediscovered and placed in the Heyns Reading Room.

The North Reading Room features enormously high ceilings and was restored in 2005 to its original 1910 state. The renovated room features refinished historic tables and chairs, replaced floors, and task lighting similar to the original table lamps.

=== Lobby ===
The lobby of Doe features perpetually changing exhibits and also houses the Morrison Library. This library was a gift to the university by May T. Morrison in 1921 and is known as the university's “living room.” Many of its collections are works of classic or contemporary fiction. The library was featured in the 2000 Abercrombie & Fitch Back-to-School Catalogue.

=== Main Stacks ===
Underneath Doe is the Main (Gardner) Stacks, named after the 15th University of California President and Berkeley graduate, David P. Gardner. Built in 1994, these stacks contain 52 miles (84 km) of bookshelves and were intended to accommodate the growing library collections. Main Stacks consists of four underground floors, each roughly one-and-a-half football fields long and a football field wide. Although underground, it was built with four skylights that allow natural light to permeate even to the bottom floor.

== Bancroft Library ==
On the east side of Doe is the Bancroft Library, "one of the most heavily used libraries of manuscripts, rare books, and unique materials in the United States." This library contains over 60 million manuscript items, 600,000 volumes, 2.8 million photographs, 43,000 microforms, and 23,000 maps. The library originated in 1905 as a center for Latin-American History and Western Americana when it acquired the collections of Herbert Howe Bancroft and gained prominence under the leadership and research of Director Herbert Eugene Bolton. Today, the library also houses the largest collection of ancient papyri in the Western Hemisphere, 300 medieval manuscripts, and thousands of rare and first-edition early European and American works. Some of the most famous library holdings are the Mark Twain Papers, a collection of letters, journals, and nearly 600 manuscripts of unpublished works by Samuel L. Clemens, and pieces of Homer's The Odyssey and Euripides's work from ancient Greece.

== Other libraries ==
The library system also contains many other departmental and specialized libraries, including the 580,000 volume Marian Koshland Bioscience, Natural Resources & Public Health Library, the C. V. Starr East Asian Library (the largest of its kind in the West), and the Jean Gray Hargrove Music Library, which features more than 260,000 books, printed music, recordings, microfilms, and rare materials.

== List of libraries and departmental collections ==
- Doe Library
- Moffitt Library
- Bancroft Library
- Environmental Design Library
- Main (Gardner) Stacks
- Morrison Library
- Art History/Classics Library
- Marian Koshland Bioscience, Natural Resources & Public Health Library
- Thomas J. Long Business and Economics Library
- Ethnic Studies Library
- Chemistry, Astronomy & Physics Library
- Earth Sciences & Map Library
- Institute of Governmental Studies Library
- C.V. Starr East Asian Library
- Grimes Engineering Library
- Graduate Services
- Northern Regional Library Facility
- Newspapers & Microforms Library
- Jean Gray Hargrove Music Library
- Social Research Library
- South/Southeast Asia Library

=== Affiliated libraries ===
- Environmental Design Archives
- Harmer E. Davis Transportation Library
- Institute for Research on Labor and Employment Library
- Law Library
- Berkeley Art Museum and Pacific Film Archive
- Graduate Theological Union Library
- Library of French Thought

== See also ==
- University of California Libraries
