= Doe Memorial Library =

Coordinates: 37.87210°N 122.25940°W

- U.S. National Register of Historic Places
- Berkeley Landmark
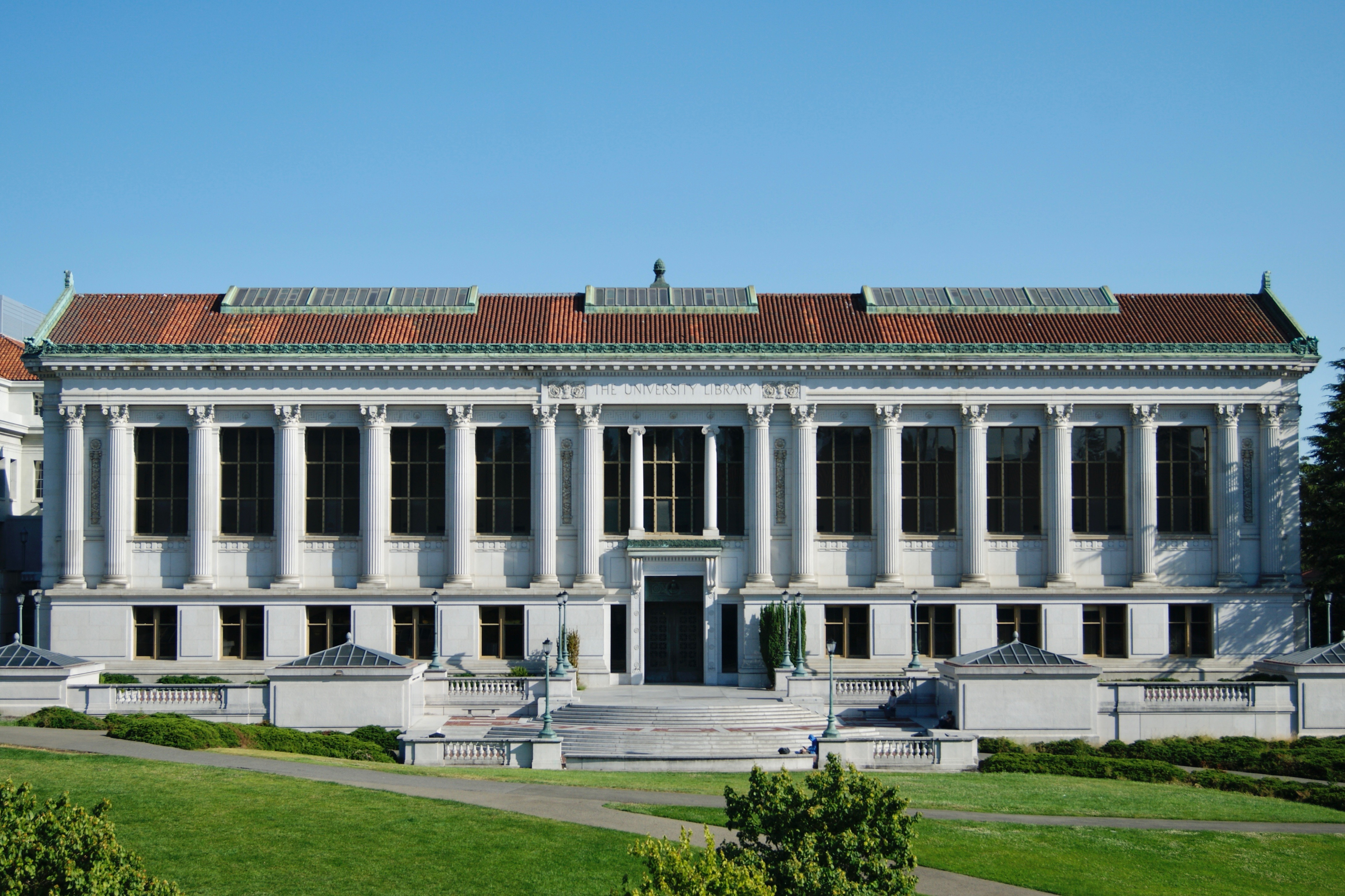
- Doe Library from Memorial Glade

- Location within Oakland, California Location within California Location within the United States
- Location: University of California, Berkeley; Berkeley, California
- Built: 1911
- Architect: Émile Bénard
- Architectural style: Classical Revival
- MPS: University of California, Berkeley MRA
- NRHP reference No.: 82004639
- BERKL No.: 148

Significant dates
- Added to NRHP: March 25, 1982
- Designated BERKL: February 25, 1991

The Doe Memorial Library is the main library of the University of California, Berkeley Library System. The library is named after its benefactor, Charles Franklin Doe, who in 1904 bequeathed funds for its construction. It is located near the center of the Berkeley campus, facing Memorial Glade, and is adjacent to and physically connected with the Bancroft Library. In 1900, Émile Bénard won an architectural competition for the design of the library, and the Neoclassical-style building was completed in 1911. The Doe Library building is the gateway to the underground Gardner (Main) Stacks, named in honor of David P. Gardner, the 15th President of the University of California.

The library is home to the Mark Twain Papers, an extensive collection of the private manuscripts, sketches, essays, poems, notes, photographs and letters of Samuel Clemens’ works as Twain. At the library's entrance is a statue of Clemens holding a copy of Adventures of Huckleberry Finn, sculpted by Gary Lee Price. The statue is commonly mistaken for Albert Einstein, with whom Twain shared a likeness.

== Gardner (Main) Stacks Collection ==
The Gardner (Main) Stacks is a four-story underground structure consisting of 52 miles of bookshelves, most of which are mobile shelving. It is home to 2.3 million of the 4.5 million volumes in Doe Library's research collection; the rest are stored off-campus at the Northern Regional Library Facility in Richmond. The Main Stacks is home to most of UC Berkeley's books covering the arts, humanities, and social sciences, although collections for certain specific fields (e.g., East Asian history) are housed separately in other libraries on campus.

The Main Stacks were constructed in 1994 with four large skylights to allow for natural lighting of the underground structure. It is located immediately in front of the Doe Library building, underneath Doe's entrance plaza and a significant portion of Memorial Glade (all of which were dug up during the mid-1990s and then later rebuilt). The main entrance to the Gardner (Main) Stacks is through Doe, but the stacks are also connected to nearby Moffitt Library by means of an underground hallway to form a single gigantic library complex.

Because Doe's regular circulating collection is now stored underground in the Main Stacks, Doe's aboveground building is now visited primarily for its large reading rooms and to access non-circulating reference collections.

Prior to the construction of the Main Stacks, Doe Library's book collections were stored inside the main building in a central space called the Doe Core. Since then, this space has been used for temporary libraries displaced under seismic retrofitting on the Berkeley campus. Doe Core is 70 feet tall.

Facade details

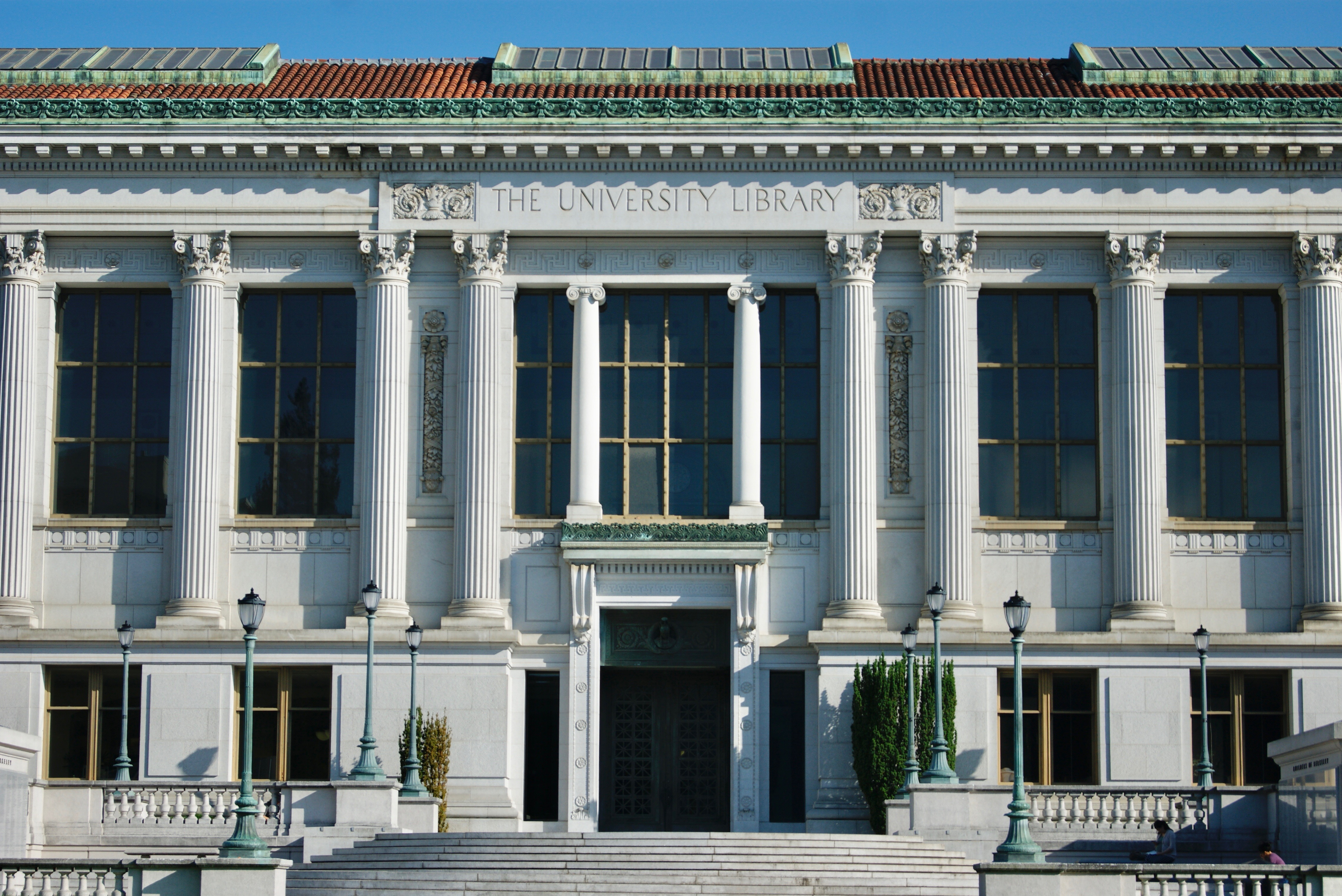
Detail of the entrance and the pediment

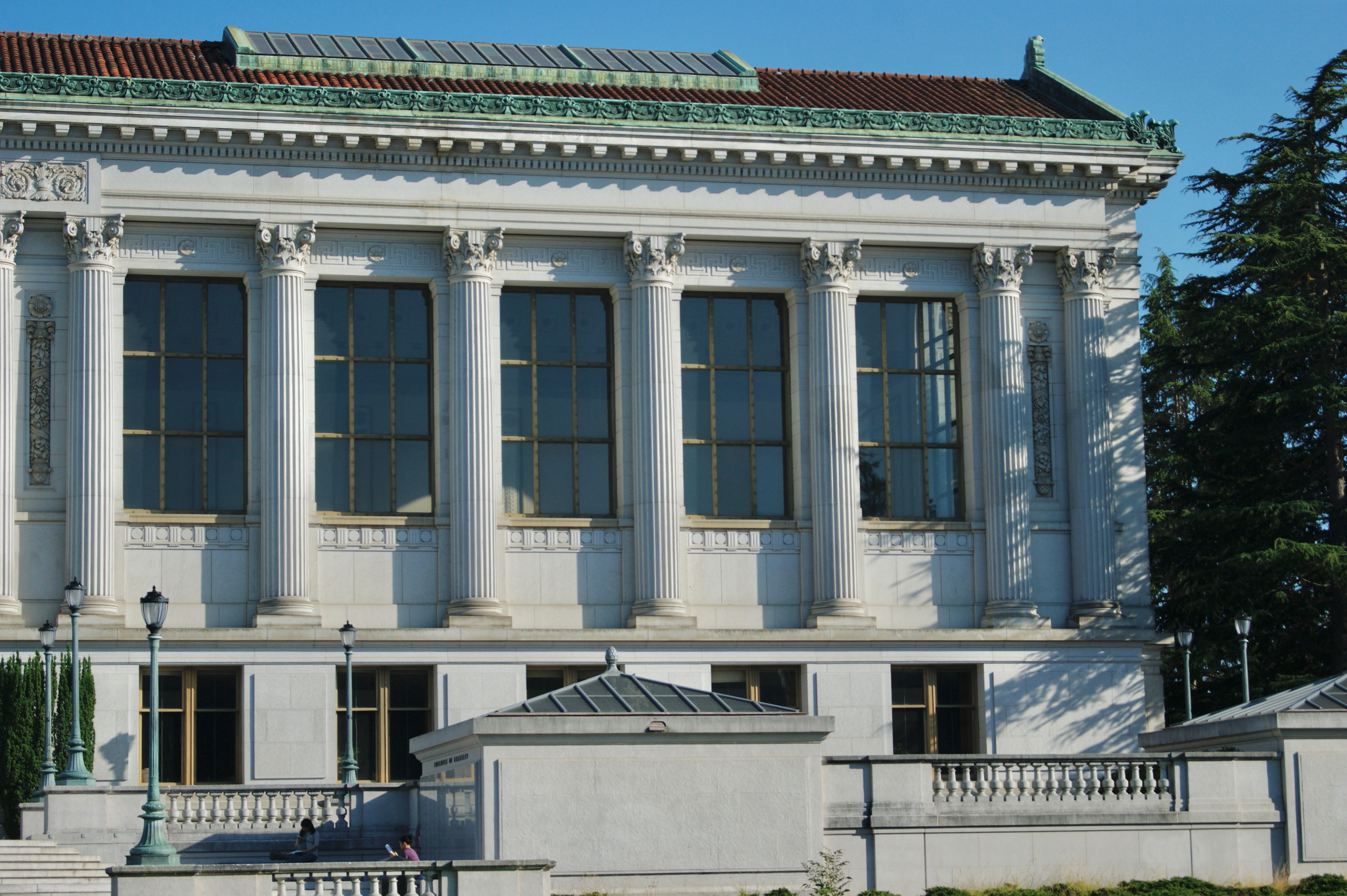
West part of the main facade.

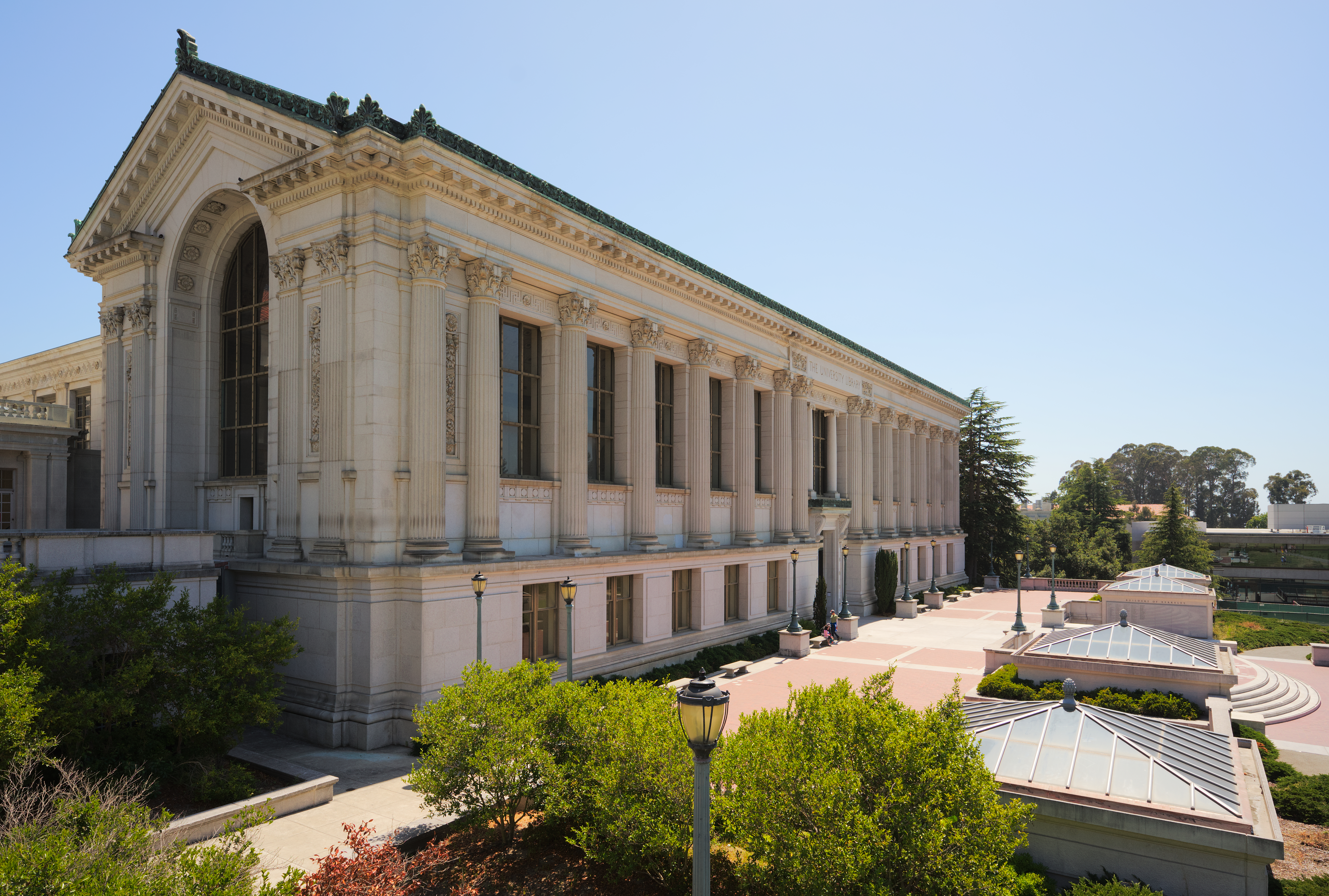
Three quarter view of the East and North facades.
