= Bev Hickok =

American librarian (1919–2014)

- Bev Hickok, from a 1957 newspaper, photograph by Cecil Davis
- Born: Beverly Hickok; October 31, 1919; San Francisco, California
- Died: October 9, 2014 (aged 94)
- Other name: Bev Hickock
- Occupations: Librarian, activist

Beverly Hickok (October 31, 1919 – October 9, 2014), sometimes written as Bev Hickock, was an American librarian, founder and head of the Transportation Library at the University of California, Berkeley. She was also a prominent early member of gay rights and lesbian community organizations in the San Francisco area.

== Early life ==
Hickock was born in San Francisco, California, the only child of Clifton Ewing Hickok (1880–1954) and Adelaide Valentine Cutler Hickok (1887–1987). Her father, a civil engineer from Missouri, was a city official in Alameda. She attended the University of California, Berkeley as an undergraduate, and earned a master's degree in library science.She was a member of Delta Delta Delta.

== Career ==
Hickok taught as a young woman. She was a riveter at a Douglas Aircraft plant in Santa Monica, and a member of the United States Navy WAVES during World War II. She created the Transportation Library at the University of California, Berkeley in 1948, and was head of the collection. She compiled and published several specialized bibliographies and research guides for transportation engineers. She was president of the San Francisco Bay chapter of the Special Libraries Association. In 1982, she received the first Professional Achievement Award from the Transportation Division of the Special Libraries Association, in the year of her retirement from Berkeley.

Hickok was an early member of gay rights organizations in San Francisco, including the Daughters of Bilitis, Old Lesbians Organizing for Change (OLOC) and Lavender Seniors. A story by Hickok, "The Gay Party", was published in The Ladder. She wrote a book, Against the Current; Coming Out in the 40s (2003). She gave oral history interviews in 1994, to the GLBT Historical Society, and in 2003, to the Old Lesbians Oral History Project.

== Personal life ==
Hickok's first long-term partner was photographer Cecil (Cece) Davis; they were together 41 years before Davis died in 1988. Her second long-term partner was Doreen Brand; they legally married in 2008, after 18 years together. Hickok died in 2014, aged 94 years. Her papers are part of the June L. Mazer Lesbian Archives at UCLA.
