= Joe and Rika Mansueto Library =

University of Chicago library

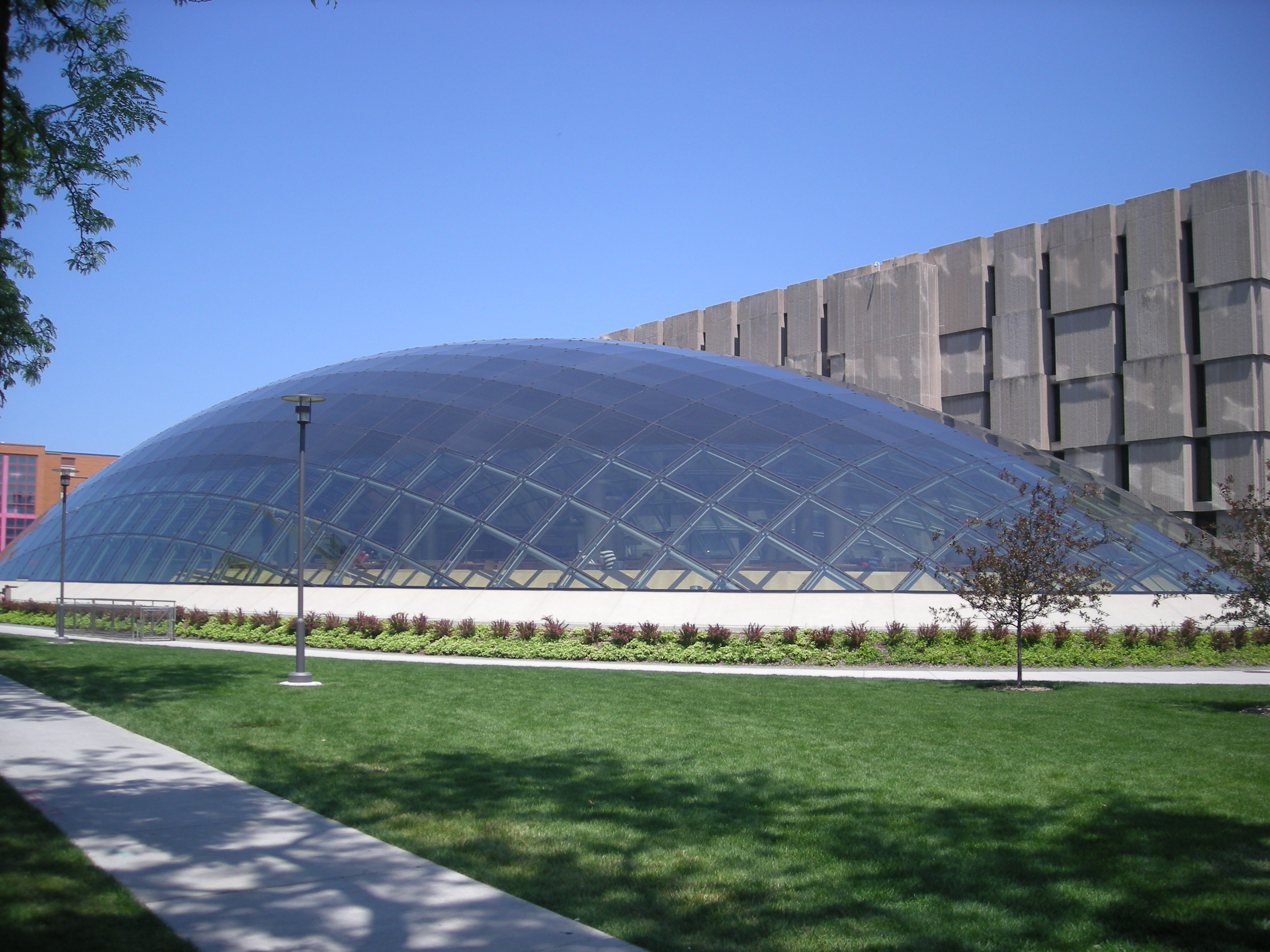
- Mansueto Library
- 41.7919°N 87.6009°W
- Location: Hyde Park, Chicago, United States
- Type: Academic library
- Established: 2011
- Branch of: University of Chicago Library

Collection
- Items collected: Books, journals, newspapers, magazines, sound and music recordings, maps, prints, drawings and manuscripts
- Size: 3.5 million (capacity)

Access and use
- Members: 33,000

Other information
- Director: Torsten Reimer
- Website: lib.uchicago.edu/mansueto

The Joe and Rika Mansueto Library is a storage library of the University of Chicago. Part of the University of Chicago Library system, it has a capacity of 3.5 million volumes under an elliptical dome. It was designed by Helmut Jahn, and was named after alumni Joe Mansueto and Rika Mansueto.

== History and construction ==
Mansueto Library, designed by Chicago-based architect Helmut Jahn, consists of a glass-domed reading room, above high-density closed bookstacks which can be accessed through an automated storage and retrieval system. The physical retrieval is carried out by multiple robotic cranes, averaging about three minutes per retrieval. Mansueto allows the university to maintain the vast majority of its library holdings on campus in a centrally located facility, while creating space to accommodate new acquisitions for approximately 20 years.

Planning for the library grew out of studies beginning in 2003 by a faculty task force, because other campus libraries, primarily the Regenstein Library, were running out of space for new books. In 2005, the board of trustees approved building a high-density storage facility next to the Regenstein building. The choice of Helmut Jahn was made in February 2006. Construction began in 2008, and the building was dedicated in late 2011.

== Reception ==
Mansueto Library received several architectural accolades in the years following its dedication. Among these was a Distinguished Building Award from the American Institute of Architects Chicago Chapter in 2011. The library also earned second place in the First Baku International Architectural Competition, and was a finalist for the Chicago Building Congress New Construction award and the libraries category of the Architizer A+ Awards.

Beyond the original purpose of aiding in research endeavors, Mansueto has earned a place in the collegiate community of the University of Chicago through the attention it has drawn from those within the university and beyond. In 2013, the makers of the film Divergent, interested in the unique glass design of the library, used Mansueto in a scene of the futuristic dystopian film, allowing select undergraduates to take part in the process. The library has also been a part of a handful of items within the University of Chicago Scavenger Hunt, better known amongst the faculty and students as Scav. These aspects of Mansueto have made it one of the staples of the many tours the university gives to its prospective students, establishing the library as a common representative of the university.

== Figures ==
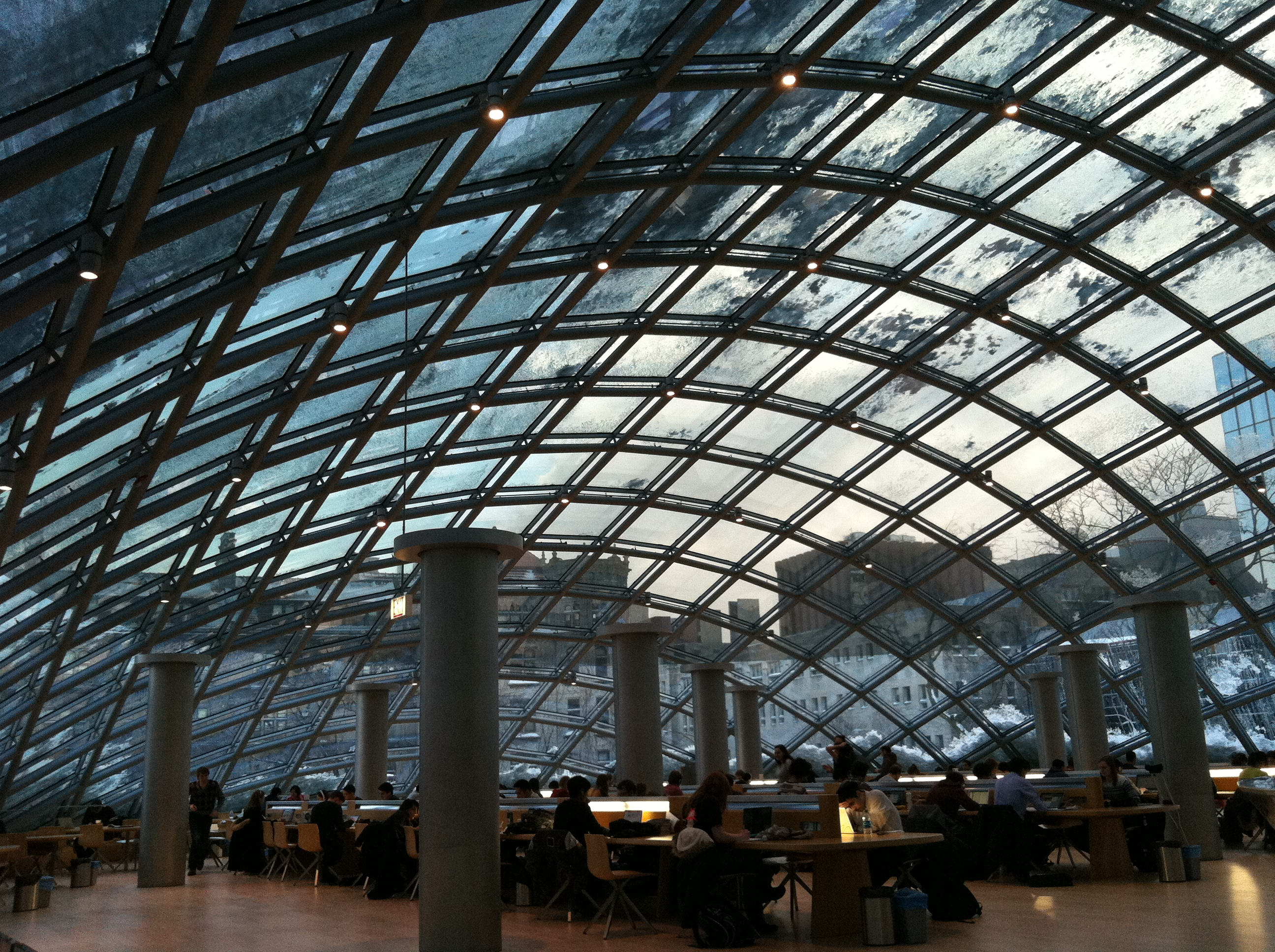
View from inside the library

Figures on the construction of the library:

- Height of the dome at the highest point: 35 feet
- Length: 240 feet
- Width: 120 feet
- Storage capacity: 3.5 million volumes
- North American libraries with larger automated storage and retrieval systems: 0
- Typical book retrieval time: 5 minutes
