= California Center for Innovative Transportation =

US research organization

Coordinates: 37°52′3.83″N 122°16′2.34″W

The California Center for Innovative Transportation (CCIT) was a research organization at the University of California, Berkeley Institute of Transportation Studies.

CCIT was formed in 2001 as a group within California Partners for Advanced Traffic and Highways (PATH), another UC Berkeley transportation research center; in 2003 they became an independent center, with a focus on accelerating the implementation of research findings and technical solutions that improve the safety and efficiency of California's surface transportation. It came full circle when it re-merged with PATH in 2011 to form Partners for Advanced Transportation Technology, retaining the PATH acronym instead of "PATT".

CCIT was formed by Hamed Benouar, a former Caltrans executive who is also a former California State Chief Traffic Engineer. The last CCIT Director was Thomas West, also a former Caltrans executive and current Co-Director at PATH.
