= Chamber of Commerce and Industry of Turkmenistan =

Non-profit public organization of Turkmenistan

- Türkmenistanyň Söwda-senagat edarasy
- Formation: 1994; 32 years ago
- Type: Non-profit public organization
- Legal status: Active
- Purpose: Promoting the development of the economy of Turkmenistan and its integration into the global economic system
- Headquarters: Ashgabat, Turkmenistan
- Head: Mergen Gurdov
- Website: https://www.cci.gov.tm/

The Chamber of Commerce and Industry of Turkmenistan (Turkmen: Türkmenistanyň Söwda-senagat edarasy) is a non-profit public organization that operates under the 2015 Law of Turkmenistan on "The Chamber of Commerce and Industry of Turkmenistan" and the Chamber's Charter. It unites enterprises, organizations, and entrepreneurs on a voluntary basis, with the purpose of supporting and protecting their interests.

Established in 1994, the primary objective of the Chamber was formulated as to contribute to the development of Turkmenistan's economy, encourage its increased involvement in the global economic system, improve current industrial, financial and trade infrastructure, create favorable conditions for diverse entrepreneurial activities, and foster collaboration with governmental entities.

The Chamber of Commerce and Industry of Turkmenistan works towards the development of trade, economic, investment, and scientific-technical cooperation between Turkmen entrepreneurs and business circles in foreign countries.

The Chamber also serves as the organizer of international congresses and exhibitions, both within Turkmenistan and abroad.

== History and Mission ==
The building of the Chamber of Commerce and Industry of Turkmenistan in Ashgabat, Turkmenistan.

The Law of Turkmenistan "On the Chamber of Commerce and Industry" was adopted on October 8, 1993, while the Charter of the Chamber was adopted at its inaugural congress in 1994. The new Law of Turkmenistan "On the Chamber of Commerce and Industry of Turkmenistan" was adopted in 2015.

The mission of the Chamber of Commerce and Industry of Turkmenistan is formulated as fostering the economic development of Turkmenistan, facilitating its integration into the global economic system, shaping a contemporary industrial, financial, and trade infrastructure, creating conducive conditions for business, as well as aiding in establishing trade, economic, scientific, and technical collaborations with international partners.

A primary objective for the Chamber is to prioritize the promotion of domestic goods and services in foreign markets. It provides support to local manufacturers and exporters, facilitating their operations and endeavors in international markets.

The Chamber also functions as the organizer of international conferences and exhibitions, both within Turkmenistan and on a global scale.

== Structure and tasks ==
=== Structure of the Chamber ===
The Chamber is a non-profit public organization that operates under the 2015 Law of Turkmenistan on "The Chamber of Commerce and Industry of Turkmenistan" and the Chamber's Charter. It also unites enterprises, organizations, and entrepreneurs, regardless of their ownership structures, on a voluntary basis.

At present the Chamber comprises:

- 4 regional Chambers of Commerce and Industry;
- 4 subsidiary enterprises.

=== Tasks of the Chamber ===
The main tasks of the Chamber of Commerce and Industry are to promote entrepreneurial development and to provide assistance, represent, and safeguard the interests of the members of the Chamber, both within and outside Turkmenistan. Other tasks are to contribute to the development of exports of goods and services, conduct examinations related to quality control, quantity, and completeness of goods, determine the cost of products and assets, organize international and national exhibitions, fairs, conferences, business forums and others.

== Members ==
Members of the Chamber of Commerce and Industry include legal entities, regardless of their ownership forms and organizational-legal structures, as well as entrepreneurs conducting their activities without establishing a legal entity. These entities should specialize in the commercial sphere or actively contribute to the development of Turkmenistan's economic, scientific, technical, and trade relations with other countries.

Associations and unions that bring together entrepreneurs based on industry or regional criteria may also qualify for membership in the Chamber.
