= Melvyl =

University of California library catalog

Melvyl was the online catalog of the University of California's library system. The Melvyl union catalog was produced by the California Digital Library — a unit within the department of Academic Planning, Programs, and Coordination at the UC Office of the President in downtown Oakland, California. Melvyl was named after Melvil Dewey, the library pioneer who invented the Dewey Decimal System. Melvyl was supported by the OCLC's WorldCat Local platform, which was retired in July 2021.

== Overview ==
The Melvyl database contained over 30 million records from the:

- ten University of California campuses,
- two University of California library storage facilities, the Southern Regional Library Facility (SRLF) and the Northern Regional Library Facility (NRLF),
- and the Center for Research Libraries.

Melvyl is a registered trademark owned by the Regents of the University of California.

== History ==
Melvyl began as a library automation system in 1977. Merging MARC records from the UC campuses into a union catalog was first done in a microfiche format. Online access began in 1980 as a prototype for library staff. In 1981, library patrons were able to access an online electronic catalog of UC library books using a computer terminal. Since no network existed to connect the libraries of the nine campuses to the central site hosting the union catalog, options for a networking solution were analyzed, with X.25 and TCP/IP being considered. By 1984, a TCP/IP network linking the campuses using satellite technology was operational. At the time, Melvyl ran on a mainframe computer, and the UC Division of Library Automation performed development work to implement TCP/IP in order to provide telnet access. A World Wide Web version was also later developed.

The mainframe system, retired in 2003, was replaced using commercial software from the integrated library system vendor Ex Libris. The legacy telnet mode was retired in 2007.

The Ex Libris version was retired in June 2011 and Melvyl was then provided by OCLC's WorldCat Local platform. In March 2021, the UC Libraries announced that Melvyl would be retired as the UC Libraries migrate to a unified library catalog and discovery system (based on Ex Libris' Alma/Primo VE).

In July 2021 the Melvyl site and brand was retired and the new systemwide integrated library system / library management system was launched. The new discovery system is called UC Library Search (Primo VE instances for each UC campus) with a systemwide Alma backbone.
