= Moffitt Library =

University library

Coordinates: 37°52′20.95″N 122°15′38.78″W

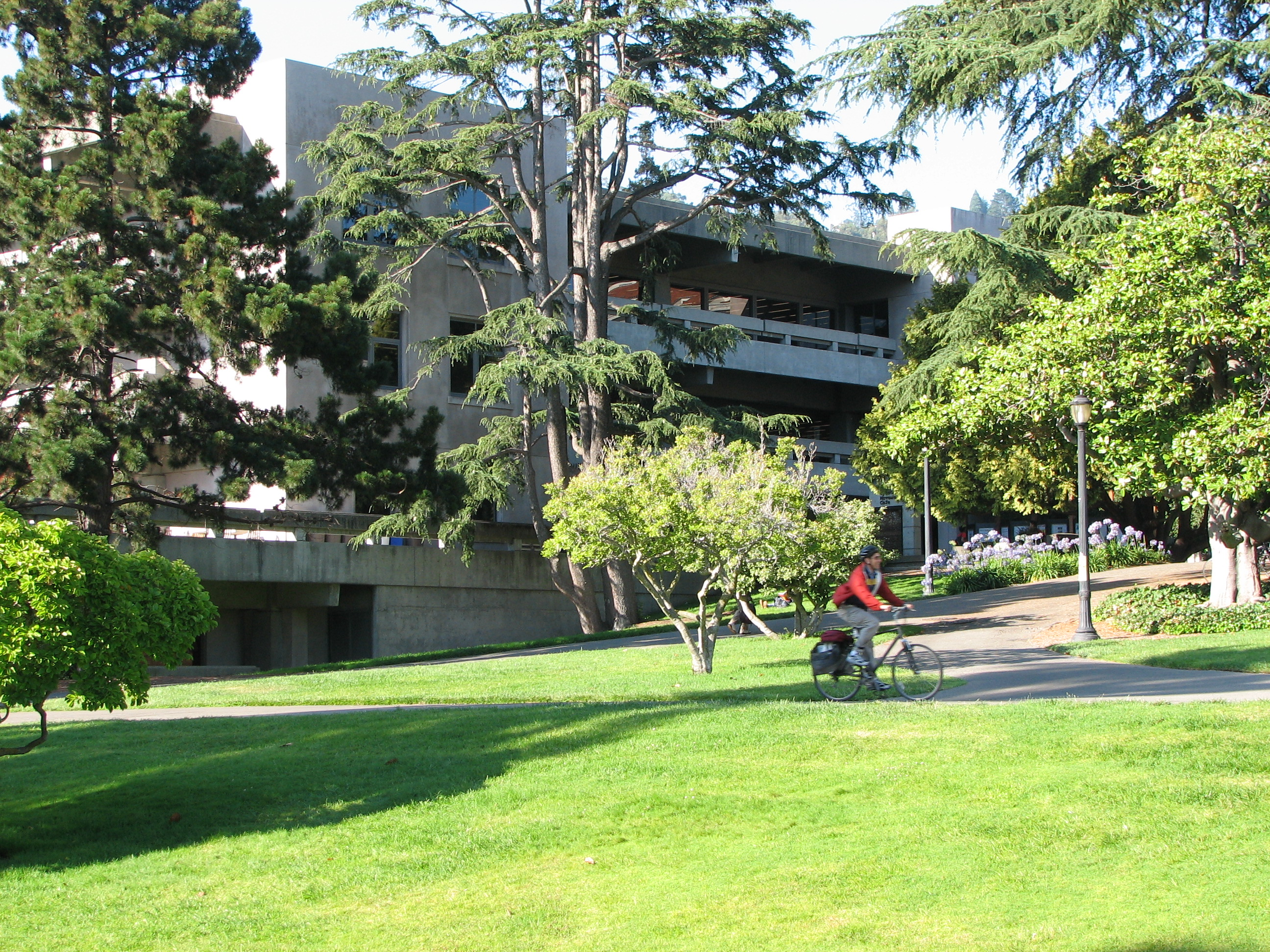
Moffitt Library exterior

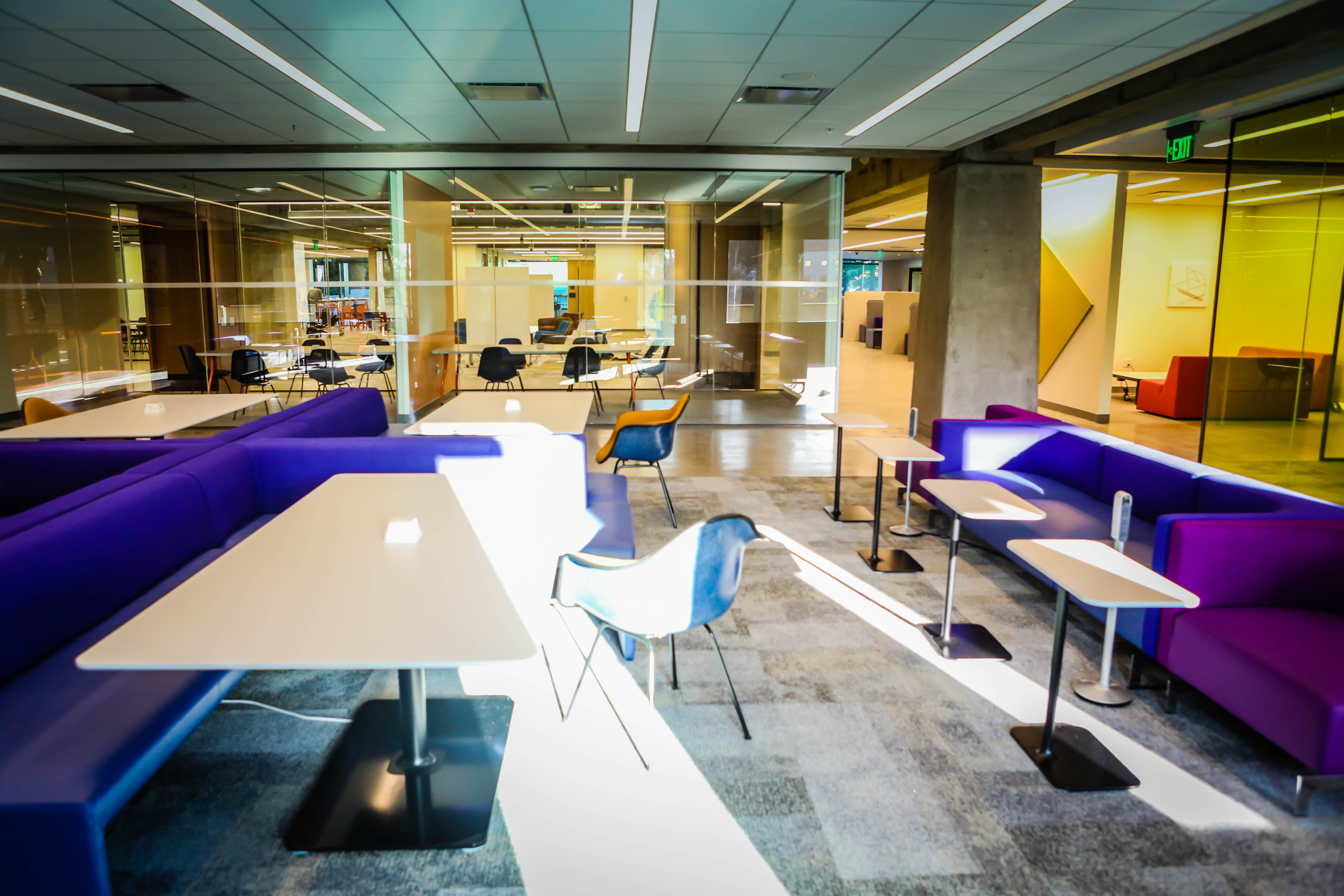
Moffitt Library interior

The James K. Moffitt Undergraduate Library, simply known as Moffitt Library, is a library situated at the crossroads of the University of California, Berkeley, designed by American activist John Carl Warnecke in the late 1960s as a cutting-edge library for undergraduates. Named after James K. Moffitt, a former Regent of the University of California, the library has been a popular destination for students for over four decades. Campus and curriculum changes in the time since Moffitt Library opened have been a catalyst for considering new purposes for this highly trafficked space. Accommodating increased undergraduate enrollments, greater focus on problem-based and research-based learning, and demand for access to technology-rich spaces have all been taken into account as part of the re-imagination of this library.

The University Library began re-envisioning Moffitt Library with the renovation of Floors 4 and 5 in 2016, transforming them into a flexible, 24-hour environment for individual and group study. The renovated floors provide a variety of spaces including open casual seating, meeting rooms for brainstorming and group projects, and nooks and carrels for quiet study. Updates also included improvements to critical building systems, life-safety features, and have created a foundation for further renovations of the library.

Moffitt Library also features the Free Speech Movement Café, located at the Library's south entrance on Floor 3, in honor of American activist Mario Savio, who played a key role in the Free Speech Movement. In front of the Free Speech Movement Café is the Newspaper Display Wall, where visitors can read the daily front page of various international newspapers.

== See also ==
- Free Speech Movement
- University of California, Berkeley Libraries
