= New York University Libraries =

New York University Division of Libraries
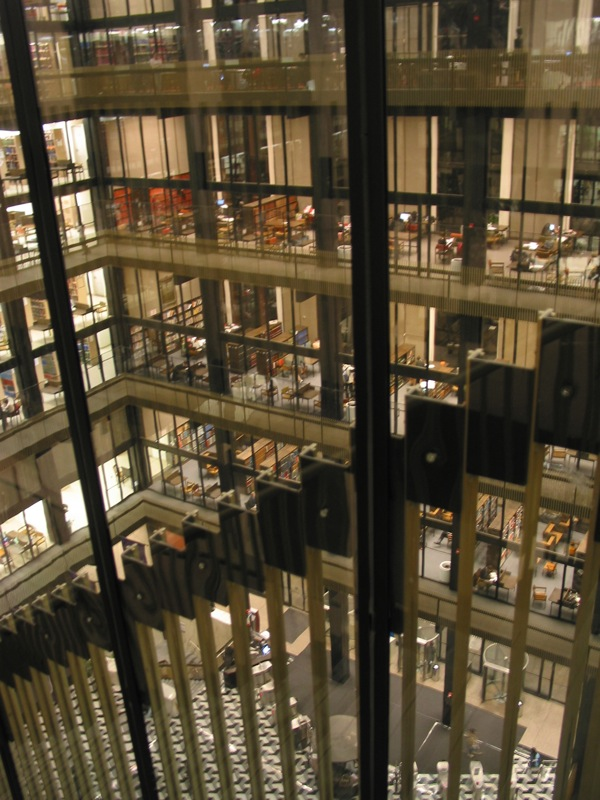
- Elmer Holmes Bobst Library
- Location: Worldwide, United States
- Type: Academic library
- Established: 1831
- Branches: 24 (worldwide)

Collection
- Size: 9,837,021

Access and use
- Circulation: Over one million books annually
- Members: Over 100,000

Other information
- Director: Carol A. Mandel
- Website: http://library.nyu.edu/

New York University Division of Libraries (NYU Libraries) is the library system of New York University (NYU), located on the university's global campus, but primarily in the United States. It is one of the largest university libraries in the United States. The NYU Libraries hold nearly 10 million volumes and comprises five main libraries in Manhattan and one each in Brooklyn, Abu Dhabi and Shanghai. Its flagship, the Elmer Holmes Bobst Library on Washington Square, receives 2.6 million visits annually. Around the world the Libraries offers access to about 10 million electronic journals, books, and databases. NYU's Game Center Open Library in Brooklyn is the largest collection of games held by any university in the world.

== NYU Libraries ==
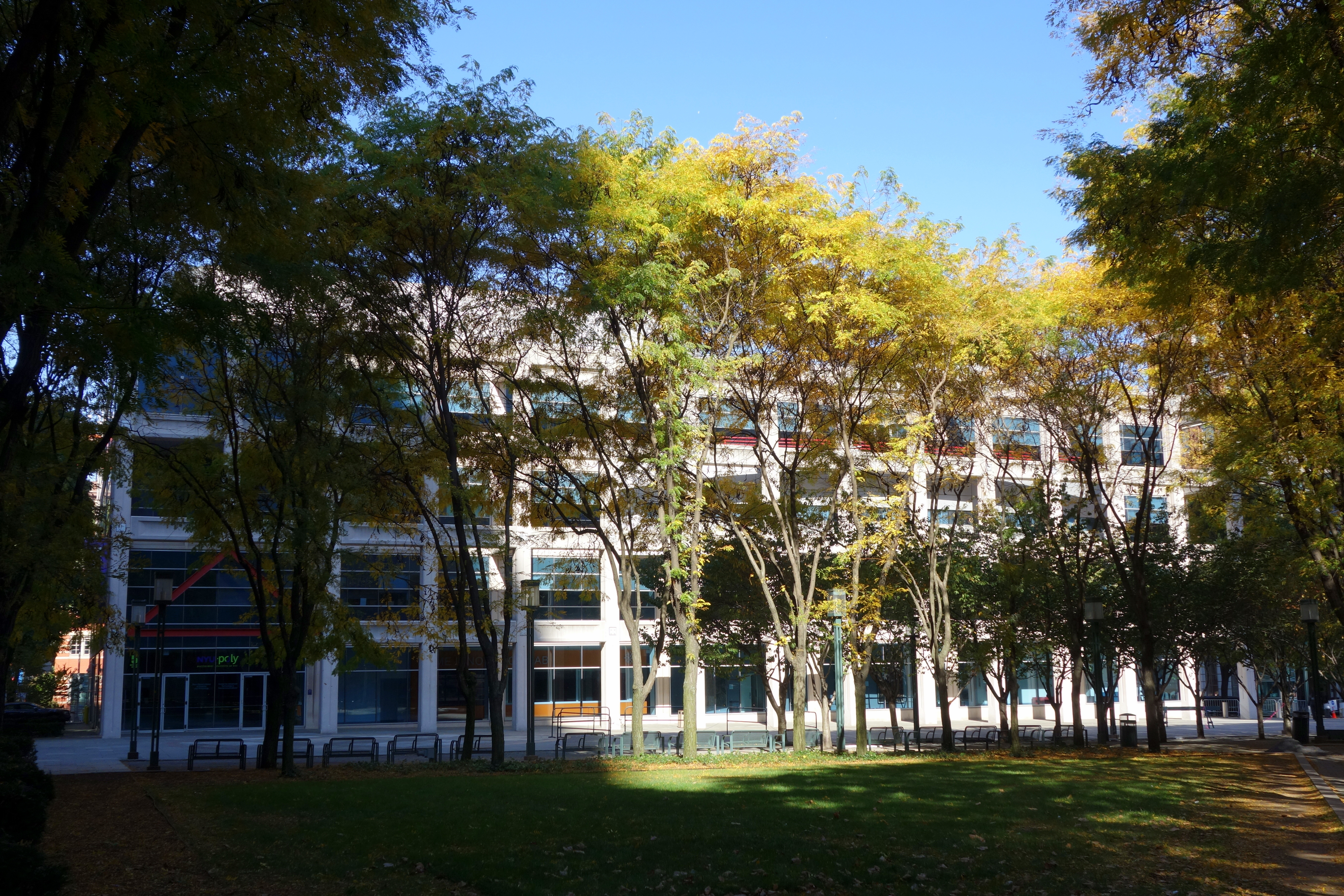
Bern Dibner Library of Science and Technology on the Brooklyn campus

New York University (NYU) library system is composed of the following libraries:

- Elmer Holmes Bobst Library
- Sid and Ruth Lapidus Health Sciences Library
- Waldmann Memorial Dental Library
- Grey Fine Arts Library and Study Center
- Business Library
- Ross Library at the Stern School of Business' Accounting Department
- Jack Brause Library for Real Estate
- Courant Institute of Mathematical Sciences Library
- Institute of Fine Arts Library
- Ettinghausen Library
- Dibner Library
- Constantine Georgiou Library
- Crisman Library at Broome Residential College
- Avery Fisher Library for Music and Media
- Acton Library
- Game Center Open Library
- Institute for the Study of the Ancient World (ISAW)
- Law Library
- New-York Historical Society
- New York School of Interior Design Library
- NYU Abu Dhabi Library
- NYU Shanghai Library
- Villa La Pietra Library

=== Specialized libraries ===
- Bern Dibner Library (Tandon School of Engineering)
- Business Library (Stern School of Business)
- Courant Institute of Mathematical Sciences Library (Courant Institute of Mathematical Sciences)
- Health Sciences Libraries (including Ehrman Medical Library)
- Institute for the Study of the Ancient World Library
- Jack Brause Library for Real Estate (Schack Institute of Real Estate, School for Professional Studies)
- Law Library (School of Law)
- Ettinghausen Library (Near Eastern Studies)
- Conservation Center Library (Institute of Fine Arts)
- Stephen Chan Library of Fine Arts (Institute of Fine Arts)
- Ross Library (Stern School of Business' Accounting Department)
- Grey Fine Arts Library and Study Center (Art History)
- Avery Fisher Library (Music and Media)
- Game Center Open Library (Tandon School of Engineering)
- The Constantine Georgiou Library (Steinhardt School of Culture, Education, and Human Development)

== See also ==
- New York University
- Fales Library
