= University of Chicago Library =

Library system in Chicago, IL

Coordinates: 41.7922°N 87.6000°W

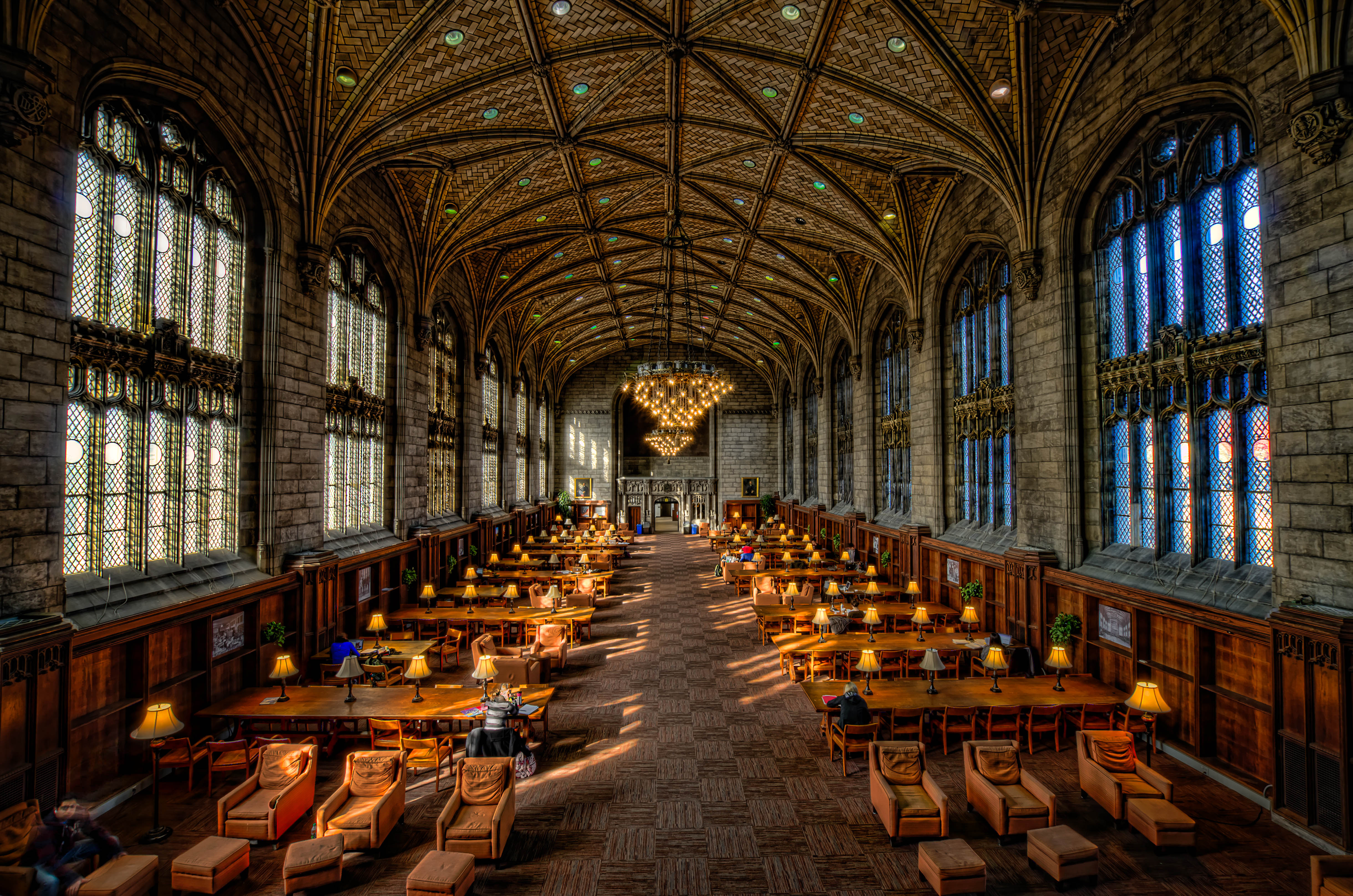
- The interior of the Harper Memorial Library. Today, Harper Memorial functions as a study space and reading room; it no longer provides collection access.
- Location: Hyde Park, Chicago, United States
- Type: Academic library
- Established: 1891
- Branches: 6

Collection
- Size: 11,560,575

Access and use
- Circulation: 440,000
- Members: 33,000

Other information
- Director: Torsten Reimer
- Website: lib.uchicago.edu

The University of Chicago Library is the academic library system of the University of Chicago. It is the seventh largest academic library and the fourth largest private library in the United States, with over 14.2 million volumes as of 2025. The library also holds 76,434 linear feet of archives and manuscripts and 319 terabytes of born-digital archives, digitized collections, and research data. The library system consists of six constituent libraries.

The library was founded in 1891 by the inaugural president of the University of Chicago, William Rainey Harper, who set the course for Special Collections as a "working collection".

The library's collections are located in six sites:

- Joseph Regenstein Library (primary library),
- John Crerar Library (for science, technology, and medicine),
- D'Angelo Law Library (for legal studies),
- Joe and Rika Mansueto Library (storage library),
- Eckhart Library (for mathematics and statistics), and
- Social Work Library (for social work).

The library has borrowing privileges with several other archives, museums, and libraries in the Chicago area, including the Art Institute of Chicago Library, the Chicago History Museum, the Fermi National Accelerator Laboratory, the Field Museum of Natural History, and the Newberry Library.

== See also ==
- University of Chicago
