= Transportation Library, UC Berkeley =

Coordinates: 37°52′25.55″N 122°15′32.57″W

The Harmer E. Davis Transportation Library —also known as the Institute of Transportation Studies Library (ITSL), the Berkeley Transportation Library, or simply as the Transportation Library— is a transportation library at the University of California, Berkeley, devoted to transportation studies.

== Facilities ==
The library is located on the fourth floor of McLaughlin Hall, the original UC Berkeley Engineering Building, where it serves the faculty, students, researchers and staff of the multi-campus Institute of Transportation Studies. The library has been in its present location since 1964. In earlier years the library and the Institute of Transportation Studies were situated at the UC Berkeley Field Station in Richmond, about 8 miles north of Berkeley. In the Berkeley campus ITSL is an “Affiliated Library” one of several subject-specialist libraries that operate independently of the UC-Berkeley Main Library system.

The library has three full-time professional staff, four library assistants and five temporary student employees. At present the professional staff includes the Library Director/Reference Librarian, an Electronic Resources Librarian for Contract Services, and a Technical Services and Outreach Librarian. Other permanent staff include a Library Operations Manager, Circulation Manager, Interlibrary Loan Manager, and Serials Manager.

The library's website provides information on its location, staff, variations in opening hours, and latest news. The site underwent a major redesign in 2006, transforming the home page into a gateway to online sources of transportation information, featuring links to federal agency sites and to approximately 114 online journals of interest to transportation researchers. There are also links to the Institute of Transportation Studies’ four branches for information on their research, and faculty, staff and students. The library also has an official blog.

The library collection, begun by librarian Bev Hickok in 1948, covers all aspects of civil transportation, containing over 183,000 monographs (books, technical reports, conferences, etc.); 4,800 serials of which over 2,200 are current titles; 150,000 microfiche (primarily federally sponsored technical reports received from the National Technical Information Service); and several hundred CD-ROMs, videos and DVDs. As a U.S. federal and State of California depository the library receives material from the federal transportation agencies. It holds copies of nearly all federally sponsored reports on transportation published since 1974. Items are also regularly received from State Departments of Transportation (DOTs) and academic transportation research institutes across the USA. Much foreign material also comes in, primarily from Canada (including French language publications from Quebec), Australia, and several western European countries (mainly the United Kingdom, France, Germany, Netherlands, Sweden, Finland). The collections are particularly strong in urban transportation; highway and traffic engineering; aviation (airports, airlines, aeronautics in general); rail transportation; intelligent transportation systems.

It was officially renamed in 1998 in honor of the Institute of Transportation Studies’ founder, Harmer E. Davis, who died that year.

== Services ==
The library primarily serves the faculty, students, researchers and staff of the Institute of Transportation Studies in UC Berkeley, UC Davis, UC Irvine, and UCLA. Service is also available to the UC Berkeley community, non-UC corporate bodies, and the general public. The library sets out a candy dish for visitors.

The library serves as a center for meetings and social gatherings. It is the venue for the Institute's weekly social gathering of students and faculty each Friday afternoon during semester, and the monthly Traffic Safety Center seminar series. Recent meetings in ITSL included the Women In Transportation's annual Fall seminar; an Institute of Transportation Engineers presentation to Institute students; a lunch-meeting between ITS faculty and Association of America Railroads personnel; and a reception for a delegation from the US DOT's Research and Special Programs Administration.

Special efforts are made to maintain awareness of library services to the three non-Berkeley branches of the Institute. The Outreach Librarian visits the Davis, Irvine, and Los Angeles campuses at least once each year, taking part in orientation sessions for new students and attending the annual ITS students’ conference as a speaker. Students and faculty at these campuses are encouraged to regard the Library as their own and they are supplied directly with free loans or photocopies from its collections. The Outreach Librarian is also available to open the Library at weekends for visitors from the other ITS branches, though this offer has been availed of only a few times (after all the Bay Area has plenty other attractions.) All services to non-Berkeley ITS members are supplied free.

The library also provides a very efficient and busy interlibrary loan service. An average of 150 items (monographs, audiovisuals and photocopies) are supplied each month. Free service is provided to transportation research bodies in the state of California.

The library is a major source of cataloging for publications in transportation research. In addition to creating bibliographic records for monographs we produce a large number of analytics (journal and magazine articles, individual conference papers for which we have provided full cataloging). Analytics have been created for about 103,000 articles and papers. Cataloging has been done online since 1979 and the library's cataloging staff are among the most prolific contributors of transportation cataloging to the OCLC WorldCat database. Average production per month is 600 records for monographs and 450 records for analytics. The catalog records appear in the University of California's Melvyl online catalog, OCLC's WorldCat database, and the TRIS database. Regarding TRIS, the Library is a contributor of bibliographic records to the Transportation Research Board's TLIB project. Since 1985 bibliographic records for journal articles, and until very recently monographs, were sent free of charge to TLIB for inclusion in TRIS.

== Special projects ==
- PATH Database (1987-2005) The Library developed the PATH database, the world's largest online database on intelligent transportation systems. Launched in 1987 and funded by the California PATH Program, it contained over 28,000 fully abstracted records and grew by the addition of between 250 and 300 records per month. PATH Database was available free on the Web before funding was terminated in 2005. Though PATH is no more, its contents survive as part of TRIS (Transportation Research Information Services, a transportation database maintained by the Transportation Research Board in Washington, D.C.)
- California Local Technical Assistance Program (LTAP) As part of its LTAP commitment, the Library provides specialized reference service and circulates materials free of charge to California and other transportation agencies at the local level. Many items available for distribution are also referenced in a Resources Guide maintained by project staff. Additionally, Library professional staff write bibliographies which appear in Tech Transfer.
- Caltrans/TRIS (C/TRIS) abstracting project. This LTAP project provides specialized cataloging and abstracting for research reports sponsored by California Department of Transportation (Caltrans). Records generated are submitted directly to the Transportation Research Board for inclusion in its national TRIS Database. This ensures that Caltrans research reports are listed in TRIS database in a timely manner.
- B/TRIS indexing project. The Library's B/TRIS project, undertaken in cooperation with the Transportation Research Board (TRB), began operation in February 2001. In accordance with our agreement, Library staff index and abstract periodical articles from specific journal titles for direct input into TRB's TRIS Database. Five Library and ITS Berkeley staff are currently working on this project under the supervision of Seyem Petrites.
- Calendar projects. With its neighbor library the Water Resources Collections and Archives ITSL has for several years been jointly producing calendars with water and transportation themes featuring historic photographs of the Bay Area. The calendars are used to market and promote ITSL services, with copies distributed gratis to University of California engineering faculty and local, state and national transportation administrators and researchers. The calendars are also available for purchase as part of the Library's ongoing fundraising efforts. The 2006 calendar departs from the usual themes of bridges and ferries. Titled "Futuristics", it features vintage illustrations of innovative transportation ideas from bygone decades.
- Transportation Futuristics exhibit. The illustrations for the latest ITSL/WRCA calendar are drawn from an exhibit featuring weird and wonderful transportation ideas from the past. The exhibit was assembled from items in the Transportation Library's collections.
