= Charles Siepmann =

British-born media scholar and policy advocate

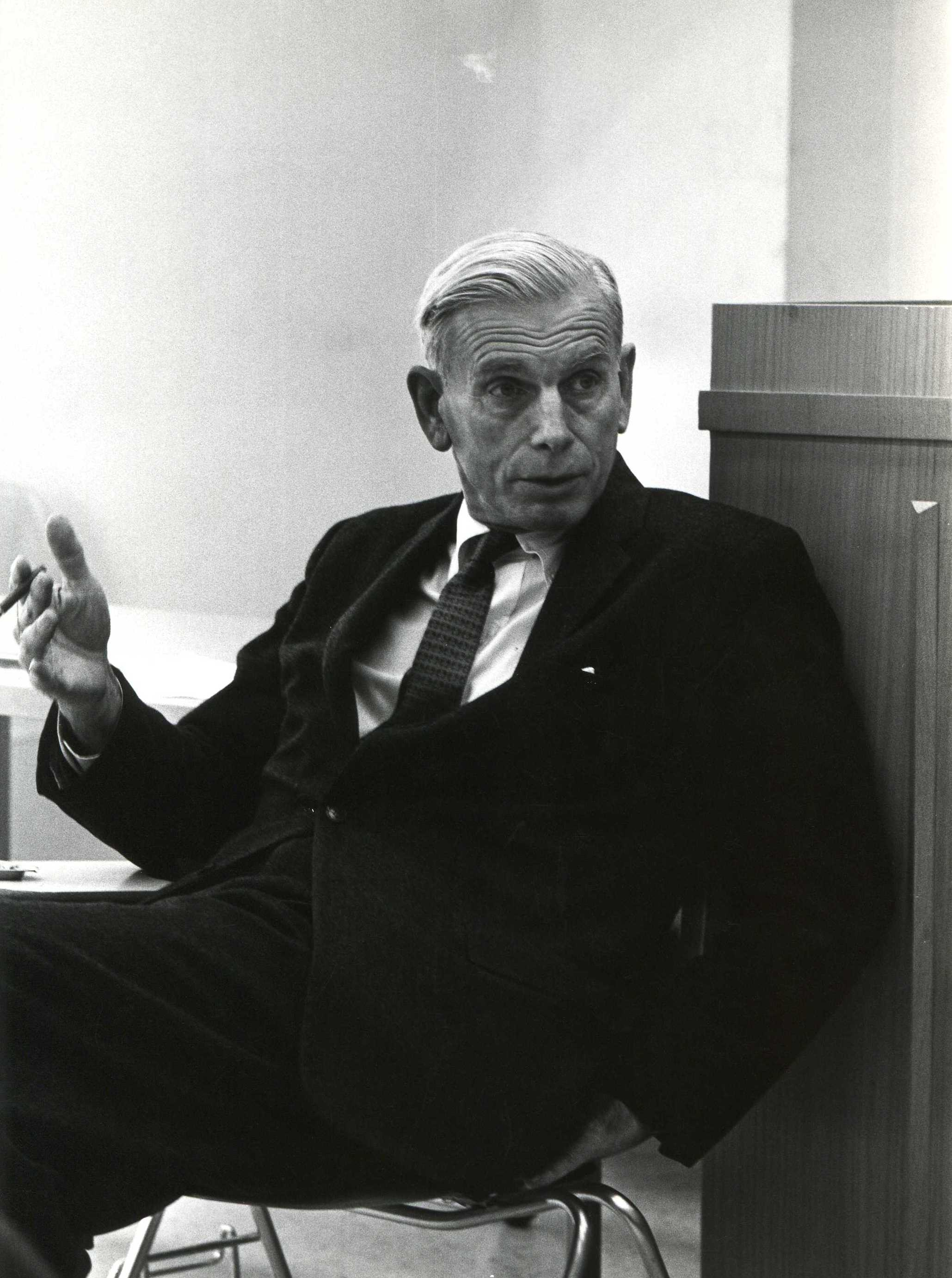
- Professor Siepmann
- Born: 1899; Bristol, England
- Died: 1985 (aged 85–86); London
- Occupation: Professor
- Relatives: John Houseman (stepbrother)

Charles Siepmann (1899–1985) was a British-born media scholar and policy advocate who spent much of his career in the United States where he was a professor at New York University's graduate communication program for over two decades. Siepmann was instrumental in drafting the FCC document "Public Service Responsibility of Broadcast Licensees", which became known as the "Blue Book" for its distinctive colour. Though he was an academic, Siepmann remained an advocate for the democratic potentials of radio and television and was "overtly political and engaged with media policy interventions" during his career. His advocacy was met with a "storm of protest in the [broadcast] industry" and he was frequently red-baited for his views.

== Biography ==
=== Early life ===
Siepmann was born in 1899 in Bristol, England, and served in the First World War. After the war he began working for the BBC where he advocated and developed educational programming. He succeeded Hilda Matheson as head of Talks in 1931. In 1937, after twelve years at the BBC, where he had "fallen foul of power struggles in the upper echelons of BBC management", Siepmann left for the United States. As part of a Rockefeller Foundation grant to study educational broadcasting in the United States, Siepmann "visited key educational broadcast stations across the country". Subsequently, he was offered a job at Harvard University where he worked until 1942, at which point he left to join the US Office for War Information.

=== Work at the FCC ===
In 1946, FCC commissioner Clifford Durr employed Siepmann to draft a report on broadcasters' public service responsibilities and performance. This document, "Public Service Responsibility of Broadcast Licensees", relied on data collected by Dallas Smythe, and later became known as the "Blue Book". The book was highly critical of US broadcasters and ignited a storm of controversy. While broadcasters were vehemently opposed to the book's findings, The New York Times stated that it was "required reading for all interested in the future development of one of the country's major media for mass communications". Most controversial was the book's advocation that FCC mandates would require that "broadcasters devote a certain amount of time to local, non-profit, and experimental programming while also cutting down on 'excessive advertising'".

=== Academic career ===
In 1946, Siepmann began working at NYU as Chair of the Department of Communications in Education and as Director of NYU's film library. Siepmann remained at NYU until 1968, at which point he became a professor emeritus. He then went to Sarah Lawrence College, where he continued to teach until 1972. Even after leaving the classroom, Siepmann continued to host students at his farm in Vermont, and was well-regarded by his pupils.

=== Academic Scholarship ===
Siepmann generated a large amount of writing during his career, both in scholarly and popular venues. His writing "typically focused on broadcast media's normative role in a democratic society, with a recurring focus of the degradations of excessive advertising and commercialism". Siepmann wrote six books, and in addition to the Blue Book is best known for Radio's Second Chance (1946), The Radio Listener's Bill of Rights: Democracy, Radio and You (1948), and Radio, Television and Society (1950). In Radio's Second Chance, he made the case that opportunities which were lost with AM radio could be reclaimed with the new FM technology. In The Radio Listener's Bill of Rights, Siepmann contributed to the media reform movement and "described three major impediments to actualizing the democratic prospects of radio: public ignorance, indifference, and inertia". Radio, Television, and Society was the most academic of Siepmann's major works and "focused on questions about the theories, laws, policies, and practices underlying freedom of speech, and its relationship to broadcasting". In addition to books, Siepmann published considerable work in various academic journals including Studies in Philosophy and Social Science, Public Opinion Quarterly, and the Yale Law Journal.

=== Marriage and children ===
Siepmann was married to Charlotte “Dolly” Tyler in 1942 with whom he had two daughters and a son.

== Published works ==
1942: Radio in wartime

1946: Radio's second chance

1946: Propaganda and information in international affairs

1948: The radio listener's bill of rights; democracy, radio and you

1950: Radio, television and society

1951: The problem of individuality in an age of mass communication

1951: Aspects of broadcasting in Canada. In: Royal Commission on National Development in the Arts, Letters and Sciences, (Massey Commission) Report. King's printer, Ottawa 1951, Appendix 6

1952: Television and education in the United States

1953: Collection and analysis of prevailing criticisms of television programming

1958: TV and our school crisis

1959: The role and scope of television in education

1960: Communications and education

1968: The Fairness doctrine : a dissenting critique

== See also ==
- Blue Book
- Communication studies
- Federal Communications Commission
