= Broadcasting reform in the United States =

Broadcasting reform in the United States has a long history beginning in the 1930s. During the 1940s discontent with commercial media, especially radio, was widespread in the United States with the chief complaints centering on media monopolies, advertising and lack of local accountability. Advanced by the contemporary civil rights and antiwar movements, broadcasting reform efforts of the 1960s were undertaken by various organizations at the local and national level including the American Council for Better Broadcasts (ACBB), Action for Children's Television (ACT), Citizens Communication Center (CCC), National Citizens Committee for Broadcasting (NCBB) and the Office of Communications of the United Church of Christ (UCC).

== Background ==
American media has developed through policy confrontations between commercial industry representatives, grassroots activists and regulators in Washington D.C. about both the design and purpose of media institutions. During the 1930s and 1940s reform was driven by progressives, left wing radicals and New Deal liberals. Reformers sought to use state institutions to protect the media's public service responsibilities from commercialism. Though unsuccessful, reformers in the 1930s sought a more public-oriented broadcast. Reform efforts continued in the 1940s; as dissent amongst citizen groups increased so did pressure on broadcasters and the FCC who were inundated by letter-writing campaigns, petitions, and call-ins seeking the "democratization" of public airwaves. These efforts led to the establishment of the Fairness Doctrine in 1949. In the 1960s when social movements like the antiwar and civil rights movements advanced media reform efforts.

== History ==
The Communications Act of 1934 combined earlier regulatory provisions governing broadcasting and telecommunications; many of its terms closely approximated the Calvin Coolidge era Radio Act of 1927 that had emerged from a period of industry pressure during the four National Radio Conferences between 1922 and 1925. The Radio Act had fallen into a state of obsolescence due to its perceived failure to address contemporary concerns about network dominance and commercial advertising. The 1934 Act did not change these earlier provisions, which were not seen as a threat to industry interests, but it broadened their scope to encompass telephone and telegraph. It also strengthened the administrative structure of the FCC.

=== 1940s ===
Against the backdrop of a post New Deal rightward political shift in the 1940s, public criticism of radio broadcasting in the United States was intense. Numerous groups including the ACLU, women's groups and Jewish organizations became involved in reform efforts. The New York Times published in 1946 that "radio is subjected to more obverse and insistent criticism than the industry had experienced in the whole of its previous twenty-five years", in another article describing it as "articulate disgust". Fortune Magazine called it a "revolt against radio" in 1947.

Broadcasting was still in its infancy during those years and the outcome of early policy disputes helped shaped the media landscape. NBC was forced by the FCC to divest itself of the Blue Network, which went on to become ABC. Published in 1946, the FCC Blue Book detailed the lack of diversity in contemporary radio broadcasting and seeks to define the "public interest" by outlining various public service responsibilities of broadcasters such as experimental noncommercial programming, more local news and the public service responsibilities of broadcasters. Listener councils were founded in Cleveland, Columbus, central Wisconsin, northern California and New York City with the goal of representing members at public hearings before the FCC or during license renewal proceedings.

The listener council model never proved as successful as reformers had hoped but reform efforts continued throughout the 1940s. The radio spectrum was viewed by some as a public resource rather than a primarily commercial one and there were various efforts to insert political messages into commercial broadcasts. The CIO's Radio Handbook instructed labor activists in media tactics and promoted the idea that "Labor has a voice, the people have a right to hear it". They argued "the air over which the broadcasts are being made does not belong to companies or corporations." However, Cold War politics prevailed and red-baiting tactics proved effective to silence reformers.

=== 1960s ===
Prior to 1966 the FCC did not allow members of the public to be represented at administrative licensing proceedings, until the DC circuit Court of Appeals ruled that the FCC was required to allow citizen participation in these proceedings. Following the United Church of Christ vs WLBT decision numerous broadcast reform groups were formed to promote the interests of groups who felt they were excluded or marginalized by television, including Media Committee of the National Organization for Women (NOW), the Chinese for Affirmative Action (CAA) and the National Black Media Coalition (NBMC).

== Major issues ==
The reform movement has directed significant efforts to the meaning of the public interest standard seeking to include within that standard the rights of audiences, and public access and participation, but reformer attempts to redefine the fundamental purpose of broadcasting has been hampered by the public policy commitment to maintain a private, commercial and network oriented broadcasting industry.

Other major issues have included the rules for license renewals, the Fairness Doctrine, cable television, advertising, media concentration and deregulation.

== See also ==
- Media reform
