= West African Journalists Association =

The West African Journalists Association (WAJA) is a sub regional organization that is created to represent journalists' associations and unions in 16 countries. The union operates in 16 countries that make up Economic Community of West Africa States (ECOWAS). The association was founded in 1986, in Darkar, Senegal.

== Objectives ==
WAJA was created for the defense of Journalists and their practices among the 16 member state that form the union. They defend and promote freedom of the press, consolidation of fundamental human rights and freedom of expression, and to encourage and promote solidarity bond among journalists in West Africa and the International community of journalists.

WAJA works to ensure that there is a standard in journalism practice and they ensure journalists follow and maintain the standard. They encourage journalists to stick to the rules of engagement in journalism practice which are codes of ethics, to preserve the rights of the public, to ensure honesty and accuracy in their reporting and dissemination of information, to work for media liberation among member state and promote access to public information.

== Activities ==
WAJA has reminded political leaders in the sub-region of their obligations to provide safety for journalists during the discharge of their duties under various regional and international instruments.

WAJA brings together journalists' associations/unions in all the fifteen countries in West Africa.

The representatives and leaders of members of the union of the West African Journalists Association (WAJA) have also called for an improved service condition for journalists and a renewed commitment to the safety and labor rights of journalists in the sub-region. The call was made during a two-day conference in Cotonou, Benin, from 22 to 23 July 2014 in collaboration with the International Federation of Journalists (IFJ) and supported by Friedrich Ebert Stiftung (FES).
