= Warren Weaver =

American mathematician (1894–1978)

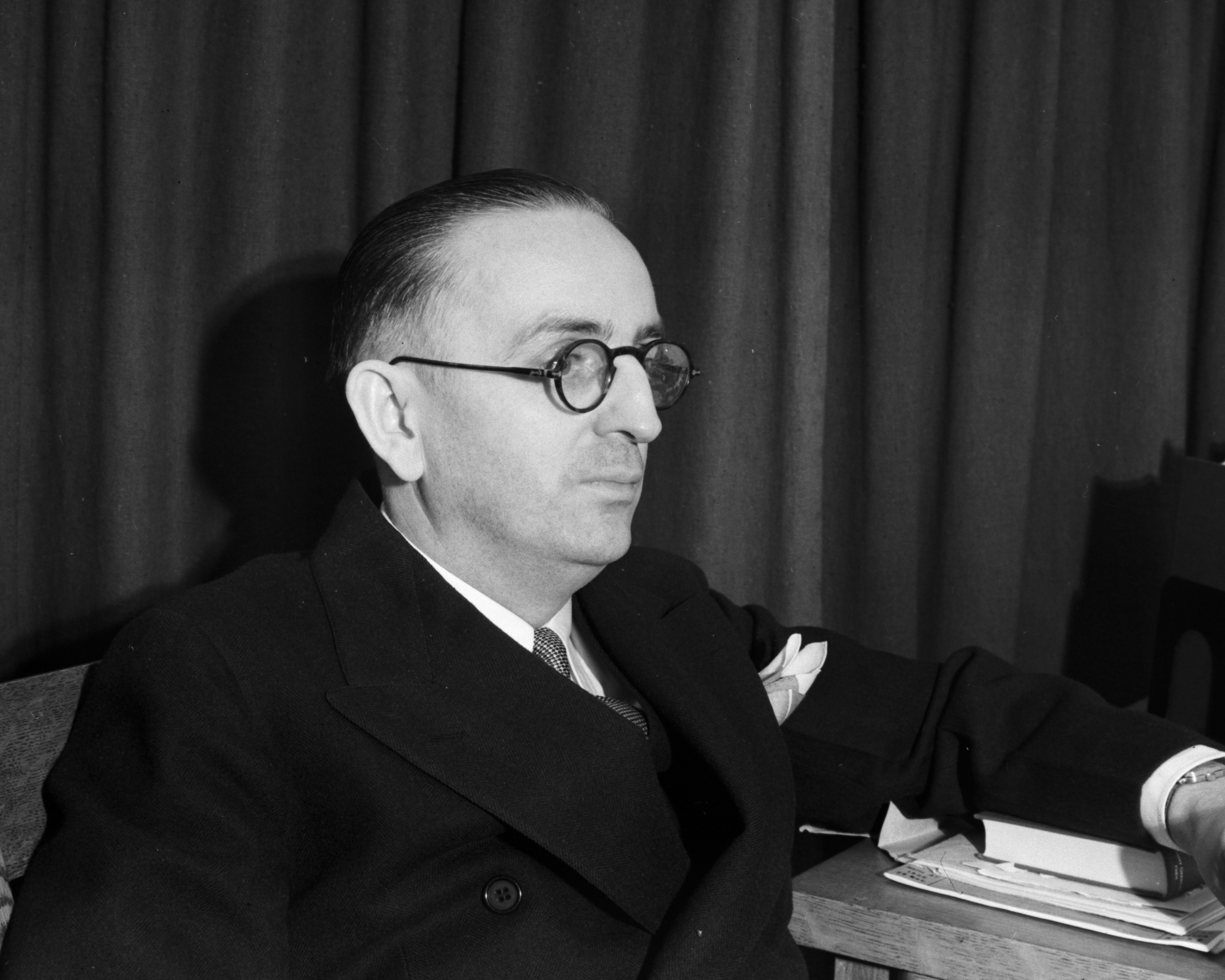
- Born: July 17, 1894; Reedsburg, Wisconsin, US
- Died: November 24, 1978 (aged 84); New Milford, Connecticut, US
- Occupations: Scientist, mathematician
- Known for: Shannon–Weaver model Mason–Weaver equation Machine translation Statistical semantics
- Awards: Kalinga Prize (1964)

Warren Weaver (July 17, 1894 – November 24, 1978) was an American scientist, mathematician, and science administrator. He is widely recognized as one of the pioneers of machine translation and as an important figure in creating support for science in the United States.

== Career ==
Weaver received three degrees from the University of Wisconsin–Madison: a Bachelor of Science in 1916, a civil engineering degree in 1917, and a Ph.D. in 1921. He became an assistant professor of mathematics at Throop College (now California Institute of Technology). He served as a second lieutenant in the Air Service during World War I. After the war, he returned to teach mathematics at Wisconsin (1920–32).

Weaver was also given an honorary LLD degree from the University of Wisconsin-Madison and a Doctor of Science degree from the University of São Paulo.

Weaver was director of the Division of Natural Sciences at the Rockefeller Foundation (1932–55), and was science consultant (1947–51), trustee (1954), and vice president (from 1958) at the Sloan-Kettering Institute for Cancer Research. His chief researches were in the problems of communication in science and in the mathematical theory of probability and statistics.

At the Rockefeller Foundation, he was responsible for approving grants for major projects in molecular engineering and genetics, in agriculture (particularly for developing new strains of wheat and rice), and in medical research.

During World War II, he was seconded from the foundation to head the Applied Mathematics Panel at the U.S. Office of Scientific Research and Development, directing the work of mathematicians in operations research with the assistance of Mina Rees. He was familiar with the development of electronic calculating machines and the successful application of mathematical and statistical techniques in cryptography.

He has served as a member of the Department of War's Research Advisory Panel and the Naval Research Advisory Committee.

Weaver was elected to the American Philosophical Society in 1944.

He was president of the American Association for the Advancement of Science in 1954 and chairman of the board in 1955, a member or chairman of numerous boards and committees, and the primary author of the Arden House Statement, a 1951 declaration of principle and guide to setting the association's goals, plans, and procedures. He also served as vice-president of the board of trustees of the Academy of Religion and Mental Health and chairman of the board of the Salk Institute of Biological Studies. He was elected to the American Academy of Arts and Sciences in 1958. The National Academy of Sciences chose him to be a member in 1969.

When Claude Shannon's 1948 articles on communication theory were republished in 1949 as The Mathematical Theory of Communication, the book also republished a much shorter article authored by Weaver, which discusses the implications of Shannon's more technical work for a general audience.

With Max Mason, he co-authored the book The Electromagnetic Field, first published in 1929 and re-issued in 1959. He also authored the books Lady Luck: The Theory of Probability, first published in 1963 and republished in 1982, Elementary Mathematical Analysis, and an autobiography called Scene of Change.

The home of the Courant Institute at New York University is Warren Weaver Hall.

== The "Translation" memorandum ==
One naturally wonders if the problem of translation could conceivably be treated as a problem in cryptography. When I look at an article in Russian, I say: 'This is really written in English, but it has been coded in some strange symbols. I will now proceed to decode.

— Warren Weaver, Letter to Norbert Wiener, March 4, 1947

Weaver had first mentioned the possibility of using digital computers to translate documents between natural human languages in March 1947 in a letter to the cyberneticist Norbert Wiener. In the following two years, he had been urged by his colleagues at the Rockefeller Foundation to elaborate on his ideas. The result was a memorandum, entitled simply "Translation", which he wrote in July 1949 at Carlsbad, New Mexico.

Said to be probably the single most influential publication in the early days of machine translation, it formulated goals and methods before most people had any idea of what computers might be capable of, and was the direct stimulus for the beginnings of research first in the United States and then later, indirectly, throughout the world. The impact of Weaver's memorandum is attributable not only to his widely recognized expertise in mathematics and computing, but also, and perhaps even more, to the influence he enjoyed with major policy-makers in U.S. government agencies.

Weaver's memorandum was designed to suggest more fruitful methods than any simplistic word-for-word approach, which had grave limitations. He put forward four proposals. The first was that the problem of multiple meanings might be tackled by the examination of immediate context. For example, the English word fast has at least two meanings which we can paraphrase as rapid or motionless. If we wish to translate an English text, it is likely that these two senses of fast correspond to different words in the target language, and in order to translate the word correctly one needs to know which sense is intended. Weaver proposed that this problem could be solved by looking at the words that occur in the vicinity of the word to be translated, and he conjectured that the number of context words that would be required is fairly small.

The second proposal in the memorandum was inspired by work on an early type of neural networks by McCulloch and Pitts. Weaver interpreted these results as meaning that given a set of premises, any logical conclusion could be deduced automatically by computer. To the extent that human language has a logical basis, Weaver hypothesized that translation could be addressed as a problem of formal logic, deducing "conclusions" in the target language from "premises" in the source language.

The third proposal was that cryptographic methods were possibly applicable to translation. If we want to translate, say, a Russian text into English, we can take the Russian original as an encrypted version of the English plaintext. Weaver was especially impressed with the potential of Shannon's classified work on cryptography and Information theory from World War II.

Finally, the fourth proposal was that there may also be linguistic universals underlying all human languages which could be exploited to make the problem of translation more straightforward. Weaver argued for this position using a metaphor: "Think, by analogy, of individuals living in a series of tall closed towers, all erected over a common foundation. When they try to communicate with one another, they shout back and forth, each from his own closed tower. It is difficult to make the sound penetrate even the nearest towers, and communication proceeds very poorly indeed. But, when an individual goes down his tower, he finds himself in a great open basement, common to all the towers. Here he establishes easy and useful communication with the persons who have also descended from their towers". He was inspired by Erwin Reifler, who in 1948 presented a paper entitled "the Chinese Language in the Light of Comparative Semantics" at the American Philosophical Society annual conference. The abstract of the paper was published by Science in the same year, which was referred to in the memorandum.

Weaver's memorandum triggered immediate action from the part of other MT specialists. One of the first people on the scene was Erwin Reifler, mentioned in the memorandum itself. In a study published in January 1950, he put forward the idea of pre- and post-editing with the assumption that fully automated translation can only be done on the basis of word-for-word substitutions, which would cause inadequacies and errors in the generated translation. His suggestion for eliminating the problem was implementing a human pre-editor with the knowledge of the output language, who would add additional symbols for grammatical, lexical and logical correctness. The post editor, in turn, would have the task of rendering the text generated by MT reasonable and logical; ideally, he would have the knowledge of the source language.

== Advocate for science ==
Weaver understood how greatly the tools and techniques of physics and chemistry could advance knowledge of biological processes, and used his position in the Rockefeller Foundation to identify, support, and encourage the young scientists who years later earned Nobel Prizes and other honours for their contributions to genetics or molecular biology.

== Religious beliefs ==
In her official National Academy of Sciences biographical memoir for Warren, Mina Rees states: “Religion was a major enthusiasm after his family, which came first, and his work, which came second. From earliest childhood, church was a family ritual, and in adulthood, it had become a cherished part of Sunday's special quality. For years there seemed to be no need to question the interrelationship between science and religion; each played an important role in Weaver's life, but he felt no conflict between them. When he decided in the 1950s that he should examine the conflict many other people did feel, his conclusion was that he could find none between a properly humble science and a properly intelligent religion. He became the scientist par excellence who was often invited to speak at churches and at religious gatherings. Whenever he published an article on this subject, it was widely reprinted. One article, "A Scientist Ponders Faith", was published in the Saturday Review of January 3, 1959, and was reprinted by nine other publications during the next two years. Weaver was convinced that there was a permanent core of truth in religion as there is in science and that religious ideas, like scientific ones, evolve with the acquisition of new knowledge. He was perfectly comfortable with his conclusions, realizing full well that they did not conform with the bulk of religious opinion.”

== Awards ==
Weaver was awarded the Public Welfare Medal by the National Academy of Sciences in 1957. In 1965, he was awarded the first Arches of Science Medal for outstanding contributions to the public understanding of the meaning of science to contemporary men and women, and UNESCO's Kalinga Prize for distinguished contributions to the popular understanding of science.

He also received the Medal for Merit, a position as an officer in the Legion of Honour, and the King's Medal for Service in the Cause of Freedom.

== Other interests ==
Weaver was fascinated by Lewis Carroll's Alice's Adventures in Wonderland. In 1964, having built up a collection of 160 versions in 42 languages, Weaver wrote a book about the translation history of Alice, called Alice in Many Tongues: The Translations of Alice in Wonderland. Among other features, it provides excerpts from the business correspondence of the author, Lewis Carroll (the Reverend Charles Dodgson), dealing with publishing royalties and permissions as Alice's fame snowballed worldwide. Ever the scientist, even in the area of literature, Weaver devised a design for evaluating the quality of the various translations, focusing on the nonsense, puns and logical jokes in the Mad Tea-Party scene. His range of contacts provided an impressive if eccentric list of collaborators in the evaluation exercise, including anthropologist Margaret Mead (for the South Pacific Pidgin translation), longtime Jerusalem mayor Teddy Kollek, and Nobel laureate biochemist Hugo Theorell (Swedish). The book Alice in a World of Wonderlands (2015) continues and updates Weaver's endeavour, analyzing Alice translations in 174 languages in a similar vein.
