= Mason–Weaver equation =

The Mason–Weaver equation (named after Max Mason and Warren Weaver) describes the sedimentation and diffusion of solutes under a uniform force, usually a gravitational field. Assuming that the gravitational field is aligned in the z direction (Fig. 1), the Mason–Weaver equation may be written

$$\frac{\partial c}{\partial t} =
D \frac{\partial^{2}c}{\partial z^{2}} +
sg \frac{\partial c}{\partial z}$$

where t is the time, c is the solute concentration (moles per unit length in the z-direction), and the parameters D, s, and g represent the solute diffusion constant, sedimentation coefficient and the (presumed constant) acceleration of gravity, respectively.

The Mason–Weaver equation is complemented by the boundary conditions
$$D \frac{\partial c}{\partial z} + s g c = 0$$
at the top and bottom of the cell, denoted as $z_a$ and $z_b$, respectively (Fig. 1). These boundary conditions correspond to the physical requirement that no solute pass through the top and bottom of the cell, i.e., that the flux there be zero. The cell is assumed to be rectangular and aligned with the Cartesian axes (Fig. 1), so that the net flux through the side walls is likewise zero. Hence, the total amount of solute in the cell
$$N_\text{tot} = \int_{z_b}^{z_a} \, dz \ c(z, t)$$
is conserved, i.e., $dN_\text{tot}/dt = 0$.

== Derivation of the Mason–Weaver equation ==
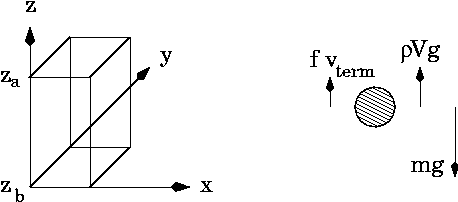
Figure 1: Diagram of Mason–Weaver cell and Forces on Solute

A typical particle of mass m moving with vertical velocity v is acted upon by three forces (Fig. 1): the drag force $f v$, the force of gravity $m g$ and the buoyant force $\rho V g$, where g is the acceleration of gravity, V is the solute particle volume and $\rho$ is the solvent density. At equilibrium (typically reached in roughly 10 ns for molecular solutes), the particle attains a terminal velocity $v_\text{term}$ where the three forces are balanced. Since V equals the particle mass m times its partial specific volume $\bar{\nu}$, the equilibrium condition may be written as

$$f v_\text{term} = m (1 - \bar{\nu} \rho) g \ \stackrel{\mathrm{def}}{=}\  m_b g$$

where $m_b$ is the buoyant mass.

We define the Mason–Weaver sedimentation coefficient $s \ \stackrel{\mathrm{def}}{=}\ m_b / f = v_\text{term}/g$. Since the drag coefficient f is related to the diffusion constant D by the Einstein relation

$$D = \frac{k_B T} f$$,

the ratio of s and D equals

$$\frac{s}{D} = \frac{m_b}{k_B T}$$

where $k_B$ is the Boltzmann constant and T is the temperature in kelvins.

The flux J at any point is given by

$$J = -D \frac{\partial c}{\partial z} - v_\text{term} c
= -D \frac{\partial c}{\partial z} - s g c.$$

The first term describes the flux due to diffusion down a concentration gradient, whereas the second term describes the convective flux due to the average velocity $v_\text{term}$ of the particles. A positive net flux out of a small volume produces a negative change in the local concentration within that volume

$$\frac{\partial c}{\partial t} = -\frac{\partial J}{\partial z}.$$

Substituting the equation for the flux J produces the Mason–Weaver equation

$$\frac{\partial c}{\partial t} =
D \frac{\partial^{2}c}{\partial z^{2}} +
sg \frac{\partial c}{\partial z}.$$

== The dimensionless Mason–Weaver equation ==
The parameters D, s and g determine a length scale $z_0$

$$z_0 \ \stackrel{\mathrm{def}}{=}\  \frac{D}{sg}$$

and a time scale $t_0$

$$t_0 \ \stackrel{\mathrm{def}}{=}\  \frac{D}{s^{2}g^{2}}$$

Defining the dimensionless variables $\zeta \ \stackrel{\mathrm{def}}{=}\ z/z_0$ and $\tau \ \stackrel{\mathrm{def}}{=}\ t/t_0$, the Mason–Weaver equation becomes

$$\frac{\partial c}{\partial \tau} =
\frac{\partial^{2} c}{\partial \zeta^{2}} +
\frac{\partial c}{\partial \zeta}$$

subject to the boundary conditions

$$\frac{\partial c}{\partial \zeta} + c = 0$$
at the top and bottom of the cell, $\zeta_a$ and $\zeta_b$, respectively.

== Solution of the Mason–Weaver equation ==
This partial differential equation may be solved by separation of variables. Defining $c(\zeta,\tau) \ \stackrel{\mathrm{def}}{=}\ e^{-\zeta/2} T(\tau) P(\zeta)$, we obtain two ordinary differential equations coupled by a constant $\beta$

$$\frac{dT}{d \tau} + \beta T = 0$$

$$\frac{d^2 P}{d \zeta^2} +
\left[ \beta - \frac 1 4 \right] P = 0$$

where acceptable values of $\beta$ are defined by the boundary conditions

$$\frac{dP}{d\zeta} + \frac{1}{2} P = 0$$

at the upper and lower boundaries, $\zeta_a$ and $\zeta_b$, respectively. Since the T equation has the solution $T(\tau) = T_0 e^{-\beta \tau}$, where $T_0$ is a constant, the Mason–Weaver equation is reduced to solving for the function $P(\zeta)$.

The ordinary differential equation for P and its boundary conditions satisfy the criteria for a Sturm–Liouville problem, from which several conclusions follow. First, there is a discrete set of orthonormal eigenfunctions $P_k(\zeta)$ that satisfy the ordinary differential equation and boundary conditions. Second, the corresponding eigenvalues $\beta_k$ are real, bounded below by a lowest eigenvalue $\beta_0$ and grow asymptotically like $k^{2}$ where the nonnegative integer k is the rank of the eigenvalue. (In our case, the lowest eigenvalue is zero, corresponding to the equilibrium solution.) Third, the eigenfunctions form a complete set; any solution for $c(\zeta, \tau)$ can be expressed as a weighted sum of the eigenfunctions

$$c(\zeta, \tau) =
\sum_{k=0}^\infty c_k P_k(\zeta) e^{-\beta_k\tau}$$

where $c_k$ are constant coefficients determined from the initial distribution $c(\zeta, \tau=0)$

$$c_k =
\int_{\zeta_a}^{\zeta_b} d\zeta \
c(\zeta, \tau{=}0) e^{\zeta/2} P_k(\zeta)$$

At equilibrium, $\beta=0$ (by definition) and the equilibrium concentration distribution is

$$e^{-\zeta/2} P_0(\zeta) = B e^{-\zeta} = B e^{-m_b gz/k_B T}$$

which agrees with the Boltzmann distribution. The $P_0(\zeta)$ function satisfies the ordinary differential equation and boundary conditions at all values of $\zeta$ (as may be verified by substitution), and the constant B may be determined from the total amount of solute

$$B = N_\text{tot} \, \frac{sg} D \,
\frac 1 {e^{-\zeta_b} - e^{-\zeta_a}}$$

To find the non-equilibrium values of the eigenvalues $\beta_k$, we proceed as follows. The P equation has the form of a simple harmonic oscillator with solutions $P(\zeta) = e^{i\omega_k\zeta}$ where

$$\omega_k = \pm \sqrt{\beta_k - \frac 1 4}$$

Depending on the value of $\beta_k$, $\omega_k$ is either purely real ($\beta_k\geq\frac 1 4$) or purely imaginary ($\beta_k < \frac 1 4$). Only one purely imaginary solution can satisfy the boundary conditions, namely, the equilibrium solution. Hence, the non-equilibrium eigenfunctions can be written as

$$P(\zeta) = A \cos{\omega_k \zeta} + B \sin{\omega_k \zeta}$$

where A and B are constants and $\omega$ is real and strictly positive.

By introducing the oscillator amplitude $\rho$ and phase $\varphi$ as new variables,

$$u \ \stackrel{\mathrm{def}}{=}\  \rho \sin(\varphi) \ \stackrel{\mathrm{def}}{=}\  P$$

$$v \ \stackrel{\mathrm{def}}{=}\  \rho \cos(\varphi) \ \stackrel{\mathrm{def}}{=}\  - \frac 1 \omega
\left( \frac{dP}{d\zeta} \right)$$

$$\rho \ \stackrel{\mathrm{def}}{=}\  u^2 + v^2$$

$$\tan(\varphi) \ \stackrel{\mathrm{def}}{=}\  \frac{v}{u}$$

the second-order equation for P is factored into two simple first-order equations

$$\frac{d\rho}{d\zeta} = 0$$

$$\frac{d\varphi}{d\zeta} = \omega$$

Remarkably, the transformed boundary conditions are independent of $\rho$ and the endpoints $\zeta_a$ and $\zeta_b$

$$\tan(\varphi_a) =
\tan(\varphi_b) = \frac 1 {2\omega_k}$$

Therefore, we obtain an equation

$$\varphi_a - \varphi_b + k\pi = k\pi =
\int_{\zeta_b}^{\zeta_a} d\zeta \ \frac{d\varphi}{d\zeta} =
\omega_k (\zeta_a - \zeta_b)$$

giving an exact solution for the frequencies $\omega_k$

$$\omega_k = \frac{k\pi}{\zeta_a - \zeta_b}$$

The eigenfrequencies $\omega_k$ are positive as required, since $\zeta_a > \zeta_b$, and comprise the set of harmonics of the fundamental frequency $\omega_1 \ \stackrel{\mathrm{def}}{=}\ \pi/(\zeta_a - \zeta_b)$. Finally, the eigenvalues $\beta_k$ can be derived from $\omega_k$

$$\beta_k = \omega_k^2 + \frac 1 4$$

Taken together, the non-equilibrium components of the solution correspond to a Fourier series decomposition of the initial concentration distribution $c(\zeta, \tau=0)$ multiplied by the weighting function $e^{\zeta/2}$. Each Fourier component decays independently as $e^{-\beta_k\tau}$, where $\beta_k$ is given above in terms of the Fourier series frequencies $\omega_k$.

== See also ==
- Lamm equation
- The Archibald approach, and a simpler presentation of the basic physics of the Mason–Weaver equation than the original.
