= Code of ethics in media =

Code of ethics that multiple forms of media follow

The code of ethics in media was created by a suggestion from the 1947 Hutchins Commission. They suggested that newspapers, broadcasters and journalists had started to become more responsible for journalism and thought they should be held accountable.

== Original guidelines ==
The guidelines were set up around two important ideas. The first guideline is that "whoever enjoys a special measure of freedom, like a professional journalist, has an obligation to society to use their freedoms and powers responsibly." This guideline is useful so that people in power are able to be held liable in case their actions are not professional. People that have high media attention should not abuse the power. The second guideline that was established is "society's welfare is paramount, more important than individual careers or even individual rights." Again, may cause a manipulation to the truth of a story holding people responsible for their actions and stating that society is more important due to the vast number of people that could be affected by poor behavior.

The Hutchins Commission added another five guidelines specifically for the press.

1. "Present meaningful news, accurate and separated from opinion."
2. "Serve as a forum for the exchange of comment and criticism and to expand access to diverse points of view."
3. "Project a representative picture of the constituent groups in society by avoiding stereotypes by including minority groups."
4. "Clarify the goals and values of society; implicit was an appeal to avoid pandering to the lowest common denominator."
5. "Give broad coverage of what was known about society."

All of these guidelines are important because the press is needed to maintain a neutral viewpoint, providing the basic facts and allowing for readers to come up with their own opinions from the news that they report.

These guidelines provide the frame work and inspiration for the Fourth Estate's Journalism Code of Practice and the Society of Professional Journalists Code of Ethics.

== Fourth Estate: Journalism Code of Practice ==
The Fourth Estate offers a clear and detailed Code of Practice for anyone seeking to create ethical, principled journalism, regardless of their background, employment status, or means of delivery. This code is equally relevant for professional journalists and for those outside the profession who are seeking to report honestly and fairly on the events and issues relevant to their community.

=== Accuracy ===
Accuracy is the overriding value of journalism.

- Ensure that all the facts in your work are accurate.
- Do not omit facts that are material to an understanding of what you are reporting on.
- Context is often critical to accurate reporting. Ensure that adequate context is provided.
- Clearly distinguish between fact and assertion or opinion.

=== Independence ===
Independence from state control, business interests, market forces, or any other vested interest or outside pressure is a hallmark of dispassionate, critical, and reliable journalism. It bolsters legitimacy and credibility in the eyes of the public.

- Make your own editorial judgments based solely on careful consideration of all the facts.
- Do not allow yourself to be influenced by political, sectional, or commercial interests.
- Declare and manage any conflicts of interest, including gifts, funding, advertising relationships, and free or discounted travel or services.

=== Impartiality ===
Impartiality means not being prejudiced towards or against any particular ideology, idea, or preconception. Impartiality requires fairness and balance that follows the weight of evidence: it allows the journalist to make sense of events through dispassionate analysis of all relevant facts and perspectives.

- Treat all facts the same, making editorial judgments and delivering analysis based only on the weight of evidence.
- Do not allow your own views, preferences, biases, or prejudgments to affect your work. Set them aside.
- Do not simply recite lists of facts or engage in false balance: weigh the evidence and reflect that weight of evidence in your work.
- Aim to include an appropriate diversity of views, and accord those views the space warranted by their prominence and significance.

=== Integrity ===
Integrity in journalism ensures that people and organizations uphold the values of journalism, always strive to do the right thing in all situations, even to their personal or organizational detriment, and put their obligations to the public first.

- Treat those you deal with in your work with respect and courtesy.
- Always identify yourself as a journalist, unless withholding disclosure is essential to uncovering the truth in a matter of public importance.
- As far as possible, look for opportunities to "show your workings", sharing with the public the underlying information you have gathered.
- The use of any form of secret information gathering (hidden cameras, secret recording devices, etc.) may be justifiable if it is essential to uncovering the truth in a matter of public importance.
- Provide anyone accused of misbehavior a reasonable opportunity to respond.
- Attribute information to its source unless that source needs to be protected to ensure the truth can be uncovered in a matter of public importance. Where a source needs anonymity, provide it.
- Do not plagiarize.

=== Harm minimization ===
Journalists must always remember that they are dealing with human lives. The potential for public good must sufficiently outweigh the potential for harm that may come from the activity of journalism.

- Be mindful that your work may contain content that causes harm. Carefully consider how you proceed to ensure that undue harm is not caused.
- Avoid the gratuitous use of offensive, confronting, or harm-inducing sounds, imagery, or words.
- Respect people's reasonable rights to privacy unless they are outweighed by the need to report on a matter of public importance.
- Show sensitivity when dealing with children, victims of crime, or people who are especially vulnerable due, for example, to trauma, injury, illness, or other factors.

=== Engagement ===
Engagement with the public ensures that journalism remains open, accessible, collaborative, and participatory while keeping the journalist accountable to the highest standards of accuracy, independence, impartiality, and integrity.

- Your decisions on what work to do should be based on what is relevant and newsworthy to the community you serve.
- Establish and maintain open communications with the community.
- Seek input and ideas from the community before, during, and after completing your work.

=== Accountability ===
Accountability is essential to the ethical practice of journalism and the maintenance of the public trust. Being accountable for news-gathering practices and reporting means making firm commitments and taking responsibility for your journalism and the journalism of your peers.

- Seek and carefully consider the feedback you receive from the community about your work.
- Respond constructively to any complaints, particularly those related to matters raised in relation to these standards.
- Where errors or potentially incomplete or misleading information is found, corrections or clarifications should be made promptly, prominently, and transparently.
- Where no errors or incomplete or misleading information is found, your work should not be altered or removed in any material way in response to pressure from outside interests.

== Society of Professional Journalists' version ==
The Society of Professional Journalists first created its own code of ethics in 1973, which has been revised four times, most recently in 2014. The SPJ code features four principles of ethical journalism:

Seek Truth and Report It "Journalists should be honest, fair, and courageous in gathering, reporting, and interpreting information. Journalists should:

- Take responsibility for the accuracy of their work. Verify information before releasing it. Use original sources whenever possible.
- Remember that neither speed nor format excuses inaccuracy.
- Provide context. Take special care not to misrepresent or oversimplify in promoting, previewing or summarizing a story.
- Gather, update and correct information throughout the life of a news story.
- Be cautious when making promises, but keep the promises they make.
- Identify sources clearly. The public is entitled to as much information as possible to judge the reliability and motivations of sources.
- Consider sources' motives before promising anonymity. Reserve anonymity for sources who may face danger, retribution or other harm, and have information that cannot be obtained elsewhere. Explain why anonymity was granted.
- Diligently seek subjects of news coverage to allow them to respond to criticism or allegations of wrongdoing.
- Avoid undercover or other surreptitious methods of gathering information unless traditional, open methods will not yield information vital to the public.
- Be vigilant and courageous about holding those with power accountable. Give voice to the voiceless.
- Support the open and civil exchange of views, even views they find repugnant.
- Recognize a special obligation to serve as watchdogs over public affairs and government. Seek to ensure that the public's business is conducted in the open, and that public records are open to all.
- Provide access to source material when it is relevant and appropriate.
- Boldly tell the story of the diversity and magnitude of the human experience. Seek sources whose voices we seldom hear.
- Avoid stereotyping. Journalists should examine the ways their values and experiences may shape their reporting.
- Label advocacy and commentary.
- Never deliberately distort facts or context, including visual information. Clearly label illustrations and re-enactments.
- Never plagiarize. Always attribute."

Minimize Harm "Ethical journalists treat sources, subjects, and colleagues as human beings deserving of respect. Journalists should:

- Balance the public's need for information against potential harm or discomfort. Pursuit of the news is not a license for arrogance or undue intrusiveness.
- Show compassion for those who may be affected by news coverage. Use heightened sensitivity when dealing with juveniles, victims of sex crimes, and sources or subjects who are inexperienced or unable to give consent. Consider cultural differences in approach and treatment.
- Recognize that legal access to information differs from an ethical justification to publish or broadcast.
- Realize that private people have a greater right to control information about themselves than public figures and others who seek power, influence or attention. Weigh the consequences of publishing or broadcasting personal information.
- Avoid pandering to lurid curiosity, even if others do.
- Balance a suspect's right to a fair trial with the public's right to know. Consider the implications of identifying criminal suspects before they face legal charges.
- Consider the long-term implications of the extended reach and permanence of publication. Provide updated and more complete information as appropriate."

Act Independently "Journalists should be free of obligation to any interest other than the public's right to know. Journalists should:

- Avoid conflicts of interest, real or perceived. Disclose unavoidable conflicts.
- Refuse gifts, favors, fees, free travel and special treatment, and avoid political and other outside activities that may compromise integrity or impartiality, or may damage credibility.
- Be wary of sources offering information for favors or money; do not pay for access to news. Identify content provided by outside sources, whether paid or not.
- Deny favored treatment to advertisers, donors or any other special interests, and resist internal and external pressure to influence coverage.
- Distinguish news from advertising and shun hybrids that blur the lines between the two. Prominently label sponsored content."

Be Accountable "Journalists are accountable to their readers, listeners, viewers, and each other. Journalists should:

- Explain ethical choices and processes to audiences. Encourage a civil dialogue with the public about journalistic practices, coverage and news content.
- Respond quickly to questions about accuracy, clarity and fairness.
- Acknowledge mistakes and correct them promptly and prominently. Explain corrections and clarifications carefully and clearly.
- Expose unethical conduct in journalism, including within their organizations.
- Abide by the same high standards they expect of others."

== See also ==
- Journalism ethics and standards
- Journalism ethics and standards#Codes of practice
- International Council for Press and Broadcasting
- International Council for Press and Broadcasting#Media Ethics Code
