= Raymond B. Fosdick =

American lawyer (1883–1972)

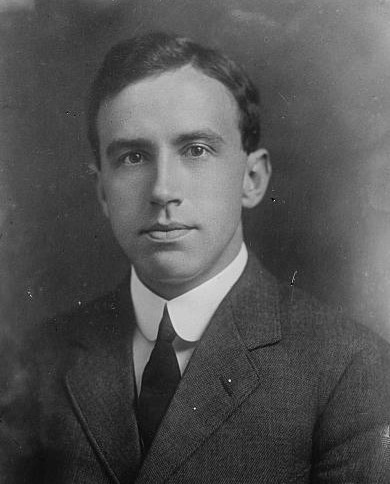
- Fosdick in 1910
- Born: June 9, 1883; Buffalo, New York, U.S.
- Died: July 19, 1972 (aged 89); Newtown, Connecticut, U.S.
- Education: New York Law School
- Occupations: Lawyer, Author, President of the Rockefeller Foundation
- Spouses: Winifred Finlay (m. 1910; died 1932) Elizabeth Miner (m. 1936)
- Children: 2

Raymond Blaine Fosdick (9 June 1883 – 19 July 1972) was an American lawyer, public administrator and author. He served as the fourth president of the Rockefeller Foundation for twelve years (1936–1948). He was an ardent internationalist and supporter of the League of Nations, standing as its Undersecretary in its provisional organisation before resigning after the U.S. Senate's failure to ratify the Covenant of the League of Nations. After stepping down from his position as Undersecretary, he started his law firm and grew closer to John D. Rockefeller Jr., which would lead to a long and fruitful relationship as a friend and adviser. From his position as a trustee on the board of the Rockefeller Foundation as well as numerous other Rockefeller philanthropies, he moved to being the president of the foundation. Fosdick lead the organisation through the difficult years of World War II before retiring and becoming an author, documenting the history of the foundation and Rockefeller Jr.'s life.

Raymond Blaine Fosdick was born on June 9, 1883, in Buffalo, New York, the son of Frank Sheldon Fosdick and Amy Weaver Fosdick. He grew up in a middle class and devoutly religious family. While his older brother Harry went on to become a Baptist clergyman, Raymond grew to question religious teachings, later separating himself from his family's religious beliefs.

He grew up in a household that valued literature and learning highly; with the family often gathering around their living room table, as the children chose books to read from their extensive library. This passion for reading was instilled in Raymond from a young age and carried with him into adulthood. He began apprenticing to become a writer and would go on to publish an extensive list of books throughout his life.

Raymond was educated at Princeton University where he completed his bachelor's degree in 1905. For his master's degree, Fosdick attended New York Law School, graduating in 1908.

== Early career ==
After graduation, Fosdick started his career working as a public investigator for the city of New York before being appointed Commissioner of Accounts. After having had developed a deep admiration for Woodrow Wilson while being a student of his at Princeton University, Fosdick was nominated as auditor and comptroller of the Democratic National Committee in 1912 despite the fact he was a lifelong Republican. The offer came at Wilson's direct request, who told Fosdick in a letter that he would "feel greatly honoured that a former pupil, who has distinguished himself in a position of trust, should turn to me at this time".

Fosdick first met John D. Rockefeller Jr. while investigating the issue of "white slavery" (Mann Act) and prostitution, as the latter was the chairman of the special Grand Jury in Manhattan which was looking into the matter. Rockefeller later hired Fosdick to conduct a study on police systems in Europe on behalf of the Bureau of Social Hygiene. While the Bureau's work tended to focus on the issue of prostitution, Fosdick's goal was to provide an accurate description of the overall policing methods and arrangements implemented in Europe to provide guidelines for future police reform in the United States. This eventually led to the publication of another report by Fosdick on the American police systems, which would remain incomplete until 1920 because of the interruption caused by World War I.

The publication of his reports meant Fosdick began to gain wider public recognition, leading Secretary of War Newton Baker to appoint him as Chairman of the Commission on Training Camp Activities (CTCA) in 1916 during the Mexican border conflict. He was tasked with tackling social hygiene issues in military training camps, such as diseases linked to the ripe prostitution trade and morally corrupt behaviour due to the availability of alcohol. He advocated that Baker should both publicly condemn and act to suppress alcohol and prostitution to clean up troop camps while providing resources for healthier recreational activities like sports. He then went on to serve as special representative for the War Department in France, administering similar prohibitions for troops on the Western Front.

At the end of the First World War, Fosdick became a civilian aide to General John J. Pershing during the Paris Peace Conference of 1919. He was instructed to spend time on the field with American troops and use his expertise to write up reports about their overall morale. Fosdick would subsequently be appointed by President Wilson as Undersecretary to the provisional organisation of the League of Nations, all while being personally concerned that he was not qualified for such an immense task. He would later resign, after less than a year in office due to the U.S. Senate's failure to ratify the Covenant of the League of Nations. Disappointed, he would nevertheless continue to be a strong internationalist public voice in support of the Wilsonian dream of the League of Nations, notably through his function as President of the League of Nations Non Partisan Association.

Fosdick was elected to the American Philosophical Society in 1931.

== Relationship with Rockefeller ==
After leaving his position at the League of Nations, Fosdick established a law firm with two partners, James. C Curtis and Chauncey Belknap, with John D. Rockefeller Jr. being his first client. This marked the beginning of an even closer partnership between the two men.

Fosdick advised Rockefeller Jr. on labour relations in businesses in which he had an interest in. He became chairman of the Industrial Relations Counselors Inc., which attempted to prevent labour relations crises from impacting Rockefeller Jr.'s public image and portray him as a "liberal industrial statesman".

Fosdick used his role as an adviser to Rockefeller to nudge the latter's ardent support for prohibition. He used his position to progressively distance Rockefeller Jr from his association with prohibitionist lobbying groups such as the Anti-Saloon League. Rockefeller was eventually brought round to Fosdick's view on the issue, commissioning him to the Liquor Study committee on alcohol regulation problems.

As a result of his close professional relationship with Rockefeller Jr., Fosdick also served as a trustee on numerous philanthropic organisations linked to the Rockefeller foundation including the General Education Board and International Education Board. He was also pivotal in the creation of philanthropic organisations such as the China Medical Board, which was created by Rockefeller Jr. as a result of Fosdick's earlier survey of China's medical problems. Between 1920 and 1935, Fosdick became an integral part of the Rockefeller Foundation as a trustee and its various philanthropies, serving as a leading voice and adviser to Rockefeller Jr.

== President of the Rockefeller Foundation ==
In 1936, Fosdick became the president of the Rockefeller Foundation and served for the next twelve years. He was the fourth president after John D. Rockefeller Jr., George E. Vincent, and Max Mason. His position as president meant he had to step down from other positions elsewhere, most notably the League of Nations Non-Partisan Association. His long history of involvement in philanthropic and internationalist circles had led to numerous trustee positions, all of which he saw as being a conflict of interests to his new position.

Under his leadership, the Rockefeller Foundation flourished. Previously, the foundation had struggled with maintaining internal cohesion and cooperation, with disagreement and rivalry found at every level of the organisation. One of Fosdick's primary goals at the onset was to restore harmony, and, within eighteen months, he had implemented numerous policy changes that brought the various factions back together and rejuvenated the atmosphere at the foundation.

One of the achievements Fosdick was most proud of was the development of a yellow fever vaccine, which had been an ongoing project funded by the Rockefeller Foundation for many years. The foundation also played an important role in the Mexican Agricultural Program, which was a revolutionary plan that started in 1943 to maximise crop production and would go on to kickstart the Green Revolution. Other key achievements were stopping the sudden invasion of malaria into South America and the spread of modern medicine throughout China.

Due to his strong passion for internationalism, Fosdick pushed the foundation beyond the impressive research capabilities it had developed to put greater focus on international knowledge dissemination. This meant that rather than handing out a few large research awards, the foundation would focus on distributing a larger amount of small grants around the world.

His desire for cooperation and internationalism, which he had hoped would draw the world together at a time of heightening tensions, was dashed in 1939 when the Second World War broke out. It didn't take him by surprise though, as in the years leading up to the war he worried about the increasing tide of totalitarian regimes and what he called the impending "intellectual blackout", where the academic and research links that the foundation had fostered internationally would be snuffed out. Fosdick had done his best to avoid this conclusion by continuing to support research and other programs regardless of politics, even in Nazi Germany, until the war began.

World War II would go on to be a defining period of Fosdick's presidency. It was a disaster for the foundation, as the research and values it had sought out for years suddenly began to crumble. In his autobiography, Fosdick wrote:

World War II was a disaster for The Rockefeller Foundation as it was for all agencies everywhere that were dedicated to human welfare. We saw the destruction in wide stretches of Europe and Asia of the libraries, laboratories and public health institutes which Vincent and Rose had so hopefully fostered. An even greater tragedy was the disappearance or death around the world of hundreds of trained peoples – doctors, nurses, scientists and scholars – who represented the promise of the future, and whose creative work the Foundation had supported over long years.

Fosdick's focus immediately went to preservation. One of their first objectives was to rescue academics and researchers who were displaced or endangered. By 1945, the Rockefeller Foundation had saved 303 scholars, including seven Nobel Prize winners – two of whom would go on to be a part of the atomic bomb project. The foundation also helped develop detailed maps of Europe that laid out important cultural monuments and distribute them to Allied bombing headquarters, as a way to protect these historical structures during military operations.

Additional efforts included providing thirty-four million yellow fever vaccine doses to the Allied forces and sending doctors into the city of Naples to deal with a typhus epidemic shortly after being captured by Allied armies. They also funded microfilming projects across England, to preserve historical books and documents from the German bombing raids. After the war, the foundation also funded the rebuilding and restocking of laboratories and libraries throughout Europe. The most controversial role of the foundation was that twenty-three of the leading scientists on the atomic bomb project had their specialized training paid for through fellowships from the Rockefeller Foundation, a fact that would leave Fosdick uneasy for years after the end of the war.

In 1948, at the age of sixty-five, Raymond Fosdick retired from the Rockefeller Foundation. During his time as president of the foundation, 200 million dollars were spent towards developing research and academic studies as well as protecting human welfare.

After his retirement, he spent three years writing The Story of the Rockefeller Foundation, a history of the foundation from its inception. It was published in 1952. He would also go on to write John D. Rockefeller Jr.: A Portrait, a biography published in 1956.

== Family life ==
Fosdick married his first wife, Winifred Finlay, in Montclair, New Jersey on December 2, 1910. Winifred had struggled with her mental health and was seeking treatment for a nervous disorder. On April 4, 1932, she committed suicide after killing their two children: Susan 15 years of age and Raymond Jr. who was nine years old at the time. In Fosdick's personal autobiography, he mentions the personal grief he felt after reading his wife's letters, realising that her mental deterioration was much worse than he initially thought. Fosdick eventually remarried in April 1936 to his second wife Elizabeth Miner, a Smith College graduate who also worked on his staff.

== Death ==
Raymond B. Fosdick died in 1972 at age 89, in Newtown, Connecticut.

== Selected publications ==
- Princeton Verse. Buffalo: Hausauer, Son & Jones Co. (1904).
- European Police Systems (1915)
- American Police Systems (1920)
- Crime in America and the Police (1920)
- Police Administration (1921)
- Our Machine Civilization (1922)
- Toward Liquor Control, with Albert L. Scott (1933)
- The Story of the Rockefeller Foundation (1952)
- John D. Rockefeller Jr., A Portrait (1956)
- Chronicles of a Generation: A Autobiography (1958)
- Adventures in Giving: The Story of the General Education Board (1962)

== Notes ==
Non-profit organization positions
Preceded by Max Mason	President of the Rockefeller Foundation; 1936 – 1948	Succeeded by Chester Barnard
