= Blue Book (FCC) =

FCC report

Public Service Responsibility of Broadcast Licensees was a report published in 1946 by the (U.S.) Federal Communications Commission (FCC), which sought to require radio broadcasters in the United States to abide by a number of public service requirements. The report was informally and commonly referred to as the FCC Blue Book because of the report's blue cover.

The Blue Book bound the privilege of holding a lucrative and scarce radio broadcast license to certain public service requirements. The Blue Book specified the requirements and tied failure to meet these obligations to hearings and to the potential revocation of a broadcast license. Such a standard was never before proposed in the annals of the FCC, and hasn't been proposed since.

The Blue Book—and the commissioners and staff at the FCC who wrote, published, and defended it—faced a considerable backlash from commercial broadcasters. The backlash was tied closely to anti-Communist fervor in the United States in the 1940s and 1950s. Opponents, in particular the National Association of Broadcasters and the radio industry's leading trade magazine, Broadcasting, decried the Blue Book as Communist-inspired, pro-censorship, and anathema to freedom. Broadcasting’s editorials attacked it for 15 consecutive weeks and were later compiled by NBC president Niles Trammel in a red-covered booklet called “The Red Book Looks at the Blue Book.”

The backlash was ultimately successful. Those staff most closely involved with the Blue Book were driven out of the FCC; none of the Blue Book's policy prescriptions were ever implemented, and no U.S. radio broadcaster ever lost its broadcast license as a result of violating the Blue Book's prescriptions.

== Context ==
Disfavor ran rampant against the state of radio in the 1930s and 1940s. Chief among the complaints: the vulgarity of radio commercials and overcommercialization, the erosion of so-called "sustaining (non-commercial) programs", the influence of advertisers to shape news coverage, and the lax performance of broadcasters to abide by their original obligations towards public service. Emblematic of this sentiment was the highly popular novel The Hucksters (1946), which depicted greedy radio station owners. A later film adaptation of The Hucksters (1947) starred Clark Gable.

This sentiment dovetailed with a progressive current at the FCC, whose chair James Lawrence Fly spearheaded a number of initiatives—among them the 1941 Report on Chain Broadcasting that resulted in the breakup of the NBC radio network and the formation of the ABC radio network. The Supreme Court in its 1943 decision NBC, Inc. v. United States affirmed that FCC had the authority to establish programming objectives.

One subsequent initiative was a formalization of the rules of the social contract between radio broadcasters and the public; that crystallized as the Blue Book, which codified the thinking of the majority of FCC commissioners at the time. The Blue Book was unanimously approved by the commission and published on March 7, 1946.

== Content of the Blue Book ==
The Blue Book comprised five parts and was 59 pages long. The five parts are roughly summarized as follows:

1. Local broadcasting is important, and many radio stations violated their commitments for localism.

2. The FCC has the jurisdiction to evaluate public service performance.

3. A number of public service issues are discussed, including public interest considerations regarding license assignment, and what programming suffices to serve the public interest, defining the functions thereof.

4. Statistics show increasing profitability on the part of radio broadcasters, but little improvement of programming. This contradicted the claim that broadcasters couldn't afford public interest programs.

5. Four requirements for broadcast licensees are outlined: promote live, local shows; devote programming to discussing public issues; sustain "unsponsorable" programs; and eliminate "excess advertising".

At the time of the report, there were no Black owners of radio stations and little programming that addressed the Black community. Further, some minority listeners were complaining to the FCC that radio programs frequently contained ethnic stereotypes and caricatures. That is why a segment of the Blue Book asserted that "the American system of broadcasting must serve significant minorities among our population, and the less dominant needs and tastes which most listeners have from time to time."

== WBAL Trial ==
In the fall of 1946, the William Hearst owned Baltimore radio station WBAL was challenged by the Public Service Radio Corporation (PSRC). Formed by well-known radio newsmen, Robert Allen and Drew Pearson, the PSRC claimed WBAL shouldn't have its broadcasting license renewed due to failure in adhering to the Blue Book's regulations in not providing public service programming to the local community and conglomerating a newspaper, radio station, and television station in one city market. The FCC hearings were held between November 1947 and February 1948, to reach a decision, but ultimately stalled allowing WBAL to hold a temporary license. In 1951, the commissioners voted and determined in a three to two vote with two abstains that the WBAL demonstrated competence despite imperfections.

== Failure ==
The FCC never obtained congressional legislation or judicial approval to support the Blue Book's progressive regulations. The Congress was becoming increasingly conservative allowing for increased sympathy for broadcasters and hostility towards radio reformists. Senate Interstate Commerce Committee chairman, Republican senator Wallace White and Republican house representative Charles Wolverton drafted the White-Wolverton Bill to impose clear regulatory guidelines for the FCC and increased constraints on broadcasters. Provisions included granting the FCC authority in determining any station's public service performance, but prevented discriminatory withholding of licenses. The bill also included pro-monopoly legislation prohibiting the FCC from preventing newspapers from owning radio stations. Both broadcasters and reformists were dissatisfied, especially broadcasters as the industry benefited from keeping the FCC's power vague so interventions could be contested automatically. In June 1948, neither of the companion bills received a vote and were discarded.

By the end of 1947, hearings on broadcasters that failed Blue Book standards were dropped and chairman Charles Denny backtracked on the Blue Book's principles.

== Impact ==
Other similar FCC's policies were challenged including the Mayflower Doctrine which prohibited political editorializing, expressing partisan opinion rather than news. On June 2, 1949, the rule was revoked and replaced with the Fairness Doctrine allowing radio stations to choose their own programming, but requiring a reasonable amount of air time to be devoted to public service programming of interest to the community and be designed to hear opposing views on public issues.

In February 1944, the University of Chicago announced the formation of the Hutchins Commission to inquire on the function and responsibilities of the American press. Formed and chaired by University of Chicago president, Robert Hutchins and composed of twelve commissioners that would interview individuals throughout the news industry including advertisers, editors, readers, and reporters. The commission interviewed FCC commissioner and head of the Blue Book study, Clifford Durr and FCC chairman, Lawrence Fly and studied the Blue Book closely to draw its conclusions. In March 1947, the commission released its report and like the Blue Book outlined the need for the press to service programming for the community to clarify societal goals and values.
