= Bruce Hornbrook Sage =

American chemical engineer (1909–1983)

- Born: 1909-11-24
- Died: January 1983 (aged 73)
- Education: BS, New Mexico State College, 1929; MS, Caltech, 1931; PhD, Caltech, 1934
- Known for: rocket propulsion development
- Spouses: Ruth; Helen Johanne Houck (m. 2 April 1965)
- Parents: Archibald Sage (father); June Hornbrook (mother)
- Awards: Medal for Merit
- Scientific career
- Fields: Chemical engineering
- Institutions: California Institute of Technology; Naval Ordnance Test Station; Aerojet
- Thesis: Studies of Thermal and Physical Properties of Hydrocarbons (1934)
- Doctoral advisor: William Noble Lacey

Bruce Hornbrook Sage (24 November 1909 – January 1983) was a chemical engineer who taught chemical engineering at the California Institute of Technology from 1931 to 1974.

== Early career ==
Sage received his bachelor's degree at New Mexico State College in 1929 and his Master of Science degree in 1931 and Doctor of Philosophy degree in 1934 at Caltech, all in chemical engineering. He worked on the design of tactical missiles at Eaton Canyon during World War II before joining the Naval Ordnance Test Station near Inyokern, California, as associate director of engineering and head of the explosives department in 1945. In 1950, he was named senior consultant to the technical director there. He also served as a technical advisor to Aerojet General from 1950 to 1969.

== Honors ==
In 1948, Sage, along with Lee A. DuBridge, William A. Fowler, Max Mason, and Linus Pauling, was awarded the Medal for Merit by President Harry S. Truman.

At the convention of the American Chemical Society held in Atlantic City, New Jersey, Sage was given the Precision Scientific Co. award of US$1,000 (equivalent to US$13,215 in 2024) on 19 September 1949, to "recognize, encourage, and stimulate research achievement in the field of petroleum chemistry in United States and Canada." He received US$1,000 awards again in 1963 (equivalent to US$10,271 in 2024) and in 1968 (equivalent to US$9,042 in 2024), this time for "distinguished service to his country in the design and development of solid-propellant rockets and for his research contributions to basic chemistry."

The Society of Petroleum Engineers named Sage as the winner of the annual AIME Anthony F. Lucas Gold Medal on 17 February 1954 in New York City; the citation read:

- For his distinguished achievements in research on the phase behavior and thermodynamics of petroleum hydrocarbons;
- for the development of ingenious techniques and equipment for the study of these materials under petroleum reservoir conditions;
- for the resourceful application of mathematics in extending the range of prediction of the behavior of hydrocarbons over a wide range of pressure and temperature;
- and for his marked contribution to the present-day concepts of good petroleum engineering practice.

On 29 November 1956 in New York City, the American Rocket Society presented Sage with their Clarence N. Hickman Award for his work with propellants in jet propulsion. At the invitation of the Academy of Sciences of the Soviet Union, Sage visited Russia for two weeks in the summer of 1958 to discuss differences in the field of steam research. In 1959, he received the William H. Walker Award for Excellence in Contributions to Chemical Engineering Literature from the American Institute of Chemical Engineers. In 1968, the Union Oil Company of California donated US$250,000 (equivalent to US$2,260,526 in 2024) to Caltech for two chemical engineering fellowships: one to be named for Bruce Sage, the other for his long-time collaborator, William N. Lacey.

== Works ==
- Sage, Bruce H. (July 1933). "Measurement of Viscosities of Liquids Saturated with Gases at High Pressures". Industrial & Engineering Chemistry Analytical Edition. 5 (4): 261–263. doi:10.1021/ac50084a020. S2CID 94874533.
- Sage, Bruce H.; Lacey, William N. (January 1934). "Phase Equilibria in Hydrocarbon Systems. I. Methods and Apparatus". Industrial and Engineering Chemistry. 26 (1). American Chemical Society: 103–106. doi:10.1021/ie50289a026. S2CID 98339293.
- Sage, Bruce H.; Lacey, William N.; Schaafsma, Jan G. (February 1934). "Phase Equilibria in Hydrocarbon Systems. II. Methane-Propane System". Industrial and Engineering Chemistry. 26 (2). American Chemical Society: 214–217. doi:10.1021/ie50290a020. S2CID 93851351.
- Sage, Bruce Hornbrook (1934). Studies of Thermal and Physical Properties of Hydrocarbons (PhD thesis). California Institute of Technology. doi:10.7907/3SFC-Y308. Archived from the original on 2020-03-04.
- Sage, B. H.; Standart, G. C.; Billman, G. W.; Corcoran, W. H.; Hough, E. W. (January 1946). "Transfer of Energy and Materials in Fluid System".
- Connolly, T. J.; Frankel, S. P.; Sage, B. H. (January 1951). "Methods to the prediction of phase behavior: Predicting phase behavior with digital computers". Electrical Engineering. 70 (1). IEEE: 47. doi:10.1109/EE.1951.6437205. ISSN 0095-9197. S2CID 51630842.
- Lacey, W. N.; Sage, B. H. (October 1951). "Heterogeneous Equilibria and Phase Diagrams". Annual Review of Physical Chemistry. 2: 21–36. Bibcode:1951ARPC....2...21L. doi:10.1146/annurev.pc.02.100151.000321.
- Gavalas, G. R.; Reamer, H. H.; Sage, B. H. (1968-05-01). "Diffusion Coefficients in Hydrocarbon Systems. Homogeneous Phases at Elevated Pressures". Industrial & Engineering Chemistry Fundamentals. 7 (2). American Chemical Society: 306–312. doi:10.1021/i160026a020.
