= Erwin Reifler =

Austrian comparative philologist

Erwin Reifler (Chinese: 罗逸民; 16 June 1903 - 23 April 1965) was an Austrian comparative philologist. He proposed comparative semantics, influenced by Joseph Vendryes.

== Biography ==
Erwin Reifler was born on June 16, 1903, in Vienna, Austria, to a Jewish family. He studied political science, Chinese (with Arthur von Rosthorn), and European classical languages at the University of Vienna. There he was a librarian in the Chinese Library in the Imperial Palace in Vienna from 1924 to 1927. He was awarded a PhD in political science in 1931. His thesis was entitled State and Administration in Ancient China. At Vienna he also developed a friendship with the American actress Anna May Wong who encouraged him to go to China.

He went to China in 1932 as an assistant and interpreter for the Austrian consulate to Shanghai and got the position to teach German at Shanghai Jiaotong University. He had the professorship in German language for five years and mainly taught German to Chinese but also Chinese to international foreigners in Shanghai. His wife Henrietta Brown was a student of his at that time.

During his early pedagogical career, he developed a set of mnemonic schemes for learning Chinese characters. This study led him to further develop an interest in comparative semantics and semasiology.

He taught shortly from 1937 and 1940 in Hongkong before he went back to Shanghai and taught philology (German and Latin) in the National Medical College and in the School of Pharmacy of the Sino-French University. He settled later into the position of Professor of Sinology at l'Université l'Aurore (震旦大学).

In 1947, he met Karl August Wittfogel in US and the latter recommended Reifler to George Taylor who was then starting the Far Eastern Department at the University of Washington. Reifler join the faculty in the fall of 1947 and taught there until his death in 1965.

== Involvement in Machine Translation ==
In 1948, Erwin Reifler presented a paper entitled "the Chinese Language in the Light of Comparative Semantics" at the American Philosophical Society annual conference. The abstract of the paper was published by Science in the same year. Warren Weaver, the Director of Natural Sciences at the Rockefeller Foundation, at that time saw the paper, and cited an example Reifler gave in order to illustrate the potential connections across languages in Weaver own memorandum on the possibility Machine Translation in 1949.

== Selected works ==
- A New Approach to the Chinese Language. Arts Association of Hong Kong University 1938.
- La Langue Chinoise à la Lumière de la Philologie Moderne. Bulletin de l'Université de l'Aurore (1943) 419-434.
- Étude sur l'Étymologie des Caractères Chinois. Bulletin de l'Université de l'Aurore (1944) 1-36.
- Contribution de la Philologie Chinoise à la Philologie Mondiale. Bulletin de l'Université de l'Aurore (1946) 31-50.
- Nature Complémentaire des Philologies Chinoise et Étrangères. Bulletin de l'Université de l'Aurore (1948) 98-106.
- La 'Fission de l'Atome' en Sinologie à l'Aide de la Sémantique Comparative. Analyse des Associations Préhistoriques d'Idées qui en Résultent (Découverte d'un Aspect Nouveau en Sinologie). Bulletin de l'Université de l'Aurore (1949) 239-254.
- Linguistic Analysis, Meaning, and Comparative Semantics. Lingua 3 (1952/53) 371-390.
- "The Mechanical Determination of Meaning". In Sergei, Nirenburg; Harold, Somers; Yorick, Wilks. Readings in Machine Translation. 1955
- The Archaeological and Metrological evidence for an Indus Valley and Sumero-Babylonian Origin of the Ancient Chinese Measuring System, in Danekar (ed), Proceedings of the Twenty-Sixth Congress of Orientalists v4 (1970) 139-162.
- H. J. Griffin (ed): Ancient Hebrew and Solomonic Building Construction: Compiled From the Notes of Dr Erwin Reifler [microfilm]. 1984.
- Erwin Reifler. A Comparative History of Metrology [microfilm]. 1984. with H. J. Griffin.
