= Robert Maynard Hutchins =

American philosopher (1899–1977)

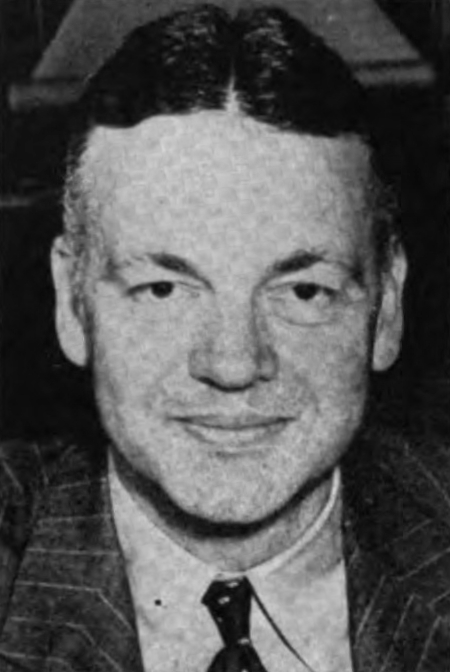
- Hutchins c. 1954

5th President of the University of Chicago
- In office 1929–1945
- Preceded by: Max Mason
- Succeeded by: Lawrence A. Kimpton

4th Dean of Yale Law School
- In office 1927–1929
- Preceded by: Thomas Walter Swan
- Succeeded by: Charles Edward Clark

Personal details
- Born: January 17, 1899 Brooklyn, New York, U.S.
- Died: May 14, 1977 (aged 78) Santa Barbara, California, U.S.
- Spouse(s): Maude Hutchins; Vesta Orlick Hutchins
- Education: Yale University (BA, LLB)
- Occupation: Educator

Robert Maynard Hutchins (January 17, 1899 – May 14, 1977) was an American educational philosopher. He was the 5th president (1929–1945) and chancellor (1945–1951) of the University of Chicago, and earlier dean of Yale Law School (1927–1929). His first wife was the novelist Maude Hutchins. Although his father and grandfather were both Presbyterian ministers, Hutchins became one of the most influential members of the school of secular perennialism.

A graduate of Yale College and Yale Law School, Hutchins joined the Yale Law faculty and soon was named dean. While dean, he gained notice for Yale's development of the philosophy of legal realism. Hutchins was thirty years old when he became Chicago's president in 1929, and implemented wide-ranging and sometimes controversial reforms of the university, including the elimination of varsity football. He supported interdisciplinary programs, including during World War II, establishing the Metallurgical Laboratory. His most far-reaching academic reforms involved the undergraduate College of the University of Chicago, which was retooled into a novel pedagogical system built on Great Books, Socratic dialogue, comprehensive examinations and early entrance to college. Although parts of the Hutchins Plan were abandoned by the university shortly after Hutchins left in 1951, an adapted version of the program survived at Shimer College.

Hutchins left Chicago for the Ford Foundation, where he channeled resources into studying education. In 1954 he became president of a Ford Foundation spinoff devoted to civil liberties, the Fund for the Republic. In 1959, he founded the Center for the Study of Democratic Institutions, a think tank in Santa Barbara, California.

== Early life and career ==
Robert Maynard Hutchins was born in Brooklyn in 1899, the second of three sons of William James Hutchins, a Presbyterian minister and future Berea College president. Eight years later, the family moved to Oberlin, Ohio, site of Oberlin College, where William Hutchins became an instructor. Oberlin was a small community dedicated to evangelical ideals of righteousness and hard work, which had a lifelong influence on Hutchins. Hutchins studied at Oberlin Academy and subsequently Oberlin College from 1915 to 1917.

At age 18 in 1917, shortly after the United States entered World War I, Hutchins joined the ambulance service of the United States Army, together with his brother William. The Hutchins brothers served in an all-Oberlin unit, Section 587, which for much of the war was stationed at the Allentown Fair Grounds, where they were tasked with creating a barracks. Upon subsequent deployment to Italy, Hutchins was awarded the Croce al Merito di Guerra.

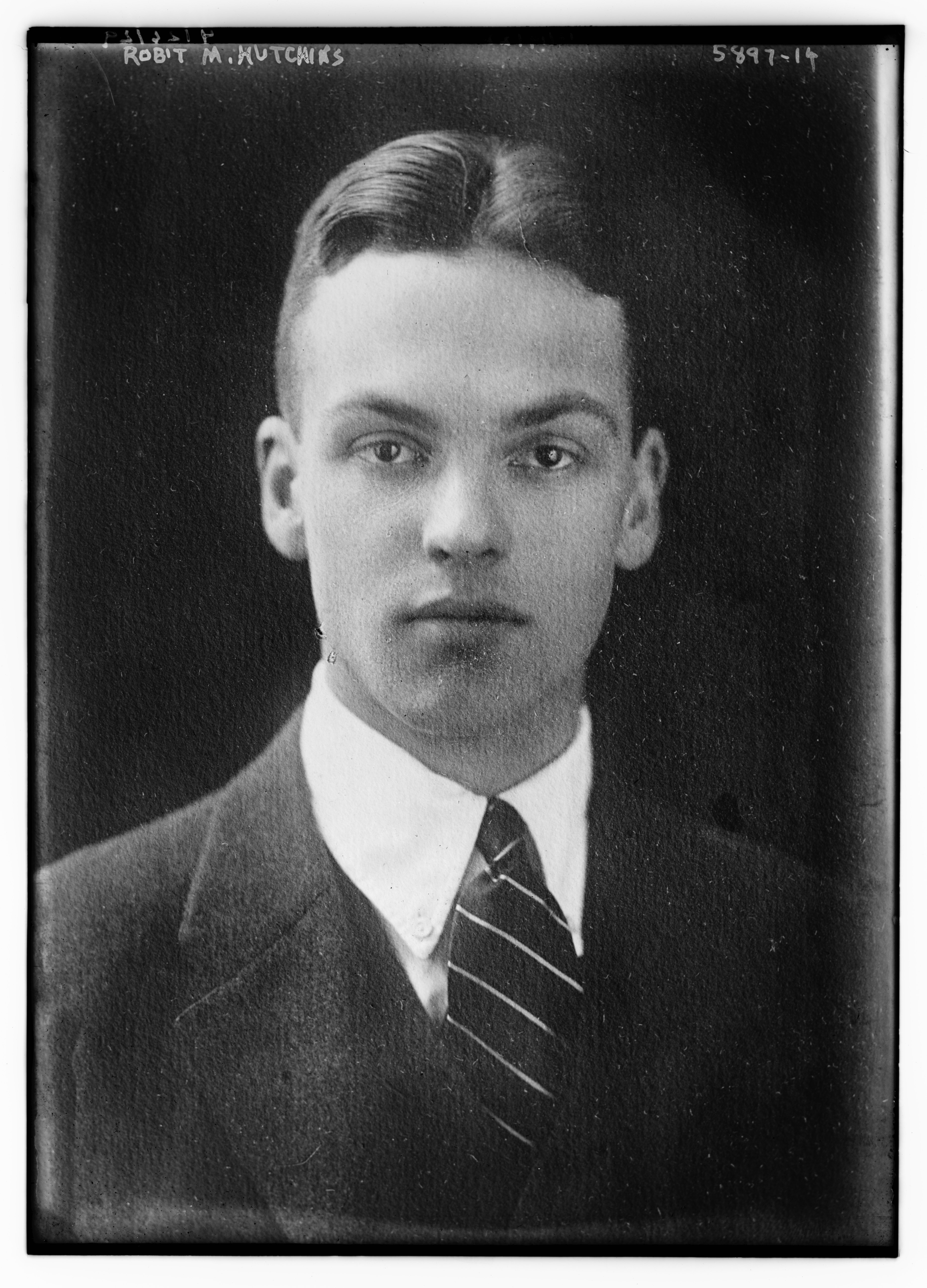
Hutchins' Yale yearbook photo, 1921

Returning from the war in 1919, Hutchins went to Yale University (B.A. 1921). At Yale he encountered a very different society from what he had known before at Oberlin; the tone was set by preparatory school graduates who defied Prohibition. However, Hutchins did not enjoy the same level of financial support, and in his junior and senior years, he worked menial jobs for up to six hours per day to cover living expenses. In his senior year, he was tapped for the Wolf's Head Society. Having already fulfilled his graduation requirements, he also enrolled in Yale Law School. Fascinated by the case method, Hutchins subsequently regarded this as the beginning of his true education. Shortly after his graduation in 1921, Hutchins married Maude Phelps McVeigh. They had three daughters together, the first born in 1925. They divorced in 1948, and in 1949 he married Vesta Orlick, who had formerly been his secretary.

After spending a year teaching high school History and English in Lake Placid, New York, he was hired to become the Secretary of the Yale Corporation. In this position he was the principal assistant to the president of Yale, with responsibility for alumni relations and fundraising. Returning to New Haven, he also resumed his studies at Yale Law School (LL.B 1925). Upon completing his LL.B., graduating at the top of his class, he was invited to join the Yale Law faculty, teaching courses on evidence and utility law. He became acting dean of Yale Law School in 1927, and full dean in 1928. It was at this point, when he was the dean of Yale Law while still in his 20s, that Hutchins became a national figure.

At the time, Yale Law School was dominated by the Legal Realists and Hutchins sought to promote Legal Realism during his time as dean. Skeptical of the received rules of evidence that he had taught as a professor, he worked to integrate the findings of psychology, sociology and logic with the law. His supporters in this enterprise included William O. Douglas, who left Columbia School of Law to work under Hutchins at Yale. Hutchins played a key role in convincing the Rockefeller Foundation to fund an Institute of Human Relations at Yale, to foster partnerships between the social sciences and law and medicine.

== University of Chicago tenure ==
Hutchins (left) is joined by namesake donor George Herbert Jones (right) and Jones' daughter during the dedication of the George Herbert Jones Laboratory in December 1929.

He became the youngest university president in the country at age 30 upon his appointment to that position at the University of Chicago on 25 April 1929, assuming his new duties nine weeks later on 1 July. Over the next several years, Hutchins came to question Legal Realism, which he had previously championed, and grew skeptical of the ability of empirical research in the social sciences to solve social problems, especially in the face of the Great Depression. Particularly through contact with Mortimer Adler, he became convinced that the solution to the philosophical problems facing the university lay in Aristotelianism and Thomism. In the late 1930s, Hutchins attempted to reform the curriculum of the University of Chicago along Aristotelian-Thomist lines, only to have the faculty reject his proposed reforms three times.

Hutchins served as president of the University of Chicago until 1945, and as its chancellor until 1951. During his chancellorship, he recruited a commission to inquire into the proper function of the media. By 1947, the Hutchins Commission issued their report on the "social responsibility" of the press.

Hutchins was notable as a defender of academic freedom. When the university was accused of fostering communism in 1935 (by Charles Rudolph Walgreen, who claimed his niece had been indoctrinated with communist ideas whilst studying there) and again in 1949, Hutchins defended the right of the university's faculty to teach as they wished, arguing that the best way to defeat communism was through open debate and scrutiny, rather than suppression. "Hutchins stood behind his faculty and their right to teach and believe as they wished, insisting that communism could not withstand the scrutiny of public analysis and debate."

Hutchins was able to implement his ideas regarding a two-year, generalist bachelors during his tenure at Chicago, and subsequently had designated those studying in depth in a field as masters students. He pulled Chicago out of the Big Ten Conference and eliminated the school's increasingly struggling football program, which he saw as a campus distraction. Hutchins heaped scorn upon schools which received more press coverage for their sports teams than for their educational programs, and the trustees provided the support he needed to drop football on 21 December 1939.

The decision was met with mixed reactions, with many students and alumni opposing the abolition of what had been seen as a major element of the university's culture. Within a year, however, an overwhelming majority of students, alumni, and professors had aligned behind Hutchins' vision for a university that emphasized education above athletics. Hutchins today serves as a model for those who argue that commercialized college sports are incompatible with the academic and intellectual aims of institutions of higher learning.

He also worked to eliminate fraternities and religious organizations for the same reason. While he exhibited great fervor for his curricular project and numerous notable alumni were produced during the period, nevertheless, the business community as well as donors became highly skeptical of the value of the program, and eventually were able to have the four-year, traditional A.B. and S.B. reinstated (and in time, football). The College's financial clout, which had been considerable prior to his tenure, underwent a serious downgrading with decreased collegiate enrollment and a drying up of donations from the school's principal Chicago area benefactors. As such, his critics view him as a dangerous idealist who pushed the school out of the national limelight and temporarily thwarted its possible expansion, while his supporters argue that it was his changes that kept Chicago intellectually unique and from taking on the vocational inclinations that he denigrated in his writings.

== Later life and legacy ==
After leaving his position at the university, Hutchins became an officer of the Ford Foundation. Due to the rapid growth of the US automotive industry in the early 1950s, the Ford Foundation was running such large surpluses that it attracted unwanted attention from the Internal Revenue Service. Hutchins was thus able to steer substantial funds into his areas of interest, establishing the Fund for the Advancement of Education and Fund for Adult Education. The Fund for the Advancement of Education sponsored projects including nationwide teacher training and college early entrance programs at 12 colleges. The programs at three of these colleges, Goucher College, the University of Utah, and Shimer College, continue in operation today. The Fund for Adult Education sponsored experimental educational programs for adults, chiefly in the liberal arts; these included the National Educational Television network which later became PBS. In 1954 Hutchins became president of the Fund for the Republic, which promoted civil liberties with $15 million from the Ford Foundation. he died of a heart attack on May 14, 1977 at age of 78.

After leaving the Fund for the Republic, Hutchins founded the Center for the Study of Democratic Institutions in 1959, which was his attempt to bring together a community of scholars to analyze this broad area. Hutchins described the Center's goal as examining democratic institutions "by taking a multidisciplinary look at the state of the democratic world – and the undemocratic world as well, because one has to contrast the two and see how they are going to develop." He further stated, "After discovering what is going on, or trying to discover what is going on, the Center offers its observations for such public consideration as the public is willing to give them".

While modified and reduced in form, the collegiate curriculum at the University of Chicago to this day reflects the Great Books and Socratic method championed by Hutchins' Secular Perennialism. In addition, a direct descendant of the program continues in operation at Shimer College in Chicago, which was affiliated with the university until the mid-1950s. A classroom and scholarship for early entrants at Shimer still bear his name. A somewhat more distantly related program is operated at St. John's College.

Carl Sagan in The Demon-Haunted World says that he was "lucky enough" to have studied under Hutchins, "where science was presented as an integral part of the gorgeous tapestry of human knowledge."

The Hutchins School of Liberal Studies at Sonoma is named in his honor.

Along with Albert Einstein, Hutchins was one of the sponsors of the Peoples' World Convention (PWC), also known as Peoples' World Constituent Assembly (PWCA), which took place in 1950-51 at Palais Electoral, Geneva, Switzerland.

== Educational theory ==
Throughout his career, Hutchins was a fierce proponent of using those select books that have gained a reputation of being great books as an educational tool. In his interview in 1970 titled, "Don't Just Do Something", Hutchins explained, "...the Great Books [are] the most promising avenue to liberal education if only because they are teacher-proof." Illustrating his dedication to the Great Books, Hutchins served as editor in chief of Great Books of the Western World and Gateway to the Great Books. He served as coeditor of The Great Ideas Today, and as chairman of the board of editors of Encyclopædia Britannica from 1943 to 1974. He also published extensively under his own name.

According to Hutchins in The University of Utopia, "The object of the educational system, taken as a whole, is not to produce hands for industry or to teach the young how to make a living. It is to produce responsible citizens". In The University of Utopia, Hutchins describes a country that has evolved to become the perfect society, Utopia, as well as their educational system, which has the well-defined purpose of "promot[ing] the intellectual development of the people". Hutchins also explores some of the improper directions educational institutions have taken in the United States. He argues that education is becoming nothing more than a trade school, and a poor trade school at that. Hutchins discusses the relationship between a foundry and the local college in a particular town in California. This college offers courses on doing foundry work, which instruct students to become workers at the foundry. In this way, the college is satisfying the need of the community for foundry workers rather than the intellectual needs of the individual. Further, Hutchins asserts that the foundry students actually receive poor training since educators do not have the practical experience of working in the foundry. Hutchins believes the students would receive a much more efficient and thorough education on working in a foundry by actually working in that foundry. He claims Universities should instead teach intellectual content, specifically the intellectual content related to the occupation, but that the occupation itself should take responsibility for training its employees. Hutchins also warns that education has shifted its focus from being educational to custodial. He charges that many schools have become no more than baby-sitting services for adolescents, protecting them from the tumultuous world of youth. He cites courses in home economics and driver's education as focusing on meeting a societal need rather than an educational goal. Hutchins also berates education for the path it has taken regarding specialization. According to Hutchins in his essay, "The Idea of a College," the specialization of American education has robbed students of the ability to communicate with other students outside of their field. He argues that a student of biology cannot converse meaningfully with a student of mathematics because they share no common educational experience.

In The University of Utopia, Hutchins outlines the educational experience of young Utopians, where the first ten years of instruction prepare students for the learning experiences to come. Communication is the primary skill developed. Students learn to read, write, and discuss issues in preparation for their future lifetime of learning. Students study science and mathematics, which form part of the groundwork for future learning. History, geography, and literature are also studied to add to the framework for even deeper learning later in life. Finally, art and music are studied because these are considered the elements that make society great.

Throughout these fields of study in Utopia, the Great Books, those books that shaped Western thought, are used as study material and are discussed by classes using the Socratic method. The Socratic method, named for Socrates and his method of teaching, involves the teacher keeping the discussion on topic and guiding it away from errors of logic. In a discussion conducted in accordance with Socratic principles, unexamined opinions are fair game, and only reason itself is the final arbiter. Thus, any conclusions reached in such a discussion are the individual's own, not necessarily those of a class consensus, and certainly not necessarily the teacher's. The Great Books are a natural choice, since they are considered to be works of genius, timeless, and ever relevant to society. Why settle for lesser materials when you can have the best? Despite his other foci, Hutchins does not entirely shun the laboratory world; he believes, however, that some such things are best learned through discovery once a student has been graduated to the outside world.

In Utopia, initial schooling is followed by college, which continues the study of a highly prescribed curriculum. Here, however, the focus shifts from learning the techniques of communication to exploring some of man's principal concepts of the world and the leading ideas that have propelled mankind. After college, students sit for an extensive exam created by an outside board, which reflects what an education appropriate to a free person should be. This rigorous exam is similar to those taken throughout a student's education but is more comprehensive. When the student passes this exam, he or she is awarded a Bachelor of Arts Degree. The degree is conferred based on the mastery of this information, not on the number of classes taken, credits earned, or hours spent in class.

After proving that they have the necessary education to become a part of the republic of learning and of the political republic, the student may enter the work world or continue his or her formal education at the university. Once departing from formal education, a lifetime of learning follows for the citizens of Utopia. They visit centers of learning to explore and discuss ideas and analyze great works. These centers of learning are residential institutions where citizens go during what Americans would traditionally think of as vacation time. If they choose to matriculate to University, students begin to specialize, but they do not study collection of data, technical training, or solutions to immediate practical problems, but rather they explore the intellectual ideas specific to their chosen field. Here, students study in much less formal situations but with no less vigor. During their initial schooling and college, students had to prove that they could learn independently; if they then chose to attend a University, they were expected to make effective use of those skills.

In addition to Hutchins' belief that school should pursue intellectual ideas rather than practical, he also believed that schools should not teach a specific set of values. "It is not the object of a college to make its students good, because the college cannot do it; if it tries to do it, it will fail; it will weaken the agencies that should be discharging this responsibility, and it will not discharge its own responsibility." The schools should not be in the business of teaching students what is right and just; it should be in the business of helping students make their own determinations.

When young people are asked, "What are you interested in?" they answer that they are interested in justice: they want justice for the Negro, they want justice for the Third World. If you say, "Well, what is justice?" they haven't any idea.

— Berwick, 1970

Critics will point out that the great books do not have one answer to what justice is or is not. In fact, there are many contradictory answers to this question. But what some see as a weakness, Hutchins sees as a strength. Hutchins asserts that students should be exposed to these conflicting ideas so that they may weigh and balance them in their own minds, boiling down the arguments and synthesizing a view of their own. In this way, and only in this way, can students learn what justice, beauty, and good really are.

== Works ==
- 1936, No Friendly Voice
- 1936, The Higher Learning in America
- 1943, Education for Freedom
- 1945, The Atomic Bomb versus Civilization
- 1947, The Education We Need
- 1947, The Works of the Mind: The Administrator
- 1949, St. Thomas and the World State
- 1949, The State of the University, 1929–1949
- 1950 Morals, Religion, and Higher Education
- 1950, The Idea of a College
- 1952, The Great Conversation: The Substance of a Liberal Education (includes The Tradition of the West)
- 1953, The University of Utopia
- 1953, The Conflict in Education in a Democratic Society
- 1954, Great Books: The Foundation of a Liberal Education
- 1956, Some Observations on American Education
- 1956, Freedom, education and the Fund; essays and addresses, 1946–1956
- 1963, Gateway to the Great Books
- 1968, The Learning Society
- 1968, Zuckerkandl!
- 1969, No Friendly Voice (reprint)
- 1972, Prospects for a Learning Society

== See also ==
- Educational perennialism
- Great Books
- Great Books of the Western World
- Liberal education
- College of the University of Chicago
- Shimer Great Books School, and
- St. John's College whose Great Books Curricula are derived from the Hutchins Plan

== Sources ==
- Ashmore, Harry Scott. Unseasonable Truths: The Life of Robert Maynard Hutchins. Boston: Little, Brown & Co., 1989.
- Bates, Stephen. An Aristocracy of Critics: Luce, Hutchins, Niebuhr, and the Committee That Redefined Freedom of the Press. New Haven: Yale University Press, 2020. ISBN 978-0-300-11189-7.
- Berwick, Keith. (1970). Interview with Robert M. Hutchins (transcript). Don't Just Do Something.
- Dzuback, Mary Ann. Robert M. Hutchins: Portrait of an Educator. Chicago: University of Chicago, 1991. ISBN 0-226-17710-6.
- "Hutchins, Robert M.". Encyclopædia Britannica. 2001.
- Hutchins, Robert M. (1950). The Idea of a College. Retrieved 2012-08-15, http://www.ditext.com/hutchins/1950.html
- Hutchins, Robert M. (1953) The University of Utopia. Chicago: The University of Chicago Press. ISBN 0-226-56171-2.
- Kelly, Frank K. Court of Reason – Robert Hutchins and the Fund for the Republic. New York: The Free Press, 1981
- MacAloon, John J., ed. General Education in the Social Sciences: Centennial Reflections on the College of the University of Chicago (1992)
- Mayer, Milton (1993). Robert Maynard Hutchins: A Memoir. University of California Press. ISBN 0-520-07091-7.
- McArthur, Benjamin. “A Gamble on Youth: Robert M. Hutchins, the University of Chicago, and the Politics of Presidential Selection.” History of Education Quarterly 30 (1990): 161– 86.
- McNeill, William H. (1991). Hutchins' University: A Memoir of the University of Chicago, 1929–1950. Chicago: The University of Chicago Press.
- Martín, Àngel Pascual. "Liberal education, residential practices and collegial life in the age of Great Universities in the US. Chicago and President Hutchins’ policy." Espacio, Tiempo y Educación 10.1 (2023): 77-94. online
- Purcell, Edward A., Jr. (1973), The Crisis of Democratic Theory: Scientific Naturalism and the Problem of Value
- Reeves, Thomas C., Freedom and the Foundation: The Fund for the Republic in the Era of McCarthyism (New York: Knopf, 1969).
- Shils, Edward. "Robert Maynard Hutchins," American Scholar, 1990, Vol. 59, Issue 2, pp. 211–216.
- Sullivan, Neil J. (2016). The Prometheus Bomb: The Manhattan Project and Government in the Dark. Lincoln: University of Nebraska Press. ISBN 978-1-61234-890-2.
- An Interview with Dr. Robert M. Hutchins at Smithsonian Folkways
- Dr Hutchins interview with Mike Wallace on The Mike Wallace Interview July 20, 1958
- University of Chicago biography

Academic offices
Preceded by Thomas Walter Swan	Dean of Yale Law School; 1927–1929	Succeeded by Charles Edward Clark
Preceded by Max Mason	President of the University of Chicago; 1929–1951	Succeeded by Lawrence A. Kimpton
