= Max Mason =

American mathematician (1877–1961)

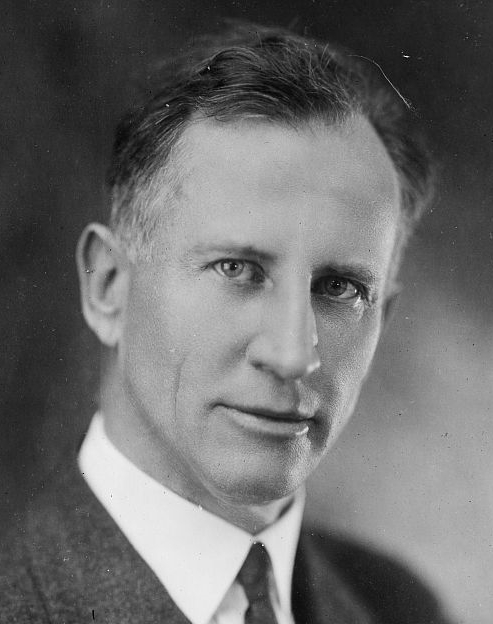
- Max Mason
- Born: October 26, 1877; Madison, Wisconsin
- Died: March 22, 1961 (aged 83); Claremont, California
- Known for: differential equations; calculus of variations; electromagnetism; Mason–Weaver equation
- Awards: Medal for Merit 1948
- Scientific career
- Fields: mathematics
- Workplaces: University of Chicago; Rockefeller Foundation

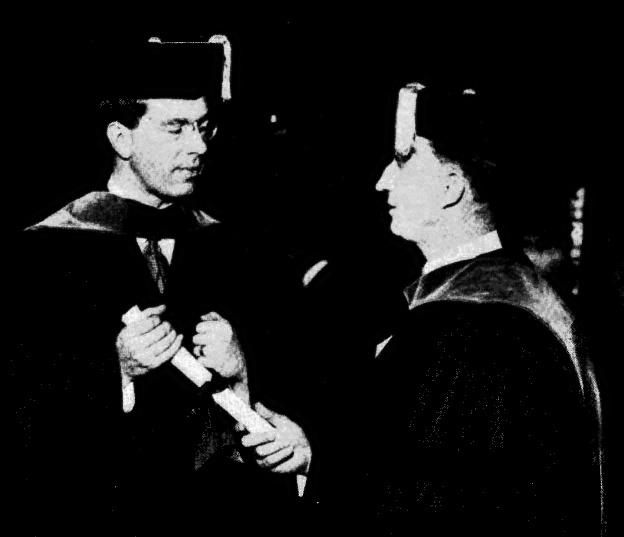
Crown Prince Gustaf Adolf of Sweden receives his doctor's diploma as an honorary doctorate from the University of Chicago from the university's president, Professor Max Mason, 1926

Charles Max Mason (26 October 1877–22 March 1961), better known as Max Mason, was an American mathematician. He served the 4th president of the University of Chicago from 1925 to 1928 and as the third president of the Rockefeller Foundation from 1929 to 1936.

Mason's mathematical research interests included differential equations, the calculus of variations, and electromagnetic theory.

== Education ==
- B.Litt., 1898, University of Wisconsin-Madison
- Ph.D., Mathematics, University of Göttingen, 1903.
  - Dissertation: "Randwertaufgaben bei gewöhnlichen Differentialgleichungen" (Boundary value functions with ordinary differential equations)
  - Advisor: Hilbert

== Career ==
- Massachusetts Institute of Technology (MIT), 1903–1904, Instructor of Mathematics.
- Yale University, 1904–1908, Assistant Professor of Mathematics.
- University of Wisconsin–Madison, 1908–1909, University of Wisconsin–Madison, Associate Professor of Mathematics.
- University of Wisconsin–Madison, 1909–1925, Professor of Physics.
  - National Research Council, 1917–1919, Submarine Committee. (Invented a submarine detection device, which was the basis for sonar detectors used in World War II.)
- University of Chicago, 1925–1928, President.
- Rockefeller Foundation, 1928–1929, Director, Natural Sciences Division.
- Rockefeller Foundation, 1929–1936, President.
- Palomar Observatory (California), 1936–1949, Chairman of the team directing the construction of the observatory.

On 2 May 1945, he appeared on Edgar Bergen's radio show to chat about the new observatory and trade jokes with Charlie McCarthy. In 1948, he, along with Lee A. DuBridge, William A. Fowler, Linus Pauling, and Bruce H. Sage, was awarded the Medal for Merit by President Harry S. Truman.

== Notes and references ==
Academic offices
Preceded by Ernest DeWitt Burton	President of the University of Chicago; 1925–1928	Succeeded by Robert Maynard Hutchins
Non-profit organization positions
Preceded by George E. Vincent	President of the Rockefeller Foundation; 20 September 1929–30 May 1936	Succeeded by Raymond B. Fosdick
