= Dallas Walker Smythe =

Canadian-born political activist

Dallas Walker Smythe (March 9, 1907 – September 6, 1992) was a political activist and researcher who contributed to a political economy of communications. He believed that research should be used to develop knowledge that could be applied to policies in support of public interest and the disenfranchised in the face of private capital. He focused his research on mass media and telecommunications. Some of his main ideas included the "invisible triangle" (broadcasters, advertisers and audience members), and the "audience commodity". Much of his effort was focused on differentiating between Administrative and Critical Communications research.

== Background and education ==
Dallas Walker Smythe was born in 1907 in Regina, Saskatchewan, Canada. His father ran a hardware store in Regina, and his mother was a nurse from Caledonia. His parents married in 1906. His father was a Presbyterian, and his mother followed the Church of England. Religion was important in his early childhood. The family didn't follow any particular church, but often read the passages in the New Testament that discussed the ethical principles of Christianity, which held ideas of primitive socialism. As a child, he almost died of the flu, and subsequently his family moved to Pasadena, California, in search of a healthier climate. Encouraged by his junior college economics teacher, Smythe wrote an essay for a national contest and won $100. This encouraged him to pursue economics and become a teacher. Smythe was shy in junior college and didn't date much. He eventually married Beatrice Bell, the first woman he fell in love with. After studying at the University of California, Los Angeles, in his third year of junior college, he finished his degree at the University of California, Berkeley, achieving his A.B. in Economics in 1928. Later that year, he entered the Ph.D. Economics program at Berkeley, where he undertook a seven-year thesis on the East San Francisco transit system.

== Government career and impetus for applied social science research ==
After finishing his Ph.D., Dallas W. Smythe worked for 14 years in various government departments as an economist: the Department of Agriculture (1934–1947), Central Statistics Board (1937–1938), the Department of Labor (1938–1941), the Federal Communications Commission (1943–1948). During his time at the F.C.C, Smythe helped create the Blue Book, which administered telecommunications policy until the 1960s.

During his time working with the government, his ideas about social justice, social science research and the media were shaped by a number of events. The shooting of picketers by the National Guard at the San Francisco Longshore Strike, and the plight of drought-driven farmers of Midwest during the Depression demonstrated to Smythe the vagaries of class struggle. However, it was his concern for the Spanish Civil War and the citizens' struggle against fascism that led him to being involved with the American League for Peace and Democracy, which promoted education and political action to help lift the arms embargo.

Later, when he applied for position as Economics Professor at University of Illinois, Urbana, his appointment was attacked with fallacies about his former activities. J. Edgar Hoover refused to give his FBI files to the university administration. However, the attorney general intervened and Smythe was duly appointed to the University of Illinois, where he taught Communications and Economics until 1963.

During the period of McCarthyism, Smythe found it difficult to get articles published or to get money to fund research. He left the US after the Cuban Missile Crisis, because he feared for his family's welfare in the US. The Smythe family moved to Canada in 1963, and Dallas found a job teaching Communication and Economics at the University of Saskatchewan for the next 10 years. Later, he became professor in the Communication Department at Simon Fraser University, Burnaby, BC, from 1974 until his death in 1992 at age of 85. Smythe died in Langley, British Columbia.

== School of thought ==
Smythe applied social science methodologies against the flows of the capitalist system. He believed that a researcher must be engaged with the social processes studied. Overall, Smythe wanted to expose political and economic power relations that were reproduced in institutional relations, embedded in technology and represented in communications.

His theoretical approach was social realism, which acknowledged that institutions and policies mediate cultural realism. He also used Critical Marxist theory, which he posited did not have to be explicitly Marxist, but must be critical of phenomena in their systemic context.

== Key concepts ==
A contemporary mention of Smythes concept of "audience commodity" is to find in a 2012 event and discussion between Jacob Appelbaum and Dmytri Kleiner about "Resisting the Surveillance State and its network effects" at the 2012 re-publica in Berlin. Kleiner introduces Smythes ideas in order to re-contextualize the controversies about Social Media and privacy. To regain an understanding of the ways media is funded by ways of commoditizing their audience means to build a better understanding how the economic fundamentals of the media business conflicts with privacy concerns. "Audience commodity" is here a key concept, translated into the contemporary debate about Social Media, post-privacy and surveillance.

== Major works ==
- Smythe, D.W. (1937). An Economic History of Local and Interurban Transportation in the East Bay Cities with Particular Reference to the Properties Developed by F. M. Smith. Berkeley: University of California.
- Smythe, D.W. (1977). "Communications: Blindspot of Western Marxism". Canadian Journal of Political and Social Theory. 1 (3): 1–28.
- Smythe, D.W. (1981). Dependency Road: Communications, Capitalism, Consciousness and Canada. Norwood, NJ: Ablex Publishing.
- Smythe, D.W. (1981). "Communications: Blindspot of Economics". In Melody, W.H.; Salter, L.; Heyer, P. (eds.). Culture, Communication and Dependency: The Tradition of H.A. Innis. Norwood, NJ: Ablex.
- Smythe, D.W. & T. Van Dinh (1983). "On Critical and Administrative Research: A New Critical Analysis". Journal of Communication. 33 (3): 117–127. doi:10.1111/j.1460-2466.1983.tb02413.x. In G. Gerbner (Ed.) Ferment in the Field
