= Hutchins Commission =

Inquiry into the responsibilities of American news media

The Hutchins Commission (whose official name was the Commission on Freedom of the Press) was formed during World War II, when Henry Luce (publisher of Time and Life magazines) asked Robert Hutchins (president of the University of Chicago) to recruit a commission to inquire into the proper function of the media in a modern democracy. One scholar views the commission as a response to criticism from the public and government over media ownership. Another sees it principally as the product of Luce's intellectual curiosity.

== Membership ==
Hutchins and Luce jointly chose members of the commission. The final group consisted of John M. Clark, John Dickinson, William E. Hocking, Harold Lasswell, Archibald MacLeish, Charles Merriam, Reinhold Niebuhr, Robert Redfield, Beardsley Ruml, Arthur Schlesinger Sr, and George N. Schuster, together with Hutchins as chairman and Zechariah Chaffee as vice-chairman. Although all members were prominent intellectuals with sterling reputations, none were journalists. Hutchins thought the commission would be more open-minded if it contained no journalists, but critics of the commission, particularly in the press, used that to attack its credentials.

== Conclusions & Social Responsibility Theory ==
After deliberating for four years, the Commission came to these conclusions in its final report, A Free and Responsible Press, published in 1947: the press plays essential roles in the development and stability of modern society and, as such, it is imperative that the press recognize and heed its responsibility to society. According to this social responsibility theory, the press has a moral obligation to consider the overall needs of society when making journalistic decisions in order to produce the greatest good. Though there had been journalism "codes of ethics" for decades, the commission's report was considered a landmark by some scholars, a pivotal assertion of the modern media's role in a democratic society.

Social-responsibility theory was born at a time (just after Franklin Roosevelt's death) when large and powerful publishers were unpopular with the public, and when the public had a high degree of suspicions about the motivations and objectives of the press. The press had mushroomed into an unwieldy and powerful entity, and criticism of the Fourth Estate was widespread. Critics contended that the media had monopolistic tendencies, that corporate owners were not concerned with the rights or interests of those unlike themselves, and that commercialization produced a debased culture as well as dangerously selfish politics.

Social-responsibility theory thus proposes that the media take it upon themselves to elevate society's standards, providing citizens with the information they need to govern themselves. It is in the best interest of the media to do this; if they do not, social theorists warn, the public will demand that the government regulate the media.

== Criticism ==
Some scholars (among them John C. Nerone) have speculated whether journalistic fairness and balance already existed prior to the commission's report. Were the commission's conclusions merely an "adjustment" in liberalism, brought on by perceived business demands? Libertarians (who prioritize individual liberty and seek to minimize the power of the state) are wary of the social-responsibility theory; they believe that responsibility means accountability, accountability means government intervention, and government intervention comes at the expense of liberty. Indeed, the Commission noted that continued misuse of press power would necessitate regulation.

== Sources ==
- Stephen Bates, An Aristocracy of Critics: Luce, Hutchins, Niebuhr, and the Committee That Redefined Freedom of the Press, Yale University Press (2020)
- John C. Nerone, Last Rights: Revisiting Four Theories of the Press, University of Illinois Press (1995), On Social Responsibility, pp. 77–100. Reprinted in McQuail's Reader in Mass Communication Theory, John C. Nerone, “Social Responsibility Theory,” Ch. 15.
