= College of the University of Chicago =

Undergraduate school of the University of Chicago

Coordinates: 41°47′16.7″N 87°35′58.5″W

- Motto: Quaerite scientiam; vita excolatur (Latin)
- Type: Private
- Established: 1892
- Dean: Melina Hale
- Students: 6,801
- Location: Chicago, Illinois, US
- Campus: Urban
- Website: college.uchicago.edu

The College of the University of Chicago is the undergraduate college of the University of Chicago.

The College is notable for pioneering a now-widespread model of the liberal arts undergraduate program with various innovations: adoption of the Socratic method in undergraduate contexts, the Great Books program, and the core curriculum. These modes, largely associated with reforms by former University chancellor Robert Maynard Hutchins, remain among the most expansive of well-regarded American colleges. Instruction is provided by faculty from across all graduate divisions and schools for its 6,801 students, but the College retains a select group of young, proprietary scholars who teach its core curriculum offerings. Unlike many major American research universities, the College is small in comparison to the University's graduate divisions, with graduate students outnumbering undergraduates at a 2:1 ratio. Within the College, instruction is marked by an emphasis on preparing students for continued graduate study. 85% of graduates go onto graduate study within 5 years of graduation, higher than any other university, and 15–20% go on to receive PhDs.

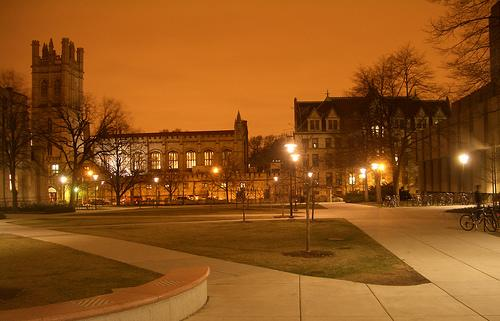
Campus lights illuminate the Bartlett Quadrangle.

== Academics ==
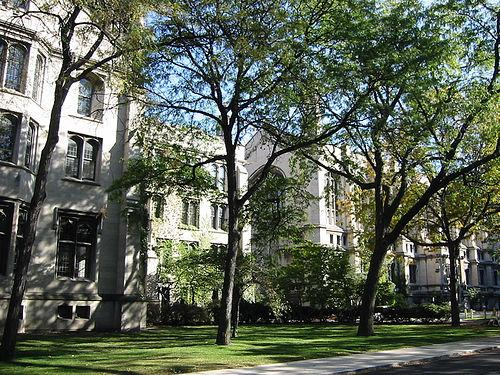
Many offices and classes of the College are located in the heart of the campus.

The college offers 52 majors. A primary departmental or committee affiliation is denoted for those whose names differ from that of their field designation. A student is awarded either the A.B. or S.B. degree. The college notably does not offer majors in pre-professional areas such as engineering (with the exception of the newly introduced Molecular Engineering program) or finance (with the exception of the newly introduced Business Economics Specialization, with coursework in Financial Accounting and Corporate Finance). Additionally, with a recently introduced competitive system for the allocation of undergraduate funding to major programs, in part based on student enrollment, students have seen widespread curricular change. The college recently introduced minors in a select numbers of fields, and also offers several joint bachelors / masters programs to high performing students in a variety of subjects.

=== Core curriculum ===
The University of Chicago requires all undergraduates to fulfill the Common Core, which demands work across all areas of the liberal arts for both A.B. and B.S. concentrators, albeit in a form reduced from the Hutchins era. Currently, 15 courses are required in addition to tested foreign language proficiency (one year of de novo study being expected as preparation) if no Advanced Placement or International Baccalaureate examinations are used for exemption (a reduction of six credits, or two full-time quarters, may be achieved via this method). While the science curriculum has largely followed the intellectual evolution of its respective fields, the requisite humanities and social science sequences now have several variants that encompass non-Western, non-canonical, and critical theory texts. This is a departure from the school's traditional ties to texts of the European tradition such as Plato and Locke. While in totality the core curriculum's goal is to impart an education that is both timeless and a vehicle for interdisciplinary debate, the increasing number of options to students within its confines produces a wide variety of backgrounds amongst graduates.

== Reputation and admissions ==
For 2016, 2017, 2018, and 2019 U.S. News & World Report ranked the University of Chicago third in the nation for undergraduate education, behind Princeton and Harvard, and tied with Yale.

In 2012, Forbes magazine ranked the University of Chicago's undergraduate program 4th in the country, ahead of every Ivy League institution except Princeton; it was also ranked 1st in the Midwest, 3rd among research universities, and 4th among private colleges. In 2010, Forbes also named the University of Chicago a "billionaire university," ranking the university as the 6th most successful in the country for producing billionaire alumni.

In 2007 Princeton Review named the College as having the "Best Undergraduate Academic Experience" in the United States. In the 2012 edition of The Best 376 Colleges, the Princeton Review ranked UChicago 7th for politically active students, 9th for students who study the most, 13th for the best college library, and named it a "best-value college"; the Princeton Review moreover finds that in general applicants to UChicago also simultaneously apply to Ivy League institutions and their associates.

In 2012, Newsweek ranked UChicago 5th for having happy students, 9th for academic rigor, and 12th for being stressful.

In 2012, the QS World University Rankings ranked the University of Chicago as the 4th best institution of higher learning in the United States, after MIT, Harvard, and Yale, as well as 8th in the entire world.

In addition, College Crunch, an online college admissions resource, ranked the University of Chicago as 1st in the country among colleges and universities for its undergraduate college.

The University also has the highest SAT ranges for admitted students of any school in the nation. For the class of 2015, the middle 50% range for combined math and reading SAT scores was 1420–1530.

Up until the 2007–2008 admissions cycle the school exclusively used a self-dubbed "Uncommon Application", and did not accept the more popular, nationalized Common Application, which can be sent to multiple institutions, for collegiate admissions. However, in 2009, the school adopted the Common Application and included a supplement that kept the spirit of the Uncommon Application. The cornerstone of the previously used Uncommon Application and the current supplement is a unique set of essay questions that have attracted a lot of attention for the school. Prompts have ranged from the bizarre, "Write an essay somehow inspired by super-huge mustard," to intentionally vague prompts such as "Find X" to esoteric quotes by famous individuals such as "mind that does not stick" – Zen Master Shoitsu (in this prompt, only the quote was provided; no question was asked). In the 2011–2012 season, there was a question that referenced a game in which students use Wikipedia to draw connections between seemingly unrelated things: "What does Play-Doh have to do with Plato?"

The school's acceptance rate fell to a record low of 7.2% for the class of 2022. In comparison, the acceptance rate was 8.7% for the class of 2021. The yield also hit a record-high 72% for the class of 2021, ranking as the fourth-highest in the country, behind only Harvard, Stanford and MIT.

In June 2018, as part of its new Empower initiative, the University announced that it would become the first major American research university to adopt a test-optional policy for undergraduate applicants, along with guaranteeing free tuition to students whose families made under $125,000 per year and expanding scholarships to veterans, as well as the children of police officers and firefighters.

== Culture ==
The College often publishes literature that emphasizes the "life of the mind," drawing attention to the school's serious academic environment. Alternatively, a popular phrase with students is "where fun comes to die," describing the school's lack of a stereotypical college party culture. Efforts in the 1990s, under President Hugo F. Sonnenschein to change some of these perceptions of the College were controversial, though ultimately successful.

Although Greek life is not predominant among the undergraduate population, there are several active fraternities and sororities that have established histories with the College, including Alpha Delta Phi, Alpha Epsilon Pi, Alpha Phi Alpha, Delta Kappa Epsilon, Delta Upsilon, Lambda Phi Epsilon, Phi Gamma Delta, Zeta Psi, Psi Upsilon, Sigma Chi, Sigma Phi Epsilon, Phi Delta Theta, and Pi Kappa Alpha fraternities, as well as alpha Kappa Delta Phi, Alpha Omicron Pi, Delta Gamma, Kappa Alpha Theta, and Pi Beta Phi sororities. The campus is also home to three coeducational professional Greek organizations, which are Alpha Phi Omega, a community service fraternity, Alpha Kappa Psi, a business fraternity, and Phi Alpha Delta, a pre-law fraternity.

In part due to shortfalls in investments in College endowment, a concerted effort has been made to expand enrollment of students from affluent regions such as New York City, London, Shanghai, and the Bay Area (the subdivided regions of a newly established College Parent Council, with a $25,000 minimum annual membership fee).

== Traditions ==
Summer Breeze, the University of Chicago's annual spring concert, typically attracts thousands of students. In 2006, George Clinton (pictured) headlined Summer Breeze.

- Summer Breeze – The university's annual summer carnival and concert, held in mid-May. Past musicians who have performed at Summer Breeze include The Roots, Spoon, Wilco, Eminem, Kanye West, Run–D.M.C., Cake, Andrew Bird, They Might Be Giants, Method Man, Moby, Fuel, Nas, Jurassic 5, U2, Miles Davis, Sonic Youth, Talib Kweli, Violent Femmes, OK Go, Mos Def, George Clinton, and recently Santigold and Broken Social Scene.
- One-Dollar Shake Day – Milkshakes sell for only one dollar every Wednesday at the Reynolds Club. The Einstein Bros. Bagels franchise was allowed to open on campus only after agreeing to adhere to this tradition, though with the 2017 closing of the Einstein Bagels location, dollar shakes has been moved to Hutchinson commons.
- Midnight Breakfast – A midnight breakfast is held during every "finals week" of the academic year, attracting students and faculty members alike.
- Track Team Streak – Before "finals week" of the winter quarter, the University of Chicago track and cross country team streaks through the Regenstein Library.
- O-Week – Every year since 1934, the University of Chicago has set time aside before classes begin to provide an introduction to the University for all new students.
- Lascivious Costume Ball – This event took place during the 1970–1984 period, and was a student-organized replacement of the Washington Promenade, a formal dance held in the winter since 1903, which annually crowned a Miss University of Chicago. Students would pay no fee if they came and uncloaked in the nude, a half-fee for wearing an appropriately lascivious (in the eyes of the students running the ball) costume, and full fee for remaining in "street clothes". The event was held in Ida Noyes Hall. It was formerly called the Sex Anarchy Party. This event was reinstated in November 2008, instituted by the HYPE student organization, though exposed genitalia were no longer (officially) allowed.
- Sleepout – Prior to 1993, undergraduate students would "sleep out" for classes with limited enrollment. The order of registration for classes was on a lottery basis, but in order for a student to keep his or her lottery number and avoid being reassigned to the end of the list, the student was required to physically remain on the campus quadrangle and present himself or herself at roll calls which were randomly and abruptly announced over the next few days. As a result, students would bring sleeping bags and tents and camp out on the quadrangle. Fraternities, sororities and other student groups would provide music and food, creating a festival atmosphere. The event terminated in 1993 when registration procedures changed.
- Kuviasungnerk/Kangeiko – A week-long festival celebrating Chicago in the winter. Often referred to as Kuvia, it entails a variety of events, including ice sculpting, hot chocolate get-togethers, musical performances, faculty fireside discussions, and a rigorous program of early morning exercise (Kangeiko, a Japanese tradition of winter training) that culminates in a yoga-influenced "salute to the sun", performed outdoors in freezing temperatures just before the sun rises. Kuviasungnerk/Kangeiko culminates in the Polar Bear Run on the Friday of the week, in which participants run, preferably naked or semi-naked, from one end of the main quad (Harper building) to the gates across from the Regenstein Library.
- The Great Latke-Hamantash Debate – Since 1946, an annual debate has been held, mainly between faculty members – most (but not all) of whom are Jewish – about the relative merits of latkes and hamantashen. These two Jewish delicacies are associated with the holidays of Hanukkah and Purim, respectively. The lectures provide an opportunity for ordinarily serious scholars to crack jokes in a mock-serious tone. The best were collected in a book edited by Ruth Fredman Cernea. The event is currently sponsored by University of Chicago Hillel chapter and Alpha Epsilon Pi, the Jewish fraternity.
- Virginio Ferrari's Dialogo and May Day. On May Day, students and residents of Hyde Park assemble near Pick Hall to watch the shadow cast by Virginio Ferrari's sculpture. Student legend holds that the sculpture casts a shadow that resembles a hammer and sickle on the sidewalk at noon on this day. In fact, the shadow produces an accurate sickle and an object in the position of the hammer, but the shape is not an exact copy of the symbol. Ferrari was first commissioned to build the sculpture to beautify what is now the new Economics building.
- Campus folklore – According to a common superstition among university students, stepping on University Seal (located in the main lobby of the Reynolds Club) as an undergraduate will prevent the student from graduating in four years. Another common superstition about the university is that nearly 50% of its students marry each other; a commonly stated, but unverified fact is that if two students date each other for more than three months, there is an 80% chance that they will marry. Finally, if two students kiss on the bridge over the pond inside the main gates of the campus, it is said they will be destined to wed each other.

=== Scavenger Hunt ===
The annual University of Chicago Scavenger Hunt is a multi-day event in which large teams compete to obtain all of the notoriously esoteric items on a list. Held every May since 1987, it is considered to be the largest scavenger hunt in the world. Established by student Chris Straus, "Scav" (as it is known among University students) has become one of the university's most popular traditions and has typically pushed the boundaries of absurdity. Each year, the list includes roughly 300 items, each with an assigned point value; the items vary widely, and often include performances, large-scale construction, technological construction, competition, and travel, as well as the traditional "find this item" listings. Most teams fall well short of completing half of the list and instead compete for total points amassed. The more difficult and time-consuming items earn more points, and teams typically devote more resources into these items.

== Athletics ==
The school's NCAA Division III teams, most of which are members of the University Athletic Association, are not a major focus on campus today, appearing almost "minimal" in their role on campus to "non-existent" according to students. However, in the first half of the twentieth century, the school was a powerhouse in Big Ten Conference play, notably in football where the school won numerous national championships, and produced the very first Heisman Trophy winner, Jay Berwanger. President Robert Maynard Hutchins suspended sports for several years though during his tenure fearing their digressive nature from academic endeavors, ending the prominence of most athletic programs. Today the many programs aim to cultivate the "student-athlete," the emphasis being on balance between the two. Varsity sports offered are baseball, football and wrestling for men, softball and volleyball for women, and basketball, cross country, soccer, swimming, tennis and track and field for both men and women.

== House system ==
The college employs a house system whereby undergraduates living in dormitories are assigned to a block of students of usually no more than 70 which serves as a focal point for university events. All campus dormitories contain multiple houses. Each building is overseen by a resident dean, and for each house within, a resident head. One or two upper division undergraduates are then selected to serve in addition as resident assistants for each house. All first and second years are required to live in housing, however, the availability of affordable, off campus apartments makes them a popular option with a sizable segment of the student body. Moreover, students are free to bid or request switches amid houses both between academic years and during them. The current buildings and attendant houses of the college are:

- Burton-Judson Courts (Chamberlin, Coulter, Dodd-Mead, Linn-Mathews, Salisbury, Vincent)
- Campus North Residential Commons (Behar, Boyer, Dougan-Niklason, Rogers, Strongin, Thangaraj, Trott, Yuen)
- International House (Booth, Breckinridge, Phoenix, Shorey, Thompson)
- Max Palevsky Residential Commons (Alper, Flint, Graham, Hoover, May, Rickert, Wallace, Woodward)
- Snell-Hitchcock Hall (Snell, Hitchcock)
- Granville-Grossman Residential Commons (formerly South Campus) (Cathey, Crown, DelGiorno, Halperin, Jannotta, Keller, Kenwood, Wendt)
- Woodlawn Residential Commons (Baker, Casner, Fama, Gallo, Rustandy, Yovovich, Chenn, Eka, Han, Liew, Markovitz)
