= Scav Hunt =

Scav Hunt can refer to any Scavenger Hunt in general, but is usually an abbreviation used to refer to a specific Scavenger Hunt. In particular it is the affectionate term for one of:

- University of Chicago Scavenger Hunt - the Hunt run out of UofC since 1987
- University of Melbourne Scavenger Hunt - the culmination of Melbourne University's Prosh Week, a tradition dating back to the mid 20th century
