= Gene Siskel Film Center =

Building in Chicago named for the late film critic Gene Siskel

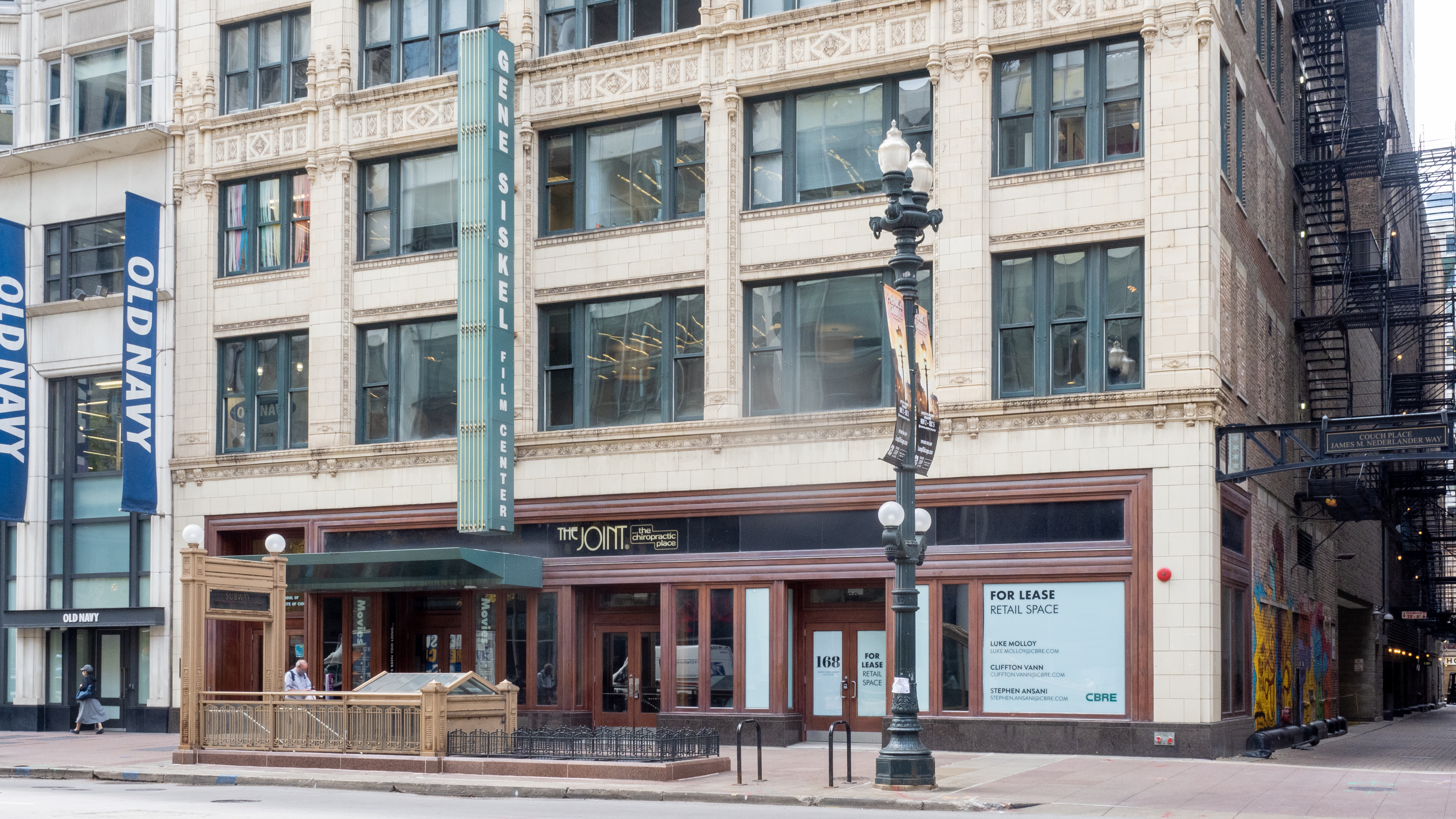
- The building in 2021
- Formation: 1972
- Type: 501(c)3
- Purpose: Cinema
- Location(s): 164 N State St, Chicago, Illinois, United States
- Coordinates: 41.884933°N 87.628180°W
- Parent organization: School of the Art Institute of Chicago
- Website: www.siskelfilmcenter.org
- Formerly called: The Film Center of the School of the Art Institute of Chicago

The Gene Siskel Film Center, formerly the Film Center of the School of the Art Institute of Chicago and commonly referred to as the Film Center or the Gene Siskel, is the cinematheque attached to The School of the Art Institute of Chicago. It is named after popular film critic Gene Siskel.

Along with Doc Films at the University of Chicago and the Block Museum of Northwestern University, the Film Center is one of Chicago's key revival houses, and hosts at least one major retrospective per month. Unlike Doc or Block, the Film Center also serves as a venue for first runs of foreign and independent films and is not student-run. Amongst other things, this means the Film Center maintains a year-round staff and does not cease operation when The School of the Art Institute closes for semester breaks.

The Film Center reportedly averages 1,500 screenings a year.

== History ==
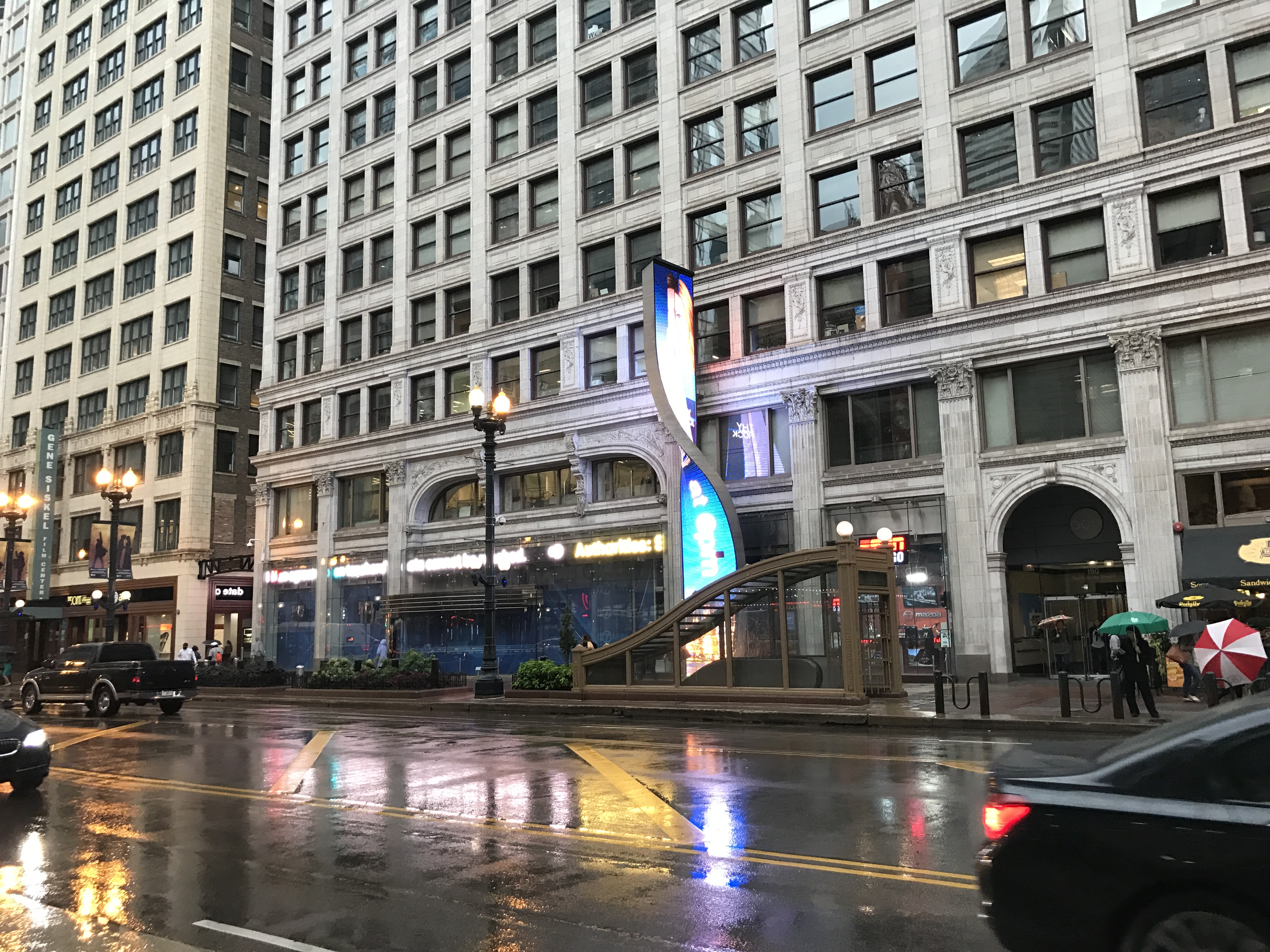
The Gene Siskel Film Center (left), directly south of the ABC Building, where WLS-TV and WMVP reside and where the Buena Vista Television iteration of Siskel & Ebert was recorded weekly.

The Film Center grew from a monthly cinema series curated by Camille Cook and was established as The Film Center of the School of the Art Institute of Chicago in 1972. With support from a National Endowment for the Arts grant awarded to Cook, it began screenings in Fullerton Hall at the Art Institute of Chicago and moved to a new SAIC facility on Columbus Drive in July 1976. Renamed for film critic Gene Siskel in 2000, it moved to its current State Street location in 2001. The current location is directly across the street from the Chicago Theatre and directly south of the ABC Building (itself formerly the Balaban and Katz-ran State–Lake Theater), where Siskel & Ebert and successor series Ebert & Roeper recorded weekly from 1996 until 2008.

In September 1974, the center hosted Films by Women/Chicago '74. Organized by an all-woman collective with support from the Chicago Tribune, the festival presented more than 70 films from around the world and was the most comprehensive survey of women's cinema held in the United States to that point.

The center suspended in-person screenings in March 2020 during the COVID-19 pandemic and shifted to virtual programming. It reopened on August 6, 2021, after a 17-month hiatus. In May 2023, Emily Long succeeded Jean de St. Aubin as executive director.

Its current facilities, which consist of two theaters capable of projecting most formats, are considered state-of-the-art.
