= Chicago Hearing =

The official Chicago Hearing seal

On Sunday, April 18, 2010, the American Friends Service Committee (AFSC) initiated an event titled "The Chicago Hearing: Does U.S. Policy on Israel and Palestine Uphold Our Values?", modeled after a meeting of a United States Congressional fact-finding committee.

The event was held at the University of Chicago's Hyde Park campus in Ida Noyes Hall. More than 250 people attended the event in person, while a national and international audience watched via live webcast.

A panel of faith leaders, community organizers and academics heard expert witnesses testify to the impact of U.S. policy on Israel-Palestine.

The AFSC stated that the hearing "highlighted voices of those on the other end of the pipeline of U.S. aid to Israel." Discussion was moderated by Helena Cobban, a journalist and owner of the "Just World News" website as well as "Just World Books" publishing.

Resources are hosted on the Chicago Hearing's website, including:

- Fact sheets on property rights, freedom of movement and military aid to Israel
- A 28-page Final Report, gathering summaries of witness testimony; background information on U.S. policy; and data that reveals the impact of closure policies, military assaults, and military aid transfers on the situation
- An "enhanced video" of the event, supplemented with data, graphics, and footage from Israel and Palestine
- A how-to guide on organizing a Mock Congressional Hearing

== Context ==
The American Friends Service Committee is a "Quaker organization that includes people of various faiths who are committed to social justice, peace and humanitarian service."

The AFSC began working in the Middle East in 1949. The organization, along with the International Committee of the Red Cross and the League of Red Cross Societies, was asked by the United Nations to organize relief work for Palestinian refugees in the Gaza Strip.

== Witnesses ==
The hearing heard testimony from four "witnesses" to U.S. Policy in Israel and Palestine.

- Cindy Corrie is the mother of Rachel Corrie, an American activist who was crushed by a bulldozer attempting to demolish a house in the Gaza Strip in 2003. She is president of the Rachel Corrie Foundation for Peace & Justice.
- Jeff Halper is an anthropologist and Coordinator of the Israeli Committee Against House Demolitions (ICAHD), a "non-violent, direct-action organization" which he helped to establish in 1997. The ICAHD's stated goal is to resist Israeli demolition of Palestinian homes in the Occupied Territories.
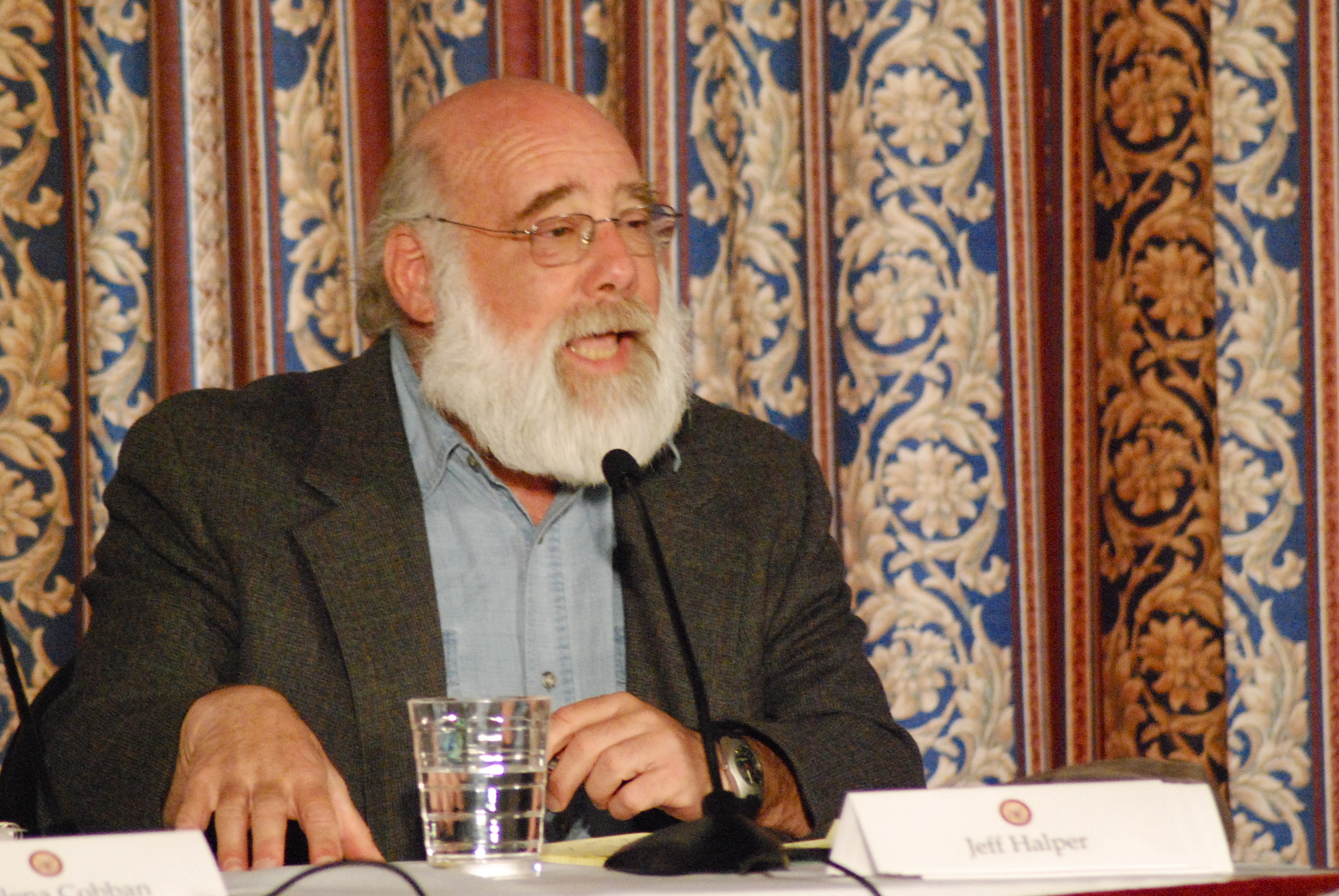
  Jeff Halper of the Israeli Committee Against House Demolitions
- Jad Isaac is an environmental expert and Director General of the Applied Research Institute–Jerusalem in the West Bank. He was formerly Dean of Science at Bethlehem University.
- Amer Shurrab is an Arab Palestinian from Gaza whose two brothers were killed by Israel Defense Forces during Israel's "Operation: Cast Lead" in the winter of 2008-2009. He is a member of Seeds of Peace, a peace-building youth organization in New York City.

== Listener Panel ==
A panel of academics and religious leaders heard the testimony of the witnesses, and afterward asked questions.

- Yali Amit is a professor in the Department of Computer Science and Statistics at the University of Chicago. He is also a Coordinating Committee Member for the Arab-Jewish Partnership.
- Cantor Michael Davis is a member of the Jewish Fast for Gaza, a group of "rabbis, Jews, and people of conscience" who undertake a monthly daytime fast in support of goals which foster peace in Israel-Palestine.
- Cotton Fite is an associate priest at St. Luke's Episcopal Church in Evanston, Illinois and a member of the Chicago Faith Coalition on Middle East Policy.
- John J. Mearsheimer is the R. Wendell Harrison Distinguished Service Professor of Political Science at the University of Chicago.
- Barbara Ransby is an associate professor of Gender and Women's Studies, African American Studies, and History at the University of Illinois-Chicago.
- Dr. Zaher Sahloul is a physician at Advocate Christ Medical Center in Oak Lawn, Illinois and chairman of the Council of Islamic Organizations of Greater Chicago.
- Ghada Talhami is the D.K. Pearsons Professor Emeritus of Politics at Lake Forest College in Illinois.

== Testimony ==
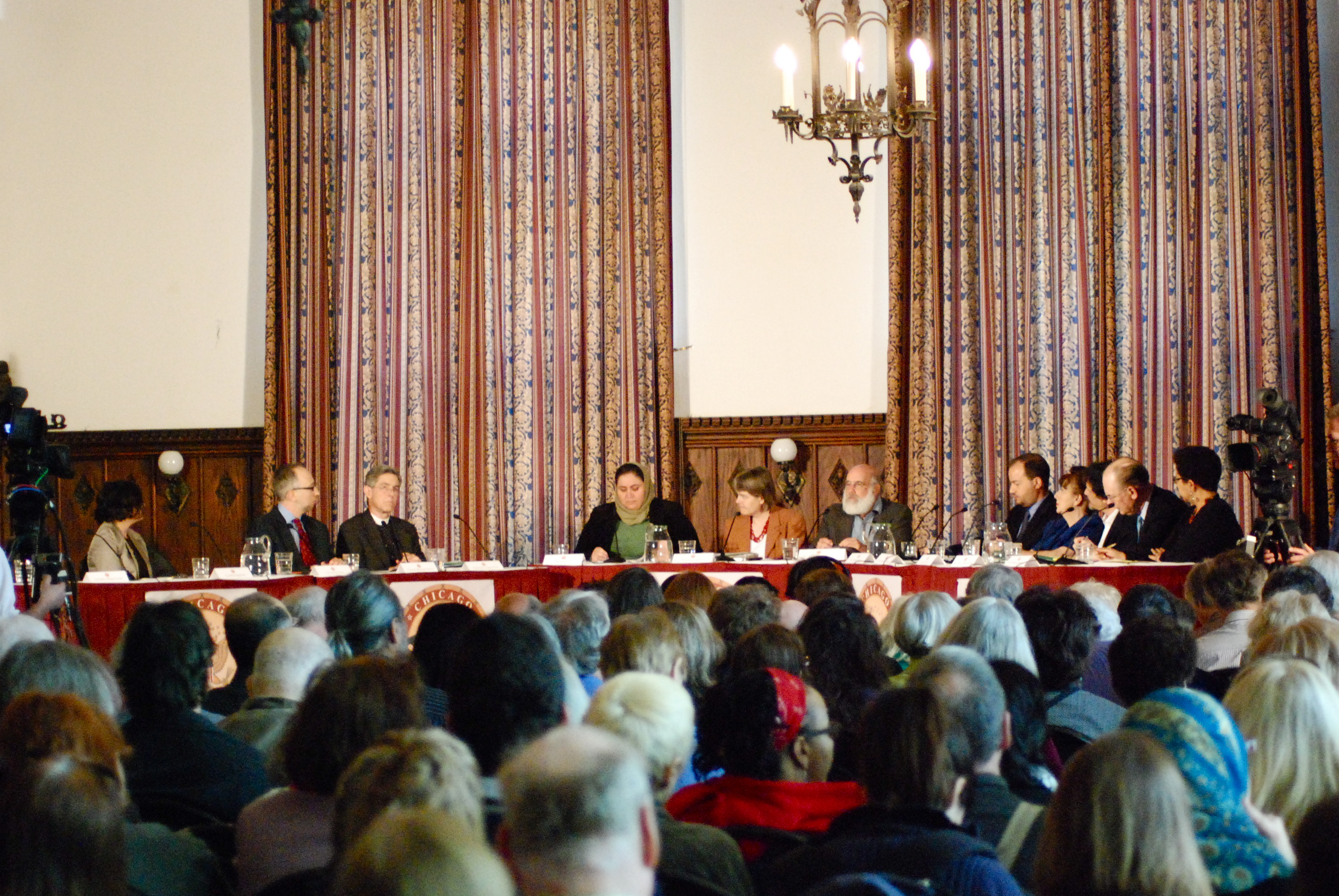
The Chicago Hearing panel

The testimonies of the witnesses and the subsequent questions fell into three categories: Property Rights; Freedom of Movement, Association and Speech; and Military Aid and Armaments.

A speaker explained the context of each topic and introduced the speaker(s).

=== Property Rights ===
This issue was introduced by Mezna Qato, a Palestinian-American and human rights activist completing her doctorate at Oxford University.

Jeff Halper of the Israeli Committee Against House Demolitions spoke extensively about the property right issues which came into being following the creation of the state of Israel in 1948, and how they continue today.

"In 1948, 94 percent of the country that was called Palestine...was owned by Palestinians. By the end of 1949...94 percent of the land that became Israel was now in Israeli Jewish hands."

=== Freedom of Movement, Association and Speech ===
Lisa Kosowski, daughter of a Holocaust survivor and a board member of the Arab-Jewish Partnership, introduced this topic.

Jad Isaac spoke about the physical and administrative obstacles which impede Palestinians' freedom of movement within the occupied territories.

He used as a case example the time it takes to travel between the cities of Jenin and Hebron in Israel-Palestine, a distance of about 80 miles. For an Israeli, Isaac said the trip would take about an hour. For a Palestinian, who must travel on separate roads and go through many more security checkpoints, the trip would take about four hours, said Isaac.

=== Military Aid and Armaments ===
The witnesses were introduced by Josh Ruebner, National Advocacy Director for the U.S. Campaign to End the Israeli Occupation.

Cindy Corrie and Amer Shurrab both gave their personal testimonies on this issue.

Shurrab told the panel that IDF soldiers had fired, unprovoked, on a vehicle containing his father and two brothers, leading to the death of the brothers. He also described how the IDF would not allow an ambulance to enter the area for 11 hours after the shooting, leading to one of his brothers dying from blood loss due to a non-fatal leg wound.

Corrie related the story of her daughter's activism in Gaza. Rachel Corrie stood in front of a Caterpillar bulldozer in order to prevent it from demolishing a Palestinian home. The bulldozer continued on its path, crushing Rachel to death.

== Findings and Conclusions ==
The Chicago Hearing's Organizing Committee published a 28-page Final Report which includes summaries of the testimonies as well as detailed maps, charts and statistics regarding U.S. policy in Israel and Palestine.
