= Dave Kehr =

American film critic (born 1953)

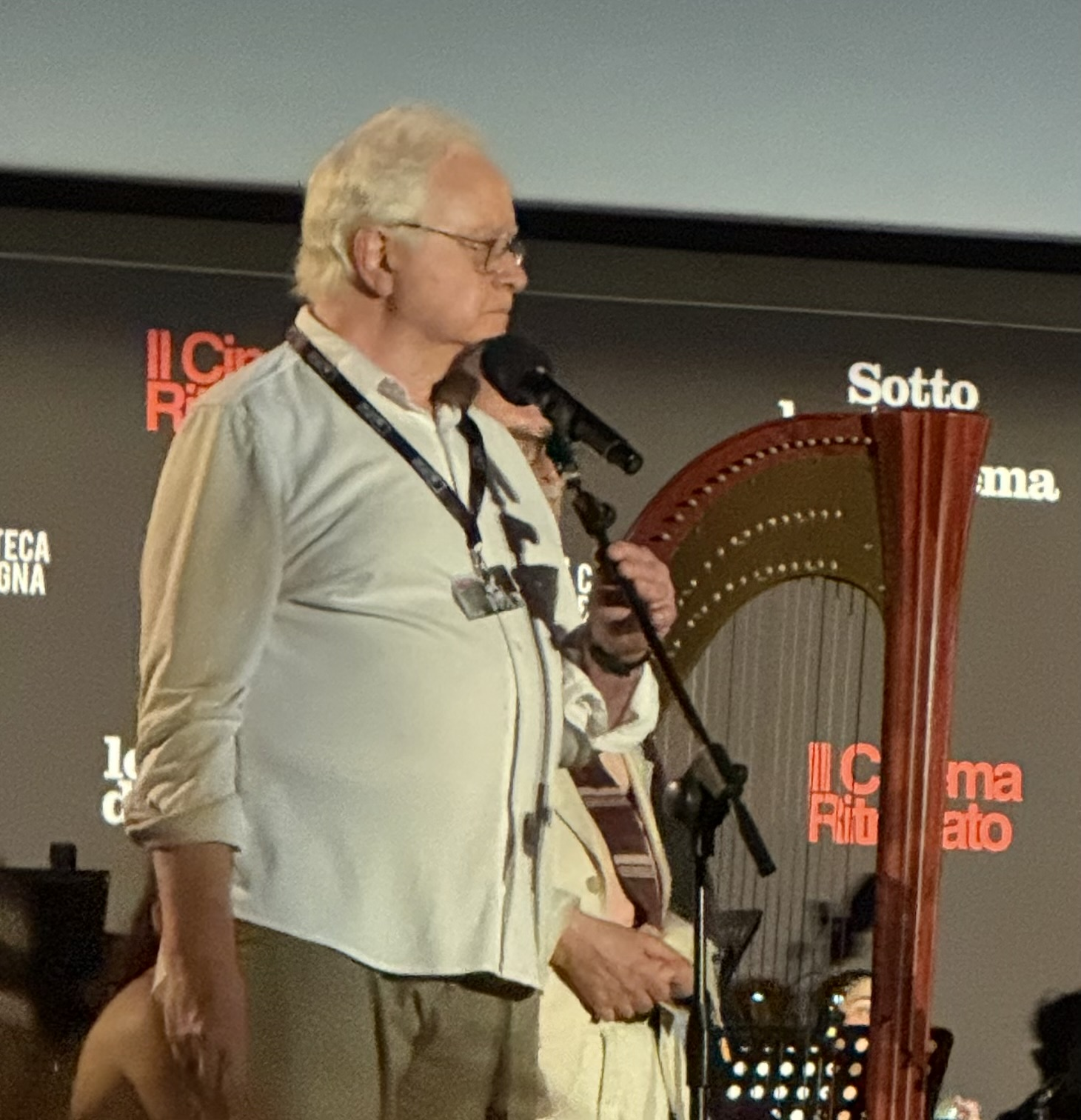
- Kehr in 2026
- Born: 1953 (age 72–73); United States
- Education: University of Chicago
- Occupations: Author, journalist, film historian, film critic, curator
- Years active: 1974–present

David Kehr (/kɜːr/ KUR; born 1953) is an American museum curator and film critic. For many years a critic at the Chicago Reader and the Chicago Tribune, he later wrote a weekly column for The New York Times on DVD releases. He later became a curator within the department of film at the Museum of Modern Art.

== Early life and education ==
Dave Kehr did his undergraduate work at the University of Chicago, where he studied English. He learned French in part to read Cahiers du cinéma. At the time the university did not have a film studies curriculum. He started writing on film for The Maroon, the student newspaper, when he was president of the film society, Doc Films.

== Career ==
From 1974 to 1985, Kehr wrote for The Chicago Reader, where he established a reputation for independent thinking and an understanding of visual style. Until 1978, he edited The Reader's question and answer column, "The Straight Dope".

He next wrote as a film critic for The Chicago Tribune (1986–1992). He moved to the East Coast to become film critic for the New York Daily News (1993–1998). In 1995, he was a member of the jury at the 45th Berlin International Film Festival. Kehr is a past chairman of the National Society of Film Critics, and a member of the National Film Preservation Board of the Library of Congress.

Beginning in 1999, Kehr wrote a weekly column for The New York Times on DVD releases, also contributing occasional pieces on individual filmmakers or films. While at the Times, Kehr also produced a film blog, with reviews of films and occasional comment pieces.

Kehr left the New York Times in late 2013 to work as Adjunct Curator in the film department of the Museum of Modern Art. In 2017, he was promoted to curator.

Kehr participated in the 2012 Sight & Sound critics' poll, where he listed his ten favorite films as follows: The Big Trail, Contempt, The Docks of New York, Intolerance, Journey to Italy, Make Way for Tomorrow, Playtime, Sansho the Bailiff, The Searchers, and Vertigo.

In 2017, Kehr was named a Chevalier of the Ordre des Arts et des Lettres, a cultural award given by the French government.

== Published works ==
- Kehr, Dave (2003). Italian Film Posters. New York: The Museum of Modern Art.
- Kehr, Dave (2011). When Movies Mattered: Reviews from a Transformative Decade. Chicago: University of Chicago Press.
- Kehr, Dave (2017). Movies That Mattered: More Reviews from a Transformative Decade. Chicago: University of Chicago Press.
