= The Chicago Maroon =

Student newspaper of the University of Chicago

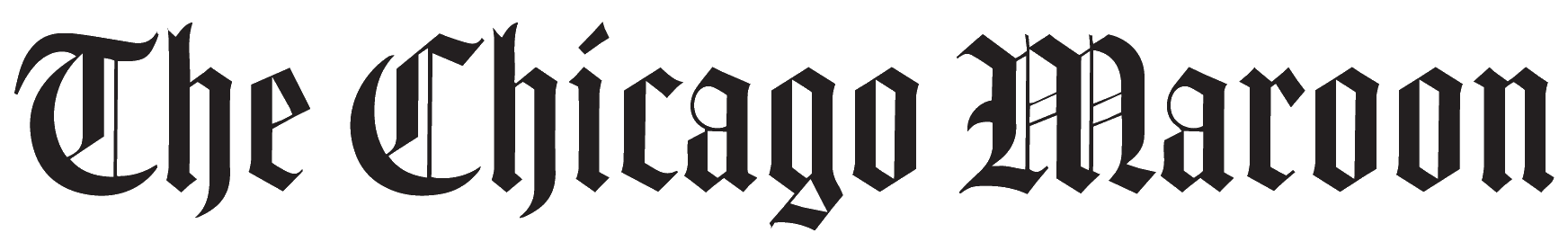
- Type: Student newspaper
- Format: Broadsheet
- Editor-in-chief: Celeste Alcalay; Anika Krishnaswamy
- Managing editor: Gabriel Kraemer; Nathaniel Rodwell-Simon
- Founded: 1892
- Headquarters: Ida Noyes Hall; 1212 East 59th Street; Chicago, Illinois 60637
- Circulation: 2,500
- Website: chicagomaroon.com

The Chicago Maroon is the independent student-run newspaper of the University of Chicago and a biweekly publication founded in 1892. During the academic year, The Maroon publishes every other Wednesday. The paper consists of seven sections: news, opinion ("Viewpoints"), arts and culture, sports, Grey City, podcasts, and games. In September, it publishes its annual Orientation Issue (O-Issue) for entering first-year students, including sections on the University and the city of Chicago.

== About The Maroon ==
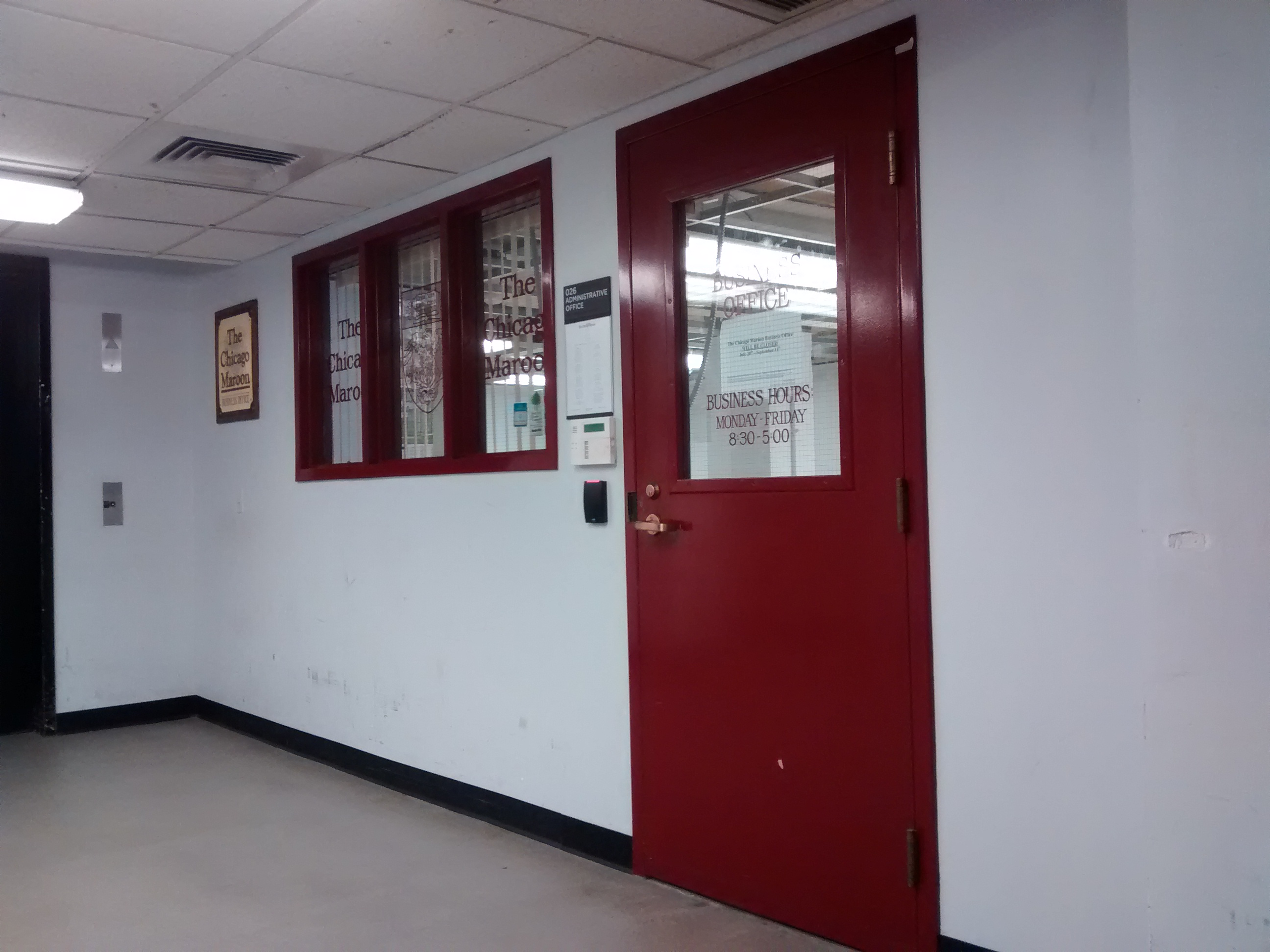
The Chicago Maroon business office in Ida Noyes Hall

Any student at the University of Chicago can contribute to the newspaper, and many go through training and complete a series of requirements to join The Maroon as a staff member. Although the requirements have changed over time, the process of joining staff has traditionally been called "hustling." The editorial board explained in 1903 that when the newspaper changed from a weekly to a daily, many more students were needed to produce the paper, so they "hustled" (meaning both "to sell or promote energetically and aggressively" and "to convey forcibly or hurriedly") new writers and editors from the student body.

The executive board of The Maroon is composed of its editor(s)-in-chief and managing editor(s), which are elected in the winter by voting-eligible members of the newspaper's staff. There are roughly 20 editors that control the content and production of the different sections. Unsigned opinion articles are written by the Maroon Editorial Board, which consists of editors of the paper. In addition to the editorial and journalistic staff, The Maroon also has a group of students running its business operations, led by a chief financial officer. In turn, the Maroon Business Team is composed of the development, marketing, operations and strategy teams. The Maroon Advisory Board consists of a handful of University of Chicago faculty members and administrators that meet quarterly to review the newspaper's finances. The Chicago Maroon is financially and editorially independent from the university.

Over its history The Maroon served as publisher of other independent papers at the University of Chicago, including the Grey City Journal, a weekly journal of arts and culture which featured some of the first cultural criticism by Thomas Frank, the Chicago Literary Review, a quarterly showcase for poetry and short fiction, and The Fourth Estate, the "Conservative Brother Publication of The Chicago Maroon." Currently, The Maroon publishes every other Wednesday. It formerly printed Grey City, its twice-quarterly long-form supplement to the paper, but this is now a section fully integrated into the main paper.

== History ==
The Chicago Maroon has gone through many variations and formats, but considers 1892 to be the year of its establishment. It remains the only student organization at the University of Chicago that can trace its history to the first day the University of Chicago opened its doors to students.

=== The University of Chicago Weekly ===
A report on the history of The Maroon compiled for its centennial celebration begins, "When the U of C opened in October 1892, students were already on campus selling the U of C Weekly," which was the parent publication of the Maroon in its current form. The Weekly was established by two graduate students, Emory Forster and Jack Durno, and served as a student-run news and literary publication, even though it was owned by a local businessman.

Several publications were attempted in the first decade of the university's operation, but The Weekly was the only one that managed to stay afloat. The first of these abortive efforts was The Maroon, a daily paper published from October 17, 1892, to April 19, 1893. The next attempt was a thrice-weekly newspaper, also called The Maroon, which published from May 15, 1895, to March 20, 1896. The last was another daily, this time called The Daily Maroon, whose founding was plagued with difficulties: Days after its first printing on May 7, 1900, the Faculty Board of Student Organizations suspended the publication because "the editors were duped into printing a supposed scandal." After another failed effort later that spring, The Daily Maroon died for a second and final time.

=== The Daily Maroon ===
Herbert Fleming (A.B. 1902) and Byron Moon, The Weekly's managing editor and owner/publisher respectively, proposed to university President William Rainey Harper a merger between The Weekly and The Daily Maroon. Harper accepted the proposal, with the condition that the paper would be financially autonomous from the university. Moon and Fleming, along with eight others, were appointed by the Board of Student Organizations to the Board of Control. Together, they persuaded the Alumni Association to front the necessary funds to start publishing, with the proposal that the paper should be owned by the entire student body. The 10 members of the Board of Control assumed all other financial responsibility for the paper's first year, with profits or losses being divided equally.

The Weekly stopped printing the same day The Daily Maroon started, choosing to "close its career on October 1, 1902, to make room for its successors." During its first decade, The Daily Maroon focused on raising student enthusiasm for sports teams, and served as a bulletin board and calendar for social activities. Headlines consistently trumpeted the "Monsters of the Midway's" upcoming games, reviewed old ones, and printed new sports cheers and poems honoring the university.

In 1906, when the university won the national college football championship, The Daily Maroon joined the festivities by printing the story in maroon and black. That year, the paper began printing in the morning, instead of afternoon, so students and faculty could read it during breakfast.

=== The Maroon ===
During World War II, printing a daily newspaper became infeasible because of both staff writers leaving the university to fight and decreased financial support during hard times. The Daily Maroon was changed to a weekly format, called The Maroon, in 1942. The inaugural issue began with an editorial by Phil Rieff, the editor-in-chief:

"And so we go to Press. Smaller. Fewer. The Maroon is not what it used to be. But that is nothing to be sad about. We are sad because the Maroon is not what it should be. We had intended to publish twice a week. We had hopes of making the Maroon a significant organ of University opinion. We had even had gone so far as to contact certain faculty men and arrange for vital articles on contemporary issues. If we could serve the University, as a stimulus, a guide, an organ of critical thought during these critical times... That was our aim."

During these years, The Maroon was composed mainly of women, men too young to serve in the forces, and older men who were exempt from military service. The most notable change in the paper's appearance after the war was that it did not return to a daily, but printed Tuesdays and Fridays, which it continues to do. Its prewar structure, based on downtown Chicago newspapers, was not restored, and classes became the top priority for most staff members.

The Maroon also revised its distribution during that time. When it first appeared in 1902, it cost two cents an issue to defray the costs of printing. The price gradually increased to 5 cents by the 1940s. On June 27, 1947, The Maroon was distributed free of charge "in order to assure the widest possible distribution." Increased ad revenue and financial support from the administration helped offset the losses from becoming non-subscription-based. In 1955, the paper also moved to Ida Noyes Hall, its current location, from Lexington Hall, which is no longer standing.

When David Broder was elected editor-in-chief in 1948, he put The Maroon on the path to recovery by publishing a daily bulletin on days the newspaper didn't print and increased circulation from 3,000 to 22,000.

The Maroon became more political over the following decades, prompting the dean of students to force the removal of editor-in-chief Alan Kimmel in 1951 and hold a university-wide election for the position. The newspaper continued to be highly political in the 1960s, and was even considered militant. During a campus sit-in after the firing of a radical sociology professor, Marlene Dixon, in 1968, The Maroon published daily and editors met with University President Edward Levi in his house while his office was being occupied by students.

During the late 1970s and early 1980s, The Maroon focused printing a neutral newspaper with political sister publications. Grey City Journal, which was subsequently the newspaper's quarterly magazine, espoused liberal politics, opinion, and criticism. After gaining significant criticism, editor John Scalzi decided to create a conservative brother publication, The Fourth Estate, to balance the paper ideologically. With these weekly sections, the paper grew to its largest size, but because the publications did not bring in their own ad revenue, The Maroon dropped them in the 1990s.

During the 21st century, The Maroon has gone through several redesigns in print and online to improve the layout and create a more modern appeal.

== Awards ==
In 2007 and 2009, The Maroon won a National Pacemaker Award, the Associated Collegiate Press' highest honor. Staff writers at The Maroon win a number of awards annually from the Illinois College Press Association.

== Notable alumni ==
The University of Chicago has produced a number of notable journalists and writers, many of whom were Chicago Maroon staffers.

- David Auburn (A.B. 1991) Pulitzer prize and Tony award-winning playwright of Proof
- David Axelrod (A.B. 1977) Senior Advisor to President Barack Obama and Obama's chief strategist
- Jim Barnett (A.B. 1949) Professional wrestling promoter
- David Brooks (A.B. 1983) Staff Writer for The Atlantic; Op-Ed Columnist for The New York Times; senior editor of The Weekly Standard; regular commentator on The NewsHour with Jim Lehrer
- David S. Broder (A.B. 1947, A.M. 1951) Pulitzer prize-winning journalist, wrote a syndicated column for The Washington Post.
- Daniel Hertzberg (A.B. 1968) Pulitzer prize-winning journalist and Managing Editor for The Wall Street Journal
- Ana Marie Cox (A.B. 1994) Editor of Wonkette weblog
- Thomas Frank (A.M. 1989, Ph.D. 1994) Editor-in-chief of The Baffler; author of The Conquest of Cool (1997) and What's the Matter with Kansas? (2004)
- Seymour Hersh (A.B. 1958) Pulitzer prize-winning investigative journalist and frequent writer for The New Yorker
- Nathan Hare (A.M. 1957, Ph.D. 1962) Author, activist, and sociologist; founding publisher of The Black Scholar, later cited as, "the most important journal devoted to black issues since the Crisis," by The New York Times
- Sarah Langs (A.B. 2015) Researcher and podcaster for MLB.com, formerly of ESPN and NBC Sports Chicago
- Erin McKean (A.B. 1993) Lexicographer Principal Editor of The New Oxford American Dictionary, second edition., novelist, and founder of Wordnik.com
- John G. Morris (A.B. 1937) Internationally known Picture Editor for Life, Ladies' Home Journal, Magnum, The Washington Post, and The New York Times.
- Greg Palast (A.B. 1974, M.B.A. 1976) Progressive investigative journalist
- Andrew Patner (X' 1980) Music and arts critic for the Chicago Sun-Times and WFMT
- John Podhoretz (A.B. 1982) Conservative commentator for National Review, New York Post, The Weekly Standard, inter alia; son of Norman Podhoretz
- David Satter Moscow correspondent for the London Financial Times, Author of Age of Delirium: the Decline and Fall of the Soviet Union and Darkness at Dawn: the Rise of the Russian Criminal State
- Joshua Cooper Ramo (A.B. 1992) Foreign Editor of Time magazine, Author No Visible Horizon, Beijing Consensus, Managing Director Kissinger Associates
- John Scalzi (A.B. 1991) Hugo award-winning writer, blogger and novelist (Old Man's War)
- Nate Silver (A.B. 2000) Author-editor of FiveThirtyEight
- Robert B. Silvers (A.B. 1947) Co-founding Editor of The New York Review of Books
- Brent Staples (A.M. 1976, Ph.D. 1982) Editorial writer for The New York Times (1990–present); winner of the Anisfield Wolff Book Award for his memoir Parallel Time: Growing Up in Black and White (1994)
- John Paul Stevens (A.B. 1941) Third longest serving Justice on the Supreme Court, from 1975 to 2010
- Ray Suarez (A.M. 1993) Senior Correspondent on PBS news program The NewsHour with Jim Lehrer
- Kinsey Wilson (A.B. 1979) Founder of Newspack, Former President of Wordpress, Former Executive Editor of USA Today
- Tucker Max (A.B. 1998) Author
