= Melina Hale =

American neuroscientist

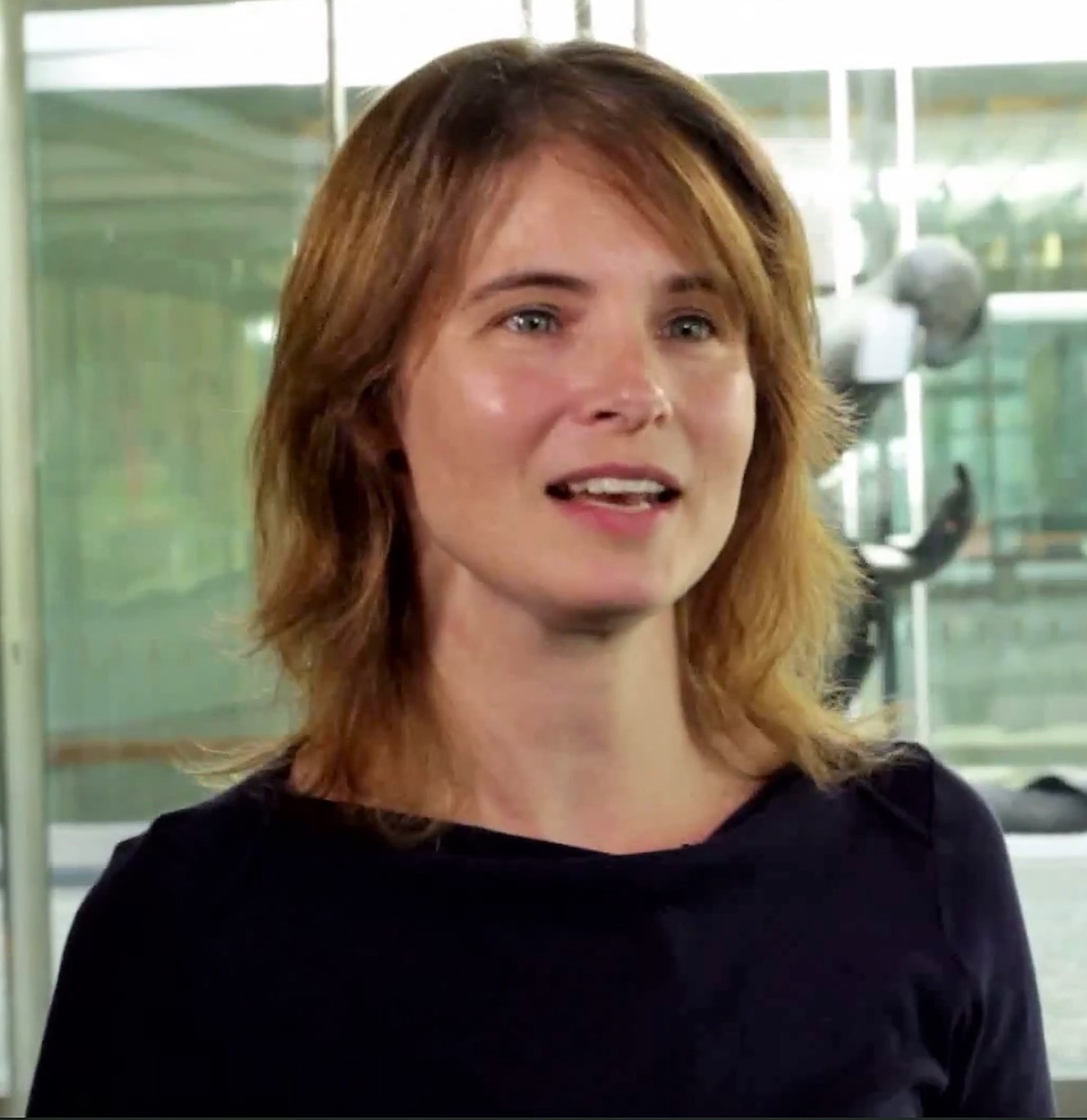
- Hale speaks to the National Science Foundation in 2014
- Education: Duke University (BS); University of Chicago (PhD)
- Occupation: Professor
- Employer: University of Chicago

Melina Elisabeth Hale is an American neuroscientist and biomechanist. She is the dean of the College and the William Rainey Harper Professor in the Department of Organismal Biology and Anatomy, at the University of Chicago.

She studies zebrafish and other organisms to understand the role of mechanosensation in limb movement and how circuits in the brain and spinal cord control and coordinate movement more generally, in addition to their evolution.

== Education and career ==
Hale received her B.S. in Zoology from Duke University in 1992 and her Ph.D. in Organismal Biology from the University of Chicago in 1998. She is a professor of Organismal Biology and Anatomy and Neurobiology and Computational Neuroscience at the University of Chicago. She was a Postdoctoral Fellow (1998-2001) at SUNY Stony Brook in the Department of Neurobiology and a Grass Fellow (2000) at the Marine Biological Laboratory in Woods Hole, MA.

Hale has been a faculty member at the University of Chicago since 2002 and is currently the William Rainey Harper Professor in the Department of Organismal Biology and Anatomy. She has served in various administrative roles including as Dean for Faculty Affairs in the Biological Sciences Division (2013-2016) and Vice Provost (2016-). She also served as Co-Interim Director at the Marine Biological Laboratory in Woods Hole, MA from 2017-2018.

As of April 12th, 2023, Hale has been appointed as the new dean of the University of Chicago College, effective July 1st 2023. She succeeds John W Boyer, the Martin A. Ryerson Distinguished Service Professor of History, who had previously held the post for more than 30 years.

She serves as President (2021-2023) for the Society for Integrative and Comparative Biology (SICB) and has previously served as chair in the Division of Comparative Biomechanics and in other roles. She was the keynote speaker at the Southeast regional meeting of the Society for Integrative and Comparative Biology (SICB).

== Research ==
Hale's research examines fundamental principles of sensorimotor integration and movement to better understand biological neuromechanical systems and to inform the design of underwater robotic devices. Her work has been funded by the U.S. National Science Foundation and the U.S. Office of Naval Research.

In 2015, her team demonstrated that fish use fins to sense their environment in order to modulate swimming. Their work since has further refined understanding of mechanosensation in membranous fins, including 2020 published work report on encoding properties of skin mechanosensors.

== Awards ==
Hale has received the following awards:

- Wayne C. Booth Graduate Student Prize for Excellence in Teaching at the University of Chicago
- Faculty Award for Excellence in Teaching and Mentoring at the University of Chicago
- National Science Foundation CAREER Award
- National Academies/Howard Hughes Medical Institute Education Fellow
- Defense Science Study Group Fellow, Institute for Defense Analysis
- Fellow of the American Association for the Advancement of Science

== Selected works ==
- Hale ME, Long JH Jr, McHenry MJ, Westneat MW. (2002) Evolution of behavior and neural control of the fast-start escape response. Evolution 56(5):993-1007. PMID 12093034
- Bierman HS, Schriefer JE, Zottoli SJ, Hale ME. (2004) The effects of head and tail stimulation on the withdrawal startle response of the rope fish (Erpetoichthys calabaricus).J Exp Biol. 207(Pt 22):3985-97. PMID 15472029
- Bierman HS, Zottoli SJ, Hale ME. (2009) Evolution of the Mauthner axon cap. Brain Behav Evol. 73(3):174-87. PMID 19494486
- Liu YC, Hale ME. (2014) Alternative forms of axial startle behaviors in fishes. Zoology (Jena). 117(1):36-47. PMID 24374038
- Hale ME. (2014) Mapping circuits beyond the models: integrating connectomics and comparative neuroscience. Neuron. 83(6):1256-8. Review. PMID 25233308
