= Lascivious Costume Ball =

The Lascivious Costume Ball is an annual masquerade ball held by the University of Chicago in Ida Noyes Hall. Founded by students in 1970, it was created as a rejection of the Washington Promenade, a formal dance held since 1903. Students would pay no fee if they came in the nude, half price for wearing a lascivious costume, and full price for remaining in "street clothes". It was held irregularly between 1970 and 1984 and was cancelled by school president Hanna Holborn Gray after that year's ball sent numerous students to the emergency room and provoked negative publicity. It was revived as an annual event in 2008 as a celebration of sexual diversity.

== Bibliography ==
- Reynolds, Celene (2 November 2017). "From Transgression to Tradition: Relationality, Organizational Absorption, and the Lascivious Costume Ball, 1970–1984". Organization. 24 (6): 916–937. doi:10.1177/1350508417699715. S2CID 149256550.
- Zimmerman, Sarah (25 October 2016). "Living Lasciviously". The College.
