= Shurrab family =

The Shurrab family is a family in Khan Younis and Gaza in the Palestinian territories, which had 2 members killed by the Israel Defense Forces on 16 January 2009 during the 2008–2009 Israel–Gaza conflict. A son, Amer Shurrab, attended Middlebury College in Vermont, United States and is a member of Seeds of Peace, an international conflict resolution organization based in the United States. Muhammad Shurrab (64) was injured and his two of his sons, Kassab Shurrab (27) and Ibrahim Shurrab (17) were killed during a "lull" in the fighting. A service was held at Middlebury on 29 January for the Shurrab family. The family's story was told on the floor of the United States Senate by Vermont Senator Patrick Leahy.

Amer Shurrab appeared on Democracy Now! on July 27, 2014 to discuss the death of family members in 2009 and cousins in 2014.
