= Doc Films =

Doc Films, formerly the Documentary Film Group, is a student-operated film society at the University of Chicago. According to a 2007 Chicago Tribune article, it is "the longest-running collegiate film society in the country" and may be the oldest film society of any kind in the United States. Formed in 1932 as a group of students who gathered to screen documentary films, it officially adopted the name International House Documentary Film Group in 1940. It has since expanded both the genres it screens and the activities it sponsors.

== History ==
Doc Films began in 1932 as the Documentary Film Group, as the students involved collected money to pay for documentaries they would screen. In 1940, it officially became the International House Documentary Film Group.

== Activities ==
As the student organizers realized that they could not sustain the organization on documentaries alone, they expanded to incorporate fictional and experimental films. While the University's classes are in session, Doc Films hosts nightly screenings of films selected from one of these categories at Max Palevsky Cinema, located in Ida Noyes Hall. Doc's screening selection is eclectic. Each quarter of the academic year, students and members of the public propose series of nine films that are somehow related to each other (filmmaker, actor, language, genre, era, theme, etc.). The Programming Committee, which consists of any interested students or members of the public, then chooses among these proposals to schedule a different series for each weeknight (Sunday through Friday). Recent films, normally delayed one quarter from their nationwide release date, are shown on weekends. Occasionally, Doc screens films which have not yet been released to the general public in the area, including The Rules of the Game and Brokeback Mountain. The daily operations of the theater are also completely run by volunteers, either students or interested members of the community. These volunteers create promotional materials, sell and collect tickets, present films, and project the films.

Other events include showings of student films and conversations with faculty and professionals connected to the film industry. It has hosted a number of film directors, including Alfred Hitchcock, Woody Allen and John Ford.
