= University of Chicago Scavenger Hunt =

Annual scavenger hunt held at the University of Chicago

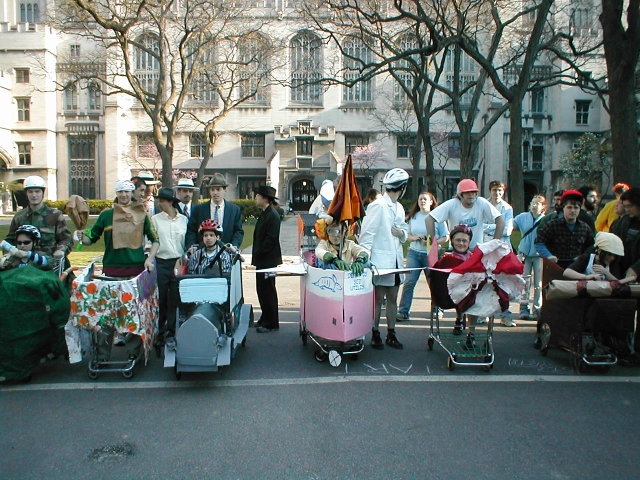
Qwazy Quad Rally, Scav Hunt 2005, item #38.

The University of Chicago Scavenger Hunt (or Scav Hunt, colloquially Scav) is an annual four-day team-based scavenger hunt held at the University of Chicago from Thursday to Sunday of a week in May, typically ending on Mother's Day. The list of items, usually over 300 items long, encompasses cryptograms, competitions, build challenges, a 3-course meal, and, before 2020, a 1,000-mile (1,600 km) road trip. "Scav Hunt" is well known for its quirky, strange, and impossible items. Scav held the Guinness World Record for largest scavenger hunt from 2011 to 2014.

== History ==
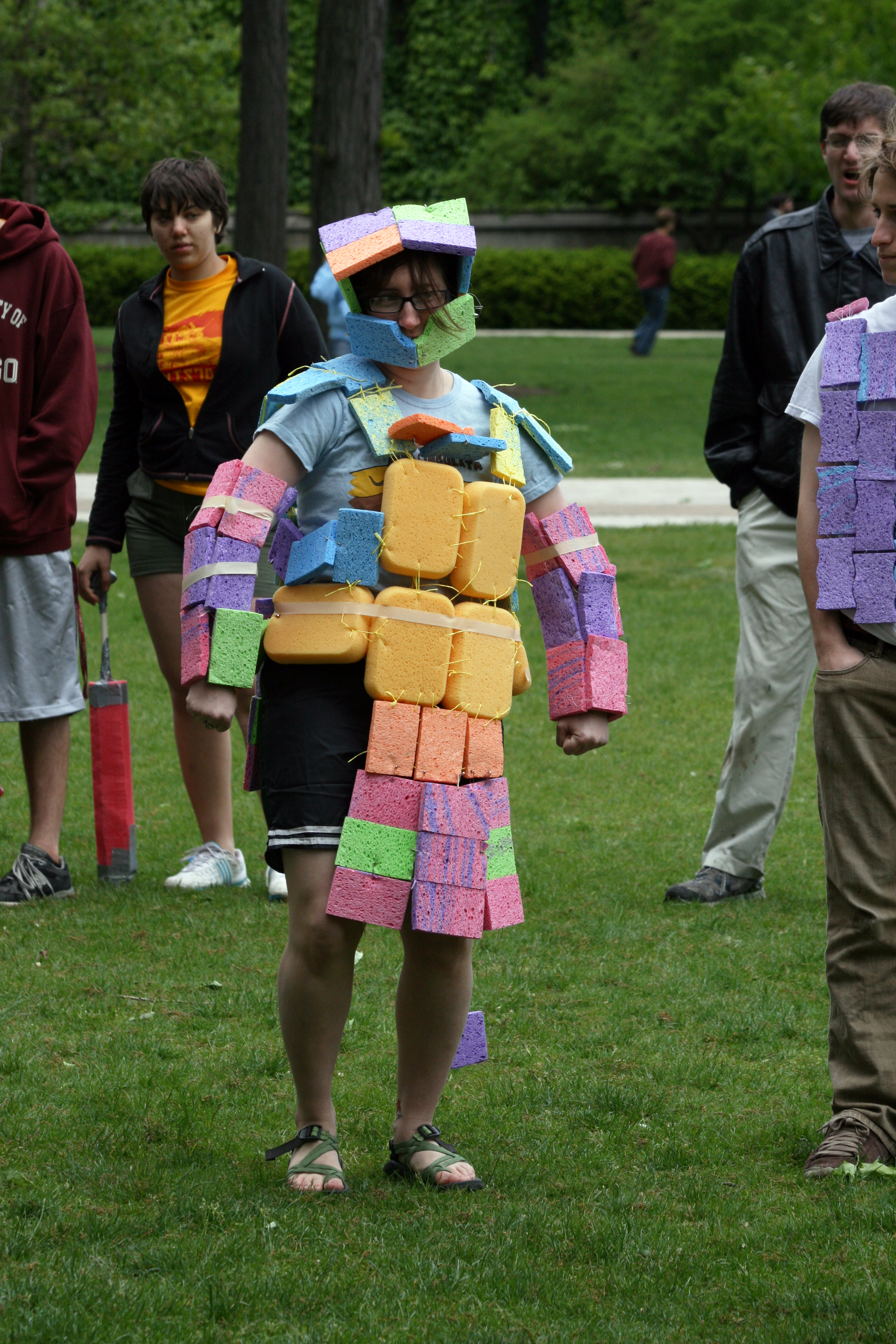
A Scav participant wearing a suit of armor made of sponges during the 2010 hunt

Scav Hunt was founded in 1987 by Chris Straus, who organized the list and judged items collected by other residents of Hitchcock house, with Cassie Scharff, Diane Kelly, Rick Jeffries, and Nolan McCarty.

Perhaps the most notable item that has yet been completed was from the 1999 list; a breeder reactor in a shed was successfully built in front of Ida Noyes Hall. The item itself was a joke referring to the "Radioactive Boy Scout" David Hahn. The students irradiated thorium with thermal neutrons and observed traces of uranium and plutonium.

In 2002, Scav Hunt was the subject of a documentary titled The Hunt. The 2007 Scav Hunt was also the subject of a documentary, Scavengers.

The Scav Hunt formerly held the Guinness World Record for largest scavenger hunt. To obtain the record, the Judges organized a miniature scavenger hunt during the 2011 Hunt. The smaller event was required to match the rules of the previous Guinness World Record-holding scavenger hunt. The Scav Hunt has since been officially surpassed for the title of the world's largest scavenger hunt by "Passport to Provo," an event organized by Provo and Google.

Due to the COVID-19 pandemic, the 2020 and 2021 Hunts were held virtually.

== Format ==
The Scavenger Hunt is held annually over four days in May, such that the final day's judgement of items is on Mother's Day.

=== List release ===
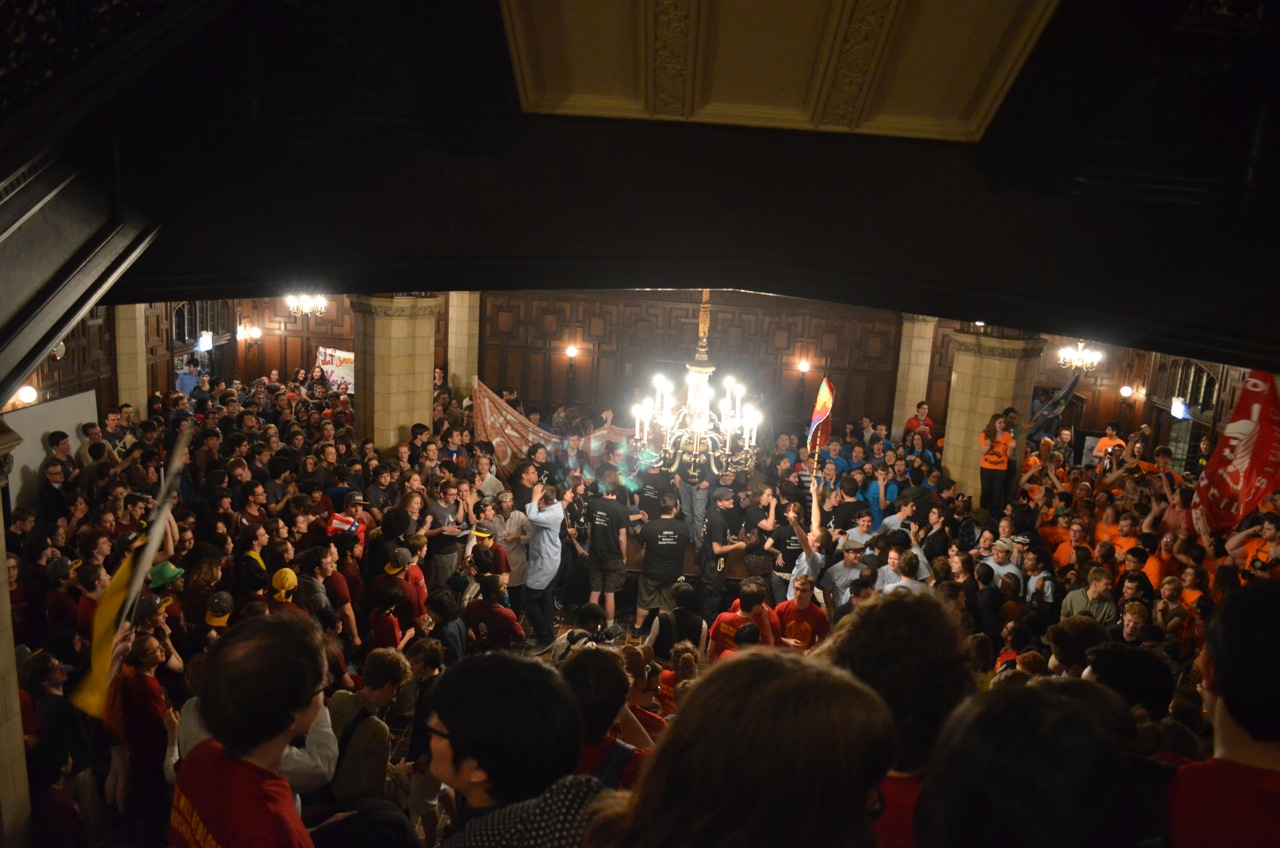
The first floor of Ida Noyes Hall minutes before the release of the 2014 (1) Scav Hunt List (in 2013).

"The Hunt" begins ceremoniously at midnight of the Wednesday preceding Mother's Day weekend, with an event known as "List Release." The ceremony surrounding the unveiling of the list usually begins a few hours before midnight, as teams slowly assemble on the ground floor of Ida Noyes Hall. These teams (ranging in size from 1 to over 250) then participate in what has been described as collective effervescence, as they chant various team-based and humorous slogans, eventually coalescing into a repeated "we want the list". Then, at midnight, the judges (members of the University of Chicago Scavenger Hunt Organizing Committee) run into the center of this gathering, and announce that year's list release challenge.

Each challenge is designed to delay teams in acquiring a paper copy of that year's list of approximately 300 items. Previous examples have included the pages of the list buried under sand at a nearby beach, team captains kidnapped and forced to transcribe items onto their bodies with Sharpies, and copies of the list suspended from a wall six feet high ten feet away from a team representative, because "the floor is lava." Once a team has obtained the list, they travel back to their headquarters (usually a dorm lounge or apartment living room) to begin working on the list of items. Several hours after the release of the list the judges publish it online (usually around 3:00 A.M. CDT on the Thursday of the Hunt), thus making it available for teams unable to attend "List Release."

=== The List ===
Every year, teams attempt to complete items from a list of approximately 300. Each item is written, assigned a point value, and put onto the list by a panel of judges known as the University of Chicago Scavenger Hunt Organizing Committee. The list has, since 1997, been formatted in LaTeX and released online in PDF and the original LaTeX formats at 3:00 A.M. CDT on the Thursday of the Hunt.

Since 2006, the list has begun with a set of official rules, including:

1. "Acquisition of Items. All items on the List can be obtained and performed legally. It may involve smooth talking, or it may involve something else, but it is all possible. The Judges take no responsibility for your getting thrown into the clink—be it local clink, state clink, federal clink, or Colonel Klink. If you end up there, it is your fault."
  - This rule is said to have been put in place as a response to the 1999 item to build a nuclear breeder reactor which had legal repercussions.
4. "Props. All props must, always and forever, be mad props."
7. "A Good Time. For a good time, call (202) 762-1401."
  - The phone number above is for the voice announcer of the United States Naval Observatory's "Master Clock," which provides time measurements at the atomic level of precision to the GPS satellite constellation run by the U.S. Air Force.

The road trip was discontinued in 2020, but in previous years' lists, after the official rules, the qualifying factors for the road trip portion of the scavenger hunt were included. These qualifying factors had been included in the list at the behest of UChicago's Center for Leadership and Involvement (the governing body for registered student organizations) since 2006. The road trip, itself, though, had been a part of the Hunt since 1991.

After the road trip qualifications, all "Scav Olympics" events are listed. These are original competitions designed annually and held on Eckhart Quad Saturday afternoon of the Hunt. In 2015, for each event, 1st, 2nd, and 3rd place were worth 20, 15, and 10 points respectively, while 5 points were awarded to "(3 < x ≤ ∞)th place." After the list of "Scav Olympics" events, there are occasionally special lists, such as wedding-associated items in 2015, and "Scav All-Stars" items from 2004 to 2006.

Finally, following the above sections, is the list of all general category items. Item lists are broken up into pages, with one or several judges contributing to the items on each page.

Archive of Previous Scav Lists
| Year | List | Other Documents |
|---|---|---|
| 1987 | https://scavhunt.uchicago.edu/assets/lists/1987.pdf | |
| 1988 | https://scavhunt.uchicago.edu/assets/lists/1988.pdf | |
| 1989 | https://scavhunt.uchicago.edu/assets/lists/1989.pdf | |
| 1990 | https://scavhunt.uchicago.edu/assets/lists/1990.pdf | |
| 1991 | https://scavhunt.uchicago.edu/assets/lists/1991.pdf | |
| 1992 | https://scavhunt.uchicago.edu/assets/lists/1992.pdf | |
| 1993 | https://scavhunt.uchicago.edu/assets/lists/1993.pdf | |
| 1994 | https://scavhunt.uchicago.edu/assets/lists/1994.pdf | |
| 1995 | https://scavhunt.uchicago.edu/assets/lists/1995.pdf | |
| 1996 | https://scavhunt.uchicago.edu/assets/lists/1996.pdf | |
| 1997 | https://scavhunt.uchicago.edu/assets/lists/1997.pdf | |
| 1998 | https://scavhunt.uchicago.edu/assets/lists/1998.pdf | |
| 1999 | https://scavhunt.uchicago.edu/assets/lists/1999.pdf | |
| 2000 | https://scavhunt.uchicago.edu/assets/lists/2000.pdf | |
| 2001 | https://scavhunt.uchicago.edu/assets/lists/2001.pdf | |
| 2002 | https://scavhunt.uchicago.edu/assets/lists/2002.pdf | https://scavhunt.uchicago.edu/assets/lists/2002-Abductees.pdf |
| 2003 | https://scavhunt.uchicago.edu/assets/lists/2003.pdf | |
| 2004 | https://scavhunt.uchicago.edu/assets/lists/2004.pdf | |
| 2005 | https://scavhunt.uchicago.edu/assets/lists/2005.pdf | |
| 2006 | https://scavhunt.uchicago.edu/assets/lists/2006.pdf | |
| 2007 | https://scavhunt.uchicago.edu/assets/lists/2007.pdf | |
| 2008 | https://scavhunt.uchicago.edu/assets/lists/2008.pdf | https://scavhunt.uchicago.edu/assets/lists/VegasBaby.pdf |
| 2009 | https://scavhunt.uchicago.edu/assets/lists/2009.pdf | https://apps.wbez.org/blog/?p=3417 |
| 2010 | https://scavhunt.uchicago.edu/assets/lists/2010.pdf | |
| 2011 | https://scavhunt.uchicago.edu/assets/lists/2011.pdf | https://scavhunt.uchicago.edu/assets/GBWR/Rules.pdf https://scavhunt.uchicago.edu/assets/GBWR/KeyA.pdf https://scavhunt.uchicago.edu/sumter/ |
| 2012 | https://scavhunt.uchicago.edu/assets/lists/2012.pdf | |
| 2014 (1) | https://scavhunt.uchicago.edu/assets/lists/2014(1).pdf | |
| 2014 (2) | https://scavhunt.uchicago.edu/assets/lists/2014(2).pdf | |
| 2015 | https://scavhunt.uchicago.edu/assets/lists/2015.pdf | |
| 2016 | https://scavhunt.uchicago.edu/assets/lists/2016.pdf | |
| 2017 | https://scavhunt.uchicago.edu/assets/lists/2017.pdf | |
| 2018 | https://scavhunt.uchicago.edu/assets/lists/2018.pdf | |
| 2019 | https://scavhunt.uchicago.edu/assets/lists/2019.pdf | |
| 2020 | https://scavhunt.uchicago.edu/assets/lists/2020.pdf | |
| 2021 | https://scavhunt.uchicago.edu/assets/lists/2021.pdf | |
| 2014(0) | https://scavhunt.uchicago.edu/assets/lists/2014(0).pdf | |
| 2023 | https://scavhunt.uchicago.edu/assets/lists/2023.pdf | |
| 2024 | https://scavhunt.uchicago.edu/assets/lists/2024.pdf | |
| 2025 | https://scavhunt.uchicago.edu/assets/lists/2025.pdf | |
| 2026 | https://scavhunt.uchicago.edu/assets/lists/2026.pdf | |

=== Judges ===
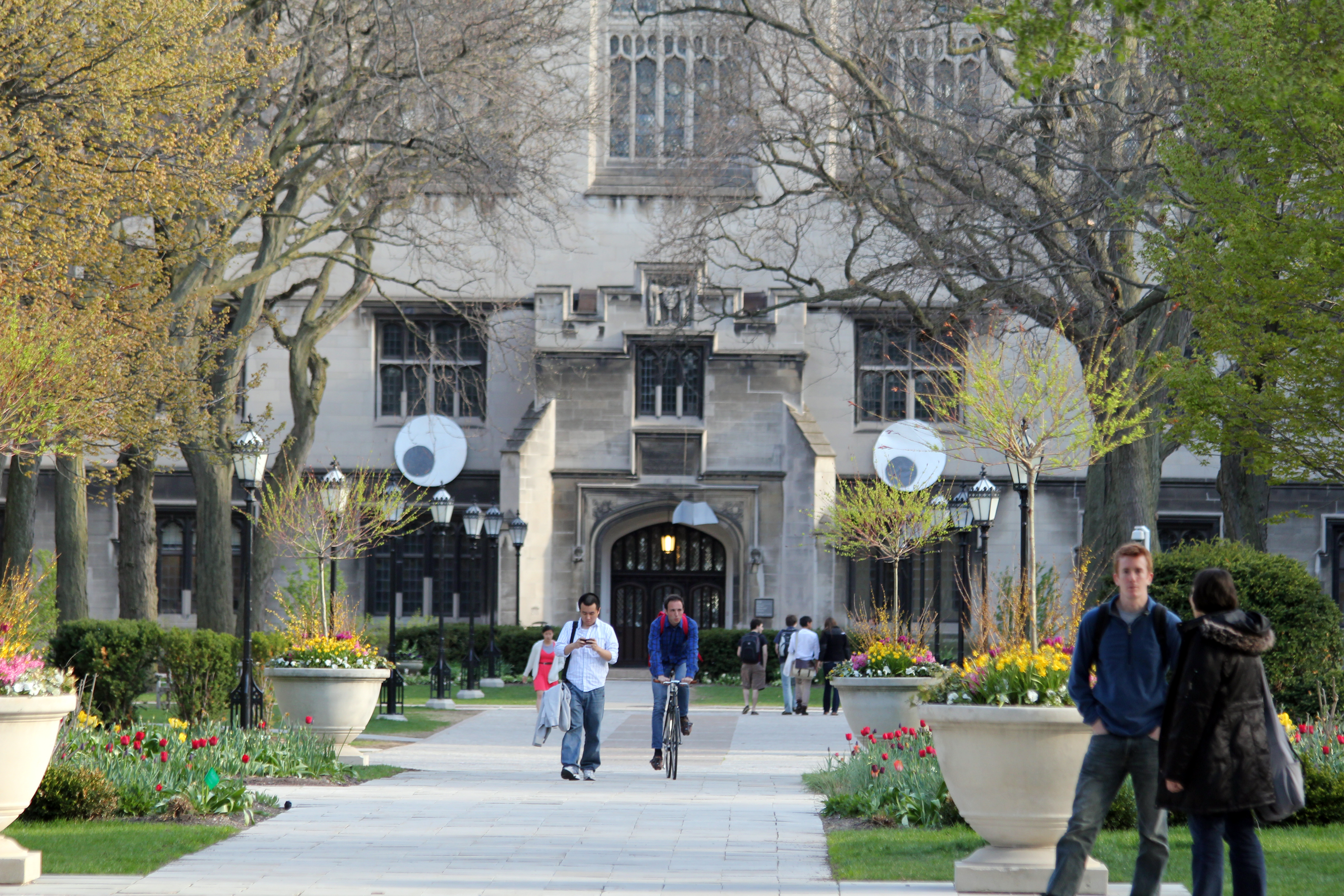
Enormous googly eyes attached to Harper Memorial Library during the 2011 hunt

The Scavenger Hunt committee is a registered student organization at the University of Chicago. The committee is made up of judges, those who make the list and determine item completion, and non-judges, who help with other administrative tasks. Judges are known as "Hot Side Hot" while non-judge members are known as "Cold Side Cold".

The list is compiled solely by the panel of judges, though the panel also organizes other aspects of the Scav Hunt. Judges begin compiling the list after the end of each Scav Hunt weekend, and continue to add items throughout the year. Members of the panel are sworn to secrecy on the contents of next year's list.

Any University of Chicago student with a GPA above 0.5 may apply to be a judge. Potential judges submit applications consisting of a questionnaire and a sample list of 30 items. Applicants are chosen to interview with the existing judges based on merit. New judges are often previous team captains or perennial participants of the Hunt. Actual methods of judge selection, however, are kept secret. Fragments of the sample lists of the newly chosen judges are often added to next year's list. Applications for new judges open at the beginning of October. New judges are selected by the end of the calendar year. Judges are appointed for life, but are required to maintain eligibility to join a student organization to remain active.

The head judge, known as the Scavenczar, is appointed at the end of the Scavenger Hunt each year. They oversee the planning and execution of the next Scav Hunt, until their successor is named.

== Items ==
Items on the list include codes and cypher, large scale construction and engineering projects, performances, unusual sports, and difficult to acquire objects. Some items require connections to accomplish such as: get your Scav team a shout out on the news, get a flag on the North Pole, or reach the lowest elevation possible (the winning elevation was reached in a submarine).

=== Showcase ===
Each year there are a handful of particularly large point items. There have typically been three showcase items per list in the recent past. These items are typically over 100 points each, but in the past it was not unusual for an individual item to be 500+ points. These items are judged in competition between the teams and points are awarded according to the ranking.

=== Road trip ===
Road trip, one of the more original elements of the hunt, was discontinued in 2020.

Before 2020, the road trip was constrained by several factors. The furthest destination could be no more than 1,000 miles (1,600 km) from Chicago, and the trip must have been completed between 8 a.m. Thursday morning and Saturday night. Additionally, the road trip was completed with participants wearing ridiculous costumes. Items for the road trip were scattered throughout the main list.

Drivers on the road trip were held to the following requirements:

- Minimum age of 18.
- Must have had a valid U.S. driver's license for at least two years.
- Must have more than 2,000 miles (3,200 km) driving experience.
- Cannot have received any moving violations or convictions or court-ordered supervision.
- Must be alcohol and drug free.
- Must have valid automobile insurance.

=== Friday night event ===
On the Friday Night of the Scavenger Hunt, there is usually a large themed event held in one of the gathering spaces on campus. In recent years, this event has been a wedding, a sleepover party with pillow and blanket forts, and a prom dance.

Previously, this event took the form of a large party held on the main quads attended by scavenger hunt participants and nonparticipants alike. Usually, this party involved a theme. Each team would design their own section of the party with drinks and attire adhering to this theme.

This long string of parties ended when, in 2006, during a particularly bad storm, the party was moved inside Cobb Hall. The theme that year was "visions of the future." ORCSA, the university administration body responsible for overseeing the Hunt, shut down the party due to intoxicated participants and alleged property damage.

=== Notable items ===
- "A periodic coffee table. (25 points plus 1 point per element included)"
- "A real live, breathing elephant. (500 points)"
- "A breeder reactor built in a shed, and the boy scout badge to prove credit was given where boy scout credit was due. (500 points)"
  - This was on the 1999 Scav list, and the item was successfully completed by Justin Kasper and Fred Niell, students on the Burton-Judson team. The team only came in second place that year.
- "A zeusaphone. (300 points)"
- "A Stradivarius violin, viola or cello. (90 points for a violin, 125 points for a cello, 150 points for a viola)"

== In popular culture ==
In 2002, Scav Hunt was the subject of a documentary titled The Hunt.

The 2007 Scav Hunt was also the subject of a documentary, Scavengers.

A docuseries following the 2025 hunt titled Scav, directed by Adam Chase and executive produced by Dave Wiskus and Sam Denby, premiered on Nebula on November 5, 2025.
