= Ida Noyes Hall =

University of Chicago building

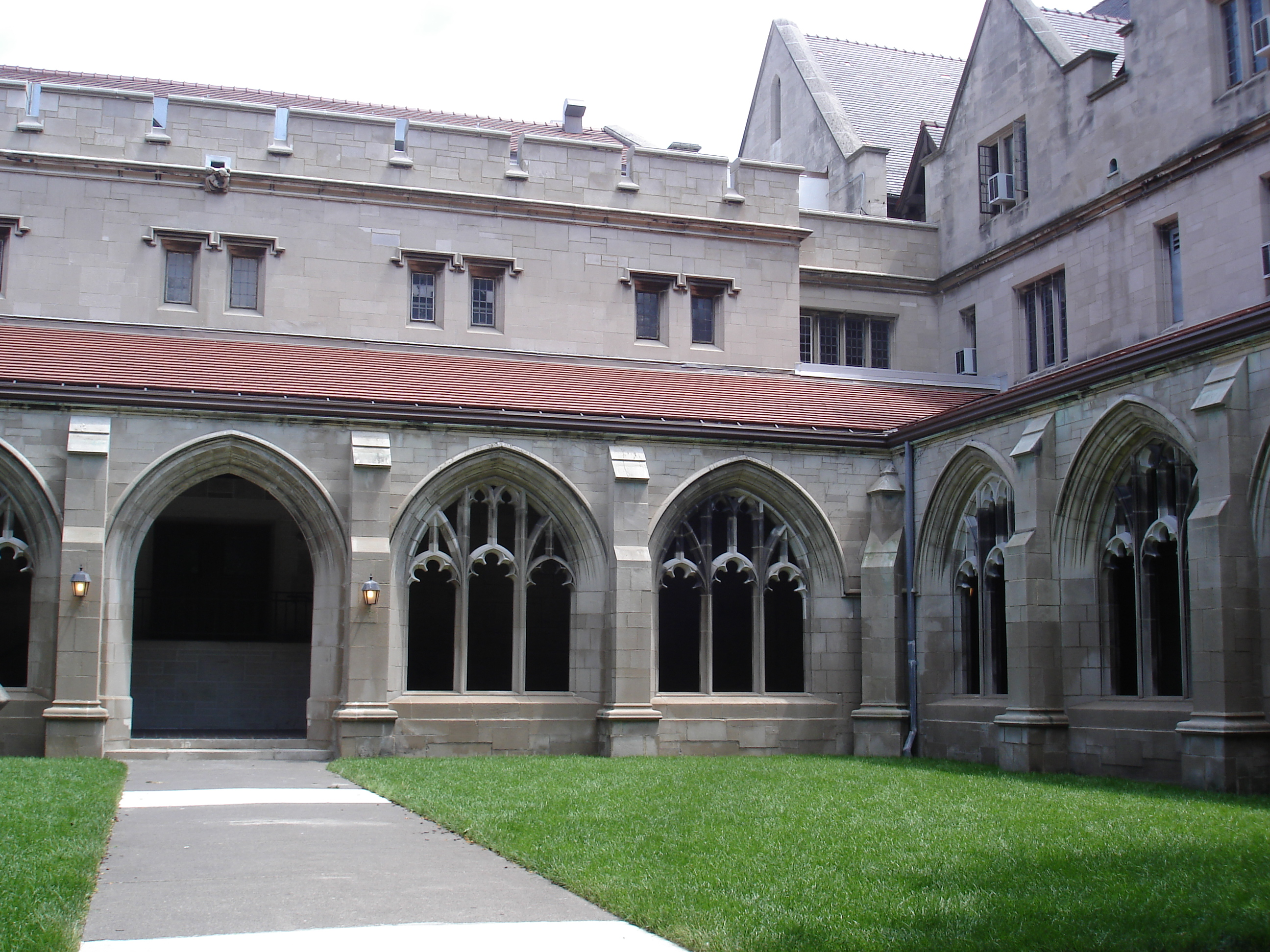
- Interactive map of the Ida Noyes Hall area

General information
- Type: College, Cinema, Theater
- Location: 1212 East 59th Street; Chicago, Illinois 60637; United States
- Coordinates: 41°47′17″N 87°35′44″W
- Completed: 1916

Design and construction
- Architect: Shepley, Rutan and Coolidge

Ida Noyes Hall is a three-story, Neo-Gothic building located on the University of Chicago campus in Chicago, Illinois. Designed by Shepley, Rutan and Coolidge and completed in 1916, the building features fireplaces, a limestone exterior, intricately plastered ceilings, and elaborate wood paneling.

The University of Chicago announced in March 2026 that a $50 million gift from David M. Rubenstein would modernize the building for students and visitors. All new architectural elements and the expanded set of activities and programs will be known as David M. Rubenstein Commons, while the existing building will continue to be named Ida Noyes Hall.

== History ==
Ida Noyes Hall originally served as a women's clubhouse and gymnasium, and was built as a complement to the Reynolds Club and Hutchinson Commons, which provided social and recreational spaces for the men on campus. The construction of the building was made possible by a gift from La Verne Noyes in the memory of his late wife, Ida. Ida Noyes, née Smith, was born in Croton, N.Y., in 1853, though her family relocated to Iowa in 1857. She graduated from Iowa State University with a degree in teaching in 1874 and married La Verne Noyes in 1877. Upon its opening, Ida Noyes Hall hosted public lectures, club meetings, and social events.

In January 2005 a portrait of Ida Noyes, painted by Oliver Dennett Grover and donated to the building by La Verne Noyes, was stolen from the building.

== Renovations ==
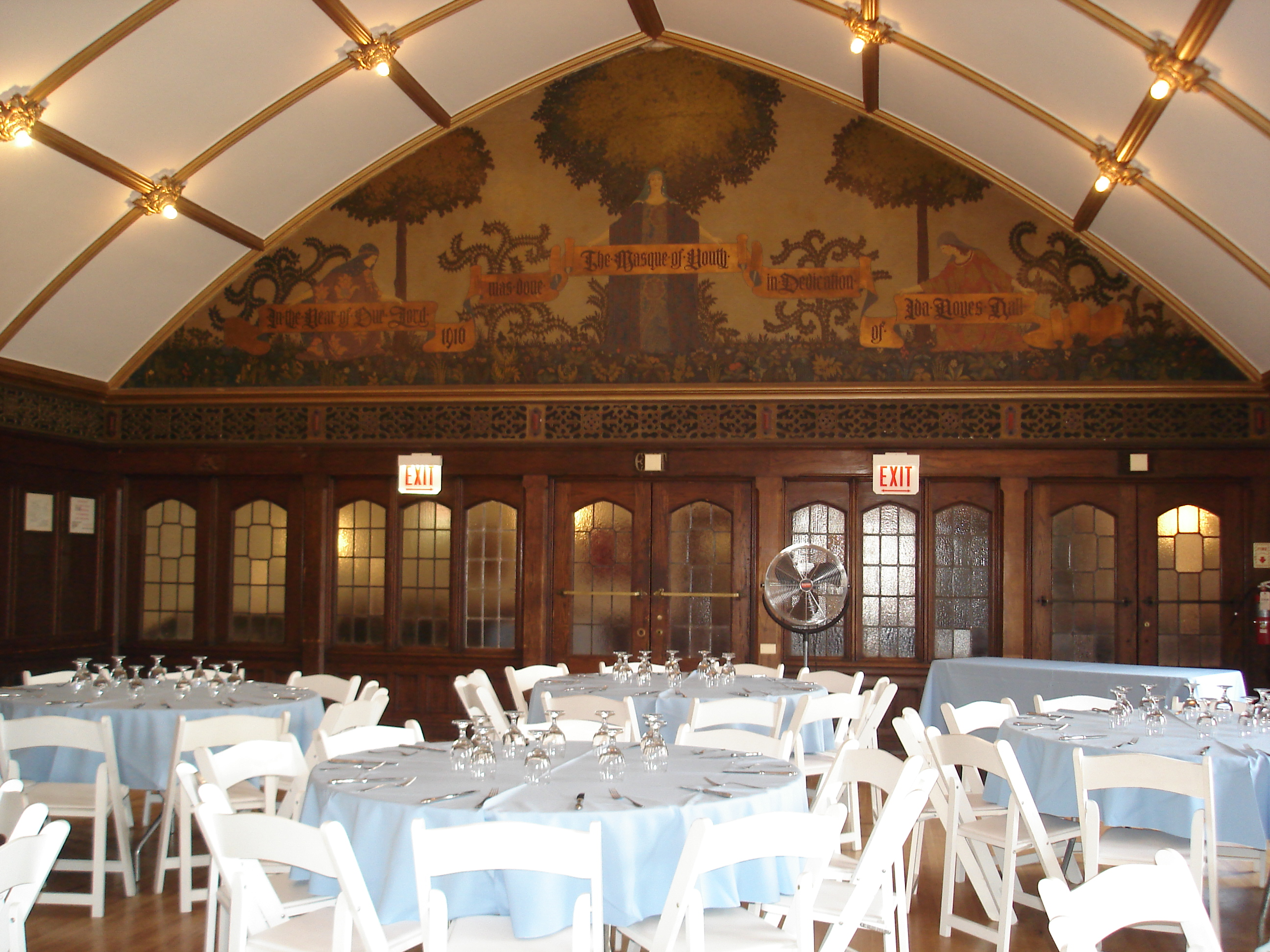
The Masque of Youth, restored in 1995

In 1987, the gymnasium was converted into Max Palevsky Cinema. Since that time, Doc Films has screened movies every night of the academic year. In 1995, the murals on the third floor, originally created in 1918 to commemorate the quarter centennial of the University of Chicago and the opening of Ida Noyes Hall, were restored. In 2007, the building underwent repairs to address a crumbling facade and leaking roof, and in 2008, the university's Booth School of Business renovated the natatorium to create additional study space for student study groups.

Currently, Ida Noyes Hall hosts student events, academic department events, corporate recruiting sessions, and private parties. It is home to the University of Chicago Pub and the Office of Career Advancement.

In March 2026 the university announced a $50M gift from David Rubenstein, "in recognition of his support, this revitalized hub for student life, campus activity, and welcoming destination for visitors will be named the David M. Rubenstein Commons. Plans for the building will ensure Rubenstein Commons honors the historic character and name of Ida Noyes Hall." The existing building will continue to be named Ida Noyes Hall.

== Notable events ==
- Opening celebration and quarter centennial of the University of Chicago (1916)
- Wedding reception of John D. Rockefeller IV and Sharon Percy Rockefeller (1967)
- Used as a filming location for The Express: The Ernie Davis Story (2007)
- The Chicago Hearing (2010)
- Traditionally, the final day of the University of Chicago Scavenger Hunt takes place in Ida Noyes Hall (annually)
- A $50 million gift from David M. Rubenstein, announced in March 2026, will modernize the building.

== See also ==
- Gothic Revival architecture
- University of Chicago
