= 2007 in China =

- Decades: 1980s; 1990s; 2000s; 2010s; 2020s
- See also: Other events of 2007; History of China • Timeline • Years

Events in the year 2007 in China.

== Incumbents ==
- General Secretary of the Chinese Communist Party - Hu Jintao
- President – Hu Jintao
- Premier – Wen Jiabao
- Vice President – Zeng Qinghong
- Vice Premier – Huang Ju to June 2, Wu Yi
- Congress Chairman - Wu Bangguo
- Conference Chairman - Jia Qinglin

=== Governors ===
- Governor of Anhui Province – Wang Jinshan then Wang Sanyun
- Governor of Fujian Province – Huang Xiaojing
- Governor of Gansu Province – Xu Shousheng
- Governor of Guangdong Province – Huang Huahua
- Governor of Guizhou Province – Lin Shusen
- Governor of Hainan Province – Wei Liucheng then Luo Baoming
- Governor of Hebei Province – Guo Gengmao (until April), Hu Chunhua (starting April)
- Governor of Heilongjiang Province – Zhang Zuoji (until December), Li Zhanshu (starting December)
- Governor of Henan Province – Li Chengyu
- Governor of Hubei Province – Luo Qingquan then Li Hongzhong
- Governor of Hunan Province – Zhou Qiang
- Governor of Jiangsu Province – Liang Baohua
- Governor of Jiangxi Province – Huang Zhiquan (until January), Wu Xinxiong (starting January)
- Governor of Jilin Province – Han Changfu
- Governor of Liaoning Province – Zhang Wenyue (until December), Chen Zhenggao (starting December)
- Governor of Qinghai Province – Song Xiuyan
- Governor of Shaanxi Province – Yuan Chunqing
- Governor of Shandong Province – Han Yuqun then Jiang Daming
- Governor of Shanxi Province – Yu Youjun (until September), Meng Xuenong (starting September)
- Governor of Sichuan Province – Zhang Zhongwei (until September), Jiang Jufeng (starting January)
- Governor of Yunnan Province – Qin Guangrong (starting January)
- Governor of Zhejiang Province – Lü Zushan

== Events ==
=== January ===
- January 1 – CITIC, a state-owned investment enterprise of the Chinese government, buys Nations Energy Company, a Canadian petroleum extraction company, giving it a majority stake in KazMunayGas, the state-owned oil and gas company in Kazakhstan, for US$1.91 billion. The deal is highly controversial because of the amount of control China now has over Kazakhstan's natural resources. Kazakh Oil Minister Baktykozha Izmukhambetov has criticized the deal since it was first considered in October 2006.
- January 11 – 2007 Chinese anti-satellite missile test: The Second Artillery Battalion of the People's Liberation Army of China tests a missile destroying one of its own satellites 535 miles above Earth.
- January 12 – China and Russia veto a United States drafted United Nations Security Council Resolution that would have urged the government of Myanmar to stop human rights abuses and the repression of political opposition.
- January 18 – The United States government reports that the People's Republic of China successfully tested a missile that destroyed an orbiting satellite of the Dong Fang Hong program.
- January 23 – Qiu Xiaohua, former head of the National Bureau of Statistics of China, is expelled from the Chinese Communist Party for corruption charges.

=== February ===
- February 16 – The G8 countries, plus China, Brazil, India, Mexico and South Africa, approve the 'Washington Declaration,' proposing a global Carbon emissions trading system to replace the Kyoto Protocol by 2009.
- February 27 – Drought in southwestern China is threatening the drinking water supply of 1.5 million people.
- February 28 – Strong wind blows a passenger train off the tracks near Turpan, Xinjiang, China, killing four and injuring 30 more.

=== March ===
- March 1 – A human case of bird flu is confirmed in China.
- March 7 – The People's Republic of China announces that its first probe to the Moon, Chang'e 1, will be launched later in 2007, with the eventual goal of landing a man on the moon by 2022. The probe is supposed to orbit the Moon at least three times.
- March 10 – Twenty people die and 9 are missing after a flood in a coal mine in Fushun, a city near Shenyang in the province of Liaoning in China.
- March 16 – The Property Law of the People's Republic of China is adopted at the 2007 National People's Congress.
- March 18 – A gas explosion in a coal mine in Shanxi province in northern China traps 21 miners.
- March 18 – Two cargo ships collide in the East China Sea. 23 crew members are missing.
- March 30 – The United States Food and Drug Administration identifies the chemical melamine in tainted wheat-gluten shipped from China and used by Menu Foods and an unnamed second company to manufacture pet food.

=== April ===
- April 12 – Premier of China Wen Jiabao urges Japan to admit to their actions in World War II during a landmark address to the Diet of Japan.
- April 16 – At least 33 coal miners are trapped in a mine in Baofeng County, Henan province, China.
- April 16 – The largest bank robbery in Chinese history is uncovered, when managers of the Agricultural Bank of China discover nearly 51 million yuan (c. US$6.7 million) is missing from the vaults of the Handan branch.
- April 18 – The People's Republic of China begins a new service of high-speed trains capable of reaching speeds of 200 km/h (124 mph).
- April 18 – Thirty-two steel workers are killed and two more injured in China after a ladle full of liquid steel failed, engulfing an adjacent room full of workers.
- April 20 – India and the People's Republic of China resume talks to resolve border disputes.

=== May ===
- May 4 – International delegates reach agreement at the Intergovernmental Panel on Climate Change on the summary report on mitigating climate change despite some concerns raised by China.
- May 7 - 2007 Chinese slave scandal: A local television station first reported on missing children kidnapped to work as slaves at brickyards in Shanxi.
- May 13 – Two cargo ships collide in heavy fog near Dalian, China. 16 sailors are missing.
- May 18 – Rioting breaks out in Guangxi province, China, in protest at the government imposing fines for breaches of its strict one-child policy.
- May 26 – At least 21 people die in western China in landslides caused by heavy rain.
- May 29 – Zheng Xiaoyu, former head of China's State Food and Drug Administration, is sentenced to death for taking bribes to approve untested medicines as Chinese authorities introduce a recall system for unsafe food products.

=== June ===
- June 3 – A 6.4 magnitude earthquake strikes southern China near the Myanmar and Laos borders causing casualties.
- June 4 – China publishes its first National Action Plan on Climate Change, expected to cut national carbon emissions by up to 1.5 million metric tons annually by 2010.
- June 6 – Dozens of people are trapped in a collapsed hall in Leshan in the southwestern province of Sichuan in China.
- June 8 – Chinese police rescue 31 workers kept as slaves at a brickworks in Linfen in Shanxi province run by the son of a local official of the Chinese Communist Party.
- June 28 – UNESCO designates 22 new World Heritage Sites, including the fortified multi-storey tower houses of Guangdong Province in the People's Republic of China.
- June 30 – Hong Kong celebrates the tenth anniversary of the handover from the United Kingdom to the People's Republic of China.

=== July ===
- July 4 – A tornado kills 14 people and injures at least 146 near Tianchang, Anhui Province, in eastern China.
- July 5 – Twenty-five people died and 33 are injured in an explosion in a karaoke bar in Tianshifu in northeast China. An investigation conducted the next day concludes that the explosion was caused by improperly stored explosives.
- July 7 – Over 800 landslides occurred following heavy rains in eastern Sichuan, leaving thousands of villagers in Daxian homeless.
- July 10 – China executes the former head of the State Food and Drug Association Zheng Xiaoyu for corruption.
- July 16 – China punishes 95 officials for allowing workers and children to labour in slave-like conditions in brick kilns.
- July 18 – the city of Chongqing is hit with the largest rainstorm in the city's meteorological records, killing 32. 12 people are reported missing.
- July 20 – China shuts down a chemical plant associated with deaths in Panama from tainted medicine and two petfood plants associated with the deaths of pets in the United States.
- July 22 – More than 100 people die in floods and landslides in China.
- July 30 – Sixty-nine miners are trapped in a flooded coal mine in Henan province in central China.

Date unknown

- Storm Online – a free-to-play 2.5D fantasy role playing game is first released in China.

=== August ===
- August 3 - The State Administration for Religious Affairs issued State Religious Affairs Bureau Order No. 5, which required tulkus who planned to be reincarnated to submit an application to the government.
- August 5 – Thirty-four rail workers building a tunnel in Hubei province China are trapped 200 metres underground following a landslide.
- August 8 – China's Inner Mongolia Autonomous Region celebrates its 60th anniversary. Chinese Vice-President Zeng Qinghong visits its capital, Hohhot, and participates in a series of large celebration events.
- August 9 – China temporarily bans exports from two toy manufacturers whose products were banned or recalled in the United States and other countries.
- August 13 – Flooding caused by Tropical Storm Pabuk causes widespread flooding in Guangdong Province in southern China affecting up to 1.2 million people.
- August 14 – A bridge under construction completely collapses in Fenghuang County, Hunan Province, China, killing at least 47 people. 21 workers are injured, 13 are still missing.
- August 14 – Mattel recalls over 18 million toys made in China that may potentially be harmful to children.
- August 14 – China establishes a minimum living standard system to cover all rural residents in 2007. The system is designed to pull poor villagers out of poverty.
- August 17 – 172 coal miners are trapped in a flooded mine in Shandong province in eastern China.
- August 17 – 2007 Pacific typhoon season: Southeast China and Taiwan prepare for typhoon Sepat.
- August 19 – Typhoon Sepat spawns a tornado that kills nine people in Zhejiang Province, China. More than a million people have been evacuated as a result of the typhoon.
- August 20 – A China Airlines Boeing 737 airplane explodes less than a minute after all passengers and crew are evacuated shortly after landing at Naha, Japan.
- August 22 – Typhoon Sepat has killed at least 36 people in southeast China in the past week.

=== September ===
- September 1 – New laws come into effect giving China more control over the selection of the Dalai Lama.
- September 3 – Four cargo ships carrying methanol sink on the Hanjiang River, the source of the water supply for Wuhan, China, with environmental authorities monitoring water quality.
- September 12 – Thousands of ex-soldiers are rioting in the People's Republic of China in the cities of Baotou, Wuhan, and Baoji, breaking into cars, destroying classrooms, and setting fires. The riot is the largest protest since the 1989 Tiananmen Square protest.
- September 18 – China confirms a bird flu outbreak in Guangzhou.
- September 18 – 2007 Pacific typhoon season: Hundreds of thousands of people are evacuated from Shanghai, China as Typhoon Wipha approaches.
- September 19 – Typhoon Wipha (Goring) makes landfall in eastern China before weakening to a Category 2 typhoon as it heads inland.

=== October ===
- October 2 – 27 people are killed when a bus catches fire in Chongqing, southwest China.
- October 6 – Typhoon Krosa later heads for the People's Republic of China, where 730,000 people are evacuated from Zhejiang and Fujian provinces.
- October 21 – A fire in an illegal shoe factory kills at least 34 people in Putian in Fujian province, China.
- October 21 – Three of the People's Republic of China's top politicians, namely, Vice-President Zeng Qinghong, anti-corruption chief Wu Guanzheng, and Luo Gan, are dropped from the Chinese Communist Party's Central Committee. Also retiring are Vice-Premier Wu Yi, Vice-Premier Zeng Peiyan, and Defence Minister Cao Gangchuan. Hu's Scientific Development Concept is enshrined in the Party Constitution.
- October 24 – China launches its first lunar orbiter, Chang'e 1, on an exploration mission to the moon.
- October 29 – The Chinese government announces that it has arrested 774 people as part of a crackdown on the production of tainted drugs, food and agricultural products.

=== November ===
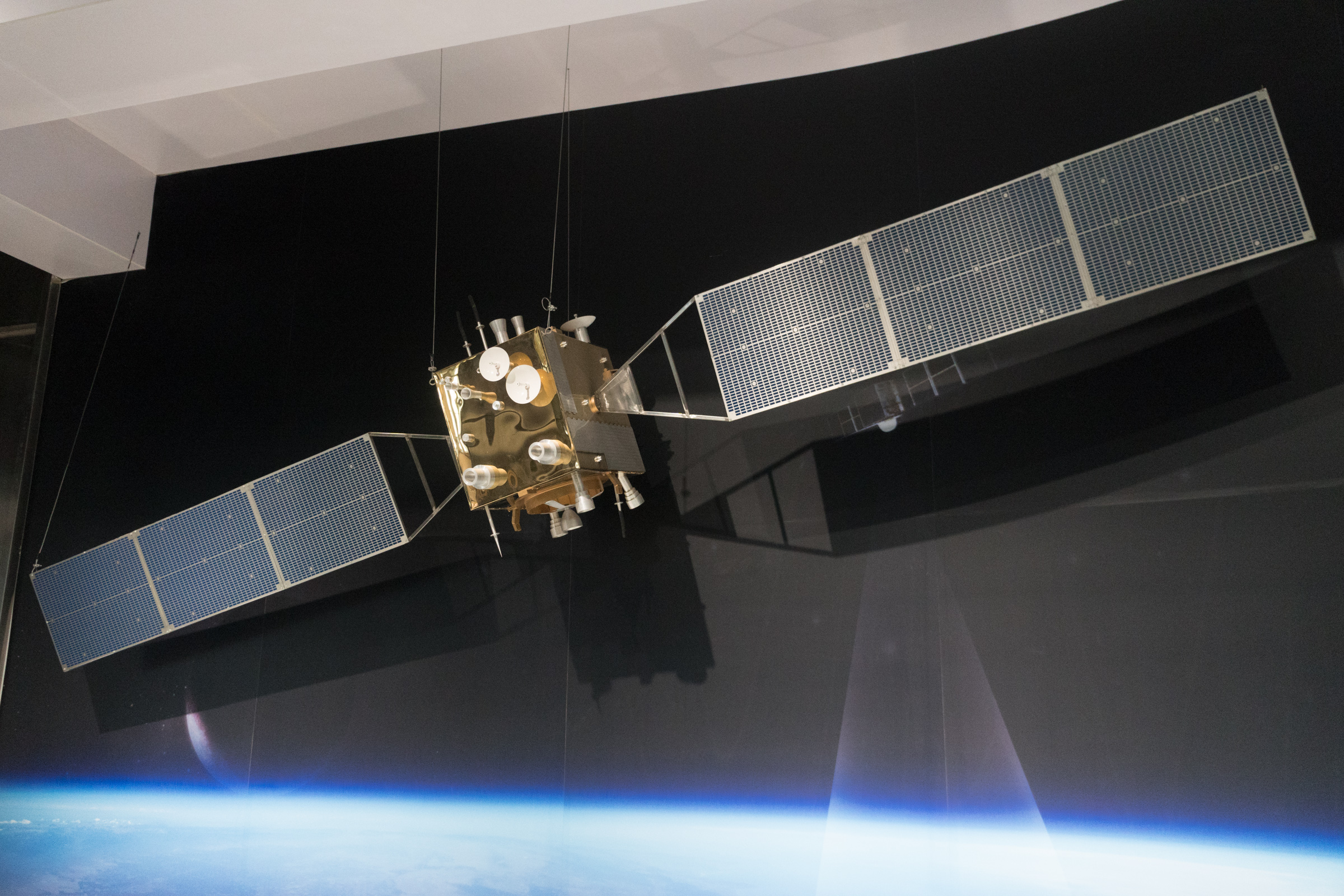
Chang'e 1 entered lunar orbit on 5 November 1997

- November 5 – Chang'e 1 entered lunar orbit.
- November 8 – At least 29 miners are killed in a gas leak in a colliery in China's Guizhou province.
- November 24 – An explosion at a petrol station kills four people and hurts at least 30 in Shanghai, China.

=== December ===
- December 6 – The death toll rises to 104 in a northern China coal mine gas blast.
- December 6 – France begins construction on the third unit of the Flamanville Nuclear Power Plant, which will be the world's second European Pressurized Reactor following a week after a record breaking deal with China for new nuclear power.
- December 8 – A second human case of H5N1 bird flu is confirmed in eastern China.

== Sports ==
- May 27 – China claims all gold and silver medals in the Table Tennis World Championships in Zagreb, Croatia.
- September 10 - September 30 - 2007 FIFA Women’s World Cup
- September 30 - October 2 - 2007 Euroleague Challenge in Kunshan.
- October 2 – 2007 Summer Special Olympics opens in Shanghai, China.

== Deaths ==
- January 5: Chih Ree Sun, 83, physicist and poet, kidney and lung cancer.
- January 15: Bo Yibo, 98, politician known for urging crackdown on Tiananmen Square protests of 1989.
- February 8: Ismail Semed, Muslim Uighur separatist, execution by firing squad.
- March 18: Jim Fung, 62, martial artist and businessman, nasopharyngeal carcinoma.
- March 23: Mao Anqing, 83, author and son of Mao Zedong.
- March 28: Cha Chi Ming, 93, Hong Kong businessman, founder and non-executive chairman of HKR International.
- April 20: Michael Fu Tieshan, 75, Patriotic Catholic Association bishop of Beijing, cancer.
- May 13: Chen Xiaoxu, 41, actress (Lin Daiyu in Dream of the Red Mansion), later becoming a Buddhist nun, breast cancer.
- May 25: Sun Yuanliang, 103, General with the Kuomintang, exiled in Taiwan.
- June 2: Huang Ju, 68, Vice Premier, Politburo Standing Committee member, former Mayor of Shanghai.
- June 9: Elias Wen, 110, Protopresbyter (senior clergy) of the Russian Orthodox Church.
- June 18: Tung Hua Lin, 96, engineer, designed China's first twin-engine aircraft, heart failure.
- June 23: Hou Yaowen, 59, xiangsheng (cross-talk) actor, heart attack.
- July 10: Zheng Xiaoyu, 62, official, former head of the State Food and Drug Administration, executed.
- July 17: Cheng Shifa, 86, painter, cartoonist and calligrapher.
- August 11: Zhang Shuhong, 50, company co-owner involved in Fisher-Price toy recall, suicide by hanging.
- September 5: Duan Yihe, 61, congress member who arranged the murder of his mistress, execution.
- September 9: Han Dingxiang, 71, Roman Catholic archbishop detained for loyalty to the Vatican.
- October 4: Chen Chi-li, 64, gangster, killer of dissident journalist Henry Liu, pancreatic cancer.
- October 7: Sisi Chen, 68, actress, pancreatic cancer.
- October 23: Lim Goh Tong, 90, billionaire, founder of the Genting Group.
- October 28: Bao Zunxin, 70, intellectual and jailed Tiananmen Square democracy activist, brain hemorrhage.
- November 12: Ying Hope, 84, politician.
- December 11: Nicholas Kao Se Tseien, 110, supercentenarian, world's oldest Catholic priest.
- December 21: Ken Lee, 75, owner and co-founder of Bing Lee superstores, cancer.
- December 28: Sun Daolin, 86, actor.

== See also ==
- List of Chinese films of 2007
- Chinese Super League 2007
- Hong Kong League Cup 2007–08
