= Aloft Hotels =

Hotel chain based in North America

- Company type: Franchise
- Industry: Hospitality
- Founded: 2005
- Founder: W Hotels
- Number of locations: 240 (2025)
- Area served: Worldwide
- Owner: Marriott International
- Parent: Marriott International
- Website: aloft-hotels.marriott.com

Aloft Hotels is an American hotel chain based in North America, owned by Marriott International. The first hotel opened at the Trudeau International Airport in Montreal in 2008. Aloft Hotels have since opened across North America and internationally. Most Aloft hotels are located in city centers or in close proximity to airports. As of April 9, 2023, the chain had 233 hotels.

The brand is most notable for its modern architecture design style. Another characteristic of Aloft hotels is the naming of basic hotel amenities. For example, in each hotel, the swimming pool is referred to as "splash".

== History ==
Aloft Hotels was conceived in 2005 by Amal Abdullah. The hotel chain already had several brands, including Sheraton, Westin, and W Hotels, but was looking to expand into a market of more contemporary hotels. To reflect its relationship with Starwood Hotels, the Aloft brand was dubbed "A Vision of W Hotels". Starwood worked with the architectural company Rockwell Group and its founder David Rockwell to come up with the design.

To generate interest in the brand before its 2008 opening, Starwood launched a virtual tour of the hotels using Second Life, which enables visitors to move through a typical Aloft Hotel and explore its aspects in detail. Starwood monitored statistics from the site, gauged public reception based upon visitors' opinions, and incorporated this information into the design of future Aloft Hotels. Aloft became part of Marriott International in 2016 when Marriott acquired Starwood.

== Accommodations ==
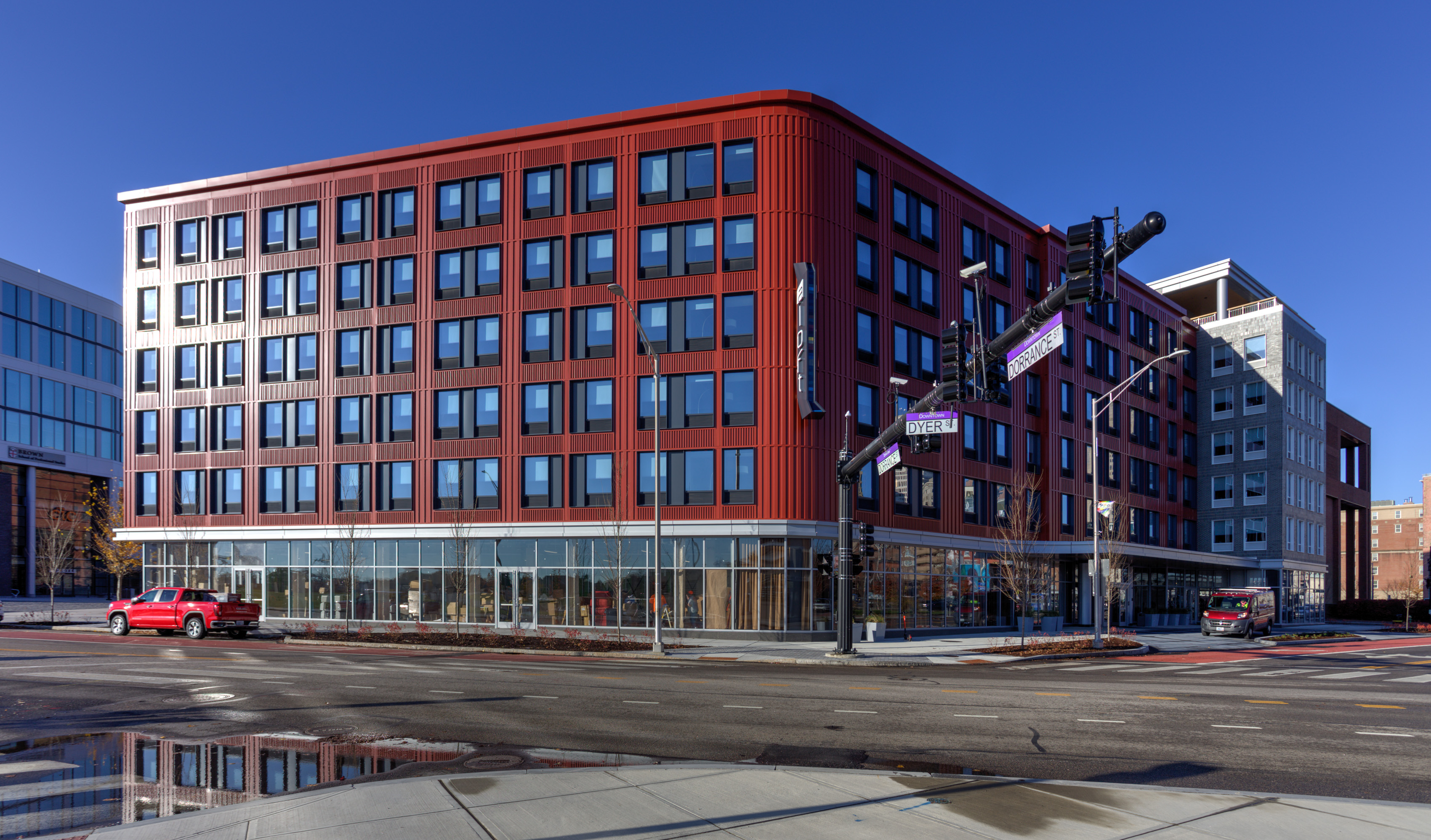
Aloft Hotel in Providence

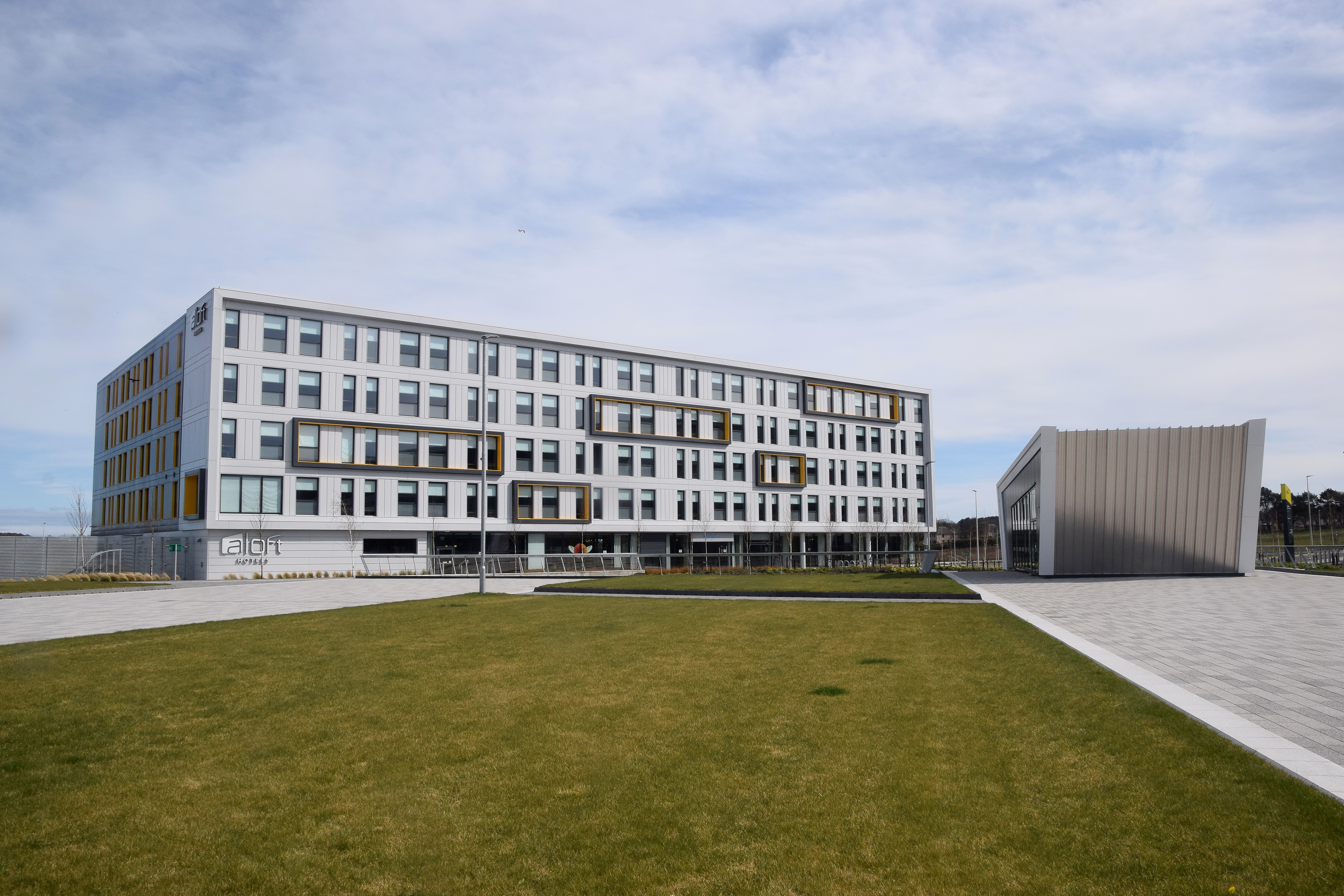
Aloft Hotel in Aberdeen

		North America	Europe	Middle E. & Africa	Asia & Pacific	Caribbean Latin Am.	Total
2016	Properties	81	6	3	20	6	116
2016	Rooms	12,096	1,000	956	4,629	1,034	19,715
2017	Properties	97	6	4	24	7	138
2017	Rooms	14,565	1,000	1,131	5,558	1,145	23,399
2018	Properties	108	7	8	27	9	159
2018	Rooms	16,296	1,310	2,012	6,240	1,494	27,352
2019	Properties	119	10	8	29	10	176
2019	Rooms	17,647	1,801	2,012	6,598	1,644	29,702
2020	Properties	134	10	8	30	10	192
2020	Rooms	19,619	1,614	2,006	6,732	1,679	31,650
2021	Properties	148	10	11	31	12	212
2021	Rooms	21,507	1,676	2,559	6,816	1,971	34,529
2022	Properties	156	10	11	31	14	222
2022	Rooms	22,582	1,676	2,555	6,790	2,313	35,916
2023	Properties	162	10	12	31	17	232
2023	Rooms	23,457	1,669	2,744	7,531	2,769	38,170

== Locations ==
Since its first hotel opened in 2008, the Aloft brand has grown rapidly. The hotel originally started in North America and expanded to include international locations. According to the Aloft website, in the United States there are current locations in 27 states. There are also open locations in Australia, Belgium, Canada, China, Colombia, Costa Rica, England, Germany, India, Malaysia, Mexico, Panama, Paraguay, Saudi Arabia, Singapore, South Korea, Taiwan, Thailand, Turkey, United Arab Emirates, Uruguay, and Nepal.

In 2011 and 2012, 20 proposed locations were to open, including in Mexico, Thailand, Colombia, and England, for a total of 66 Aloft locations. While positive for the hotel brand, this number was well short of an original anticipation to have 500 locations by 2012. In early 2013, the brand opened a 482-room property in Kuala Lumpur, Malaysia, making it the largest Aloft hotel in the world. The hotel includes a ballroom that can accommodate up to 1,000 people in a theatre setting. In 2013, the chain opened a new hotel at what is now the Oswald Tower in Cleveland, Ohio.

In September 2016, Aloft entered the Saudi Arabian market with a new hotel near the center of Riyadh. In December 2016, Aloft Long Island City-Manhattan View opened. In 2018, the new Mag Mile Hotel in Chicago, the largest with 435 rooms, updated the Aloft template, by integrating modern art, cutting-edge design, and floor-to-ceiling windows in the lobby.

In October 2023, Aloft announced plans for a new property near Fort Lauderdale–Hollywood International Airport and Port Everglades.

== Reception ==
Public reception of Aloft Hotels has been mixed. The majority of opinions revolve around the two main aspects of the hotel brand: room prices, and the contemporary style. One critic has decried that Aloft Hotels have too much of a "cookie cutter" feel and use colors, shapes, and lingo to an overwhelming degree.
