= Yu Lihua =

Chinese writer (1929–2020)

Yu Lihua 于梨華
- Yu Lihua in 1964
- Born: 28 November 1929; Ningbo, Zhejiang, Republic of China
- Died: 30 April 2020 (aged 90); Gaithersburg, Maryland, U.S.
- Education: National Taiwan University (BA); University of California, Los Angeles (MA)
- Occupation: Writer
- Spouse(s): Vincent O'Leary, Chih-Ree Sun
- Children: Lena Sun, Eugene Sun, Anna Sun
- Writing career
- Language: Mandarin Chinese
- Notable works: "又見棕櫚" (Again the Palm Trees) "梦回清河" (Dreaming of the Green River) "考验" (The Task)
- Notable awards: Samuel Goldwyn Writing Award, 1956; Ch'ia Hsin Literary Award, 1967

Chinese name
- Traditional Chinese: 于梨華
- Simplified Chinese: 于梨华
Transcriptions
Standard Mandarin
- Hanyu Pinyin: Yú Líhuá

Yu Lihua (Chinese: 于梨華, 28 November 1929 – 30 April 2020) was a Taiwanese writer who wrote over thirty works—including novels, short stories, newspaper articles and translations—over sixty years. She is regarded as "one of the five most influential Chinese-born women writers of the postwar era and the progenitor of the Chinese students' overseas genre." She wrote primarily in Chinese, drawing on her experience as a Chinese émigré in postwar America. She was celebrated in the diaspora for giving voice to what she called the "rootless generation"—émigrés who had left for a better life but remained nostalgic for their homeland.

She was more than a successful writer; she was a bridge, a cultural ambassador between China and the U.S. In 1975, she was one of the first individuals to be invited back to China after relations between the two countries were reopened. Her work, which until then had been blacklisted in China, began to focus on life in China. Through sponsorship of scholarly exchange programs, her column in China's People's Daily newspaper, and radio broadcasts on the Voice of America, she educated the American and Chinese public about life in each other's countries.

== Early life and education ==
Yu was born in Ningbo in 1929 and moved to Taiwan in 1948 during the Chinese Civil War. She attended National Taiwan University, where she graduated with a degree in history in 1953. That year, Yu emigrated to the United States and enrolled in the School of Journalism at the University of California at Los Angeles. In 1956, even though she failed UCLA's English proficiency exam and was turned away from their literature program, she won the Samuel Goldwyn Writing Award with her story "The Sorrow at the End of the Yangtze River." (杨子江头几多愁). She received her master's degree in history in 1956.

== Career ==
After UCLA, Yu wrote several pieces in English, which were all rejected by American publishers. Not to be stopped, she returned to writing in Chinese and began her long writing career in earnest. In 1967, her breakout novel, "Again the Palms" (又見棕櫚, 又見棕櫚) won Taiwan's prestigious Ch'ia Hsin Award for best novel of the year. She continued to write into her late eighties.

Yu taught Chinese language and literature at the University at Albany, State University of New York from 1968 to 1993. She continued her writing career throughout her time at SUNY. She was instrumental in starting exchange programs that brought many Chinese students to the campus.

In 2006, Yu received an honorary doctorate from Middlebury College.

== Personal life ==
Yu was married to physics professor Chih Ree Sun, with whom she had three children: daughters Lena Sun, Eugene Sun, and Anna Sun. After their divorce, Yu married University at Albany president Vincent O'Leary. After O'Leary's retirement, they moved to San Mateo in 1997 and to Gaithersburg, Maryland in 2006.

== Death ==
Yu died of respiratory failure brought on by COVID-19 in Gaithersburg, Maryland, on 30 April 2020, during the COVID-19 pandemic in Maryland.

== Bibliography ==
She authorizes over thirty novels, short stories, essays, and translations.

- 杨子江头几多愁/Yangzi jiang tou ji duo chou (The Sorrow at the End of the Yangtze River) 1956
- 夢回靑河/Meng hui qing he (Dreaming of the Green River) 1963
- 歸/Gui (Homecoming) 1963
- 也是秋天/Ye shi qiu tian (Autumn Again) 1963
- 变/Bian (Change), 1966
- 雪地上的星星/Xue di shang de xing xing, (Stars on a Snowy Night) 1966
- 又見棕櫚, 又見棕櫚 / You jian zong lü, you jian zong lü, (Again the Palm Trees) 1967
- 柳家莊上/ Liu jia zhuang shang, (In Liu Village) 1968 (also translated to English) 1968
- 燄/Yan (The Flame) 1969
- 白駒集 / Bai ju ji, (The White Colt) 1969
- 會場現行記 / Huichang xianxin ji, (When the Scholars Meet) 1972
- 考验/ Kao yan, (The Task) 1974
- 新中國的 女性／Xin zhong guo de nu xin, (Portraits of Seven Women in China) 1978
- 雖在西双版妠 /Sui zai xi shuang ban na, (Who is in Xi Shuang Ban Na) 1978
- 傅家的兒女們/ Fu jia de er nu men (The Fu Family) 1978
- 記得當年來水城 /Ji de dang nian lai shui cheng, (Remembering that Year in Buffalo) 1980
- 尋 / Xun, (The Search) 1986
- 相見欢／ Xian jian huan 1989
- 親盡／ Qin Jin, 1989
- 一個天使的沈淪/ Yi ge tianshi di chenglun, 1996
- 屏風後的女人/ Ping feng hou de nu ren (The Woman Behind the Partition) 1998
- 別西冷莊園/ Bie xiling zhuang yuan (Leaving Slingerlands), 2000
- 在离去和道別 之間／ Zai li qu he daobie zijian(Between Parting and Goodbye) 2002
- 飄零何處歸 /Piao ling he chu gui, 2008
- 彼岸/ Bi an, (The Other Shore) 2009
- 秋山又几种, Qiu Shan you ji zhong, 2009
- 小三子， 回家吧/Xiao sanzi, hui jia ba (Come Home Xin Mei) 2010
- 飄零何處歸
- 黄昏．廊裡的女人/ Huang hun lang li de nü ren (Two Women Reminiscing) 2015
- 花開有時/ Hua kai shi (A Time to Bloom) 2016
- 林曼/ Lin man, 2017
- 意想不到的結局, Yisi bu dao de jie ju (The Unexpected Ending) 2018
- 兒戲／Er xi (Children's Play) 2019

=== Collections ===
- 于梨華作品集 / Yu Lihua zuo pin ji, 1980

Translations:

English to Chinese

Flowering Judas and Other Stories by Katherine Ann Porter（《盛開的猶大花》凱塞琳．安．波得）

"A Roman Holiday," Edith Wharton（《羅馬假日》伊德絲華頓）

Edith Wharton（《伊德絲華頓其人》）

Chinese to English

"In Liu Village"（《柳家莊上》）Chinese Stories from TaiWan, Joseph Lau and Timothy Ross eds,1970

"Glass Marbles Scattered All over the Ground"（《撒了一地的玻璃球》）

An Anthology of Contemporary Chinese Literature II，

Nightfall（《暮》）譯者︰Vivian Hsu, Born of the Same Roots，
