= Rapex =

Rapex may refer to:

- Rapid Exchange of Information System, EU rapid alert system for dangerous consumer products
- RapeX, an anti-rape device
