= Haining Library =

Public library in Haining, Zhejiang, China

Chinese: 海宁市图书馆 transl. Haining Library

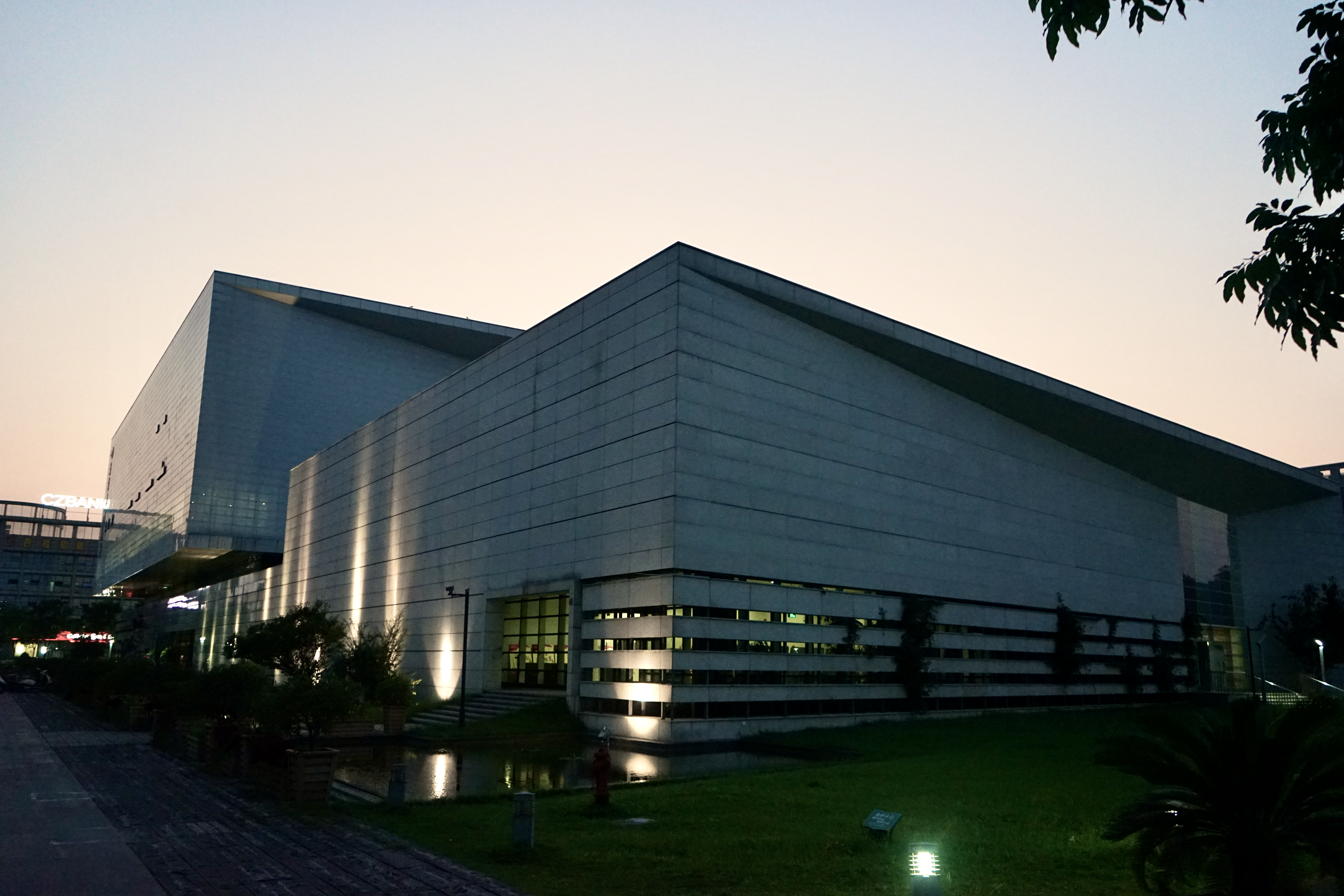
- Outline of the main building of the Library
- 30°30′30.78″N 120°40′31.40″E
- Location: 60-62 Xulin Street, Haining, Zhejiang, China, China
- Type: Public Library
- Established: 1904; 1958 (re-establishment)
- Reference to legal mandate: Law of the People's Republic of China on Public Libraries, and Chapter of Haining Library
- Branch of: Haining Municipal Bureau of Culture, Radio, Television, Tourism and Sport
- Branches: 11

Collection
- Size: over 1.7 million books (August 2018)

Access and use
- Access requirements: Haining Citizen Card, or Reader cards of any public library in Jiaxing
- Circulation: 4,930,618 (2017)
- Population served: 3,184,320 person-times (2017)

Other information
- Budget: 17,880,009 RMB (2016)
- Director: Wang Lixia (王丽霞)
- Employees: 28 government employees (2016)
- Website: www.hnlib.com

Haining Library (simplified Chinese: 海宁市图书馆; traditional Chinese: 海寧市圖書館; pinyin: Hǎiníngshì túshūguǎn; lit. 'Haining City Library'), or Haitu (海图), is a public library affiliated to Haining Municipal Bureau of Culture, Radio, Television, Tourism and Sport. The library is located in Haining, Jiaxing, Zhejiang, China, with a main building located in 60-62 Xuelin Street and 11 branches and tens of circulation points located in all the towns and sub-districts under Haining. As of August 2018, the library contains 1.7 million item. It is ranked as a National First Class Library by the Ministry of Culture and Tourism of China.

The Library's history dates back to 1904, when Haining Zhou Library (海宁州图书馆; 海寧州圖書館) was founded as the first county-level library to use the Chinese term "图书馆/圖書館" in China. On 30 June 1956, the Library was renamed as Haining County Library (海宁县图书馆; 海寧縣圖書館) in Chinese. After Haining was designated as a county-level city in February 1987, the Library was renamed as Haining City Library (海宁市图书馆; 海寧市圖書館). Haining Library was the first county-level public library in China and was known as one of the most beautiful basic-level libraries in China.

== History ==
=== Foundation and early development ===
The Library's history can date back to 1904, when Haining Zhou Library (海宁州图书馆; 海寧州圖書館) was founded as the first county-level library to use the Chinese term "图书馆/圖書館" in China. The establishment of the Library was proposed by eight of local scholar-gentry, including Zhu Ding (祝鼎) and Zhou Chengde (周承德), and was approved in the fourth month of that year in Chinese calendar. On its foundation, the Library was in Shuixian Pavilion (水仙阁; 水仙閣) which was the west wing of Haishen Temple (海神庙; 海神廟; 'Temple of Sea God') in Yanguan, the seat of Haining Zhou at that time. A chapter containing 44 articles defined the purposes of the Library, the rules for funding and book management. The fund of the Library was from the income of sharecropping and the donation to the temple. Yet, with the founders of the Library leaving Haining due to various reasons, a local called Zhu Baojin (朱宝瑨; 朱寶瑨) relocated the Library in the ground floor of a building next to the gate of Magong Temple (马公祠; 馬公祠) near the East Gate of Yanguan.

In 1915, Haining County Public Library (海宁县公立图书馆; 海寧縣公立圖書館) was founded, using the buildings of Haining Zhou Library, Old Academy (旧学宫; 舊學宮), Anlan Shuyuan (安澜书院; 安瀾書院). Zhu Zonglai (朱宗莱; 朱宗萊), who was educated in Japan, was appointed as the president of the Library by the county government, with a public fund of 200 Silver Yuan annually. The Library then set up a room for epigraphic collections. In 1918, the Library set up a department for collection of popular books whose themes included politics, literature and arts, technologies and techniques, etc. In 1930, the local government of Haining founded the Public Education Centre of Haining, and made the Library the Book Department of the centre. From August 1931 to August 1932, four libraries affiliated to the Public Education Centre were set up in four towns under Haining (Xiashi, Yuanhua, Chang'an, Xieqiao). In November 1931, Haining Public Library became independent from the centre, yet Bi Fuyun (宓福云; 宓福雲) remained president of both the Centre and the Library. After Japan occupied Haining in 1937, the Library ceased to operate.

=== Re-establishment after the war ===
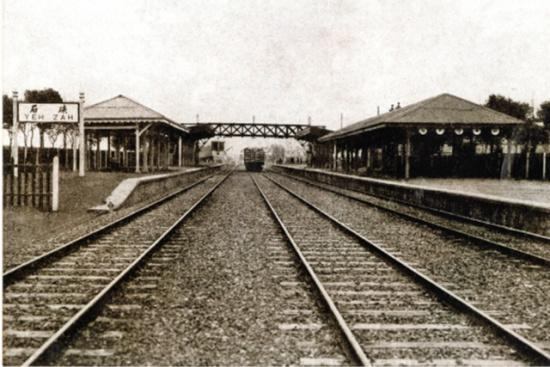
Xiashi Railway Station in 1920. The Library moved next to the station in 1963.

In 1947, the Public Education Centre was re-established in Xiashi, with an affiliated newspaper room. People's Liberation Army occupied Haining in May 1945. Haining Youth Club was founded, with a newspaper reading room as well. In March 1950, the Youth Club was replaced by the People's Culture Centre of Haining County (海宁县人民文化馆; 海寧縣人民文化館). In February 1953, the centre was renamed to the Culture Centre of Haining County (海宁县文化馆; 海寧縣文化館). On 9 May 1956, People's Committee of Haining County held a joint conference with the Youth League, workers' union, and other 11 groups, during which a committee in prepare for the establishment of a county library was resolved to be formed. On 30 June, Haining County Library was established and open to the public at Zhongning Alley (中宁小街; 中寧小街), Xiashi. Weng Gongyou (翁公友), the then president of the Culture Centre, was assigned as the president of both facilities. In January 1957, the Library set up a children's reading room. In April 1958, the Library was merged into the Culture Centre, the right to use the name of the Library was given to the centre. In the same month, Xiashi Library, a private library, was founded. Yet, Xiashi Library was renamed to the Library of Xiashi People's commune in October 1958, and was merged into Haining County Library in 1961.

=== During the Cultural Revolution ===
In November 1958, with Haiyan County merged into Haining County, the Library annexed the public libraries Haiyan. However, in 1961, the libraries became separated again when Haiyan re-gained countyhood. In 1962–63, the Library first moved to the ground floor of the building of the county broadcast station, and then it was settled down in Huili Temple (惠力寺), yet the room for preservation of ancient books remained unchanged. With the Cultural Revolution's outbreak in 1966, the checkout service was closed, although the reading room was still open to the public. The reading room was relocated to Xiaxi Street after the police division of the revolution headquarter occupied Huili Temple in 1967, and moved to Zhongning Alley in 1968. In 1969, the reading room was renamed to the Propaganda Station for Mao Zedong Thoughts in Haining County. In the winter of 1970, the Library moved to Huili Temple, again. On 27 January 1971, the Library reopened the book checkout service, distributing 1,000 reader cards. In 1974, Jinxing Building in back of Huili Temple was built as a new library building.

=== 1980s and 1990s ===
On 28 October 1982, the Planning and Economic Commission and Finance Office of Haining approved the construction of a 200-square-metre stack room with a budget of 20 thousand RMB for the Library but this was not carried out at that time. On 14 May 1984, Planning and Economic Commission approved the construction of a stack room and a reading room, with a total area of 933 square metres and a total budget of 97.9 thousand RMB, but this was not being done either. On 22 October 1984, the Library became a separate government agency and in November, it cancelled the number restriction on the distribution of reader cards. On 2 January 1985, Zhang Jingfu (张敬夫; 張敬夫) and Chen Boliang (陈伯良; 陳伯良), two members of local PCC, proposed that the Library should be constructed in a new site other than Zhongning Alley. The People's Government of Haining held a meeting, and resolved to acquire 7 mu of land and to build a library with a total building area of 3,000 square metres. On 6 June, the local Planning and Economic Commission approved this resolution, ratifying a budget of 700,000 RMB. The project started in October, carried out by Fengtu Construction Company of Haining. The construction of the building started on 25 December, yet was stopped due to technical problems of the foundation work.

In February 1987, Haining was designated as a county-level city. Haining County Library was renamed to Haining City Library. On 18 May 1988, the construction of the new library buildings was finished, for which a ceremony was held at the governmental guest house of Haining. The moving of the Library started on 23 January. The checkout service, newspaper rooms, and reference reading rooms became open to the public on 20 August. The moving ended up with an opening ceremony of the new buildings on 8 October, with the old building out of service. The new buildings cost 1.55 million RMB and had a floor area of 3229 square metres. The Library, covering an area of 8 mu, had a 4-storey main building containing a stack room with a mezzanine, and 2-storey subsidiary buildings. The buildings were encompassed by trees. Zhou Gucheng, Vice Chairman of NPC Standing Committee, and the calligrapher Sha Menghai inscribed the name of the Library as a calligraphic, which is still used in the logo of the Library now. On 23 March 1989, the Library set up the readers' service. On 23 May, the Library began to operate until late night after the improvement of the indoor illumination. In June 1991, the old buildings of the Library was recommended as an National Outstanding Cultural Facility by the Department of Culture of Zhejiang Province. On 28 August 1992, the Library set up a hall for speedy checkout. On 21 December 1994, the Library was ranked as National Civilized Library and National Class 1 Library by the Ministry of Culture. In May 1995, the Workers' Association of Haining Library was formed. In June 1999, a national engaging system was introduced to the employees of the Library. In June 1999, the weekly closing day of the Library was cancelled.

=== 2000s and 2010s ===
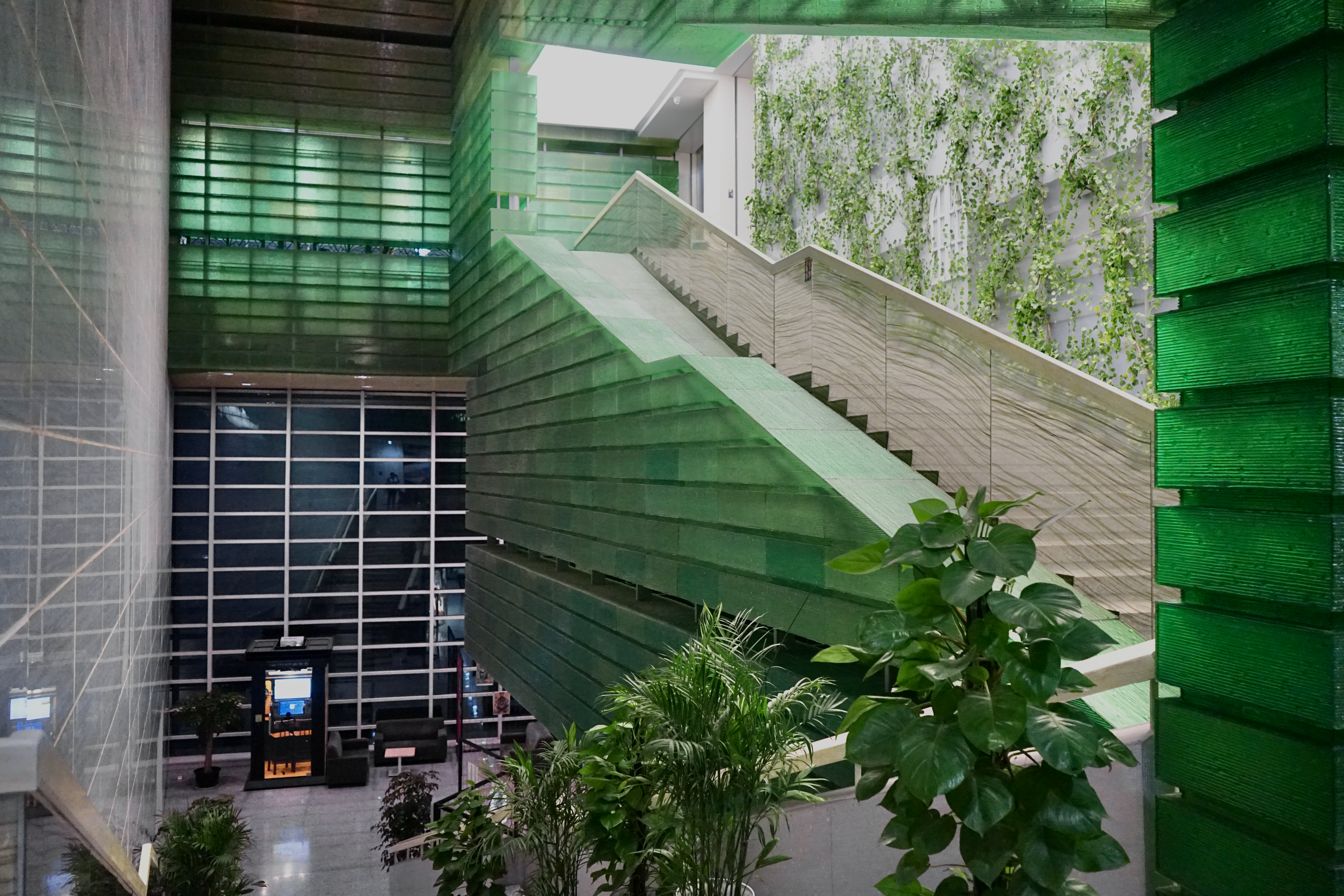
The atrium of the new building finished in 2015.

In April 2001, an open-shelf policy was implemented in the stack room for the checkout service. The gate and the atrium of the Library building began refurbishment in August 2003. On 18 May 2004, the Library celebrated its 100th anniversary.

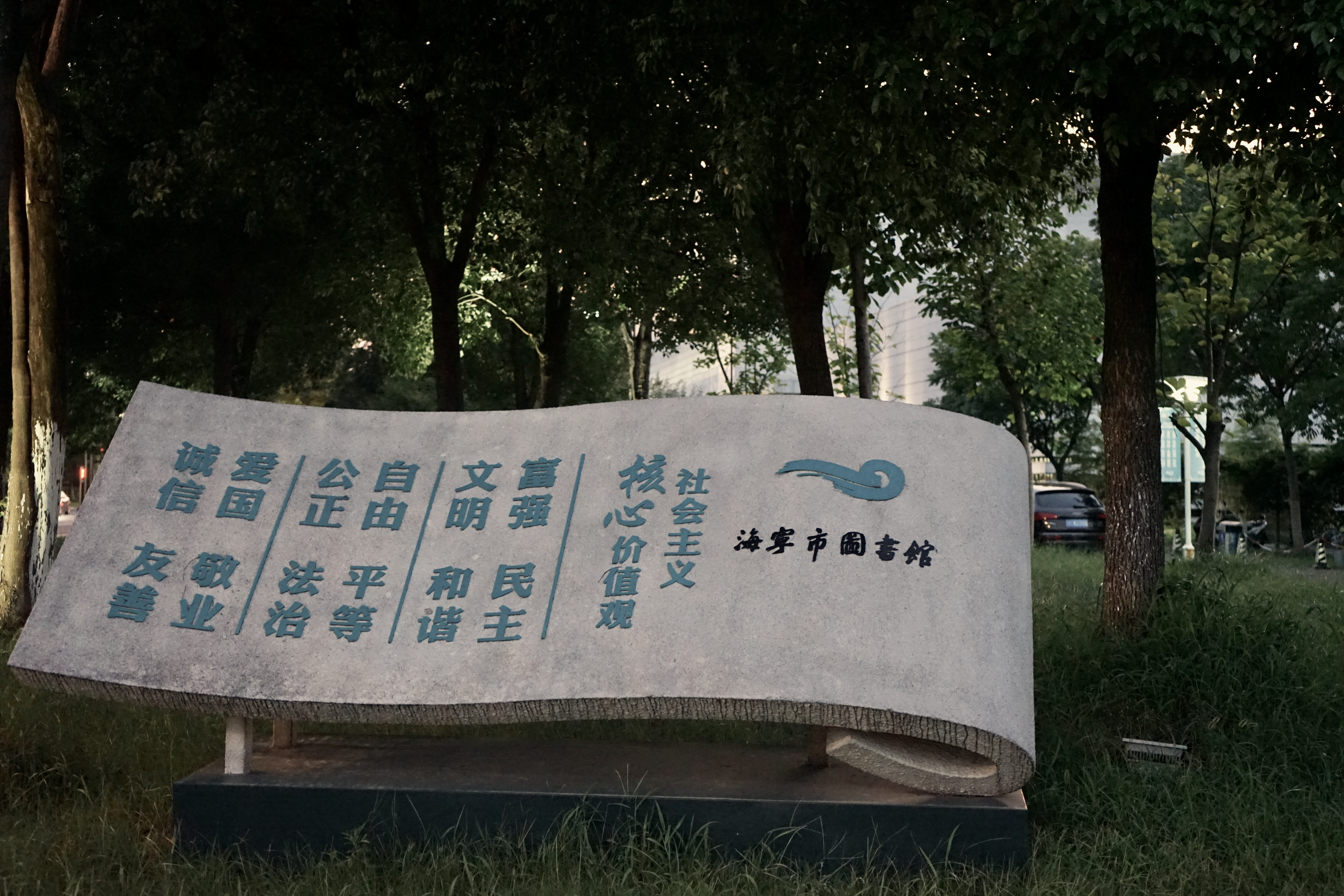
The sculpture outside of the main building, which is inscribed with the logo of the Library and the Core Socialist Values

In 2009, the Library began planning for the construction of new library buildings, with a budget of 87.6 million RMB. The plan was later listed in the 11th 5-year plan of Haining City. In September, Wang Wei, Chief Architect of the Design Institute of Landscape and Architecture, China Academy of Art, was invited by the Library to design the new buildings. After 2-month visit to Haining from Hangzhou, Wang Wei finished the draft design of the new buildings and he was formally appointed to design the building in February 2010. Yet, the original blueprint was never carried out for its high difficulty in construction. Wang Wei proposed another 10 new blueprints for the buildings. In 2011, the project began drafting detailed plan for construction. The construction began on 16 March 2012. In the New Year's Day of 2015, the new buildings with a total floor area of 19,900 square metres, came into use. During the construction of the new buildings, Haining Library was ranked as one of 10 Most Beautiful Basic-Level Libraries of 2014 across China by the 2014 Annual Symposium of China Libraries hosted by the Ministry of Culture. In March 2015, the local Youth League, in cooperation with the Library, formed a volunteer team to call for volunteering in the Library among its users. In January 2016, the Library Council was formed, which was the first council in a public cultural service in Haining. Haining Library was also the first library to form such an organisation in Jiaxing.

== Architectures ==
=== Main Building ===
Haining Library is the latest of my triads of Jiangnan architectures, presenting my thoughts on the architectures in Jiangnan.

— Wang Wei, the designer of the main building

The main building of the Library is located at 60-62 Xuelin Street, east to Wenzong Road and north to Xuelin Street. The floor area of the building is 19,900 square metres with the area of basements included. The cost of the construction of the building is 135 million RMB. The building is designed to store at most 800,000 books open to access on the shelves and contains 1,000 seat.

The building was designed by Wang Wei, Chief Architect of the Design Institute of Landscape and Architecture, China Academy of Art. The outline of the building resembles two opened book, adding to the cultural atmospheres of the building. Green plants are placed within and around the building and an ornamental plant area is located in the east. The wall and the stairs are decorated with green plants. The lobby inside is roomy, with concise colors, making the room quiet and mansuetude. The pond outside the south gate of the building reflects against the building, echoing the charm of traditional watery towns of Jiangnan in a modern way.

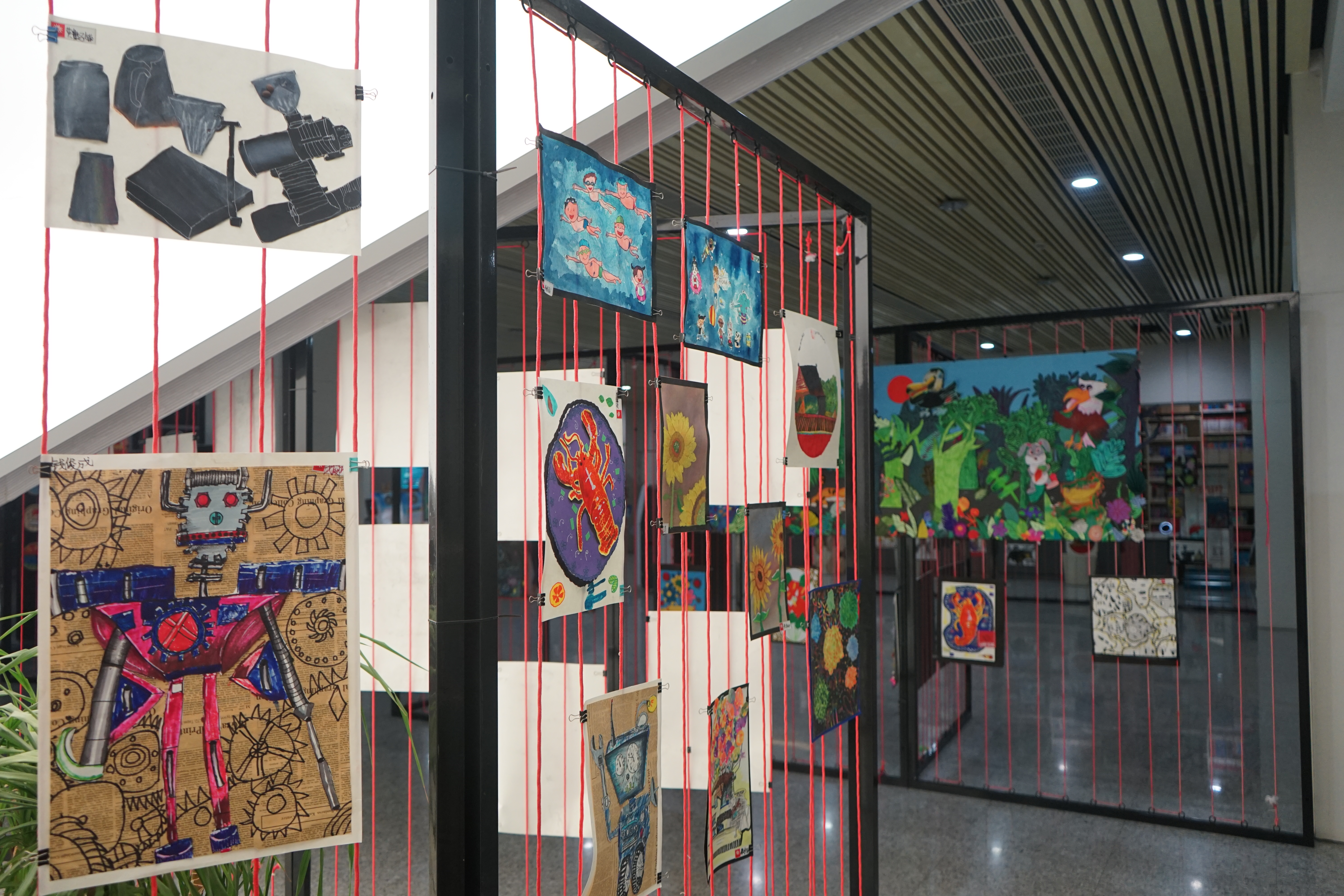
Exhibition of local children's paintings in the Library

The Library provides checkout services for visually disabled people and children, apart from the general checkout services. It also provides parental reading rooms, newspaper rooms, a centre for ancient and local literature, a multimedia centre, a prep space. The checkout service for visually disabled people was set up in May 2007, which provides with digital books, audio books, books in braille. Checkout services for children and parental reading rooms provides toys, pictures books, free Internet access, and a digital workshop for parents and children. Newspaper rooms provides checkout services for newspapers and magazines. The Centre for Ancient and Local Literature provides historic and local literature open-to-access on the shelves, yet all the resources in the centre should be taken out of the centre. The multimedia service centre provides services including digital reading, movie watching, etc. The centre is open to adult, whereas people under 14 are not allowed into certain areas of the centre. The prep room provides a space for self-studying. Coffee and other drinks and snacks are available in the Leisure Bar in the building.

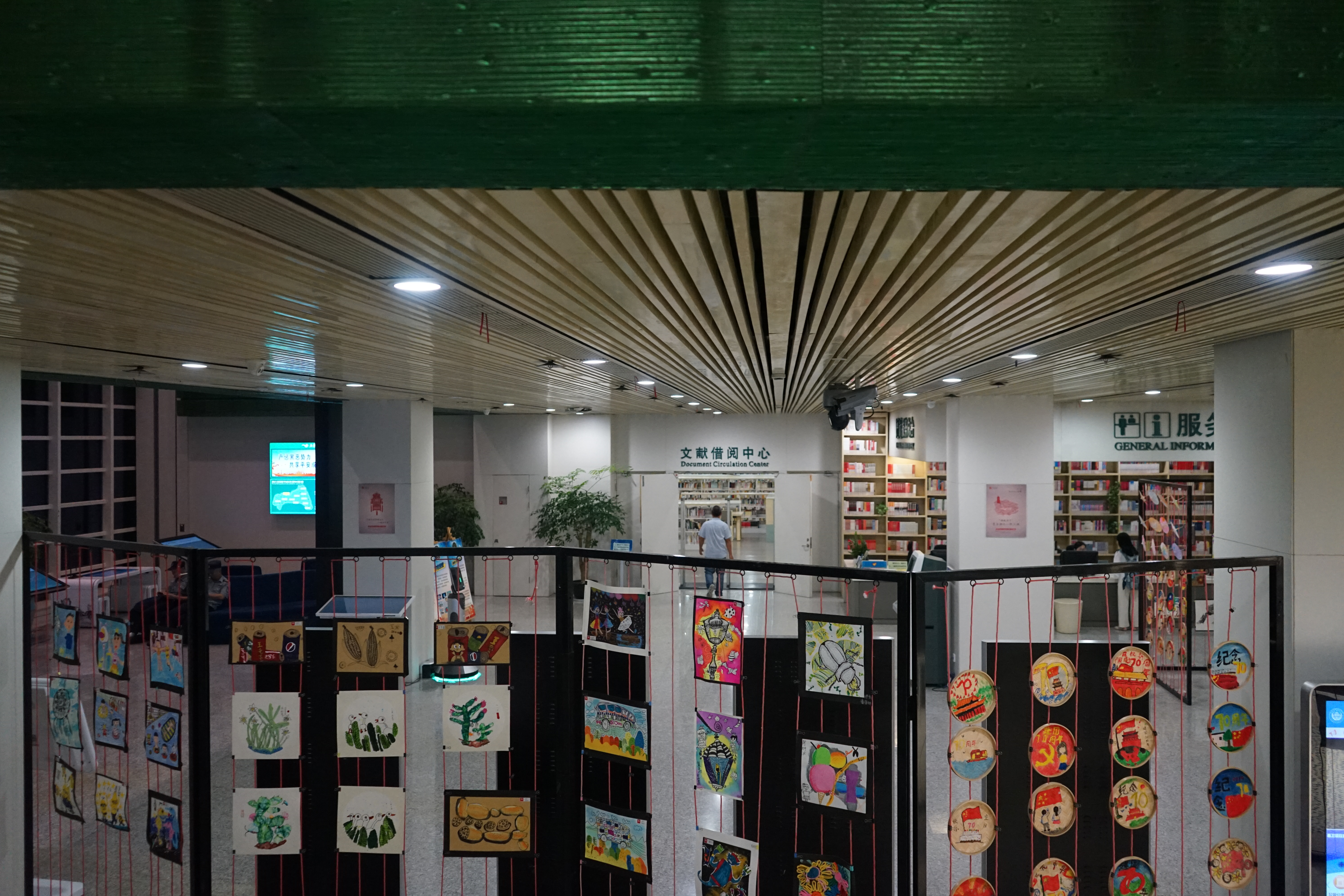
A glance at 1F of the main building.

Floor plan of the Library and the operating time schedule (UTC+8)
Floor		Services	Operating time		
Floor		Services	Jan/Feb/Mar/Nov/Dec	Apr/May/Jun/Oct	Jul/Aug/Sep
5F		Activity Room (综合活动室)	—N/a		
5F		Library Office (馆务办公室)	—N/a		
5F		Training Area (培训区)	—N/a		
4F		Readers' Saloon (读者沙龙区)	—N/a		
4F		Centre for Ancient and Local Literature (古籍地方文献中心)	Closed on Monday		
4F		Centre for Ancient and Local Literature (古籍地方文献中心)	Other days 8:30-11:30 13:30-17:00	Other days 8:30-11:30 14:00-17:30	Other days 8:30-11:30 14:30-17:30
3F		Multimedia Service Centre (多媒体服务中心)	Monday 8:30-17:00 Other days 8:30-20:30	Monday 8:30-17:30 Other days 8:30-20:30	
3F		Prep Room (自修室)	Monday 8:30-17:00 Other days 8:30-20:30	Monday 8:30-17:30 Other days 8:30-20:30	
2F	West wing	Newspaper Room (报刊借阅中心)	Monday 8:30-17:00 Other days 8:30-20:30	Monday 8:30-17:30 Other days 8:30-20:30	
2F	East wing	Mi Gu Gallery (米谷画廊)	Other days 8:30-11:30 13:30-17:00	Other days 8:30-11:30 14:00-17:30	Other days 8:30-11:30 14:30-17:30
一层	West wing	General Service Counter (服务总台)	Monday 8:30-17:00 Other days 8:30-20:30	Monday 8:30-17:30 Other days 8:30-20:30	
一层	West wing	Checkout service (文献借阅中心)	Monday 8:30-17:00 Other days 8:30-20:30	Monday 8:30-17:30 Other days 8:30-20:30	
一层	West wing	Checkout service for visually disabled people (视障文献借阅区)	8:30-11:30 13:30-17:00	8:30-11:30 14:00-17:30	8:30-11:30 14:30-17:30
一层	East wing	24-hour self-service checkout service (24小时自助借还区)	7/24 (all day long)		
一层	East wing	Checkout service for children (少儿文献借阅区)	Monday 13:30-17:00 Other days 8:30-20:30	Monday 14:00-17:30 Other days 8:30-20:30	Monday 8:30-17:30 Other days 8:30-20:30
一层	East wing	Parental Reading Area (亲子阅读区)	Monday 13:30-17:00 Other days 8:30-20:30	Monday 14:00-17:30 Other days 8:30-20:30	Monday 8:30-17:30 Other days 8:30-20:30
一层	East wing	Leisure Bar (休闲吧)	Monday 8:30-17:00 Other days 8:30-20:30	Monday 8:30-17:30 Other days 8:30-20:30	
一层	East wing	Memorial of Cha Chi Ming (查济民纪念馆)	Closed on Monday		
一层	East wing	Memorial of Cha Chi Ming (查济民纪念馆)	Other days 8:30-11:30 13:30-17:00	Other days 8:30-11:30 14:00-17:30	Other days 8:30-11:30 14:30-17:30
Note: The English names of the services are not given. The English names listed above are for references only.

=== Branches ===
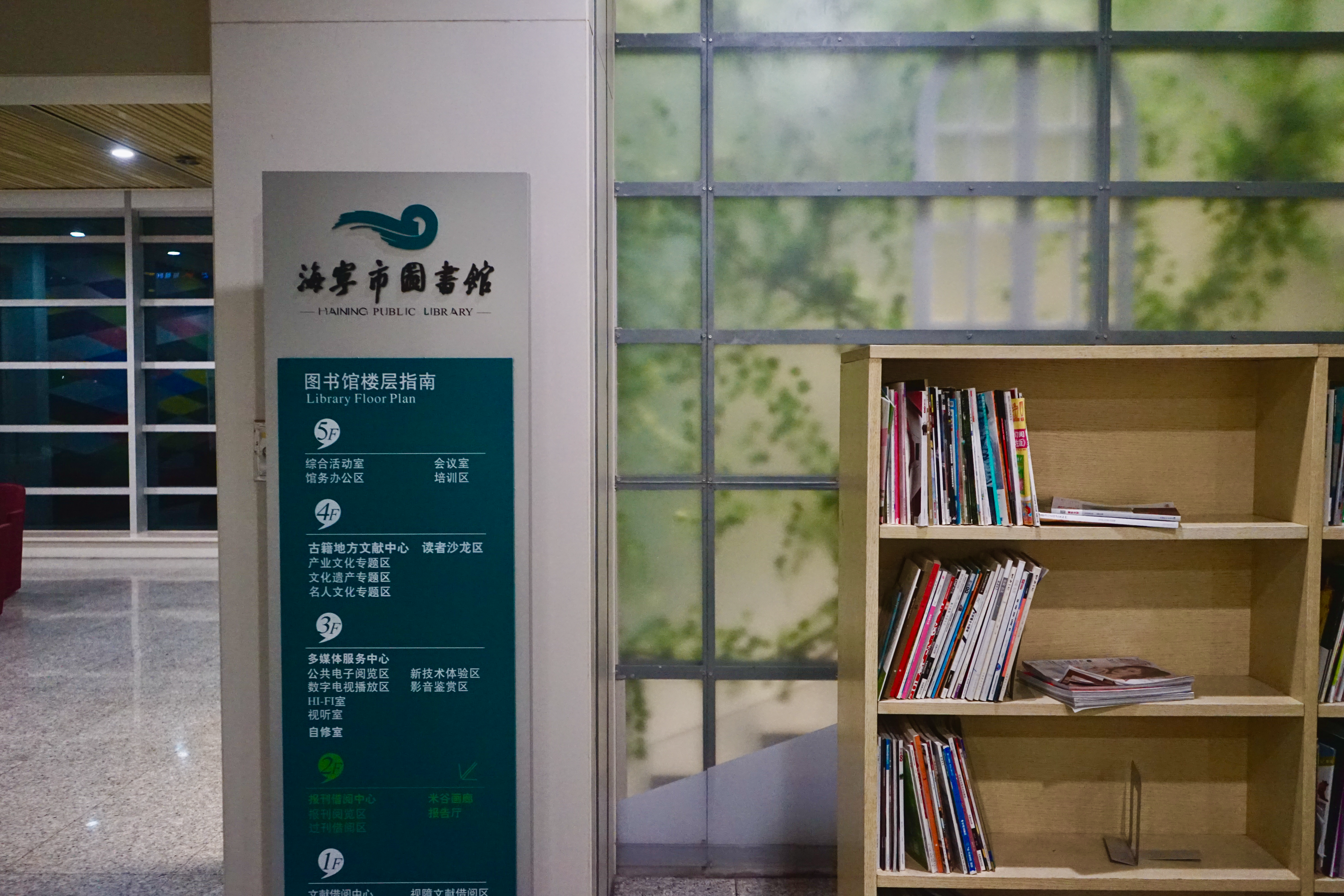
Library floor plan

Since 2008, the Library has been engaged in the urban-rural integration of the public library services, using various methods to promote the collection and use of local literature. As of August 2018, there are 11 branches of the Library located in every town under Haining City. Besides, the Library is also in charge of three theme libraries, three libraries within local companies, eight village libraries, 13 community libraries, five automatic community libraries. As of September 2016, there are 179 farm reading room across Haining supported by the Library.

In May 2016, the Library set a "mobile library" called Yuelu (阅路; 閱路; 'Reading Road'). The library is located within a 10-metre-long bus. With the bookshelves inside of the bus, it can carry over 2000 books and over 100 journals. The library also has space for readers by providing tables and chairs. The library runs on eight routes like a public bus.

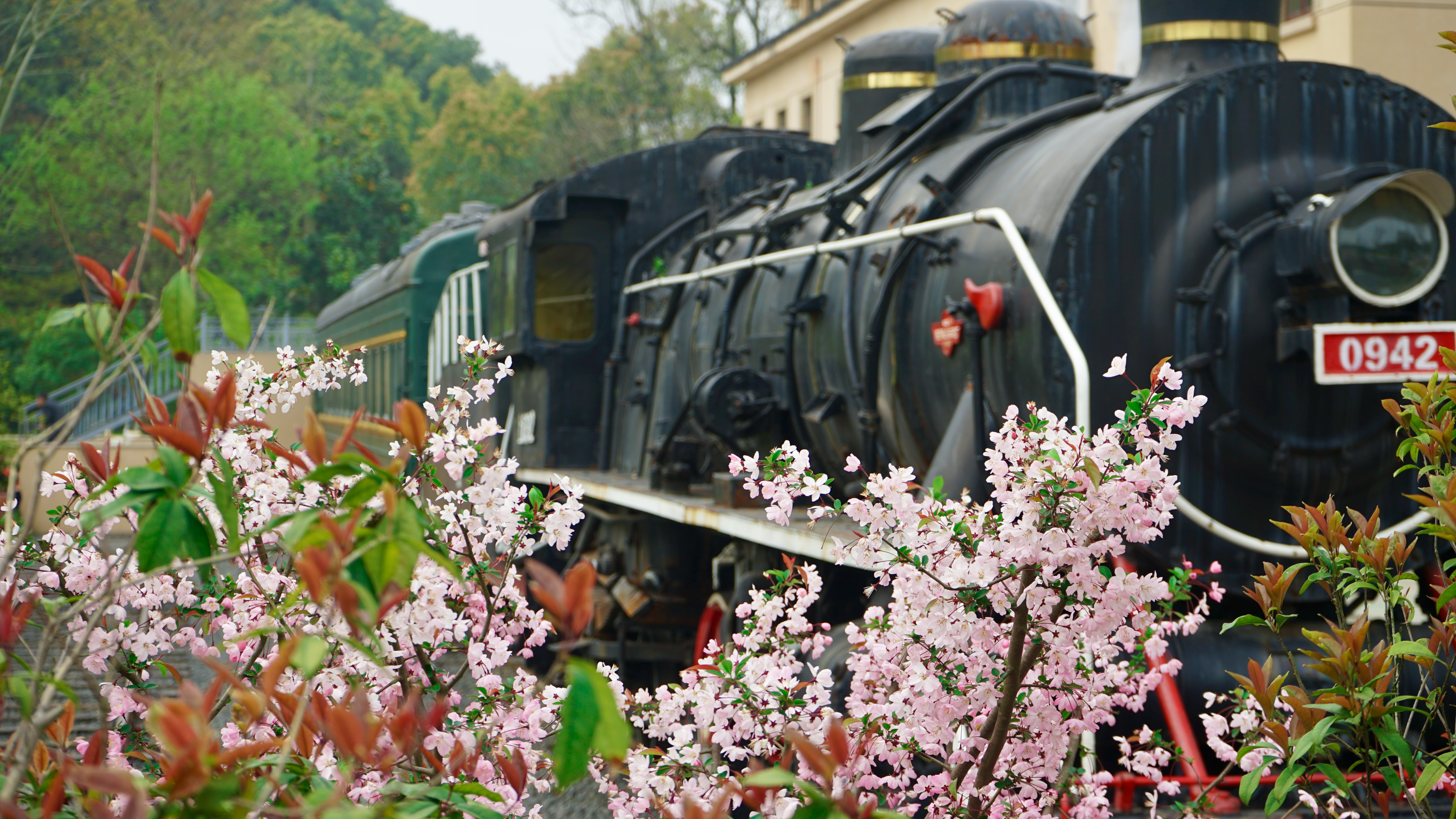
Automated library at Xishan Park, which is transformed from an old train car.

The library also set up a community library at the old site of Xiashi Railway Station in Xishan Park, which is located inside an old train car. The style of its decoration mimics that in the Republican period. Since the Library was located upon Xishan in 1963, this library was regarded to memorize the history of both the old train station and the library itself.

Town-level Branches of Haining Libraries
Name	Date of establishment	Floor area by square metre	Book Stock	Location	Telephone No.
Branch of Yanguan (盐官分馆)	December 18, 2008	500	20000	2nd floor of Cultural Activity Centre (north to Dongxi Avenue), Yanguan Town (盐官镇文化活动中心二楼（东西大道北侧）)	+86-(0)573- 87683988
Branch of Xieqiao (斜桥分馆)	December 18, 2008	500	27000	56 Xiechuan Road, Xieqiao Town (斜桥镇斜川路56号)	+86-(0)573- 87714579
Branch of Haichang (海昌分馆)	November 30, 2010	580	20000	2nd floor of Jinsanjiao Market at the Youquan Road-Luolong Road Intersection, Haichang Subdistrict (海昌街道由拳路洛隆路口，金三角农贸市场2楼)	+86-(0)573- 87280297
Branch of Xiashi (硖石分馆)	August 20, 2010	500	20000	Xiashi Culture and Education Centre (east to the City Party School), Xiashi Subdistrict (硖石街道海州东路市委党校东侧硖石文化教育中心)	+86-(0)573- 87280297
Branch of Zhouwangmiao (周王庙分馆)	November 18, 2009	500	20000	Building 2,1 Gexing Road, Zhouwangmiao Town (周王庙镇革兴路1号2楼)	+86-(0)573- 87539283
Branch of Chang'an (长安分馆)	December 17, 2010	1400	26000	3rd floor of Culture and Education Centre at the intersection of Kaiyuan Road and Yangshan Road (长安镇文教中心三楼，开元路与仰山路交叉口)	+86-(0)573- 87478190
Branch of Xucun (许村分馆)	November 12, 2010	600	28000	2nd floor of the Culture and Education Centre next to the Town Office, Xucun Town (许村镇政府旁许村镇文教中心2楼)	+86-(0)573- 87516696
Branch of Dingqiao (丁桥分馆)	December 22, 2010	720	20000	126 Guangchang Road, Dingqiao Town (丁桥镇广场路126号)	+86-(0)573- 87662382
Branch of Maqiao (马桥分馆)	January 20, 2010	640	20000	3rd floor of the Xianfeng Village Centre for Cultural activity, Maqiao Subdistrict (马桥街道北段先锋村文化活动中心3楼)	+86-(0)573- 87662382
Branch of Yuanhua (袁花分馆)	December 18, 2010	500	17000	2nd floor of Centre for Cultural activity, Yuanhua Town (袁花镇文化活动中心2楼)	+86-(0)573- 87865993
Branch of Jianshan (尖山分馆)	December 18, 2010	1000	20000	1st floor of the Culture Centre of Jianshan New Area (Huangwan Town) (尖山新区（黄湾镇）文化中心1楼)	—N/a

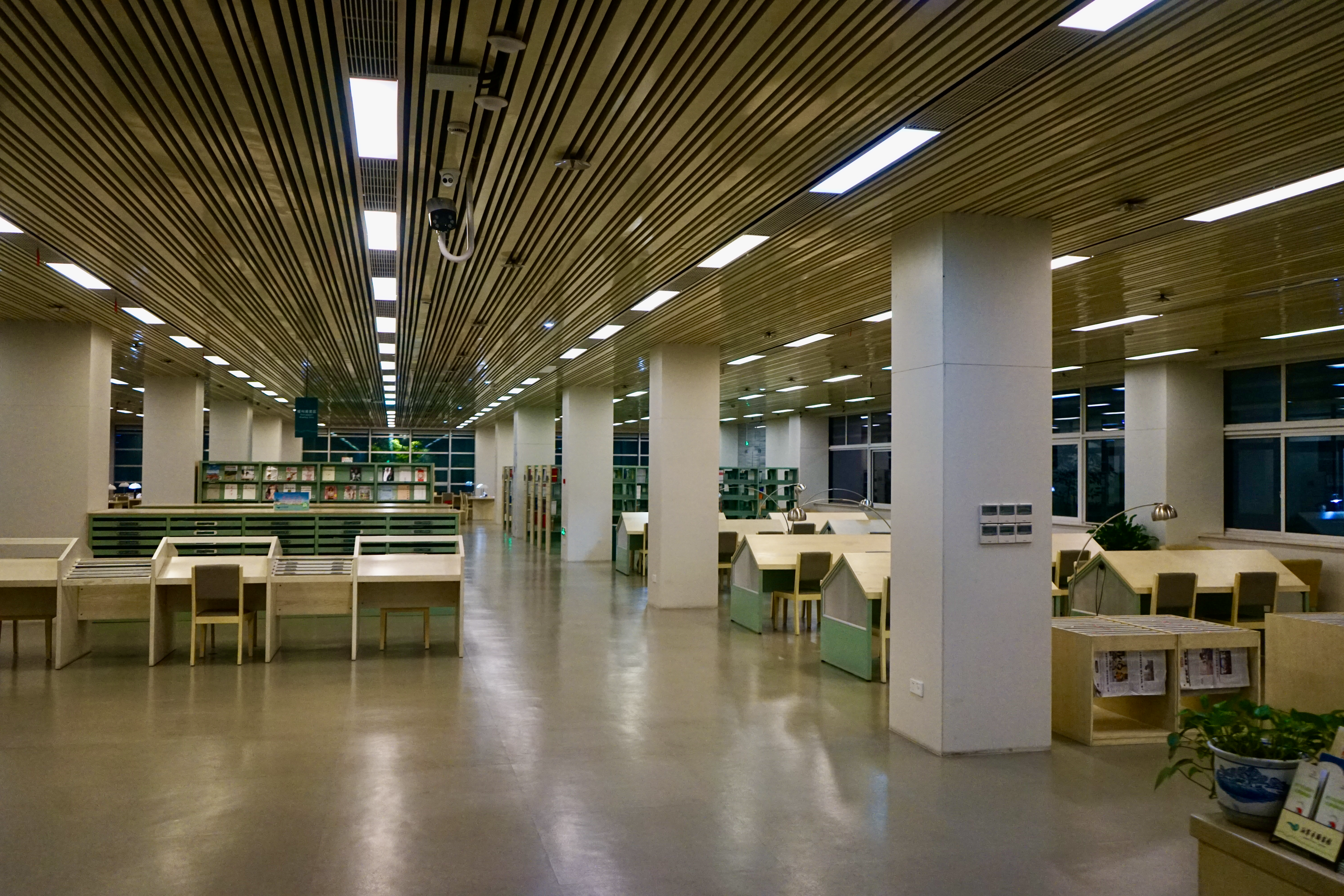
Reading room at 2F of the main building

== Services ==
As of August 2018, the library contains 1.7 million items, with over 27 thousand ancient books included. In 2017, the Library received 3,184,320 person-times of visitors, with the number of the new registered reader card increasing by 26,882. The annual circulation of the books reached 4,930,618 book-times, which means averagely, every Haining resident borrowed 5.9 books in the year. In the financial year of 2016, the Library had 28 employees as civil servants, with an income of 16,766,874.91 RMB and an outgoing of 17,880,009 RMB. Haining Library is affiliated to Haining Municipal Bureau of Culture, Radio, Television, Tourism and Sport. The Library Council, consisting of 13 members, is the supervisor and policy maker of the Library.

=== Checkout and returning ===
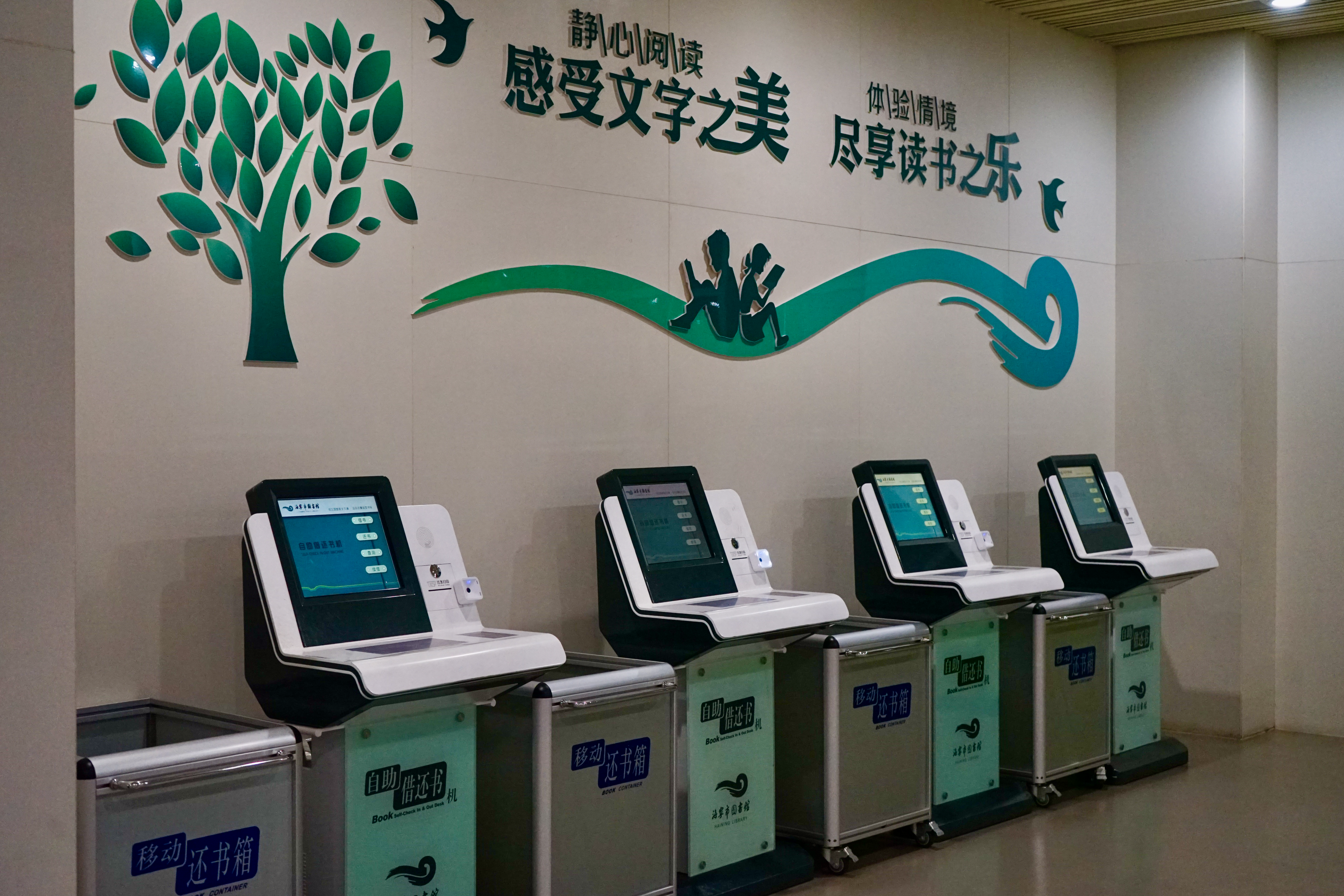
Automated machines for returning and borrowing

Applying for a reader card of the Library requires the identity card of Chinese citizens or other valid identity documents of the applicant and a deposit of 100 RMB. If the applicant is under 18, the valid documents of his/her guardian is required and a deposit of 50 RMB are required instead. There is automated machine available for adult applicants in the Library. The reader card should be registered for free in the main building or any branches of the Library annually. Haining Citizen Card can be used for the checkout service without such application or registration. A reader card can be used to borrow at most five books at the same time, while the Citizen Card of an adult can be used to borrow at most 15, children's 10. Each book can only have a 21-day extension after due. The overdue fee is 0.1 RMB per book per day for an adult reader and 0.05 RMB per book per day for a minor reader.

=== Digital services ===
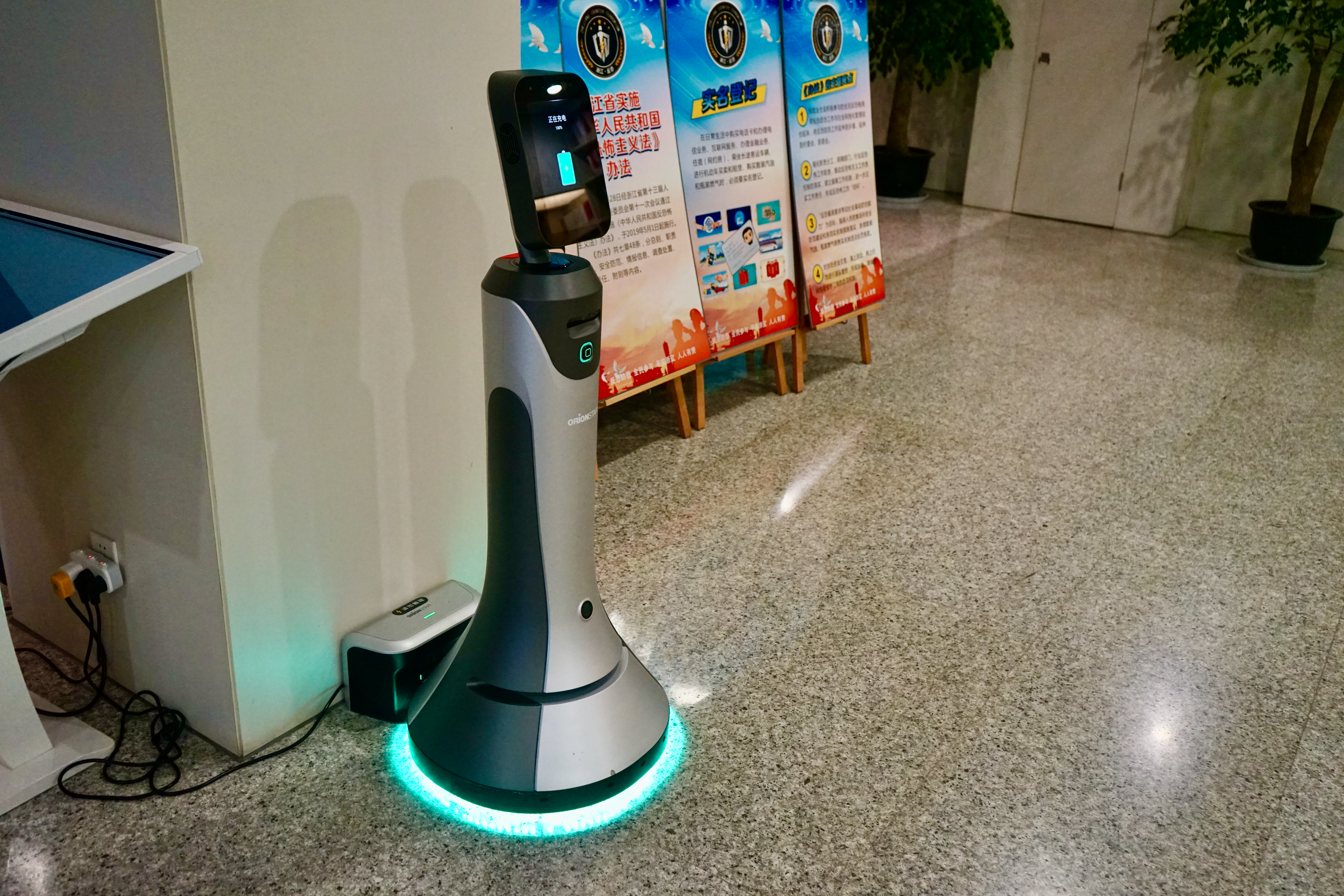
A service robot in the Library

The website of the Library opened in January 2002. Since 3 June 2006, the Library began providing a service called "Digital Library", where the digital books of Jiaxing Library can be accessed online, digital journal articles can be accessed in reading rooms. The Library also provides access to the resources via mobile phones.

The digital reading room of the Library opened on 13 June 2001, equipped with 31 computers and related accessory devices, costing and a government fund of 310,000 RMB. Free access to online database such as CNKI etc. became available on 15 October 2007. The local Federation of Disabled Persons donated a smart reading device embedded with 96 books in braille. There is also a digital newspaper reading device in the newspaper room. Automated services including returning and borrowing, card application are also available. The Library provides free Wi-Fi access viaHilib-wifi, after login in with China Resident ID number and the number of Haining Citizen Card (previous registration needed) or the number of the reader card.

== See also ==
- List of libraries in China
