= Qiu Shi Science and Technology Prize =

The Qiu Shi Prizes (simplified Chinese: 求是奖; traditional Chinese: 求是獎) are awarded on an annual basis in recognition of advances in science and technology. The Qiu Shi Science and Technology Foundation was established by Cha Chi Ming (查濟民) (1914–2007) in 1994 in Hong Kong, with the intention of promoting science and technology research in China, and to encourage and reward successful Chinese scientists and scholars. Prizes are awarded each year Prize categories include Physics, Chemistry, Physiology or Medicine, Mathematics or Information Technology.

Qiu Shi (Chinese: 求是; pronounced ch-OO/sh-ER) means "seeking truth". The Qiu Shi Foundation was named after Qiu Shi Academy (Chinese: 求是书院) in Hangzhou, which was subsequently renamed Zhejiang University (浙江大学). Qiu Shi Science and Technology Foundation is not related to the Qiushi journal, the political theory periodical.

== Founder/Foundation ==
Cha Chi-ming, GBM, JP, was born in 1914, in Haining County, Jiaxing, Zhejiang province. He studied textile technology and graduated from Zhejiang University in 1931. Cha built a multinational textile conglomerate. He was the chairman of CDW International Limited, The Mingly Corporation Limited and Hong Kong Resort International Limited. With his family, he donated US$20 million in 1994 to establish the award.

== The Qiu Shi Advisory Board ==
Members:

Chen Ning Yang (a Nobel laureate in physics), Zhou Guangzhao (physicist, and honorary chairman of China Association for Science and Technology), Yuan T. Lee (a Nobel laureate in chemistry), Yuet Wai Kan (genetic researcher), David Ho (physician and innovator of the "cocktail" therapy for HIV), Andrew Yao (computer scientist and the first Asian A.M. Turing Award recipient).

== Prize types ==
Alumni
