= Hotel amenity =

Features provided in a hotel

A hotel amenity is a desirable or useful feature provided when renting a room at a hotel, motel, or other place of lodging. The amenities provided in each hotel vary; In some places of lodging, certain amenities may be standard with all rooms while in others, they may be optional for an additional cost.

== In the room ==
=== Kitchen facilities ===
Some hotels offer kitchen facilities or food storage. In some hotels, this may take the form of a kitchenette, which may include a full-size or half-size refrigerator, an oven, a stove, a sink, and cabinets, although these are more common in extended stay hotels.

Other accommodations may include only a half-size refrigerator, a microwave oven, or a coffeemaker.

Hotels without kitchen facilities in guest rooms sometimes provide shared facilities in the lobby for guests to use.

=== Television ===
A television set is a standard item in most hotel rooms. In the past, coin-operated pay TVs existed. Standard TV channels are free to watch, but some hotels charge extra for cable TV or satellite TV services.

With the advent of portable video through mobile and tablet devices, hotels have had a harder time generating revenue with their in room televisions.

=== Computer and Internet access ===
Most hotels offer internet access, most commonly as Wi-Fi, which can be used by guests who bring their own devices. In most hotels, this is free, though some charge a fee.

Some hotels offer hard-wired internet service requiring the use of a cable for the hook-up.

=== Washer and Dryer ===
Many hotel rooms, especially family rooms have a washer/dryer unit inside of the room

They may also provide computers and printers in the lobby for all guests to use. Some hotels offer in-room tablet computers for guests to use.

=== Personal items ===
Many personal items are provided complimentary for use by guests. These may include irons and ironing boards, hair dryers, soap, shampoo, mouthwash, or shower caps. A trend in personal items in the United States is to focus on American-made toiletries.

In 2007, hotel amenity provider Gilchrist & Soames, conducted a voluntary worldwide recall, in cooperation with the Food and Drug Administration of its 18-milliliter or 0.65-ounce tubes of complementary toothpaste with the company name on it. Gilchrist & Soames immediately quarantined its toothpaste, made in China, after the FDA issued its warning that the toothpaste possibly contained diethylene glycol. The FDA stated at the time that it was not aware of any U.S. reports of any harmful effects from the toothpaste containing diethylene glycol. Not all items are provided by all hotels; for example, some hotels do not provide toothpaste.

=== Hair dryer ===

In some hotels, a hair dryer is offered for guests use.

=== Towels ===
Towels on a rack in a hotel room

Hotels generally provide towels to guests for their use.

One concern with the provision of towels is theft. Towel theft has proven costly to hotels, though hotels have been reported to do little to combat the problem. In 2003, Holiday Inn offered amnesty to those who returned stolen towels.

Some hotels have outfitted towels with RFID technology to reduce the frequency of theft.

== Outside the room ==
=== Dining ===
Various forms of dining are offered in hotels. Some hotels offer a continental breakfast that is often complimentary to guests. Items often served include cereal, pastries, waffles, sausage, fruits, and beverages.

Some hotels have on-site restaurants. In most cases, the meals must be paid for. In some hotels, room service is available to guests.

Some resorts are all-inclusive resorts, allowing guests access to food at little or no charge at all times of day throughout their visits.

=== Vending ===
Vending machines are provided at many hotels and motels. These machines usually sell soft drinks, snacks, and other items commonly sold in vending machines.

Ice dispensers are also standard. While in some hotels, the ice may be complimentary, there may be a fee to obtain ice in others.

=== Exercise ===
Some hotels have fitness centers allowing guests to work out during their visits. A recent trend at some upscale properties has seen some of the exercise and fitness programs held outdoors.

=== Recreation ===
Many resorts offer various recreational activities, such as golf, tennis, and other popular sports.

=== Swimming pools ===
Some hotels offer swimming pool access. Outdoor pools may be open seasonally in temperate climates. Indoor pools can be open year round in any climate.

=== Parking ===
Most hotels offer free self-parking, though many in cities charge for parking, especially if the parking is in a garage or multi-storey car park. Some hotels offer valet parking services.
