= Elias Wen =

Chinese-American Eastern Orthodox clergyman

- Chinese: 文子正
Transcriptions
Standard Mandarin
- Hanyu Pinyin: Wén Zǐzhèng
- Wade–Giles: Wen^{2} Tsu^{3}-cheng^{4}

Fr. Elias Wen, Chinese name Wen Zizheng (traditional Chinese: 伊利亞·文子正; simplified Chinese: 伊利亚·文子正; 10 November 1896 – 9 June 2007), was the oldest clergyman of the Eastern Orthodox Church when he died aged 110 in San Francisco, California.

Fr. Elias was born into a poor bricklayer/tiler family in Beijing in 1896 and converted to the Orthodox Christian Faith aged 7. From 1905 to 1916 he studied at the Russian Orthodox Mission school in Beijing, and then at the Seminary there from 1916 until 1925. He was ordained a deacon in 1924, and a priest in 1925. On 24 June 1935, he became one of the founding members of the Shanghai China Orthodox Association; he served as one of three vice-chairmen of the association under chairman Yu Ya-ching. In 1946 he became the rector of the Surety of Sinners Russian Orthodox Cathedral in Shanghai, and served under St. John (Maximovitch).

In 1949, he fled China to Hong Kong, as the Communists took over the mainland, and in 1957 he was transferred to the Holy Virgin Cathedral in San Francisco, where he again served under St. John.

He was elevated to the rank of protopresbyter in 1981. He remained at this cathedral for the remainder of his life. Fr. Elias is survived by five sons, one daughter, 14 grandchildren and six great-grandchildren.

== See also ==
- Oldest people
