= 2007 Euroleague Challenge =

The Euroleague Challenge 2007, also called CBA-Euroleague Challenge is the basketball tournament for clubs, progressing in China.The teams: (Australia) Sydney Kings, (Russia) CSKA Moscow, (Italy) Benetton Treviso and China are competing from September 30 until October 2.

== Results ==
September 30
12:30(CET)

CSKA Moscow (Russia)	71–62	(Australia) Sydney Kings
Scoring by quarter: 23-14, 20-18, 17-11, 11-19
Pts: Aleksey Savrasenko 13; Rebs: David Andersen 8 Asts: Theodoros Papaloukas 4		Pts: Dontaye Draper 19; Rebs: Glen Saville 6 Asts: Draper, Jason Smith, Saville 1

Kunshan, China
Attendance: 4500

September 30
15:00(CET)

Benetton Treviso (Italy)	75–78	China
Scoring by quarter: 16-21, 18-21, 21-17, 20-19
Pts: Yao Ming 32; Rebs: Yao Ming 10; Asts: Zhu Fangyu 3		Pts: DerMarr Johnson 19; Rebs: Mario Austin 9 Asts: Matteo Soragna 2

Kunshan, China
Attendance: 5000

October 1
8:30(CET)

China	77–83	(Russia) CSKA Moscow
Scoring by quarter: 17-21, 16-17, 28-23, 16-22
Pts: Yao Ming 27; Rebs: Yi Jianlian 6 Asts: Zhu Fangyu 4		Pts: Trajan Langdon 22; Rebs: Langdon, Vorontsevich 7 Asts: Nikos Zisis 3

Kunshan, China
Attendance: 4500

October 1
11:00(CET)

Benetton Treviso (Italy)	75–82	(Australia) Sydney Kings
Scoring by quarter: 18-20, 20-18, 21-13, 16-31
Pts: Lionel Chalmers 17; Rebs: Mario Austin 11; Asts: Lionel Chalmers 2		Pts: Mark Worthington 24; Rebs: Glen Saville 8 Asts: Draper, Worthington 4

Kunshan, China
Attendance: 4500

October 2
10:00(CET)

China	79–79	(Australia) Sydney Kings

Kunshan, China

== Final standing ==
- 1. (Russia) CSKA Moscow
- 2.China
- 3. (Australia) Sydney Kings
- 4. (Italy) Benetton Treviso
