= Storm Online =

2007 video game

- Developer(s): Chengdu Aurora Technology Development Co. Ltd
- Publisher(s): (China) Shanda Games; (Russia) Mail.Ru Games; (Taiwan) Unalis Co. Ltd; (Singapore) (Malaysia) (Philippines) (Australia) Shanda Games
- Platform(s): Windows
- Release: CHN: July, 2007; RUS: May 2008; TWN: October 2009; SEA: November 2010
- Genre(s): Fantasy MMORPG
- Mode(s): MMORPG

Storm Online (Simplified Chinese: 风云; Traditional Chinese: 雄霸天下; Russian: Поднебесье) is a free-to-play 2.5D fantasy MMORPG (Massively Multiplayer Online Role-Playing Game), developed by Chengdu Aurora Technology Development Co.Ltd, first launched in China in July 2007. It was well received in Taiwan when launched in May 2008 by Unalis Co. Ltd and Pili puppets were used as to endorse the game.

The launch of the first English version was scheduled to be in November 2010 by Shanda Games from its international office in Singapore.

== Gameplay ==
Backed by the rich background story of Storm Online, the tension and hostility from warring nations means constant PVP opportunities for thrill-seekers while an abundance of exciting quests.

=== Classes ===
There are 3 gender-locked classes in Storm Online.

Warrior
Male, uses Falchion and long swords. Strong tanker and engager with melee DPS with AOE stun. Job advancement between Swordsmanship and Art of Saber.
Mage
Male, uses Staff to yield high DPS with AOE skills. Job advancement between Fire mage, Thunderbolt mage and Three Realm of Eternity.
Hunter
Female, uses Bow and Crossbow. Healer with AOE skill. A versatile class that can fulfill both support and attack roles. Job advancement between Auxiliary, Archer and Crossbow.

=== Kingdoms ===
Fiery Sky
Descendants of the Devil, Militaristic, Ruthless
Encroaching Winds
Neutral nation, Cautious, Distrusts Other Nations
Vast Clouds
Vengeful, Courageous, Dislikes Stable Earth
Stable Earth
Loyal to the Gods, Loyal, Honourable

=== Quest ===
Storm Online is not a grind feast MMORPG. There are main line quests known as Plot Quest; tasks that are interlinked with a storyline. Different Plot Quests would be unlocked when certain level is achieved. A red flag in the mini map signifies an available quest in the location.
