= Gilchrist & Soames =

American hotel amenity marketer

- Company type: Privately held
- Industry: Personal care products
- Founded: 1975
- Founders: Anthony Karger and Michael Karger
- Headquarters: Somerset, New Jersey, United States
- Products: Hotel amenities
- Number of employees: 100+
- Parent: Sysco Guest Supply
- Website: www.gilchristsoames.com

Gilchrist & Soames is a Somerset, New Jersey–based marketer of English-themed in-room toiletry hotel amenities. The company also maintains an office in Aldermaston, West Berkshire.

== History and corporate ownership ==
Founded in London in 1975 by Anthony Karger and Michael Karger, Gilchrist & Soames’ early product line focused on home fragrance and candles. In 1984, Gilchrist & Soames was purchased by Potter & Moore, a UK-based toiletries company.

In 1998, Indianapolis-based E&A Industries, an Indiana conglomerate owned by Allan B. Hubbard, an Indianapolis businessman, acquired the company and moved North American operations to Indianapolis. E&A, in 2007, sold Gilchrist & Soames for $51 million to Swander Pace Capital, a San Francisco private-equity firm. In September 2015, Gilchrist & Soames was acquired by Sysco Guest Supply, a subsidiary of Sysco.

== Manufacturing ==
Gilchrist & Soames' 250,000 square-foot manufacturing, research, development and distribution facility is headquartered in Plainfield, Indiana.

== Recalls ==
In August 2007, Gilchrist & Soames conducted a voluntary worldwide recall, in cooperation with the FDA, of its toothpaste with the company name on it. Gilchrist & Soames recalled its toothpaste, made by Ming Fai Enterprises International Co Ltd, after the FDA issued its warning that tests showed the toothpaste contained diethylene glycol, a chemical used to thicken antifreeze that can cause liver damage.

On December 18, 2014, in cooperation with an enforcement action of the FDA, Gilchrist & Soames initiated a worldwide recall of numerous lots of several different products in its lines, including certain conditioning shampoos, mineral baths, shower gels and body washes. According to the FDA, all the products "may be contaminated with Pseudomonas aeruginosa and Enterobacter gergoviae," potentially dangerous bacteria. Gilchrist & Soames said that all recipients were notified of the recall of the dangerous products and they were able to recall up to 75 percent of the products distributed.

On December 7, 2015, in cooperation with another enforcement action of the FDA, Gilchrist & Soames initiated a worldwide voluntary Class II recall of a wide range of different products due to microbial contaminations. The forty-four different products included shampoos, body washes, body lotions, mineral baths, and numerous other types of products, amounting to more than two million items. They included Gilchrist & Soames pseudo-brands, such as Spa Therapy, Verde, and BeeKind, and they also included custom products produced for such hospitality properties as Gaylord Hotels and Hyatt. The affected products were produced from June 2015 through September 2015. The contaminated products were distributed in the United States and worldwide, including in Canada and Australia.

On March 16, 2016, the United States Food and Drug Administration, responding to recalls of contaminated products sold by Gilchrist and after inspecting its plant, issued a warning letter to the company noting violations of the Federal Food, Drug, and Cosmetic Act and mandating extensive corrective actions, resulting in a temporary shutdown of parts of Gilchrist's manufacturing plant.

== FDA inspections, warning letter, and partial plant shutdown ==
On March 16, 2016, the FDA issued a warning letter to the company, based upon an on-site inspection from September 22 to October 5, 2015. The FDA noted extensive contamination with Pseudomonas aeruginosa, and concluded that such Gilchrist products were "adulterated within the meaning of section 601(a) of the Food, Drug and Cosmetic Act." In addition, the FDA criticized Gilchrist for not properly maintaining the cleanliness and safety of their mechanisms and raw materials.

The FDA did not mandate further immediate recalls, but recommended "that [Gilchrist] develop a remediation plan to correct and prevent future product contamination." A spokesman for Sysco, the owners of Gilchrist, advised that the company had temporarily closed parts of their Indiana facility for cleaning, and claimed that Gilchrist "has introduced new procedures, including increased testing of product, enhanced sanitation and new associate training."
