= Cha Chi Ming =

Chinese businessman

The Honourable Cha Chi-ming GBM JP
- Born: 1914; Haining, Zhejiang, Republic of China
- Died: 28 March 2007 (aged 92–93); Hong Kong
- Other names: Zha Jimin
- Occupations: Industrialist, entrepreneur, philanthropist

Chinese name
- Traditional Chinese: 查濟民
- Simplified Chinese: 查济民
Transcriptions
Standard Mandarin
- Hanyu Pinyin: Zhā Jìmín
- Wade–Giles: Cha Chi-min

Cha Chi-ming GBM, JP (1914 – 28 March 2007), was a Hong Kong industrialist, entrepreneur and philanthropist. He was the Chairman of CDW International Limited, Mingly Corporation Limited, and Hong Kong Resort International Limited and also a member of the Hong Kong Special Administrative Region Preparatory Committee, a member of the Hong Kong Basic Law Drafting Committee, and a Hong Kong Affairs Adviser.

== Life ==
Cha was born in Haining, Zhejiang Province. He was a distant paternal relative of the wuxia novelist Louis Cha. He studied textile technology and graduated from Zhejiang University in 1931. In 1994, he donated US$20 million to create the Qiu Shi Science and Technologies Foundation. The Foundation awards prizes such as the Qiu Shi Science and Technology Prize, to Chinese scientists who have made significant advances in their fields.

== Memorial ==
The Memorial of Cha Chi Ming is located inside of the main building of Haining Library, Zhejiang, China.

== Honours ==
- Justice of the Peace, Hong Kong, 1971
- Grand Bauhinia Medal, Hong Kong, 1997
