= Zhang Shuhong =

Chinese businessman who committed suicide (1957–2007)

- Chinese: 张树鸿
- Born: 1957
- Died: 11 August 2007 (aged 49–50); Foshan, Guangdong, China
- Occupation: Businessman
- Known for: Owner of Lee Der Industrial; involved in the 2007 Chinese export recalls
- Notable work: Oversight of Mattel and Fisher-Price toy production

Zhang Shuhong (Chinese: 张树鸿, 1957 – 11 August 2007) was a Chinese businessman and factory owner. Zhang committed suicide after toys made at his factory for Fisher-Price (a division of Mattel) were found to contain lead paint.

== Personal life ==
Zhang Shuhong grew up in Hong Kong. He first worked as an errand boy for a Hong Kong factory. He eventually moved to Guangdong province, just across the border from Hong Kong, to work in the toy factories that grew up in the area in the 1980s and 1990s. He never married.

== Lee Der Industrial ==
Zhang Shuhong worked at the Lee Der Industrial company for over ten years before taking over as head of the company's day-to-day operations. The Lee Der company, which is based in Foshan, China, and is also known as Lida, was a major supplier of toys and other products for Western companies, including Mattel and its subsidiary, Fisher-Price. Zhang was described by employees and co-workers as an entrepreneur. Lee Der Industrial was losing money and suffering financial losses at the time that Zhang took over operations. Zhang was credited with stopping the money loss. He invested much of Lee Der's earnings back into the company, investing in new buildings, capital and equipment. According to Lee Der employees, Zhang was planning to move one of his three factories to a new US$5 million plant that had recently been completed. Zhang was reportedly devoted to the Lee Der Industrial company. He resided on the factory grounds in a 25-square-meter room for the 10 years before his death to be close to his work. Zhang also owned two subsidiaries, which were named Hengjing and Shuaimeng.

== 2007 Mattel toy recall and suicide ==
On 2 August 2007, the Mattel Corporation recalled hundreds of thousands of toys which were made in China under the Fisher-Price label. These recalled Fisher-Price toys included figurines of Big Bird, Elmo and Dora the Explorer and related characters, which were manufactured by Lee Der Industrial. Some of these toys were found to have been coated in paint containing excessive levels of lead. Lead exposure, particularly from lead paint, has been found to cause vomiting, nausea, diarrhoea, and even death in children. A million toys were recalled from American stores such as Toys R Us and Walmart.

The Mattel Company sent investigators to China. Mattel identified Lee Der Industrial company as the main supplier of the lead paint-tainted toys. China immediately suspended the company's export license which had a devastating effect on the company's business. According to press reports, Lee Der Industrial stood to lose as much as $30 million due to the Fisher-Price toy recall scandal.

Mattel tracked down three paint suppliers who worked for the Lee Der company – Dongxin, Zhongxin, and Mingdai. Each of these three companies had supplied paint to factories that were contracted to make Mattel products, including Fisher-Price.

Mattel believes that specifically, the Mingdai company sold yellow paint pigment containing lead to Dongxin and Zhongxin, which produced the paint. The paint was then used by Lee Der, operated by Zhang Shuhong, to produce Mattel's line of Fisher-Price products.

It is believed that a personal friend of Zhang's ran the company that supplied the lead paint, which ultimately led to the Mattel recall and the financial ruin of Lee Der Industrial. It has been speculated that Zhang Shuhong felt demoralised by the scandal and possibly betrayed by a close friend. Whether or not Zhang knew of the lead paint before the recall is unknown.

Zhang spent the morning of 11 August 2007, talking to some of Lee Der Industrial's 5,000 employees encouraging them to look for other jobs. He also told his managers to sell the factory's equipment. Zhang then apparently hanged himself on the third floor of one of his factories later that day. According to The New York Times, Zhang was 52 at the time of his death. A funeral was held for Zhang Shuhong on 17 August in the factory yard of the Lee Der company.

== See also ==
- 2007 Chinese export recalls
