= Chih Ree Sun =

Chinese-American physicist

- Born: May 6, 1923; Anhui, Republic of China
- Died: January 5, 2007 (aged 83); Coral Springs, Florida, U.S.
- Scientific career
- Fields: Physicist

Chih Ree Sun (Chinese: 孫志銳; pinyin: Sūn Zhìruì, May 6, 1923 – January 5, 2007) was a Chinese American physicist most noted for breaking new ground in modern physics as a professor at the State University of New York in Albany. He spent time writing Chinese poetry after he retired.

== Biography ==
=== Early years ===
Born in the Anhui province, Sun started college in Kunming, but later went to India during World War II.

He then taught and conducted research for 40 years in high-energy physics, retiring from the State University of New York at Albany in 1995 after serving on the faculty for 27 years. Sun moved to Florida the following year.

=== Arts in retirement ===
After he retired, he became an author of Chinese poetry. His love for ballroom dancing took him across Broward and Palm Beach counties.

A devoted member of the Coral Springs Chinese Cultural Association, Chih-Ree Sun also taught tai chi classes there with his wife, Felicia. He died, aged 83, after a two-year struggle with kidney and lung cancer. He was a great grandfather.

He also published a collection of more than 200 original poems shortly before he died. In one poem, he told of how his older sister gave him the last space inside a bomb shelter and waited outside while the Japanese attacked during the second Sino-Japanese war. Both survived.

Determined to help children attend Chinese school at the Chinese Cultural Association, Sun requested a scholarship fund be established in his name there. Proceeds from the book's sale will go to the scholarship fund, she said.
