= Safety Gate =

Alert system for consumer products

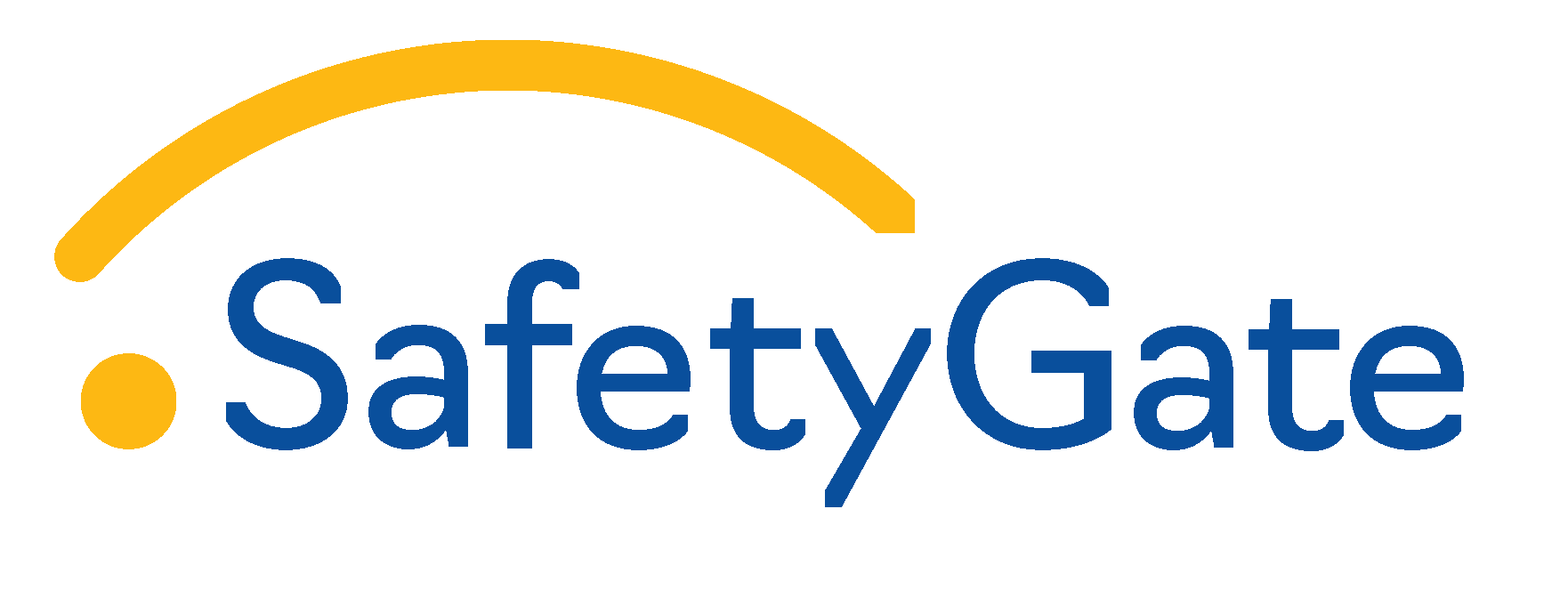

Safety Gate (formerly named Rapid Exchange of Information System or RAPEX), is the European Union rapid alert system for unsafe consumer products and consumer protection. It covers products such as clothing, shoes, cosmetics, jewelry or toys with potentially harmful ingredients or quality or even products with technical faults, electrical appliances that present an electric shock or ignition hazard. Safety Gate does not encompass food, pharmaceutical products or drugs.

Safety Gate allows a quick exchange of information on measures such as repatriation or product recalls, whether carried out by national authorities or by voluntary action of manufacturers and distributors. National authorities submit reports on measures taken against dangerous products.

The basis for the establishment of Safety Gate is the General Product Safety Directive (GPSD, Directive 2001/95/EC), an EC Directive on general product safety, which came into force on 15 January 2004.

The Directorate-General for Justice and Consumers of the European Commission publishes a weekly report on current alerts.

== History ==
During the International product safety week in 2018, RAPEX changed its name to Safety Gate.
