= Raw material =

Basic material that is used to produce other things

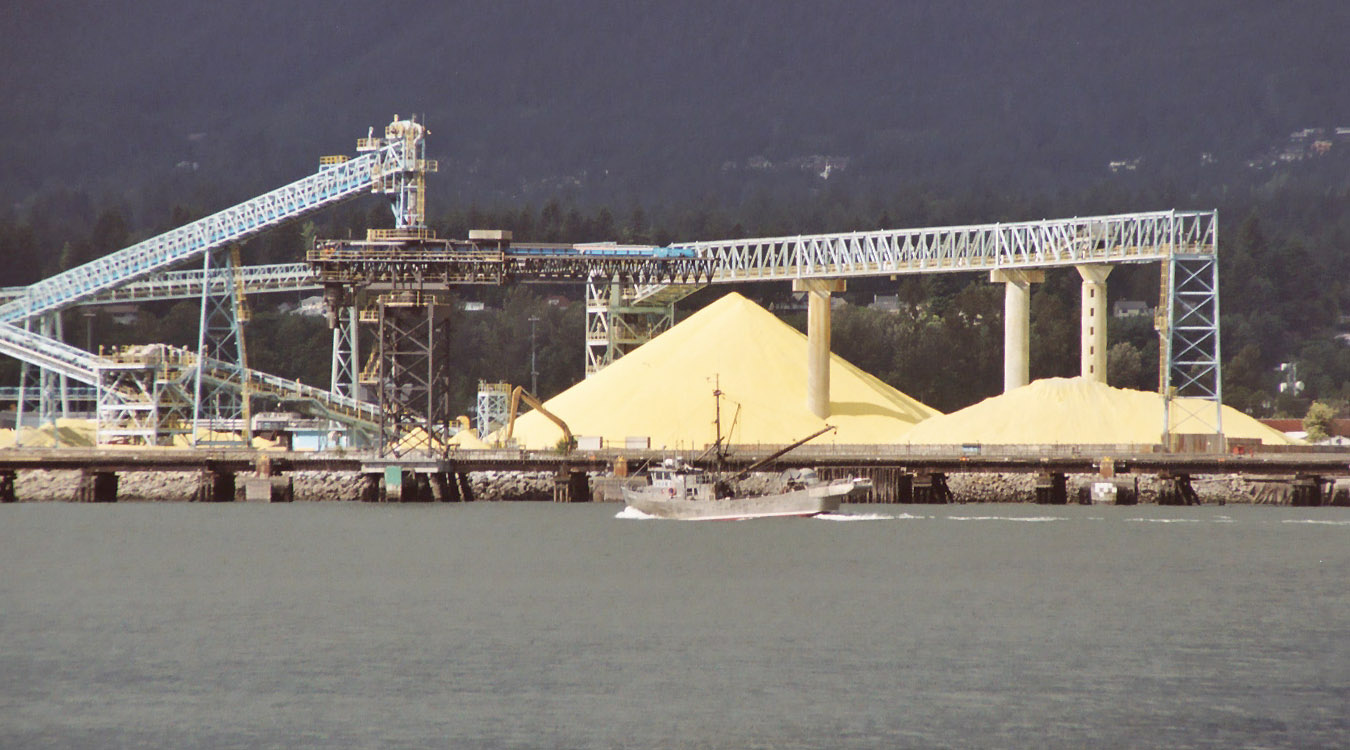
Sulfur at harbor in North Vancouver, British Columbia, ready to be loaded onto a ship

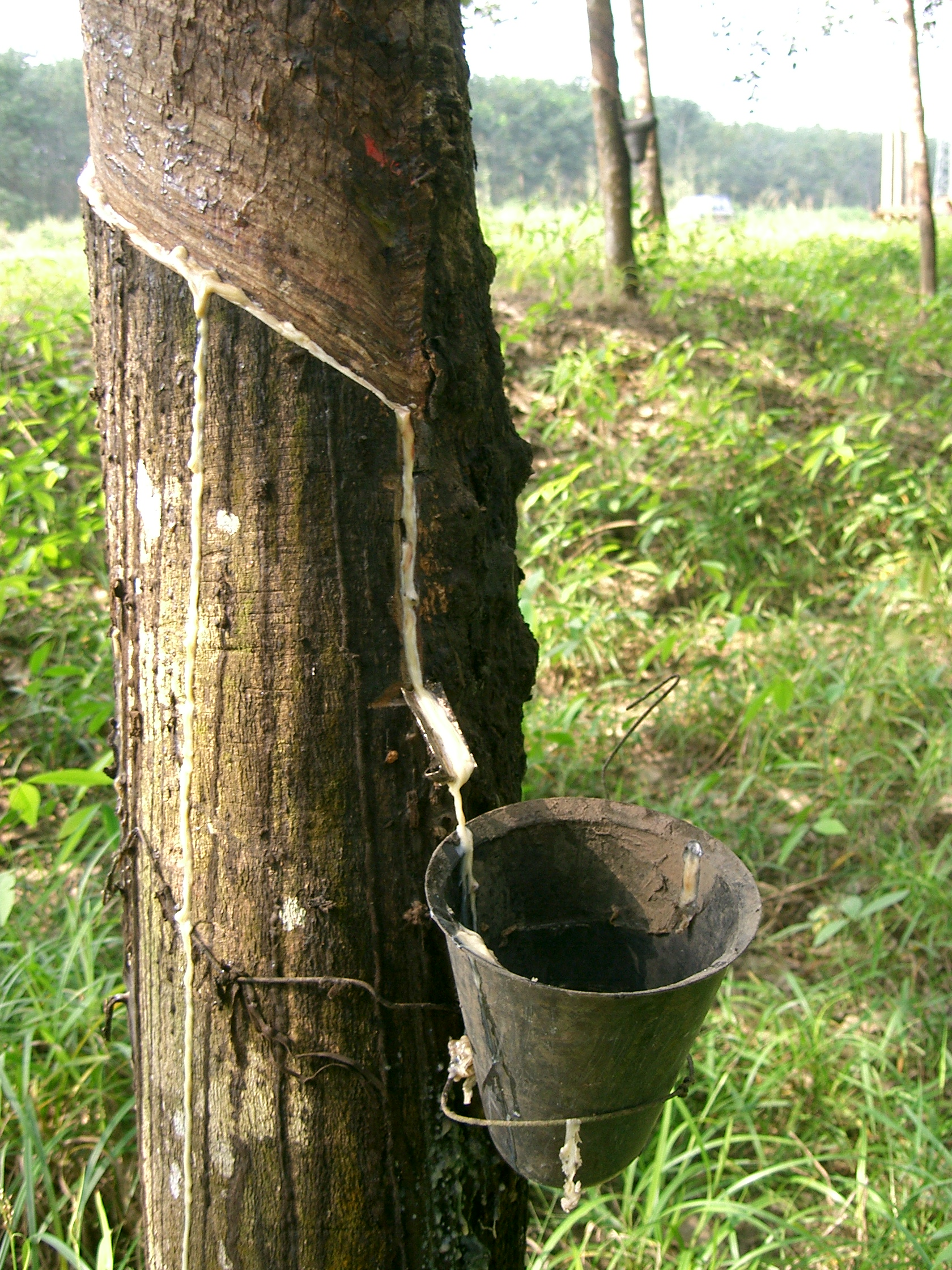
Latex being collected from a tapped rubber tree

A raw material, also known as a feedstock, unprocessed material, or primary commodity, is a basic material that is used to produce goods, finished goods, energy, or intermediate materials / intermediate goods that are feedstock for future finished products. As feedstock, the term connotes these materials are bottleneck assets and are required to produce other products.

The term raw material denotes materials in unprocessed or minimally processed states such as raw latex, crude oil, cotton, coal, raw biomass, iron ore, plastic, air, logs, and water. The term secondary raw material denotes waste material which has been recycled and injected back into use as productive material.

== Raw materials in supply chains ==
Supply chains typically begin with the acquisition or extraction of raw materials. For example, the European Commission notes that food supply chains commence in the agricultural phase of food production.

In 2014, Bob Heaney reported that on-time, full-volume raw material deliveries were among the least-tracked activities in supply chain operations. Of the senior staff surveyed by the Aberdeen Group, only 43% tracked raw material deliveries, and only 19% had automated the process.

A 2022 report on changes affecting international trade noted that improving sourcing of raw materials has become one of the main objectives of companies reconfiguring their supply chains. That same year, a survey conducted by SAP interviewed 400 US-based logistics and supply chain leaders. Of the respondents, 44% cited a lack of raw materials as a reason for their supply chain issues, and 50% expected a reduced availability of raw materials in the US to drive supply chain disruptions through 2023.

=== Raw materials markets ===
Raw materials markets are affected by consumer behavior, supply chain uncertainty, manufacturing disruptions, and regulations, amongst other factors. This results in volatile raw materials markets that are difficult to optimize and manage. Companies can struggle when faced with raw material volatility due to a lack of understanding of market demands, poor or no visibility into the indirect supply chain, and the time lag of raw materials price changes.

Volatility in the raw materials markets can also be driven by natural disasters and geopolitical conflict. The COVID-19 pandemic disrupted the steel industry, and once demand rebounded, prices increased 250% in the U.S. The Russian invasion of Ukraine caused the price of natural gas to increase by 50% in 2022.

== Raw material processing ==
=== Ceramic ===
While pottery originated in many different points around the world, it is certain that it was brought to light mostly through the Neolithic Revolution. That is important because it was a way for the first agrarians to store and carry a surplus of supplies. While most jars and pots were fire-clay ceramics, Neolithic communities also created kilns that were able to fire such materials to remove most of the water to create very stable and hard materials. Without the presence of clay on the riverbanks of the Tigris and Euphrates in the Fertile Crescent, such kilns would have been impossible for people in the region to have produced. Using these kilns, the process of metallurgy was possible once the Bronze and Iron Ages came upon the people that lived there.

=== Metallic ===
Many raw metallic materials used in industrial purposes must first be processed into a usable state. Metallic ores are first processed through a combination of crushing, roasting, magnetic separation, flotation, and leaching to make them suitable for use in a foundry. Foundries then smelt the ore into usable metal that may be alloyed with other materials to improve certain properties. One metallic raw material that is commonly found across the world is iron, and combined with nickel, this material makes up over 35% of the material in the Earth's inner and outer core. The iron that was initially used as early as 4000 BC was called meteoric iron and was found on the surface of the Earth. This type of iron came from the meteorites that struck the Earth before humans appeared, and was in very limited supply. This type is unlike most of the iron in the Earth, as the iron in the Earth was much deeper than the humans of that time period were able to excavate. The nickel content of the meteoric iron made it not necessary to be heated up, and instead, it was hammered and shaped into tools and weapons.

=== Iron ore ===
Vyasanakere Iron Ore Mine in Karnataka, India

Iron ore can be found in a multitude of forms and sources. The primary forms of iron ore today are Hematite and Magnetite. While iron ore can be found throughout the world, only the deposits in the order of millions of tonnes are processed for industrial purposes. The top five exporters of Iron ore are Australia, Brazil, South Africa, Canada, and Ukraine. One of the first sources of iron ore is bog iron. Bog iron takes the form of pea-sized nodules that are created under peat bogs at the base of mountains.

== Conflicts of raw materials ==
Places with plentiful raw materials and little economic development often show a phenomenon known as "Dutch disease" or the "resource curse", which occurs when the economy of a country is mainly based upon its exports because of its method of governance.

== See also ==
- Bulk cargo
- Bulk materials
- Bulk liquids
- Biomaterial
- Commodity
- Conflict resource
- Critical mineral raw materials
- Downcycling
- List of building materials
- Marginal factor cost
- Material passport
- Materials science
- Nature
