= European authorised representative =

Legal representative of a non-EU manufacturer in the EU

A European authorised representative (E.A.R.) is any legal or natural person who received a written mandate from a non European Union manufacturer to act on their behalf regarding their duties. The European authorised representative serves as a liaison between a non-European Union manufacturer and a national authority within the EU, to represent them in the EU and ensure their compliance with the European Directives. The CE certificate and declaration of conformity can only be issued by a company located in the European Union.

== Overview ==
Regulation of goods manufactured outside the European Union, particularly in the context of consumer product safety, led to the establishment of requirements for EU Authorized Representatives. Under the General Product Safety Regulation (GPSR, Regulation (EU) 2023/988), products marketed in the EU must include an Authorized Representative if the manufacturer is located outside the European Union, starting from the 13 December 2024. This representative acts as a contact point for competent authorities in EU member states and ensures that the product complies with applicable safety and traceability requirements.

GPSR covers only products that do not fall under other directives. As clarified in the Medical Devices Directive — Directive 93/42/EEC — it is required that alongside the CE mark all products must also have an Authorised Representative. As stated in this amendment, an Authorised Representative should serve as a contact point with the EU member states competent authorities. Medical Device Regulation ("MDR") — Regulation (EU) 2017/745 — and in vitro diagnostic Medical Device Regulation — Regulation (EU) 2017/746 — increase obligations of E.A.R in the field of surveillance of medical devices.

An E.A.R. holds the responsibility to act as a neutral party between the competent authorities and the non EU manufacturers. They must ensure the manufacturer's compliance with the conformity assessment procedure set out in the European directives which apply to the manufacture's product. The EAR must uphold dual accountability with the manufactures if problems or questions arise regarding the product. The E.A.R. must provide their contact information for the manufacturer to place on the products, allowing the E.A.R. to be the primary contact for EU authorities. The E.A.R. is the entity to which the authorities and institutions of the EU Member States may address the obligations set out in the legal requirements for medical devices. An authorised representative may also carry out a conformity assessment of a medical device on behalf of the manufacturer.

European ‘Blue Guide" describes that delegation of an authorised representative should be set out in writing (as an agreement, mandate, or power of attorney) to define contents and limits of tasks. The copy of the agreement should be sent for competent authorities upon request.

== Duties of a European Authorised Representative ==
An E.A.R. observes the manufacturer's compliance with the conformity assessment procedure set out in the European directives that apply to the product.

They ensure the law is met by having Class I and all medical devices registered with the Competent Authorities before being placed on the market.

They ensure their contact information is available to the manufactures to be placed on all the products they are representing, thus acting as a primary contact for the EU Authorities.

They must notify EU Authorities of all major incidents pertaining to the products that they represent.

An E.A.R. must understand all EU regulations from each of the EU member states as well as the four European Free Trade Association (EFTA) states, and provide notification of changes and amendments to directives that affect individual products.

They must keep the product's technical file available at any time for the EU member states authorities and maintain confidentiality with manufacturer's sensitive product information, releasing it only to the appropriate authorities when called upon.

== See also ==
- CE Mark
- Directive (European Union)
- European Union law
- EU responsible person
- Regulation (European Union)
- List of European Union directives
- Medical Devices Directive
- Medical Devices Regulation (MDR)
- In Vitro Diagnostic Medical Devices Regulation (IVDR)
