= DR-DP-Matrix =

The DR-DP-Matrix summarizes the main methods to measure delivery reliability (DR) and delivery performance (DP) within supply chains. It categorizes the methods by three criteria:

1. Type of reference: First Confirmed Date (FCD) / Last or Best Confirmed Date (LCD or BCD) / Customer Request Date (CRD)
2. Type of measurement: Volume (V) / Singular(S)
3. Type of view: On Time (T) / Delivery (D)

	Type of reference	Volume (V)	Singular (S)
$DR_{T/D}^{V/S}$	First Confirmed Date	$DR_{T}^{V}$	$DR_{D}^{S}$
$DR_{T/D}^{V/S}$	First Confirmed Date	$DR_{T}^{V}$	$DR_{T}^{S}$
$DR_{T/D}^{V/S}$	Last or Best Confirmed Date	$DR_{T}^{V}$ = CLIP or Raw CLIP	$DR_{D}^{S}$
$DR_{T/D}^{V/S}$	Last or Best Confirmed Date	$DR_{T}^{V}$ = CLIP or Raw CLIP	$DR_{T}^{S}$
$DP_{T/D}^{V/S}$	Customer Requested Date	$DP_{T}^{V}$	$DP_{D}^{S}$
$DP_{T/D}^{V/S}$	Customer Requested Date	$DP_{T}^{V}$	$DP_{T}^{S}$

== Type of reference ==
The type of reference defines against which date the actual fulfillment is measured in the calculation.

=== First Confirmed Date ===
The first confirmed date (FCD) is the committed date from the supplier in the first order promise. The result corresponds to the delivery reliability (DR).

=== Last Confirmed Date ===
The last confirmed date (LCD) is the committed date from the supplier in the last order promise. The result corresponds to the delivery reliability (DR).

=== Best Confirmed Date ===
The best confirmed date (BCD) is the committed date from the supplier in the earliest order promise. The result corresponds to the delivery reliability (DR).

=== Customer Requested Date ===
The customer request date (CRD) (or wish date) is the other possibility to measure against and is an indicator for the demand forecast accuracy and the reasonable height of safety stocks. Measuring against customer wish date corresponds to the delivery performance (DP).

== Type of measurement ==
The type of measurement distinguishes between two different ways of measurement: analog or digital. In the language of supply chain management this means volumes or singular orders.

=== Volume ===
In case the measurement is based on the volume, the percentage of the fulfilled vs. the whole demand volume within one period is calculated. Thereby also the Backlog (unfulfilled quantity) of previous periods is taken into account. This intends a usage within a supply chain part with a fixed period demand pattern (e.g. daily, weekly, ...) and a permanent material flow (e.g. between production and distribution center or subcontractor and inhouse production).

=== Singular ===
The singular approach defines single orders as object of the measurement and knows only digital values. This means the order is either fulfilled or not. Thus this approach is mainly used for end customer orders.

== Type of view ==
The type of view gives a third opportunity of diversification. It defines the point of view, in which period a singular case is taken into account. As the volume approach takes backlog and thereby the amount of lateness into account, the type of view is in most cases only applicable to the singular approach as the volume approach like CLIP are generally measured on time as demands are fitted in a fixed period demand pattern.

=== Delivery ===
One possibility to decide which singular cases are taken into account for which period is the time of delivery. This means the shipping day determines the period in which the result becomes effective. From accounting point of view this might be necessary, but it comprehends several disadvantages for the supply chain point of view, especially that the reporting of the problem is postponed to the shipping period. In case the shipment is never done, it won't be reflected in the measurement at all.

=== On Time ===
The second possibility is to trigger the measurement as soon as the reference date (wish date or first confirmed date) elapsed within a period. At the end of this period, the singular case will be judged whether it was fulfilled in time or not. This allows to have a result regarding reliability resp. performance on time (at the end of the period) when the order was due.
