= Istituto Nazionale salute Migrazioni e Povertà =

Italian public health institution

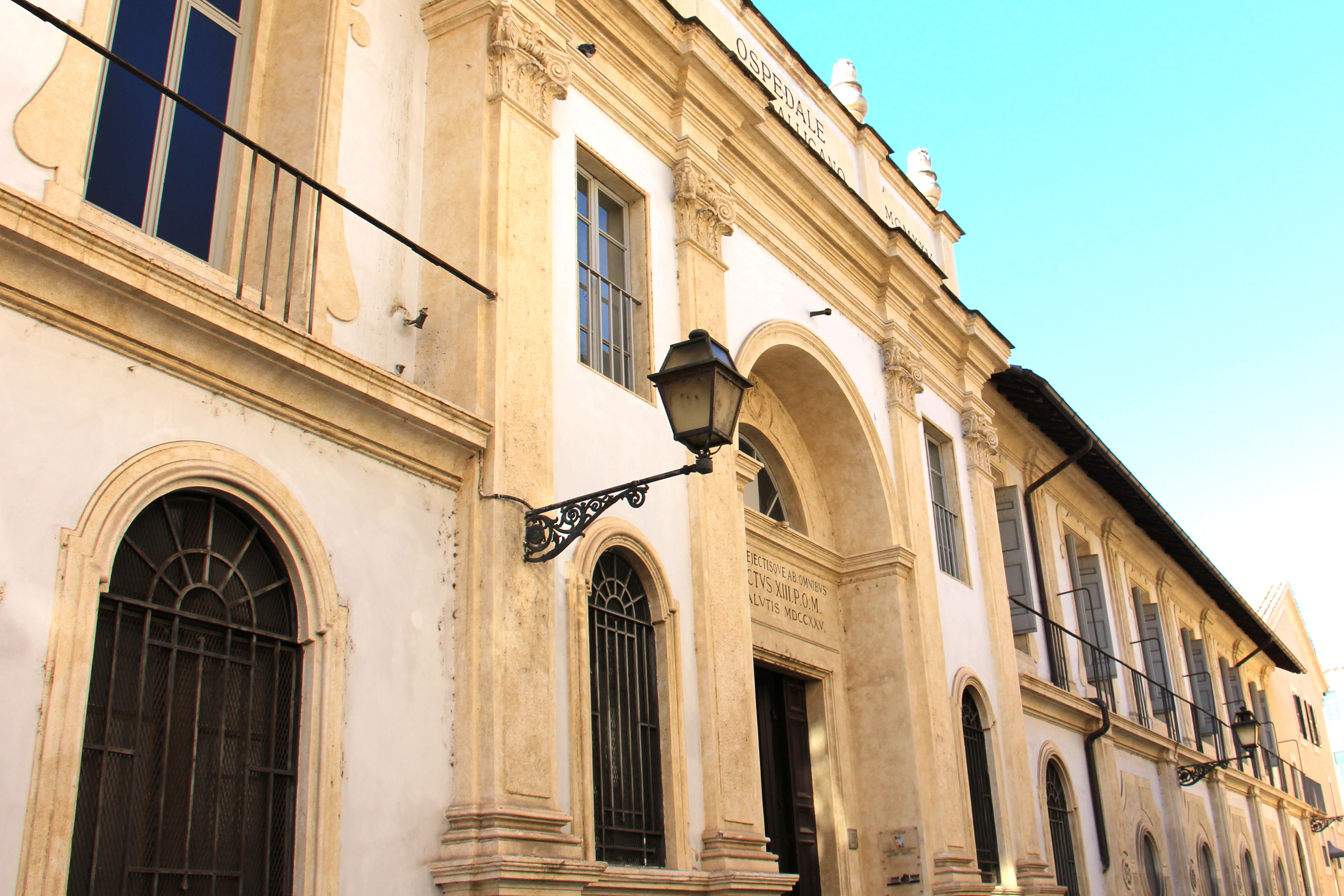
- INMP headquarters, entrance at Via di San Gallicano 25/a, in Rome's Trastevere district.

Agency overview
- Formed: 2007
- Headquarters: Rome, Italy
- Parent agency: Ministero della Salute
- Website: inmp.it

The Istituto Nazionale salute Migrazioni e Povertà, (English: National Institute for Health, Migration and Poverty), is an Italian health service agency supervised by the Ministry of Health. It was established in 2007 to address the social and health challenges faced by vulnerable populations. The Institute welcomes and treats both Italian and migrants who find themselves in serious economic and social hardship and encounter greater difficulties in accessing healthcare.

The INMP is based in Rome's San Gallicano Hospital.

== History ==
The INMP was established by decree of the Ministry of Health on August 6, 2007. Following a period of provisional operation, the institute was formally recognized and stabilized under Law No. 189/2012. It was designated as the national reference center for social and health care issues concerning migrant populations and poverty, as well as the national hub for cross-cultural mediation in the health sector. Since 2019, the INMP has also served as a WHO Collaborating Center for scientific research and capacity building in the field of migrant health.

== Structure ==
The INMP is a public law entity with legal personality, endowed with organizational, administrative, and accounting autonomy, subject to the supervision of the Ministry of Health. The Institute's governing bodies are the Steering Committee, the Director General, and the Board of Auditors. From an organizational point of view, the INMP is divided into three departments: general, health, and administrative.
