= Italian Device Registration =

The Italian Ministry of Health (MOH) has implemented mandatory procedures for the Italian registration of medical devices as of 1 May 2007.

== Overview ==
Placing a Medical Device into the European market is contingent upon compliance with the Medical Device Regulation (EU 2017/745), While this directive applies in all member states of the European Union, each member state has its own way of implementing the directive within their country, essentially adding regulations to the directive and creating local legislation.

An example of such local implementation of the Directive is now present in Italy. Italy requires, in addition to the CE marking (as opposed to the essence of the CE marking which is “Free Circulation of Goods”), that ALL Medical Devices to be placed in the Italian market will go through a Device registration process. This process is similar to the pre-market notification requirement for Class I Medical Devices (as stated in the European Directive MDD 93/42/EEC Article 14); however, in Italy it is applicable for all classes, not only Class I.

Local legislations, such as this one, are growing rapidly in Europe and strengthen the need for a professional European Authorized Representative present at all times.

There are two different registration possibilities that should not be mixed up: Basic registration of medical devices in the medial device database, and optional registration in the Repertorio to aid in marketing medical devices to the Italian National Health Service.

== Solution ==
As a non-EU manufacturer of medical devices, the manufacturer's legal representative must appoint a "responsible individual person or company" to register their product with the Italian database. The official form needed is available here:

This "responsible individual person or company" will communicate with the Italian Ministry of Health on the manufacturer's behalf. The registration can only be done with granted access to the Italian Database, and with the required “smart card” for the actual registration. The legal representative needs to have access to both.

Third party commercial entities, like distributors, should not register products for several reasons, a few of which are:

1. By allowing a third party commercial entity to register in the manufacturer's behalf, he/she relinquishes an essential part of his/her control over his/her product in Italy.
2. If the manufacturer decided to end the relationship with the commercial distributor at any point, they would be required to take their product completely off the market until they could re-register that product within Italy for a second (third, fourth, etc.) time.
3. A third party commercial entity will expect exclusivity, limiting the open distribution of the product.

== Conclusion ==
The manufacturer should register their products through their Italian distributor who is not only familiar with the language and local regulations but also has responsibility if he is the "c) other individual responsible for trading medical devices as under article 13, paragraph 2 of legislative decree no. 46 of 24 February 1997" as mentioned in the official form here:

== See also ==
- CE Mark
- Directive (European Union)
- European Union Legal System
- Regulation (European Union)
- List of European Union directives
- Medical Devices Directive
- Classificazione Nazionale dei Dispositivi medici (CND)
