= San Gallicano Hospital =

Hospital in Rome, Italy

Coordinates: 41.8886°N 12.4729°E

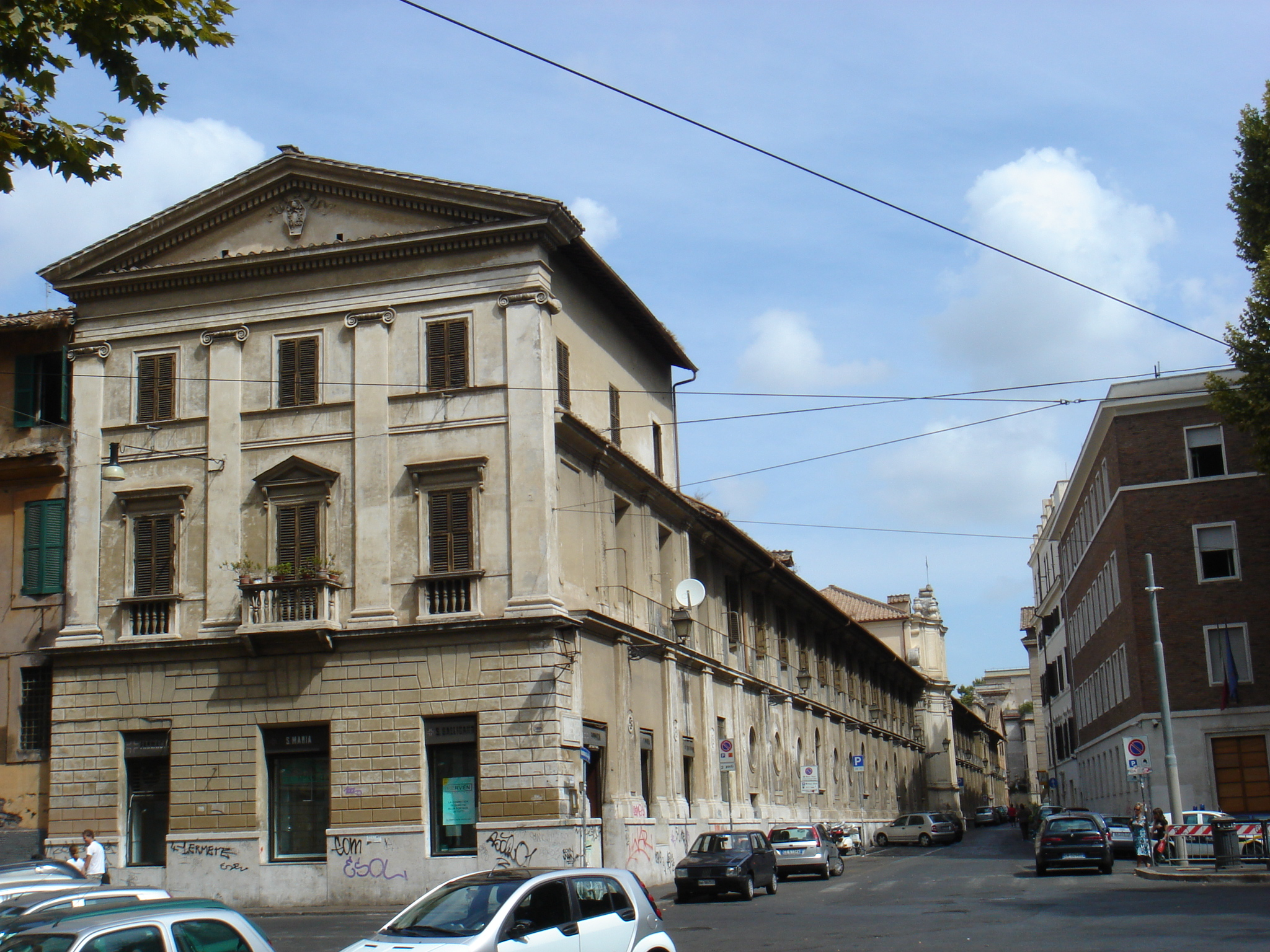
- One of the two entrances to the hospital

Geography
- Location: Rome, Italy

History
- Founded: 1726; 300 years ago

Links
- Website: inmp.it
- Lists: Hospitals in Italy

The Hospital of Santa Maria and San Gallicano, more commonly known as San Gallicano, is a building constructed in Rome between the end of 1724 and 1726 on the occasion of the Jubilee Year of 1725.

== History ==
The structure was commissioned in 1724 by Pope Benedict XIII, and is the last of Rome's five historic hospitals. The hospital project was first entrusted to Lorenzo Possenti, who was later appointed as technician and construction manager, and then to architect Filippo Raguzzini, who completed the project with the task of building a hospital in the already partially built area of the XIII district of Trastevere.

The work proceeded rapidly; the first stone was laid on March 14, 1725, while the church was consecrated by Benedict XIII on October 6, 1726, as recorded on the plaque inside the church itself and as testified by the diary of Don Emilio Lami, although in reality the actual opening to patients took place two days later, on October 8.

On the same day, the decree of foundation was issued, with the bull Bonus Ille, which explained the purpose and functioning of the structure and appointed Cardinal Pier Marcellino Corradini as protector and Don Lami as prior. Commemorative medals were also minted and a marble plaque was placed at the entrance on Piazza Romana, which is currently located in the atrium as a testimony to the foundation.

== Structure ==
The architectural structure has a strongly longitudinal layout, with the church at its center, which is the fulcrum of two long corridors, approximately nine meters high, at the ends of which are the protruding volumes of the service areas and servants' quarters. The function of the church, located at the center of the corridors, was to divide the long infirmary into two sub-corridors, one for men and one for women.

The typological scheme fits, albeit with particularly large dimensions, into the more general Roman hospital tradition of longitudinal aisles and an adjoining church. The real typological innovation is precisely the large longitudinal development, which implies the need to articulate and characterize the external façades, and in particular the façade on Vicolo delle Fratte, where all the decorative elements are concentrated, starting from the convex façade of the church, compared to the side façades.

The hospital facilities also included an apothecary and an anatomical theater built in 1826 by Leo XII.

Authoritative sources (Argan) indicate San Gallicano as an exemplary case in the field of sanitary engineering evolution, so much so that it was considered the best of its kind in Europe at that time. In 1932, the ISG and the Regina Elena Institute (IRE) were merged under a single administrative body, the “Istituti Fisioterapici Ospitalieri” (IFO). Over the years, the historic building in Trastevere was abandoned by the traditional public institute.

It is currently the headquarters of the Community of Sant'Egidio and the INMP, a public body of the national health service, established in 2007 to address the social and health challenges faced by the most vulnerable populations and supervised by the Ministry of Health.
