= Regulatory translation =

Translation of medical regulatory documentation

Regulatory translation is the translation of documentation pertaining to the approval and compliance of medical devices, pharmaceuticals and in vitro diagnostics products. Many countries around the world, including Japan and the United States, require that approval dossiers for new products be submitted in local languages for the regulatory bodies to read and analyze. Similarly, any documentation associated with follow-up changes to approved products or reporting of field issues must be translated for countries that require it.

Aside from linguistic skills, regulatory translation requires specific training and subject matter knowledge in order to translate medical and regulatory content. This is because of the highly technical, sensitive and regulated nature of medical texts as well as the strict adherence to terminology required for some countries. Regulatory translation also requires specific knowledge of the document templates required for different countries' dossier formats. Because approval dossiers are often composed of a variety of different document types, such as CAD drawings, spreadsheets, scanned patient signatures as well as word processed expository sections, the translation process can be more difficult than other types of medical translation.

== Examples of regulatory texts ==
Some examples of the types of regulatory documents requiring translation include (but are not limited to):

- Manufacturing procedures for medical devices or drugs
- Design specifications and drawings
- Risk assessments
- CMC documentation
- Bio-compatibility reports
- Regulatory approval dossiers
- Clinical trial documentation – informed consent forms, case report forms, protocols
- Instructions for Use for drugs or medical devices

== Process ==
Because regulatory translation is typically a multi-step process, it is usually carried out by a translation agency which oversees all project management and the linguistic team. Steps in the process can include:

- Extraction of text from source format
- Translation – the conversion of the source language text to the target language text
- Editing – reading and revision by a separate person to assure adherence to approved terminology and the proper style and voice.
- Publishing – the translation is put back into the original format (e.g., Word document, Web page, e-learning program)
- Proofreading – this ensures that the formatted translation displays correctly with no corrupted text, has proper punctuation and line and page breaks are correct.
- In-country review – a native-speaking expert reviews the translation.
