= Lithium iron phosphate battery =

Type of rechargeable battery without cobalt

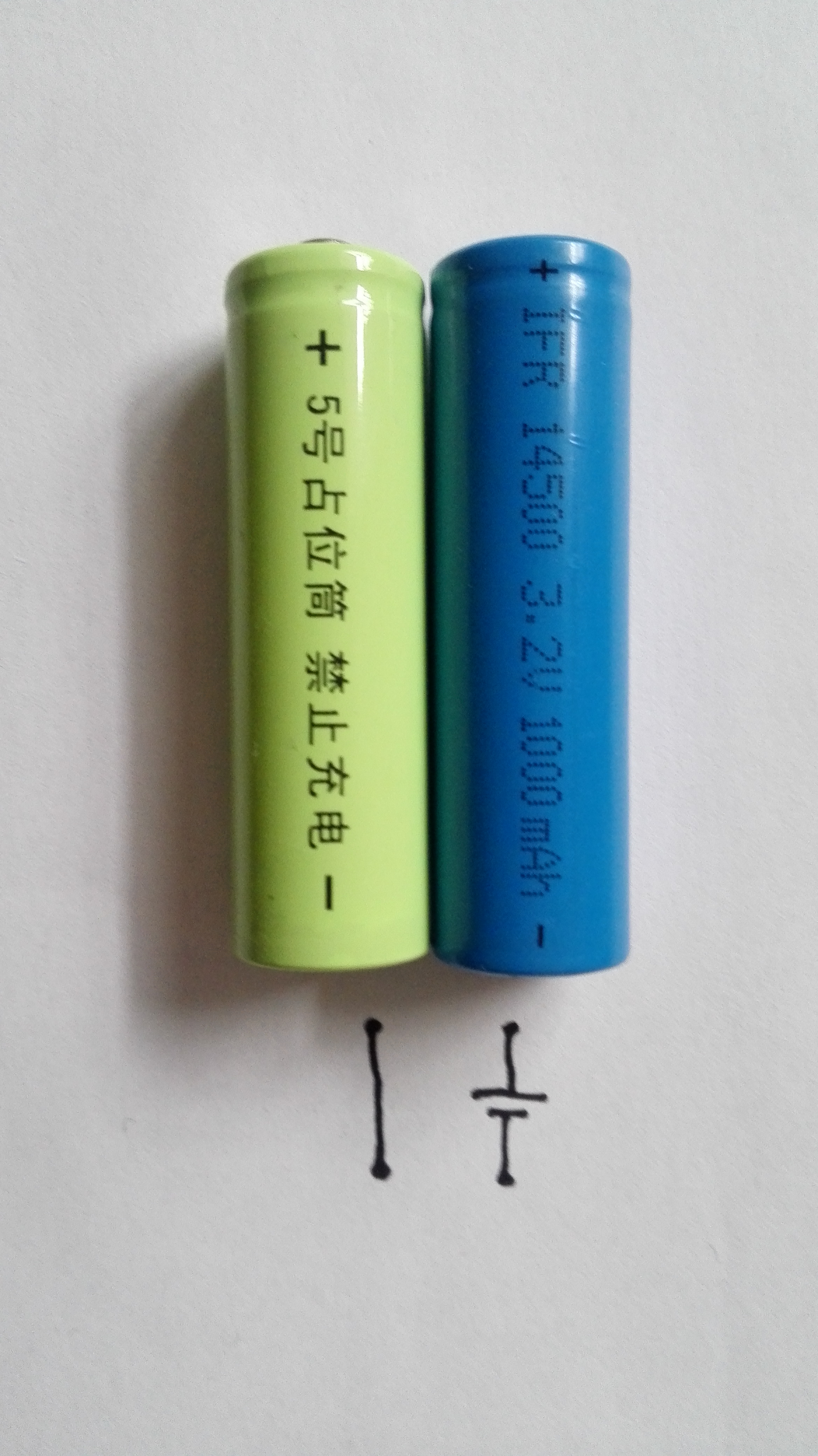
- A lithium iron phosphate (LiFePO_{4}) 14500 battery (right) shown next to a battery placeholder (left)
- Specific energy: 95–172 W⋅h/kg (340–620 kJ/kg); Next gen: 180–205 Wh/kg
- Energy density: 227–396 W⋅h/L (820–1,430 kJ/L)
- Specific power: Up to 2,400 W/kg
- Energy/consumer-price: 1–4 Wh/US$
- Time durability: > 10 years
- Cycle durability: 2,500–9,000 cycles
- Nominal cell voltage: 3.2 V

The lithium iron phosphate battery (LiFePO_{4} battery) or LFP battery (lithium ferrophosphate) is a type of lithium-ion battery using lithium iron phosphate (LiFePO_{4}) as the cathode material, and a graphitic carbon electrode with a metallic backing as the anode. Because of their low cost, high safety, low toxicity, long cycle life and other factors, LFP batteries are finding a number of roles in vehicle use, utility-scale stationary applications, and backup power. As of September 2022, LFP type battery market share for EVs reached 31%, and of that, 68% were from EV makers Tesla and BYD alone.

In 2022, Chinese manufacturers held a near-monopoly of LFP battery type production. With patents having started to expire in 2022 and the increased demand for cheaper EV batteries, LFP type production is expected to rise further and surpass lithium nickel manganese cobalt oxides (NMC) type batteries.

The specific energy of LFP batteries is lower than that of other common lithium-ion battery types such as nickel manganese cobalt (NMC) and nickel cobalt aluminum (NCA). As of 2024, the specific energy of CATL's LFP battery is claimed to be 205 watt-hours per kilogram (Wh/kg) on the cell level. BYD's LFP battery specific energy is 150 Wh/kg. The best NMC batteries exhibit specific energy values of over 300 Wh/kg. Notably, the specific energy of Panasonic's "2170" NCA batteries used in Tesla's 2020 Model 3 mid-size sedan is around 260 Wh/kg, which is 70% of its "pure chemicals" value. LFP batteries also have a lower operating voltage than other lithium-ion battery types.

== Specifications ==
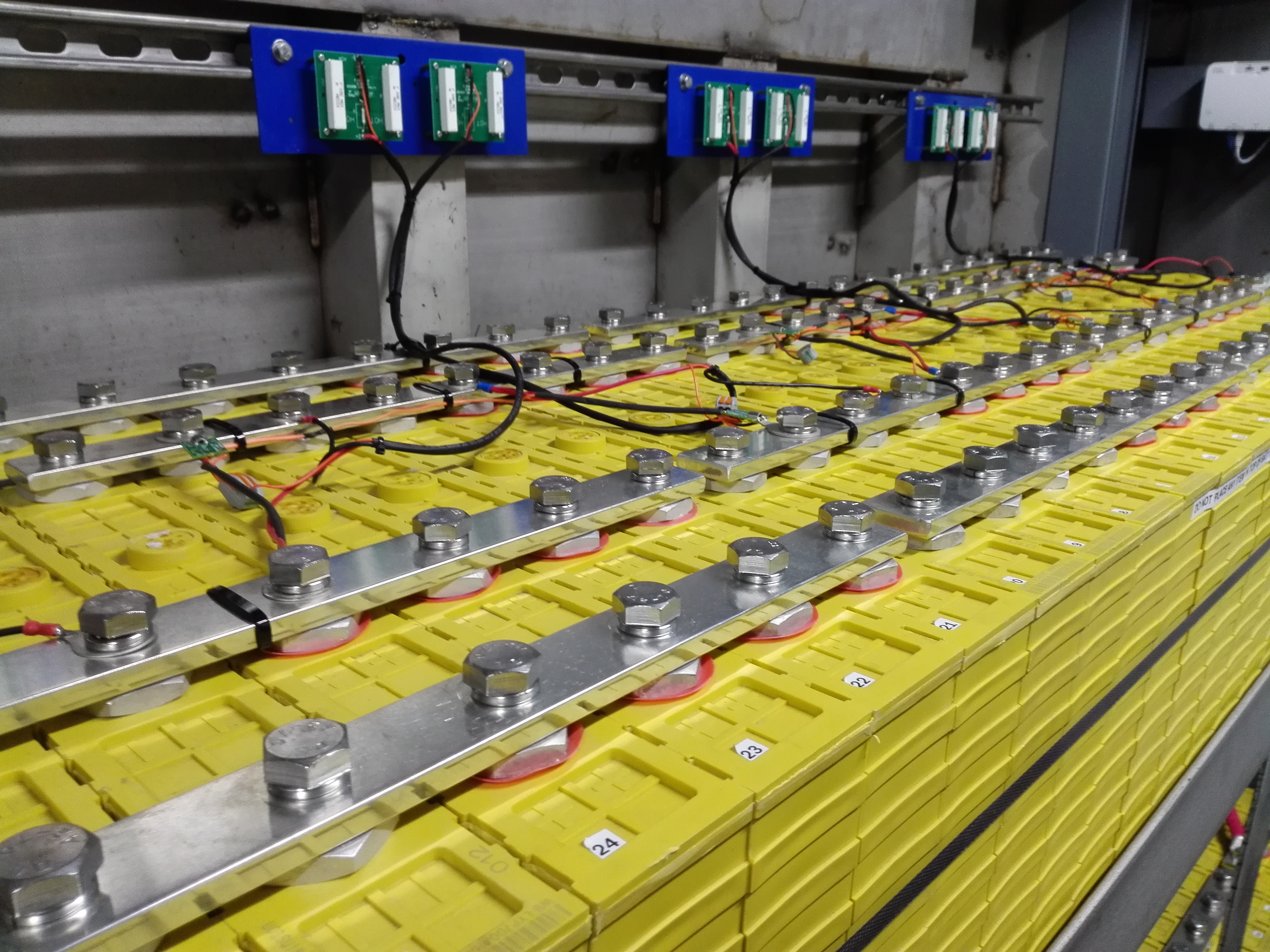
Multiple lithium iron phosphate modules wired in series and parallel to create a 2800 Ah 52 V battery module. Total battery capacity is 145.6 kWh. Note the large, solid tinned copper busbar connecting the modules. This busbar is rated for 700 ampere DC to accommodate the high currents generated in this 48 volt DC system.

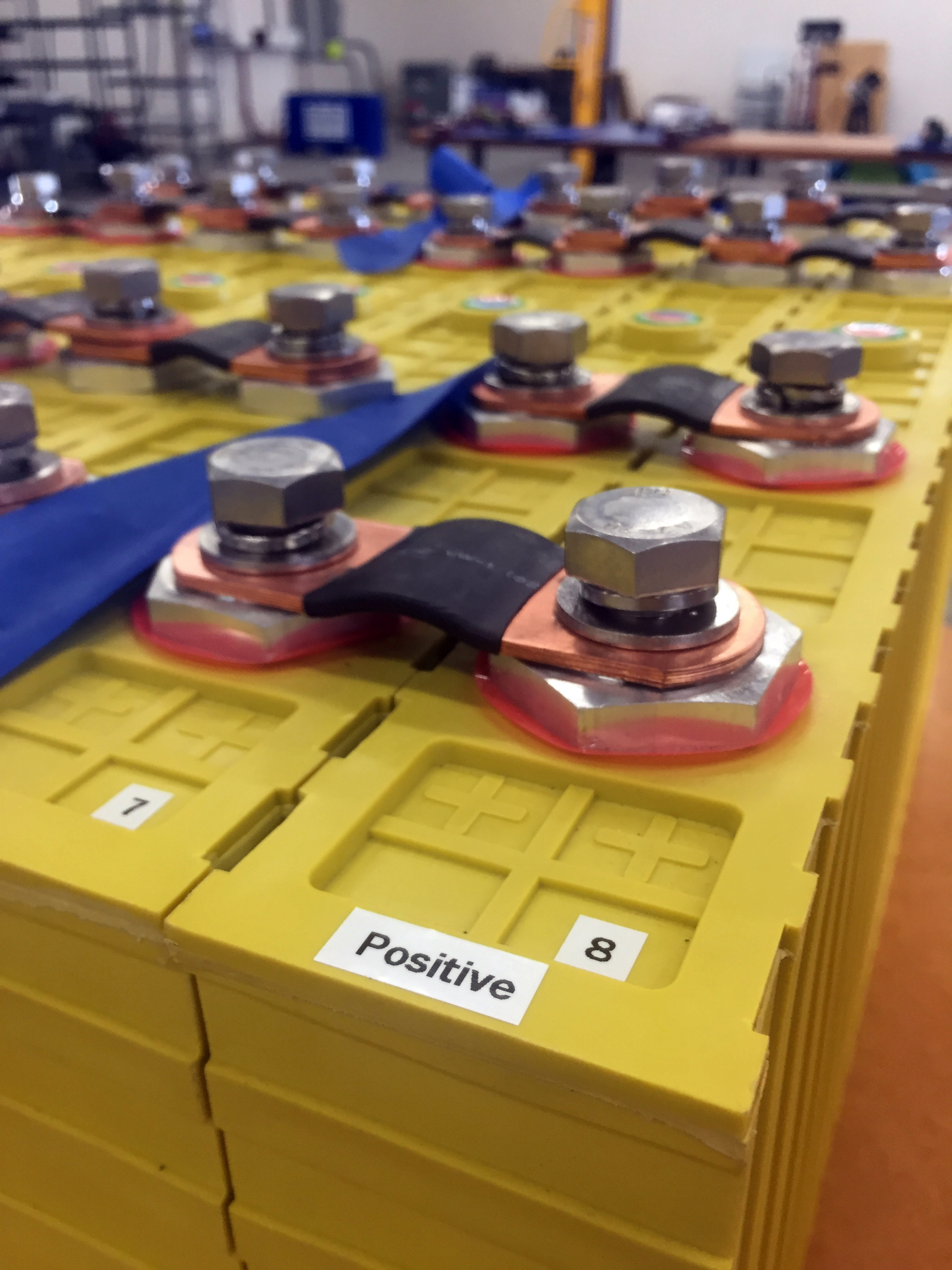
Lithium iron phosphate modules, each 700 Ah, 3.25 V. Two modules are wired in parallel to create a single 3.25 V 1400 Ah battery pack with a capacity of 4.55 kWh.

- Cell voltage
  - Minimum discharge voltage = 2.0–2.8 V
  - Working voltage = 3.0 ~ 3.3 V
  - Max viable voltage = 2.5 ~ 3.47 V
  - Maximum charge voltage = 3.60–3.65 V
- Gravimetric energy density = 95–172 W⋅h/kg (340–620 kJ/kg). The latest version announced at the end of 2023, early 2024 made significant improvements in energy density from 180 up to 205 Wh/kg without increasing production costs.
- Volumetric energy density = 227–396 W⋅h/L (820–1,430 kJ/L)
- Cycle life from 2,500 to more than 9,000 cycles depending on conditions. Next generation high-energy density versions have increased charging lifecycles, probably around 15,000 maximum cycles.

== Comparison with other battery types ==
LFP batteries use a lithium-ion-derived chemistry and share many of the advantages and disadvantages of other lithium-ion chemistries. However, there are significant differences.

=== Resource availability ===
Iron and phosphates are very common in the Earth's crust. LFP contains neither nickel nor cobalt, both of which are supply-constrained and expensive. As with lithium, human rights and environmental concerns have been raised concerning the use of cobalt. Environmental concerns have also been raised regarding the extraction of nickel.

=== Cost ===
A 2020 report published by the Department of Energy compared the costs of large-scale energy storage systems built with LFP vs NMC. It found that the price per kWh of LFP batteries was about 6% lower than that of NMC batteries, and it projected that LFP cells would last about 67% longer (i.e., more cycles). Because of differences between the cell's characteristics, the cost of some other components of the storage system would be somewhat higher for LFP, but on balance it remains less costly per kWh than NMC.

In 2020, the lowest reported LFP cell prices were $80/kWh (12.5 Wh/$) with an average price of $137/kWh, while in 2023 the average price had dropped to $100/kWh. By early 2024, VDA-sized LFP cells were available for less than RMB 0.5/Wh ($70/kWh), while Chinese automaker Leapmotor stated it buys LFP cells at RMB 0.4/Wh ($56/kWh) and believe they could drop to RMB 0.32/Wh ($44/kWh). By mid 2024, assembled LFP batteries were available to consumers in the US for around $115/kWh.

=== Better aging and cycle-life characteristics ===
LFP chemistry offers a considerably longer cycle life than other lithium-ion chemistries. Under most conditions, it supports more than 3,000 cycles; under optimal conditions, more than 10,000 cycles. NMC batteries support about 1,000 to 2,300 cycles, depending on conditions. A 2024 study in the Journal of The Electrochemical Society demonstrated that operating LFP cells at lower average states of charge significantly mitigates capacity degradation caused by lithium inventory loss and iron dissolution, extending operational lifespan in stationary grid storage applications.

LFP cells experience a slower rate of capacity loss (a.k.a. greater calendar-life) than lithium-ion battery chemistries such as cobalt (LiCoO_{2}), manganese spinel (LiMn_{2}O_{4}), lithium-ion polymer batteries (LiPo battery) or lithium-ion batteries.

=== Viable alternative to lead-acid batteries ===
Because of the nominal 3.2 V output, four cells can be connected in series for a nominal 12.8 V. This comes close to the nominal voltage of a six-cell lead-acid batteries. Along with the good safety characteristics of LFP batteries, this makes LFP a good potential replacement for lead-acid batteries in applications such as automotive and solar applications, provided the charging systems are adapted not to damage the LFP cells through excessive charging voltages (beyond 3.6 volts DC per cell while under charge), temperature-based voltage compensation, equalisation attempts or continuous trickle charging. The LFP cells must be at least balanced initially before the pack is assembled and a protection system also needs to be implemented to ensure no cell can be discharged below a voltage of 2.5 V or severe damage will occur in most instances, due to irreversible deintercalation of LiFePO_{4} into FePO_{4}.

=== Safety ===
One important advantage of LiFePO_{4} over other lithium-ion chemistries is thermal and chemical stability, which contributes to improved battery safety. Especially compared to layered oxide cathode materials such as lithium cobalt oxide (LiCoO_{2}) and NMC, which release oxygen upon heating, LFP generally has higher decomposition temperatures.

There is a significant safety property to LFP batteries; in a stable active condition the chemical composition does not combust when exposed to normal ambient air, it is less prone to causing a fire and considered incombustible, with good overall thermal and chemical stability. However, LFP batteries can unfortunately still catch fire under extreme conditions similar to many other types of batteries, from causes such as overcharging issues, very high thermal temperatures, or catastrophic physical damage.

=== Lower energy density ===
The energy density (energy/volume) of a new LFP battery as of 2008 was about 14% lower than that of a new LiCoO_{2} battery. Since discharge rate is a percentage of battery capacity, a higher rate can be achieved by using a larger battery (more ampere hours) if low-current batteries must be used.

=== State of charge estimation challenges ===
A primary operational challenge with LFP batteries is accurately estimating their state of charge (SOC). LFP cells exhibit an exceptionally flat open-circuit voltage (OCV) plateau between roughly 20% and 80% SOC, meaning the cell voltage remains nearly constant across most of its working range. This characteristic makes traditional voltage-based estimation unreliable, causing standard battery management systems (BMS) to suffer from cumulative measurement drift over time.

This diagnostic and tracking limitation can be mitigated through online passive electrochemical impedance spectroscopy (passive EIS) inspections. While traditionally used for laboratory testing, adaptive passive EIS frameworks like those implemented in CellPassport allow for continuous internal parameter tracking during active deployment. The utility of online passive EIS in operating profiles has similarly been demonstrated in tracking the state and aging behavior of other high-power lithium-based systems under real-world vehicle dynamic loads.

== Uses ==
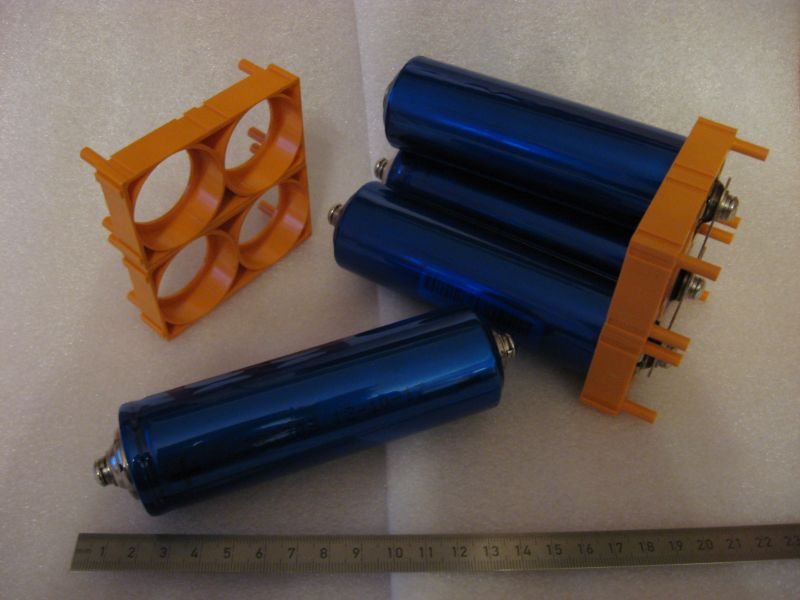
LFP cells in a homemade battery pack

=== Stationary storage ===
LFP batteries are common in stationary storage systems due to advantages in cost, safety and cycle life. In 2025, LFP batteries held an approximate 85% of the stationary storage market share. In static applications, the lower energy density of LFP compared to other lithium ion chemistries is a less of a disadvantage.

=== Electric vehicles ===
LFP batteries are used in many electric vehicles due to their cost, thermal stability and longevity. However, higher end vehicles typically use NMC chemistries due to their higher performance. In 2025, the GWh market share for LFP batteries in passenger cars and light vehicles was 79% in China, 13% in Europe, 5% in North America and 57% in the rest of the world.

In September 2022, LFP batteries had a 31% market share of the EV battery market. Of that share, 68% was deployed by two companies, Tesla and BYD.

==== Examples ====
- Chevrolet used a 21.3 kWh LFP battery in the 2014 model year Spark EV. The battery cells were manufactured by A123 Systems.
- Renault uses a 27.5 kWh LFP battery in the electric-only fourth generation Twingo, sold from 2026.
- Tesla Motors uses LFP batteries in all standard-range Models 3 and Y made after October 2021 except for standard-range vehicles made with 4680 cells starting in 2022, which use an NMC chemistry.

=== Other uses ===
Some electronic cigarettes use these types of batteries. Other applications include marine electrical systems and propulsion, flashlights, radio-controlled models, portable motor-driven equipment, amateur radio equipment, industrial sensor systems and emergency lighting.

== History ==
LiFePO_{4} is a natural mineral known as triphylite. Arumugam Manthiram and John B. Goodenough first identified the polyanion class of cathode materials for lithium ion batteries. LiFePO_{4} was then identified as a cathode material belonging to the polyanion class for use in batteries in 1996 by Padhi et al. Reversible extraction of lithium from LiFePO_{4} and insertion of lithium into FePO_{4} was demonstrated. Because of its low cost, non-toxicity, the natural abundance of iron, its excellent thermal stability, safety characteristics, electrochemical performance, and specific capacity (170 mA·h/g, or 610 C/g) it has gained considerable market acceptance.

The main obstacle to commercialization was its intrinsically low electrical conductivity. This problem was overcome by reducing the particle size, coating the LiFePO_{4} particles with conductive materials such as carbon nanotubes, or both. Michel Armand and his coworkers at Hydro-Québec and the Université de Montréal developed this approach in 2015. Another approach by Yet Ming Chiang's group at MIT consisted of doping LFP with cations of materials such as aluminium, niobium, and zirconium.

Negative electrodes (anode, on discharge) made of petroleum coke were used in early lithium-ion batteries; later types used natural or synthetic graphite.

== See also ==
- List of battery types
- List of battery sizes
- List of electric-vehicle-battery manufacturers
- Comparison of commercial battery types
- Nanowire battery
- Phosphate
- Power-to-weight ratio
- Solid-state battery
- Super-iron battery
- Blade battery
