= Delivery Performance =

Delivery performance (DP) is a broadly used standard KPI measurement in supply chains to measure the fulfillment of a customer's demand to the wish date. Following the nomenclature of the DR-DP-Matrix three main approaches to measure DP can be distinguished:

- $DP_{T}^{V}$
- $DP_{D}^{S}$
- $DP_{T}^{S}$

Type of measurement: volume (V)/singular(S)
Type of view: on time (T)/ delivery (D)

== Volume/on time ==
=== Formula ===
If ($(Demand_{p,c} + Backlog_{p-1,c})>0$)

$DP_{T}^{V}$ = $\frac{Delivered_{p,c} + Predelivery_{p-1,c}}{Demand_{p,c} + Backlog_{p-1,c}}$

Else

NULL

Demand:= customers wish c:= product identifier p:= Time period e.g. a day, a week, a month ...

The cumulation over a period and a group of product identifiers c is done as follows: $DP_{p,c} = \frac{\sum_{p,c}(DP_{T}^{V})}{count_{p,c}(DP_{T}^{V}<>NULL)}$

whereas p is determined by demand period

== Singular/delivery and singular/on time ==
=== Singular case definition ===
To fit to the needs of the environment, the granularity of a singular case ($DP_{*}^{S}$) has to be defined. In general a singular case is described by a n-Tuple consisting of a set of the following order and delivery details:

- order number
- customer identifier
- product identifier
- wish date of customer
- confirmed date of supplier
- ship to information
- delivery date
- delivery note number

=== Formula ===
- $DP_{D}^{S}$

After a singular case has been delivered to the customer its DP is measured as follows:

If (wish date = arrival date) then

DP_{singular case}=1

else

DP_{singular case}=0

arrival date = delivery date + transit time

By cumulating the results of singular cases over a certain period p and, if necessary, additional criteria c (e.g. customer, product, ...) the delivery performance is calculated as follows:

$DP_{p,c} = \frac{\sum_{p,c}(DP)}{count_{p,c}(singular cases)}$

whereas p is determined by the arrival date

- $DP_{T}^{S}$

After a period has elapsed all singular cases with wish date within period are considered and their DP is measured as follows:

If (wish date = arrival date) then

DR_{singular case}=1

else

DR_{singular case}=0

arrival date = delivery date + transit time

By cumulating the results of singular cases over a certain period p and, if necessary, additional criteria c (e.g. customer, product, ...) the delivery performance is calculated as follows:

$DP_{p,c} = \frac{\sum_{p,c}(DP)}{count_{p,c}(singular cases)}$

whereas p is determined by the first confirmed date

== Result ==
0%≤$DP_{T/D}^{S/V}$≤100%

== See also ==
- Delivery reliability
