= Produce traceability =

Produce traceability makes it possible to track produce from its point of origin to a retail location where it is purchased by consumers.

Produce traceability is an important link in protecting public health since it allows health agencies to more quickly and accurately identify the source of contaminated fruit or vegetables believed to be the cause of an outbreak of foodborne illness, remove them from the marketplace, and communicate to the supply chain.

Since many fruits and vegetables are eaten raw, the produce industry‚ from farmer to retailer, works diligently to protect these foods from contamination. Despite their best efforts, foreign matter can occasionally contaminate produce in the field or orchard, in packing or processing, in transit or storage. Controlled cold chains are frequently used.

Because traceability systems can provide information on the source, location, movement and storage conditions of produce, they also allow growers, packers, processors and distributors to identify factors affecting quality and delivery.

Beginning in 2008, an industry-led effort to enhance traceability throughout the entire produce supply chain was launched as the Produce Traceability Initiative.

== Trends in outbreaks of produce-related illness ==
An analysis of 3,500 food-poisoning outbreaks between 1990 and 2003 found that contaminated produce was responsible for the greatest number of individual foodborne illnesses. The study, by the Center for Science in the Public Interest, found that produce caused 428 outbreaks and 23,857 cases of illness.

Authorities note that several factors have contributed to the rise in outbreaks:

- Great consumption of fresh produce, especially cut fruits and vegetables.
- Wider distribution.
- Improved electronic reporting of outbreaks.
- An aging population more susceptible to foodborne illness.
- Unlike meat, which can be rid of bacteria through proper cooking, fresh produce is often meant to be consumed raw.

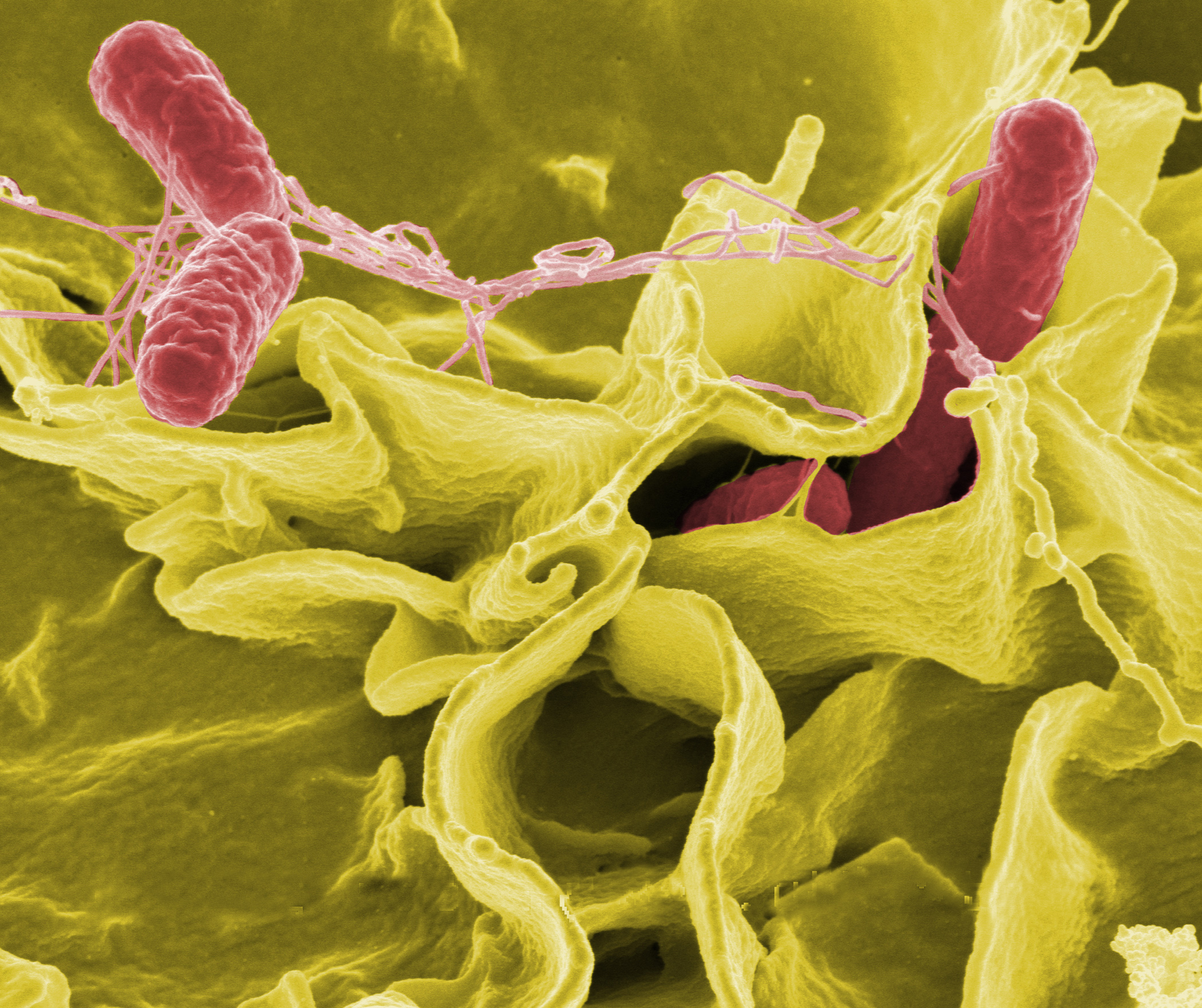
Salmonella is a common source of foodborne illness.

The U.S. Food and Drug Administration noted in 2007 that fruit and vegetable-related outbreaks of food poisoning are on the rise and had struck in spinach, tomatoes, lettuce and cantaloupes. The agency urged fruit and vegetable processors to adopt food safety plans similar to those in the meat industry.

An outbreak of Salmonella Saintpaul in 2008 was characterized by the US Center for Disease Control as the largest foodborne outbreak in a decade. Some 1304 infected persons were identified in 43 states, at least 252 were hospitalized and two deaths were possibly linked to the outbreak. CDC noted that the trace back of fresh produce, such as tomatoes, through the supply chain could be very difficult and labor-intensive. Ironically, the carrier item was ultimately determined to be jalapeño peppers, not tomatoes.

== Benefits ==
Tracing of an item through various stages of production, manufacturing, processing, handling, transportation, sales and consumption is a widespread practice in today's world. Manufacturers may require purchasers to register ownership of a product to facilitate possible future recall for safety reasons or warranty fulfillment. The Post Office and package delivery companies make widespread use of tracking packages from pickup to delivery, even to destinations on the other side of the world.Some often-recognized benefits of traceability include:

- Ability to determine the origin of a product, ingredient or component.
- Simplifies problem-solving in event of defective or contaminated product, ingredient or component.
- Allows issues to be more quickly identified, contained and resolved.
- Limits losses and lowers costs.
- Protects public health and safety.
- Builds trust and confidence in affected products, businesses or systems.
- Verifies that produce is locally grown.
- Improves operating efficiencies for growers, packers and shippers.

== Voluntary industry initiatives ==
In 1930, produce industry leaders sponsored legislation to require an internal trail of accounting between buyers and sellers along the entire produce marketing chain. This law, the Perishable Agricultural Commodities Act (PACA) of 1930, set the foundation for basic traceability. More recently, the Bioterrorism Act of 2002 required food companies to keep records that could be traced in the produce supply chain (i.e.one step up and one step back). Based on these records, many organizations in the fresh produce distribution chain have long maintained the ability to trace products inside their enterprise. In simple terms, they know where they got it and where they sent it, but with products that may move through multiple parties who may transform or comingle them, trying to connect many links quickly in time of crisis is a challenge.

Some 30 years ago, manufacturers and retailers created an organization called GS1 to improve the efficiency of the distribution of food and consumer goods to supermarkets. One of its many programs was to develop the now-familiar bar code on products that can be scanned at checkout by retailers. GS1‚international standards will provide the foundation for the PTI.

Multiple shippers, distributors and retailers in the produce industry have endorsed the Produce Traceability Initiative (PTI) to encourage adoption of whole chain traceability. The initiative's sponsor associations include United Fresh Produce Association (United Fresh), Canadian Produce Marketing Association (CPMA) and Produce Marketing Association (PMA). Both internal and external traceability programs are needed in order to effectively track and trace product up and down the supply chain, achieving whole-chain traceability. At present, most companies have internal traceability programs but not external traceability. The PTI outlines a six-step course of action to achieve chain-wide adoption of electronic traceability of every case produce by the year 2012. Meanwhile, companies are putting into operation technologies that will support the PTI.

== Legislative and regulatory matters ==
Traceability of food is legally required in the European Union (Regulation 178/2002) with dedicated initiatives in EU countries and the UK and Northern Ireland.

In the EU, under the renewed Sustainable Product Policy Initiative, the inclusion of a Digital Product Passport has been proposed. The EU sustainable product policy was renewed in function of the European Green Deal and the new Circular Economy Action Plan. and revises the Ecodesign Directive. As such, similarly to material passports, it intents to assist the circular economy.

In the United States, various government agencies have oversight or regulatory control over different aspects of fresh fruit and produce production, processing and distribution. These include the U.S. Department of Agriculture, the U.S. Food and Drug Administration (FDA) and the Centers for Disease Control. Some groups have pushed for a single food-safety agency, on-farm improvements and improved reporting and surveillance of foodborne illness outbreaks.

The draft Food Safety Enhancement Act of 2009 was introduced May 27, 2009, in the U.S. House of Representatives. It would expand FDA authority, require registration of food manufacturers and processors, regulate crop cultivation and harvesting and other measures. After committee hearings and extensive amendment, the bill (HR2749) passed the House on July 30, 2009. HR2749 does not specifically endorse the PTI, or prescribe a traceability method or methodology, but instead Section 107 calls for regulations establishing a tracing system that includes:

1. the establishment and maintenance of lot numbers;
2. a standardized format for pedigree information; and
3. the use of a common nomenclature for food

with a goal of identifying each person who grows, produces, manufactures, processes, packs, transports, holds, or sells food in as short a timeframe as practicable but no longer than 2 business days. The measure has since died in the Senate.

In parallel, the White House created a Food Safety Working Group which has issued statements calling for a national traceability system that would enhance traceability of all food, but without specifically endorsing a particular approach.

== Technology ==
Radio-frequency identification and barcodes (including QR-codes) are two common technology methods used to deliver traceability. The blockchain is also sometimes used.

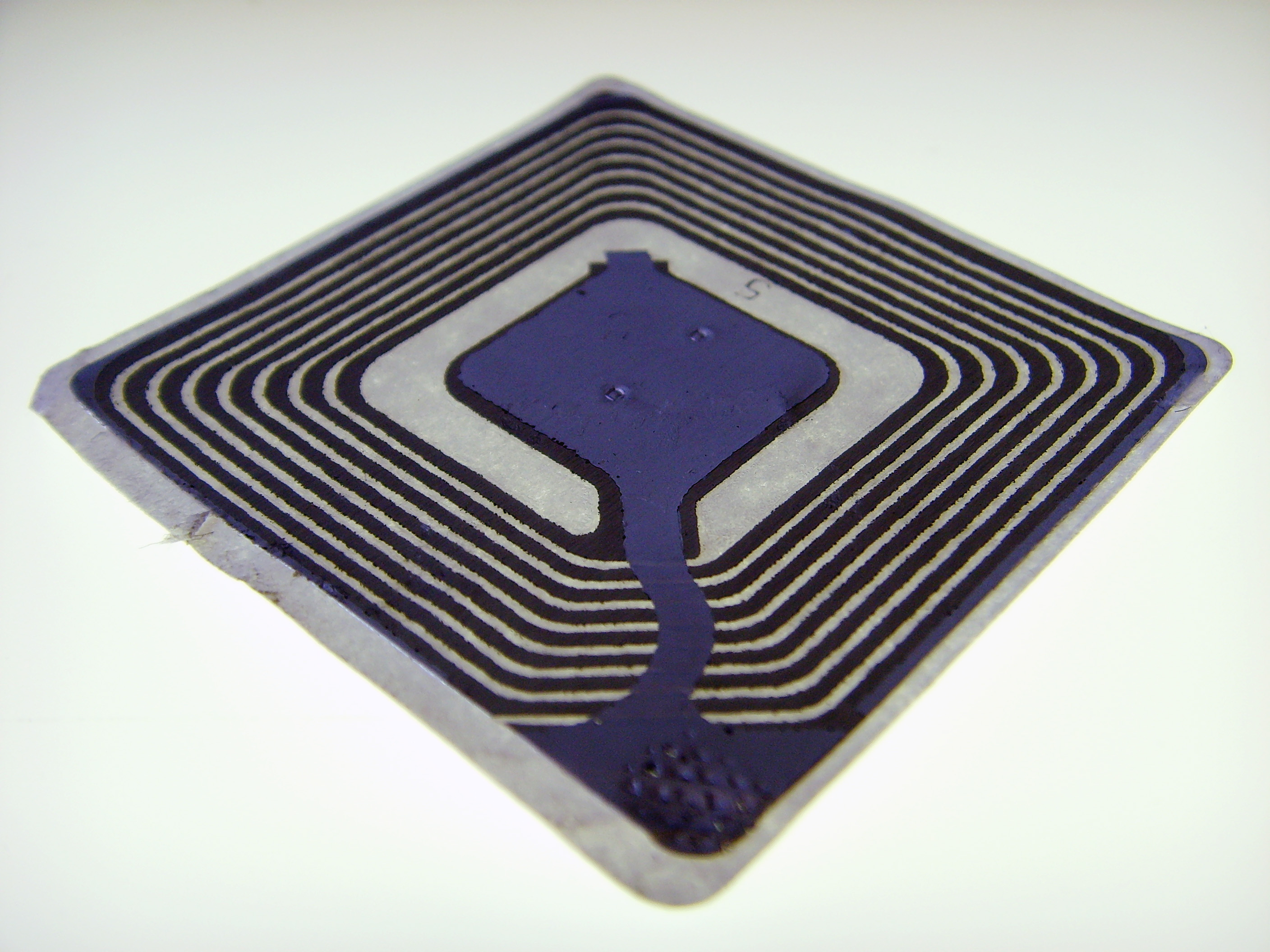
An example of a generic RFID chip

RFID is often used with track-and-trace solutions, and has a critical role to play in supply chains. RFID is a code-carrying technology, and can be used in place of a barcode to enable non-line of sight-reading. Widespread deployment of RFID has been inhibited by certain limitations of the technology: tag cost, tag readability and privacy issues. The cost of RFID tags currently limits their economic justification for item level tagging or case-level tagging in the produce industry. Reading RFID tags requires specialized equipment limiting their usefulness for consumers today. Product orientation, packing density and materials (in particular water, which is predominant in produce) can have a significant detrimental effect on read reliability of passive tags. Finally, the widespread use of RFID tags on consumer goods is anticipated to be contentious until privacy concerns can be satisfied.

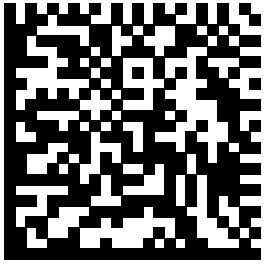
Some produce traceability makers use matrix barcodes to record data on specific produce.

Barcoding is a common and cost-effective method used to implement traceability at both the item and case-level. Variable data in a barcode or a numeric or alphanumeric code format can be applied to the packaging or label. The secure data can be used as a pointer to traceability information and can also correlate with production data such as time to market and product quality.

Packaging converters have a choice of three different classes of technology to print barcodes:

- Inkjet (dot on demand or continuous) systems are capable of printing high resolution (300 dpi or higher for dot on demand) images at press speed (up to 1000fpm). These solutions can be deployed either on-press or off-line.
- Laser marking can be employed to ablate a coating or to cause a color change in certain materials. The advantage of laser is fine detail and high speed for character printing, and no consumables. Not all substrates accept a laser mark, and certain colors (e.g. red) are not suitable for barcode reading.

Thermal Transfer and Direct Thermal. For lower speed off-press applications, thermal transfer and direct thermal printers are ideal for printing variable data on labels.

Software systems are available for managing traceability throughout the entire production, processing, marketing and distribution system. Some of these software systems combine multiple software modules allowing the producer to capture traceability information from all farming, processing and packing activities. Others, capture data in the field and packing operations to integrate with retail buying platforms and carry data all the way to the end consumer. Leveraging new advancements in mobile technology, food brands are now incorporating mobile messaging and QR codes on product labels. Consumers can text or scan the barcode with smartphones for immediate retrieval of product information.

Consumers can also trace the origins of their purchased produce at websites. Consumers can type a code found on a produce item into a search box at the tracing website and view information about the grower, field, and packing operation that the produce came from.

== See also ==
- Track and trace

== Notes ==
- Concerning Agrifood Trade Facilitation - http://unnext.unescap.org/pub/agriguide15.pdf
