= General Product Safety Regulation =

European consumer protection regulation

Regulation 2023/988
- European Union regulation
- Text with EEA relevance
- Title: Regulation (EU) 2023/988 of the European Parliament and of the Council of 10 May 2023 on general product safety
- Made by: European Parliament, EU Council
- Made under: Treaty on the Functioning of the European Union, and in particular Article 114 thereof
- Journal reference: OJ L 135, 23.5.2023, p. 1–51

History
- Date made: 10 May 2023
- Entry into force: 30 May 2023
- Applies from: 13 December 2024

Other legislation
- Replaces: Directive 2001/95/EC

The General Product Safety Regulation (GPSR) is a European regulation on consumer protection. It replaces Directive 2001/95/EC on general product safety. The regulation is intended to ensure that products placed on the market in the European internal market do not endanger the health and safety of consumers through a high level of consumer protection.

== Scope ==
The regulation applies to products placed on the market or made available in the EU. If certain other harmonized legal provisions apply to these products, they are fully or partially exempt from certain obligations, such as the assessment through an internal risk analysis. Some categories of products, like medicinal products, are exempt.

The scope of the regulation includes economic operators such as fulfillment service providers and online marketplace operators.

== Economic operators ==
The GPSR establishes in §3(13) the following roles for economic operators:

- Manufacturer
- Authorised representative
- Importer
- Distributor
- Fulfillment service provider

Non-EU Manufacturers may name an authorised representative in the European Union as a contact point for market surveillance authorities.

== Risk Analysis and Safety Assessment ==
Under Article 5 of the General Product Safety Regulation, manufacturers and other economic operators must ensure that products placed or made available on the EU market are safe. To comply, they must conduct an internal risk analysis and prepare technical documentation demonstrating conformity.

The risk analysis process involves a structured evaluation of hazards associated with a product’s design, materials, and intended use, supported by relevant EU legislation and standards. The technical documentation must include:

- Identification of all economic operators involved, including the manufacturer, authorised representative (if applicable), importer, and any responsible person designated for regulatory compliance.
- A clear general description of the product, its intended function, essential safety characteristics, composition, and intended user age category.
- A list of applicable legal requirements and standards, including cross-references to harmonised European standards where available, and other legislative frameworks such as REACH and sector-specific directives (e.g., toys, electrical equipment, personal protective equipment).
- A systematic assessment of foreseeable hazards related to mechanical, chemical, thermal, electrical, hygiene, and radiation risks, considering product characteristics, intended use, reasonably foreseeable misuse, and vulnerable user groups (e.g., children).

The analysis must categorise risks according to severity (e.g., critical, major, minor), document mitigation measures taken (such as design improvements, warnings, user instructions), and evaluate the adequacy of labeling, packaging, and instructions to reduce residual risks to an acceptable level.

Products that conform to applicable harmonised standards benefit from a presumption of conformity with the general safety requirement for the risks covered by those standards. Where no standards exist, operators must rely on documented alternative methodologies, best practices, and a detailed justification of safety measures.

Economic operators must maintain these records as part of the product’s technical file and present them to national authorities upon request. Failure to conduct a sufficient risk assessment or to maintain adequate documentation may lead to enforcement actions such as product recalls, fines, or market restrictions.

== Labeling Requirements ==
Under Article 9 of the GPSR, manufacturers must ensure products include the following:

- A type, batch or serial number (or another identifier) clearly visible and legible on the product. If size or product nature prevents this, the identifier must appear on packaging or in accompanying documentation.
- The manufacturer’s name, registered trade name or trademark, postal and email address, and, if different, the address of a single contact point.
- Instructions and safety information in a language understood by consumers in each Member State where the product is made available, where necessary for safe and intended use.

The information must be affixed on the product itself or, where impractical, on packaging or in accompanying documents. Digital labels (e.g., QR codes linking to online content) can complement (but cannot replace) these physical labeling requirements.

In addition, Article 19 requires online and distance sellers to clearly display manufacturer or authorised representative information, product identification, and any applicable warnings on their website or online interface.

== Digital Product Passport and Technical File ==
Under the General Product Safety Regulation, manufacturers and other economic operators must compile and maintain technical documentation demonstrating product compliance with safety requirements. This documentation, also referred to as a technical file, serves as the key evidence that a product meets the general safety requirement of the regulation and may be held in digital form as a Digital Product Passport (DPP) when applicable. While certain product information may optionally be provided digitally, such as in a QR code, the technical documentation itself must be available to authorities upon request.

The technical documentation must include a general description of the product, essential characteristics, labels and instructions for safe use, an internal risk assessment identifying hazards and mitigation measures, a list of applicable European standards used to demonstrate conformity, and testing reports where relevant. The Declaration of Conformity is a key element of this documentation, providing a formal statement that the product meets applicable EU legislation.

== Online Marketplace Registration ==
Article 22 of the GPSR introduces new requirements for online marketplaces. Providers of online shops and other digital marketplaces must:

- Register with the EU Safety Gate portal.
- Designate a single point of contact for EU authorities.
- Ensure compliance with product safety reporting obligations.

Marketplaces must also cooperate with regulatory bodies to remove unsafe products swiftly and prevent repeat violations.

== Market Surveillance and Penalties ==
GPSR strengthens enforcement mechanisms across the EU by:

- Requiring mandatory incident reporting within two working days for serious product safety risks.
- Enhancing coordination between national authorities through the EU Safety Gate.
- Harmonizing penalties, including significant fines and product bans for non-compliance.

== Distance Sales, Economic Operators, and Authorised Representatives ==
The GPSR also includes provisions for distance selling that apply to online providers. These providers must register on the Safety Gate portal. Online providers of products covered by the GPSR are also required to fulfill information obligations for consumers. According to Article 19 of the regulation, details about the manufacturer (name or trade name) or the EU-authorized representative of the manufacturer, as well as product identification information (including a product image) and any warnings or safety information about the product, must be provided on the offering website (online interface). Article 22 additionally names specific obligations of providers of online marketplaces that are related to product safety and information.

To enhance accountability, GPSR mandates that non-EU manufacturers appoint an EU-based economic operator to ensure compliance. This can be an EU-based importer, distributor, or an authorized representative.

The EU-based economic operator is responsible for:

- Holding and maintaining the product’s technical documentation.
- Cooperating with EU market surveillance authorities.
- Acting as the official contact point for regulatory compliance inquiries.

If a non-EU manufacturer does not designate an EU-based economic operator, the importer or distributor automatically assumes legal responsibility for product compliance.

== Liability ==
The General Product Safety Regulation confirms that the manufacturer is primarily liable for ensuring that products placed on the EU market are safe and compliant. Article 4 of Directive 85/374/EEC states that manufacturers are liable for damage caused by defective products. While the GPSR requires economic operators such as authorised representatives, importers, and distributors to assist market surveillance authorities, this does not make them liable unless they meet the definition of “producer” under EU law (for example, by branding a product).

The responsible person or authorised representative is a regulatory contact and documentation holder, not the party liable for consumer compensation under the Product Liability Directive.

If the manufacturer is outside the EU and no importer is identifiable, liability may extend to other economic operators to ensure consumer protection.

== Transitional provisions ==
This regulation applies to all products within its scope that are placed on the market from 13 December 2024. The making available on the market of products covered by Directive 2001/95/EC, which comply with that directive and were placed on the market before 13 December 2024, shall not be impeded by EU member states.

== See also ==
- European Authorised Representative
- EU Responsible Person
