= Material passport =

Supply chain document

A material passport is a digital document listing all the materials that are included in a product or construction during its life cycle in order to facilitate strategizing circularity decisions in supply chain management. Passports generally consists of a set of data describing defined characteristics of materials in products, which enables the identification of value for recovery, recycling and re-use. These passports have been adopted as a best practice for business process analysis and improvement in the widely applied supply chain operation reference (SCOR) by the association for supply chain management.

The core idea behind the concept is that a material passport will contribute to a more circular economy, in which materials are being recovered, recycled and/or re-used in an open-traded material market. The concept of the 'material passport' is currently being developed by multiple parties in primarily European countries. Such a passport could make possible second-hand material markets or material banks in the future.

Similar types of passports for the circular economy are being developed by several parties under a variety of terminology. Other names for the material passport are:

- Circularity passport
- Cradle-to-cradle passport
- Product passport

Closely related concepts, which share some of the life cycle registrations that passports also support, are the bill of materials, product life cycle management, digital twin, and ecolabels. The key difference in these concepts is that a passport provides an identity of a single identifiable object and acts as a certified interface to all life-cycle registrations a product is concerned with.

== Significance ==
"According to United Nations estimates, construction accounts for some 50 percent of raw material consumption in Europe and 60 percent of waste."

Assuming that the earth is a closed system, this situation is objectively untenable. There is an urgent need to deal with raw materials in a more sophisticated manner. A shift in the building sector would greatly benefit movement towards needing less material, and using material more effectively, e.g., by ensuring a much longer and more useful life cycle. Proponents of the material passport argue that it is a step in this direction.

The material passport gives material an identity. By acknowledging that the material exists in a given form in a specific building, it ensures that the material receives and keeps a value, e.g., through a possible re-use after the deconstruction of a building for example.

Like a personal passport, the material passport allows the material to 'travel,' or identifies the most useful future destination after it has served in a building (or other project/product). This could be in another building or in another product altogether.

By recognizing the individual materials in buildings (or other products), new ownership structures could be facilitated that would enable more functions to be offered as a service. As lighting can be provided as a service, functions such as "shelter from elements" could be a service instead of owning a roof.

In general, material passports create incentives for suppliers to produce and developers / managers / renovators to choose healthy, sustainable and circular materials/building products. They fit into a broader and growing movement that aims at developing circular building business models.

== Applicability ==
The material passport can be applied to every product or construction. There are different levels in which a product/construct can be discomposed:

- Product level
- Component level
- Material level

For a building, a material passport could be a complete description of all products (staircase, window, furnace, ...), components (iron beam, glass panel, ...), and raw materials (wood, steel, ...), that are present in the building. Ideally, this database would be created during construction and continuously updated. In case an existing building does not yet have a material passport, it can be created through various methods (e.g., plan analysis, digital 3D scanning).

A material passport allows the owner of a product/construction to know exactly what it is made of. This is of importance at the end of its useful life, to enable the most effective re-use of the materials. It allows the owner to view a product/construct as a depot, inventory of valuable materials.

Furthermore, the process of creating a material passport also shapes the design of the building. The easier the materials can be extracted and re-used on deconstruction of the building, the better. This will lead to an increase of 'recoverable' or 'reversible' buildings, buildings that can be dis-assembled as easily as they were assembled.

Another possibility is that a material passport can enable the owner to get better insight into the value of the product/construction. Besides the value of the location and of the space, it could also improve the valuation of the materials used. A higher, or more accurate, valuation of product/construction could be made possible.

== Digital Material Passport (DMP) in Industry ==
While early material passports focused on circularity in the built environment, the Digital Material Passport (DMP) has evolved into a universal Statement of Conformity for the industrial materials sector (e.g., steel, non-ferrous metals, chemicals and engineering plastics).

A Digital Material Passport (DMP) is a machine-readable digital record that describes a material and documents verifiable information about its identity and characteristics across supply chains and lifecycles. A DMP typically includes data on a material’s origin and genealogy, composition, physical and chemical properties, quality and conformance status, and—where relevant—environmental, health, and safety attributes and regulatory approvals. It is designed to enable structured exchange and reuse of material information between organizations and information systems.

In many implementations, a DMP is issued per batch, heat, lot, or delivery, and can link requirements (e.g., specifications or regulatory obligations) with declared or measured results (e.g., test outcomes or certificates). Some DMP approaches use cryptographic methods (such as digital signatures and tamper-evident proofs) to provide integrity and attribution of data to a source, supporting audit trails and traceability without requiring a single centralized database.

=== Purpose and applications ===
Digital Material Passports are used to improve material traceability, reduce reliance on unstructured documents (such as PDFs), and support automated verification in workflows such as procurement, quality assurance, compliance management, and customs or trade documentation. They are also discussed in the context of circular economy and material reuse, where persistent material information can support decisions on reuse, recycling, and lifecycle management.

=== Relationship to other “passport” concepts ===
A DMP focuses on the material level (e.g., steel, aluminum, polymers, chemicals), whereas a digital product passport (DPP) typically focuses on a product and may incorporate information from multiple upstream materials and components. In practice, DMPs can serve as upstream inputs to product-level passport systems.

Under European Union product policy, the DPP is described as a digital container for information on products, components and materials to support sustainability, circularity and compliance; its legal basis is the Ecodesign for Sustainable Products Regulation (Regulation (EU) 2024/1781), with product-group requirements set through delegated acts or related sectoral legislation. Peer-reviewed and EU preparatory work discuss Semantic Web approaches, including shared RDF/OWL vocabularies and ontology networks, as one means of improving semantic interoperability when material- and product-level passport data are exchanged across organisations. A systematic survey of Semantic Web vocabularies for DPP and circular-economy use cases reports fragmented coverage and remaining interoperability gaps for ESPR-aligned exchange.

=== Typical contents ===
A DMP may include, depending on context and industry:

- Material identification (grade, standard designation, batch/lot identifiers)
- Origin and production information (producer, production route, facility, timestamps)
- Composition and properties (chemical analysis, mechanical properties, tolerances)
- Conformance and test data (inspection scope, test results, certificates, declarations)
- Sustainability and safety attributes (e.g., emissions data, recycled content, hazardous substances)
- Traceability links (references to upstream batches, transformation steps, chain-of-custody events)

To ensure interoperability and transparency, the Digital Material Passport (DMP) is structured into three distinct functional layers. This architecture allows for automated verification while maintaining a direct link to the underlying legal source of truth.

=== 1. The Statement of Conformity (The Verdict) ===
The top layer represents the logical outcome of the verification process. It is a machine-readable "verdict" that confirms whether a material batch meets a predefined Specification (e.g., a buyer's procurement criteria or an industry standard). By reducing complex data to a binary or factor-based status, this layer enables "Compliance-as-Code," allowing downstream systems to trigger automated actions—such as goods receipt or payment—without manual document review.

=== 2. The Verifiable Attributes (The Evidence) ===
The middle layer consists of the granular, structured data points extracted from the material's production history and testing. This includes:

- Physical & Chemical Properties: e.g., Tensile strength, Carbon content, or grain size.
- Environmental Metrics: e.g., Product Carbon Footprint (PCF) or recycled content percentage.
- Provenance Data: e.g., Country of origin, smelting plant ID, and batch numbers. These attributes are typically stored in a standardized format (such as JSON), enabling cross-platform searchability and data analytics.

=== 3. The Audit Trail (The Source) ===
The foundation layer ensures the non-repudiation and legal validity of the passport. The DMP does not replace traditional Inspection Documents (such as EN 10204 certificates); rather, it builds upon them. This layer contains the original source documents in their native format (typically PDF or XML/JSON), which are cryptographically hashed or embedded. This ensures that the digital "Attributes" remain permanently tethered to the legally binding "Source," providing a complete history for auditors or regulatory bodies.

== Advantages and disadvantages ==
=== Advantages ===
- By having a material passport, one could better plan the deconstruction of the properties and ensure the highest possible usefulness of the materials after having vacated the premises. This is another way of being conscious about the environment footprint and limiting negative impact on the environment.
- A more granular understanding of the construction of a building might enable novel forms of financing that would support suppliers in providing a service rather than selling a product.
- By reviewing how buildings are valued now, new financing products or financing policies (e.g., higher collateral value) could be developed that better reflect the (financial) value of buildings.
- The recovery of collateral in case of default might improve through the sale of the parts instead of the building as a whole.

=== Disadvantages ===
- A passport needs to be kept up to date and maintained throughout a building's life. It is not known yet how work intensive this could be, but for it to remain relevant, all changes to the building that happened after the passport was created need to be logged. Potentially the value of this work will only be apparent at the end of the useful life of a building, which might be several decades in the future.
- The market for second-hand materials is still in its infancy, and currently not able to support the optimal re-use of the materials in a building. Also, much more standardization, at least at the level of components, will be needed to increase re-use of materials in a building.
- There is no standardization for material passports yet. Passports might therefore prove to have limited usefulness when ultimately needed, due to evolving requirements, or require additional investments during the life of the building to keep them up to market standard.
- Legislation needs to be put in place to support more sustainable building, enable the development of services instead of ownership, and support a broad deployment of material passports.
- The infrastructure, mainly information technology, to support material passports still needs to be created.

The first scientific publication about a material passport (2012) was written by Maayke Damen and is called "A resources passport for a circular economy". It provides a comprehensive overview of the advantages and disadvantages of a material passport for every actor in the supply chain. It includes an outline for the content of a material passport.

== Projects ==
- ActNow: A business-driven non-profit partnership consisting of businesses, NGOs and municipalities. Act NOW's agenda focuses on enhancing the implementation of existing energy-efficient solutions and products NOW.
- BAMB 2020: Buildings as Material Banks, an EU funded project bringing together 16 European parties (universities, building, it companies, consultants, policy makers). Partners: Brussels Environment, EPEA Nederland, Vrije UNiversiteit Brussel, BRE, ZUYD Hogeschool, IBM, SundaHus, Ronneby Kommun, Technical University of Munich, Universiteit Twente, Universidade do Minho, Sarajevo Green Design Foundation, Drees & Sommer, VITO, BAM Construct UK, Aurubis.
- Battery Passport proof-of-concept pilots, launched at the World Economic Forum (2023), and by the Global Battery Alliance (GBA): material traceability via a "digital twin" to an Electric Vehicle's physical battery at point of sale, providing Environmental, Social and Governance data across the value chain. The GBA is legally incorporated in Belgium, its incorporation dating from 2022.
- COFA Nederland: Initiative of FBBasic and A. van Liempd demolition contractors to develop a more circular way of demolition and re-use of materials.
- Concept House Village (RDM)
- DCMP: Digital Construction Material Passport, an open, XML based, data format for material passports for the construction industry. Stems from the Danish industry initiative Sustainable Build and also builds on learnings from BAMB 2020.
- EPEA (also partner of BAMB): An internationally active scientific research and consultancy institute that works with actors and companies from economy, politics and science and support them for the introduction of circular processes, using the cradle-to-cradle design approach.
- Maersk Line (sea-vessels): The world's largest container shipping company. They focus on vessel recycling and re-use.
- Turntoo: consultancy firm established by Thomas Rau, that offers services and concepts optimizing the continuity of life on earth. The development of material passports as a product is one of them. Thomas Rau's system is called MADASTER.

== See also ==
- EU Digital Product Passport
- Battery passport
- Circular economy
