= Technical file =

Set of drawings detailing product design

A technical file is a set of documents that describes a product and can prove that the product was designed in accordance with the requirements of a quality management system.

All products that fall under the scope of the General Product Safety Regulation (EU) 2023/988 (GPSR), including CE-marked products, must have a technical file (also referred to as a Digital Product Passport) that contains information demonstrating conformity with the applicable safety requirements. The technical file must additionally show compliance with the relevant EU directives and regulations. EU enforcement authorities may request a copy of the technical file for many years after the last product was made. Consumers do not normally have access to the technical file.

== Content ==
Under the GPSR, a technical file must be maintained for all consumer products placed on the EU market to demonstrate compliance with general safety requirements. The technical file can be stored on paper or electronically and must ensure long-term availability and accessibility.

It typically includes:

- General product information: description, type/model, intended use, target user group, materials/composition (bill of materials), photographs or drawings.
- Labels and instructions for use: safety warnings, multilingual instructions, and manufacturer/importer/EU Responsible Person details, as required under GPSR.
- Risk assessment and mitigation: analysis of hazards (physical, chemical, electrical, flammability, hygiene, foreseeable misuse, and vulnerable users), severity ratings, and documentation of mitigation measures.
- Compliance documents:
  - EU Declaration of Conformity (DoC), including manufacturer/importer details, applicable legislation, list of standards applied, date, and signature.
  - Certificates, supplier declarations, and conformity test reports (e.g., EN 71, REACH, RoHS).
- List of standards applied: harmonised or other relevant European standards supporting conformity.
- Safety data sheets, toxicological assessment reports, composition sheets, or supplier declarations.

All documents must be retained for at least 10 years after the product is placed on the EU market.

A single document may serve as an index or overview listing all other documents that constitute the technical file. The full technical documentation must be made available without delay to the competent authorities upon request.

== Medical devices ==
The sub-clause 4.2.3 of ISO 13485:2016 requires a manufacturer of a medical device to establish a technical file (medical device file, device master record, design dossier, or device master file). Annex II and III of the EU medical device regulation (MDR) and of the In-vitro Diagnostic Regulation (IVDR) contain an overview of the contents and structure of a technical file, here called Technical documentation.

== See also ==
- Device Master Record – a similar concept in the US for medical devices
- Technical documentation
