= EU Digital Product Passport =

Digital product information system introduced under EU legislation

A Digital Product Passport (DPP) is a digital record containing information about a product, its components or materials throughout their life cycle. Under the EU's Ecodesign for Sustainable Products Regulation (ESPR), DPP requirements are being introduced progressively for selected product groups through delegated acts. Separate EU legislation may also establish DPP requirements for specific products, including batteries and construction products. The system is intended to improve supply chain transparency, support circularity and facilitate access to product information for consumers, businesses and public authorities.

Digital Product Passports can be accessed through data carriers such as QR codes, barcodes or NFC tags, which connect a physical product to structured digital information. Product information is stored in a decentralised manner, while the European Commission's DPP Registry records unique product identifiers and associated mandatory metadata.

== Purpose ==
The DPP is intended to improve product traceability and facilitate access to information across supply chains. It also supports circular economy objectives, including repair, reuse and recycling, by making information about materials, components, durability and end-of-life management more accessible. Depending on the product category, it can provide consumers, repairers, recyclers and public authorities with information on product origin, compliance, sustainability and lifecycle management.

== Key components ==
The information contained in a Digital Product Passport varies according to the product category and the applicable legislation. Under the ESPR, product-specific delegated acts determine the detailed information requirements. Depending on the applicable requirements, a DPP may include:

- A unique product identifier, such as a model, batch or serial number.
- Information identifying the manufacturer and other relevant economic operators.
- Material and composition details, including relevant substances.
- Product performance and environmental information.
- Information on durability, repairability, maintenance and upgradeability.
- Instructions for reuse, recycling and end-of-life management.
- Compliance and safety information where required by the applicable product legislation.

The DPP's information requirements should be distinguished from the technical documentation required under other product legislation. For example, the General Product Safety Regulation (GPSR) requires manufacturers to prepare technical documentation containing information necessary to assess product safety. Depending on the product, this can include a product description, risk analysis, relevant European standards and test reports. Such documentation is not automatically identical to the information required in a DPP.

== Interoperability and semantic data standards ==
Under the Ecodesign for Sustainable Products Regulation, digital product passport data must use open standards and formats, remain machine-readable and transferable, and be interoperable with other DPPs in technical, semantic and organisational respects. The European Commission describes the DPP as a digital container for sustainability, circularity and compliance information, with product-group requirements set through delegated acts and related legislation.

EU preparatory work and peer-reviewed research discuss Semantic Web approaches, including RDF and OWL ontologies, knowledge graphs and shared vocabularies, as a means to achieve semantic interoperability across sectors, while recognising that multiple industry vocabularies may coexist. Related work specifies ontology requirements derived from the ESPR and proposes modular Ontology Design Pattern-based models for cross-sector DPPs.

CIRPASS-2 related work publishes a proposed EU DPP core ontology and related vocabularies through a public vocabulary hub. A systematic survey of Semantic Web vocabularies for DPP and circular-economy use cases reports fragmented coverage and remaining interoperability gaps for ESPR-aligned data exchange.

A broader literature review of 186 publications on DPP systems examines the role of semantic technologies, ontologies, knowledge graphs, digital twins and data carriers in product information management and cross-domain interoperability.

A technical reference article published in October 2026 in Techniques de l'Ingénieur also examines the European DPP framework, data engineering requirements and reference architectures for industrial deployment.

International policy analysis likewise stresses interoperability between emerging DPP schemes, including through shared reference frameworks such as the UN Transparency Protocol.

== Relationship to GPSR ==
The General Product Safety Regulation (GPSR) and the DPP framework address related but distinct aspects of product regulation. The GPSR establishes general safety requirements for consumer products and requires manufacturers to maintain technical documentation and conduct risk assessments. The ESPR establishes the framework for DPP requirements, including the information that must be made accessible for particular product categories.

A Digital Product Passport may provide access to selected safety-related and compliance information where required by the relevant legislation. It does not, by itself, replace the manufacturer's obligations to maintain technical documentation or fulfil the requirements of the GPSR.

== Implementation roadmap ==
The implementation of the DPP follows a phased approach under the ESPR and other relevant EU legislation. Product-specific requirements are introduced progressively through delegated acts and separate sectoral regulations. The European Commission's indicative timeline identifies initial product groups including batteries, iron and steel, textiles, aluminium, tyres, furniture, mattresses and information and communication technology products.

On 20 July 2026, the European Commission launched the DPP Registry together with a testing environment for economic operators. The Registry records unique product identifiers and associated mandatory metadata, while product information itself is stored in a decentralised manner.

Eight harmonised standards have been developed to support the DPP system. As of October 2026, six standards covering unique identifiers, interoperability, data carriers, application programming interfaces, data exchange protocols and data storage are available; the Commission's indicative timeline schedules the remaining two for November 2026.

The first mandatory DPP implementation date is 18 February 2027 for certain categories of batteries, including electric vehicle batteries, light means of transport batteries and industrial batteries. Additional product groups will follow according to the applicable delegated acts and sector-specific legislation. Under the ESPR, economic operators are to receive a transition period of at least 18 months following the adoption of relevant delegated acts.

== See also ==
- Battery passport – Digital record system for rechargeable batteries
