= Battery passport =

Digital record system for rechargeable batteries

Battery passport (also referred to as a digital battery passport) is a form of Digital Product Passport or Material Passport designed for rechargeable batteries. It is a machine-readable digital record intended to accompany a battery throughout its lifecycle and standardize information related to identity, provenance, material composition, performance, and environmental impact. The passport links a physical battery to a digital information layer that can be accessed via a data carrier or unique identifier and used by manufacturers, regulators, recyclers, and end users to retrieve lifecycle information.

Battery passports are intended to support the circular economy by improving traceability, enabling second-life applications, and supporting compliance with sustainability and transparency requirements, particularly for lithium-ion batteries.

== Background and policy development ==
=== European Union regulation ===
Battery passports were introduced as part of the European Union’s sustainability and circularity agenda. The Ecodesign for Sustainable Products Regulation (ESPR) establishes a framework for setting ecodesign requirements and includes the EU approach to digital product passports; it has applied since 18 July 2024.

Under the EU Battery Regulation (Regulation (EU) 2023/1542), each light means of transport (LMT) battery, each industrial battery with a capacity greater than 2 kWh, and each electric vehicle battery placed on the market or put into service must have an electronic record (“battery passport”) from 18 February 2027.

=== Digital product passport framework ===
The battery passport is often discussed as a sector-specific implementation of the EU digital product passport approach. The ESPR provides that products covered by delegated acts can only be placed on the market or put into service if a digital product passport is available and sets requirements for interoperability and access rights for different stakeholder groups. The European Commission describes the digital product passport as a “digital identity card” for products, components, and materials, intended to store relevant information to support sustainability and circularity and strengthen compliance.

=== Battery Pass initiative ===
Battery Pass is an industry–research consortium project associated with the Circular Economy Initiative Deutschland (CEID) and supported by German federal funding, aiming to develop content and technical standards for implementation of the EU battery passport and demonstrate them in a pilot. Battery Pass publications include content and technical guidance documents intended to interpret and operationalize EU requirements for battery passports.

=== Global Battery Alliance and international initiatives ===
At the international level, the Global Battery Alliance (GBA) has developed a voluntary battery passport framework focusing on sustainability reporting and certification across the battery supply chain.

== Purpose and functions ==
The primary purpose of a battery passport is to improve traceability across the battery value chain. By linking a battery to verified information about sourcing, manufacturing, usage, and end-of-life treatment, the passport supports regulatory compliance and decision-making for reuse and recycling.

Battery passports are also associated with second-life deployment by enabling assessment of battery condition and remaining useful life for repurposing in stationary energy storage systems.

== Data model and technology ==
=== Static and dynamic data ===
Battery passport data are commonly divided into:

- static data, such as identifiers, chemistry, form factor, and manufacturing details; and
- dynamic data, including operational history, state of health indicators, and related condition metrics.

=== Condition reporting and online diagnostics ===
Because battery condition evolves during operation, battery passports may rely on periodic or event-based updates from battery management system (BMS) telemetry (e.g., voltage, current, temperature, cycle count, and fault records) to support ongoing condition assessment.

=== Electrochemical impedance spectroscopy ===
Electrochemical impedance spectroscopy (EIS) is discussed as a diagnostic method that can provide chemistry-aware degradation indicators and detect internal changes not visible in capacity-only metrics. The literature surveyed in the referenced review discusses online EIS approaches and how impedance-based indicators could be incorporated into passport reporting and second-life grading workflows.

== Industry adoption and implementations ==
=== EU implementation ===
From 18 February 2027, batteries in the EU scope (LMT, EV, and industrial batteries above 2 kWh) cannot be placed on the market or put into service without a battery passport as defined in Article 77 of Regulation (EU) 2023/1542. Battery Pass technical guidance describes the battery passport as a pilot implementation of a sector-specific digital product passport and discusses standardization and technical infrastructure needs for implementation.

=== Voluntary frameworks and national approaches ===
Outside the EU, traceability initiatives exist but are generally voluntary and vary by jurisdiction. The referenced review summarizes non-EU initiatives and highlights interoperability and data-quality challenges for global passport adoption.

=== CellPassport workflow ===
CellPassport is a proposed workflow for cell-level battery diagnostics and lifecycle tracking described in a white paper and in an Aalborg University project listing.

According to its white paper and the project description, CellPassport uses operational voltage and current data available from a BMS and applies FFT-based analysis to derive impedance-related indicators without an externally injected excitation signal, with results processed in a cloud-based digital twin for each cell.

Aalborg University maintains an internal “Proof of Concept” (PoC) innovation funding program for maturation of research with commercial potential; this program is administered through AAU Innovation/Technology Transfer Office.

== See also ==
- Electrochemical impedance spectroscopy
- Digital Product Passport
