= Ministry of Health (Italy) =

Government ministry of Italy

- Ministero della Salute

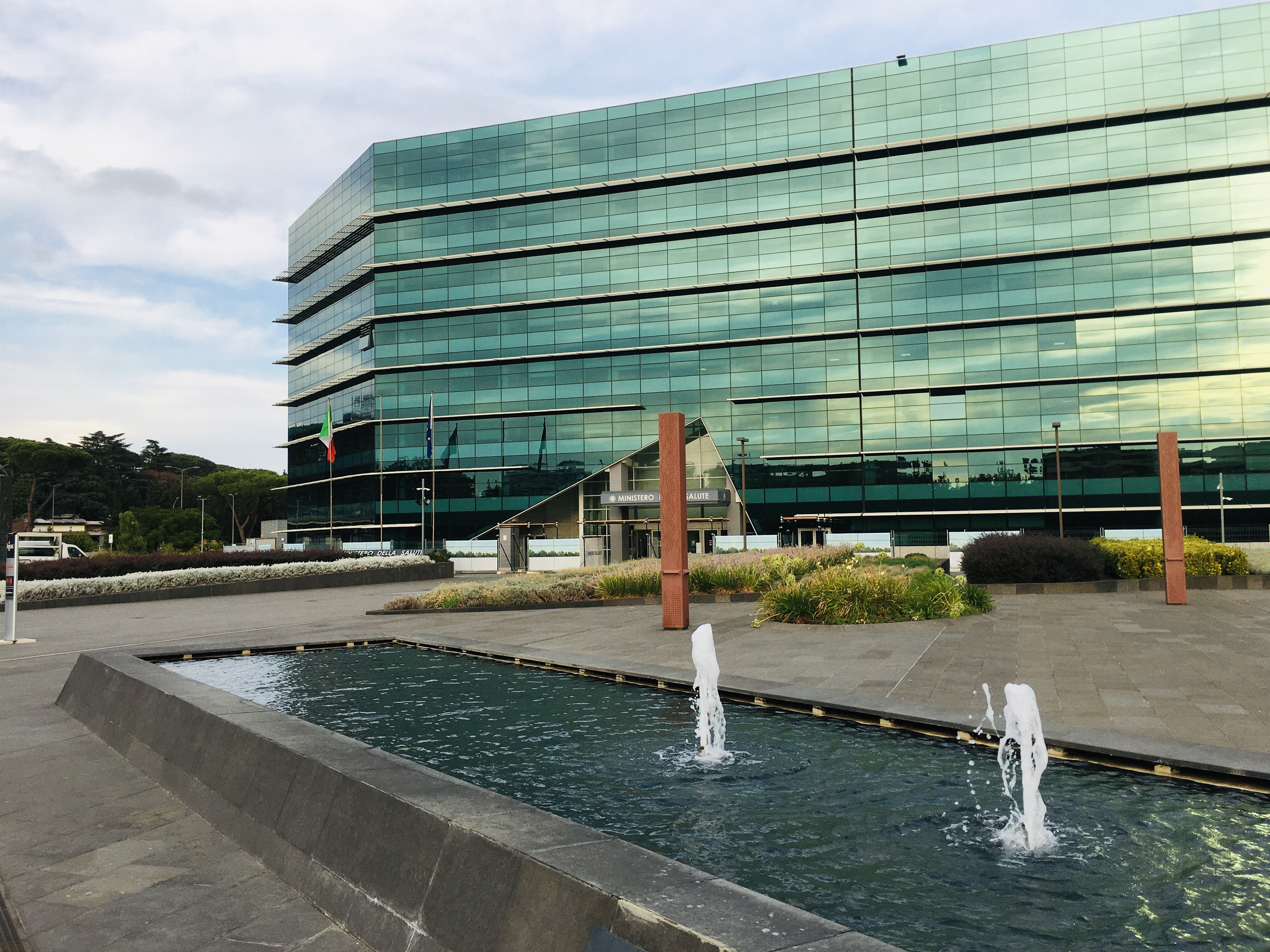
- Headquarters in viale G. Ribotta, 5

Agency overview
- Formed: 1958; 68 years ago
- Jurisdiction: Government of Italy
- Headquarters: Viale Giorgio Ribotta, 5 - 00144 Rome Main Headquarters Lungotevere Ripa, 1 - 00153 Rome Minister Office
- Website: www.salute.gov.it

The Ministry of Health (Italian: Ministero della Salute) is a governmental agency of Italy. Its headquarters are in Rome and is led by the Italian Minister of Health.

The Ministry developed the Italian Food Pyramid (Piramide Alimentare Italiana) to guide food and meal planning. The divisions show healthy intake of water, fruits and vegetables, starches (bread, biscotti, pasta, etc.), protein (meat, cold cut meats, eggs, fish, etc.), milk and dairy, and occasional uses (oils, sweets, and alcohol). The pyramid is intended to represent the variety of foods eaten over an entire week, averaged into daily portions.

An example of their legislation is the Italian Device Registration to meet (and exceed) the EEC's Medical Devices Directive.

== See also ==
- Italian Minister of Health
