= Confirmed line item performance =

The Confirmed Line Item Performance (CLIP) is one of the diagnostic metrics for perfect order fulfillment which defines the supply chain delivery reliability measurement between facilities within a supply chain.

Those facilities may belong to one company or span over several companies. CLIP is an analog measurement taking the portion of fulfillment into account using customer commit date as reference date. This intends a usage within a supply chain part with a fixed-period demand pattern (e.g. daily or weekly) and a permanent material flow (e.g. between production and distribution center), which is later on again split to be sent to different customers and locations.

== Definition ==
CLIP shows the relation between the sum of the deliveries and excess deliveries compared to the sum of orders and actual backlog by part number for the considered period of time. In aggregation of all part numbers (identifier for production control, calculation, shipment and other purposes products), it shows the status of order fulfillment. Excess delivery (pre- plus over-delivery) for one product (specified by its part number) does not compensate for the backlog of another product.

The definitions for backlog, pre-delivery, over-delivery and excess delivery for a single product are as follows:

- There is a backlog if the sum of the delivery is less than the sum of the commitment.
- There is a pre-delivery if the sum of the delivery is greater than the sum of the commitment and there are orders for the future.
- There is an over-delivery if the sum of the delivery is greater than the sum of the commitment but there are no more orders in the future.
- The excess delivery is the sum of pre-delivery and over-delivery.

To determine the confirmed line item performance two "virtual" quantities are introduced: the virtually committed order and the virtual delivery. The virtually committed order for a product p consists of the actual order for the considered delivery week (DW) plus any backlog of this product accumulated up to that week.

- virtually committed order_{p,DW} = actual order_{p,DW} + backlog_{p,DW}

The virtual delivery for a product consists of the actually delivered chips within the considered delivery week plus any excess deliveries of this product accumulated up to that week.

- virtual delivery_{p,DW} = actual delivery_{p,DW} + excess delivery_{p,DW}

The confirmed line item performance of one product p for a delivery week is calculated as the ratio of the virtual delivery to the virtually committed order. If there are more chips delivered than ordered, the CLIP weekly of the respective product is 100%.

- $CLIP_{weekly,p}$ = $min[\frac{vitual delivery_{p,DW}}{virtually committed order_{p,DW}},1]$×100%

The CLIPweekly of the whole site is calculated as the average CLIPweekly of all products with a virtually committed order. Each product is counted separately (by part number). There is no weighting by volume applied.

- $CLIP_{weekly,p}$ = $[\frac{\sum_{p=1}^{number of ordered products}(CLIP_{weekly,p})}{number of ordered products}]$×100%

== Aggregation ==
CLIP is being measured for every part number. The CLIP value of a certain “bundle“ (location, PL, Segment etc.) of part numbers is calculated by averaging the CLIP values of the individual part number in that “bundle“. Each part number in an aggregation (“bundle”) is counted as 1, irrespective of how big the volume of production for that part number is.

The lateness compared to the confirmed date is taken into account. In every period p the backlog of previous periods is not fulfilled the CLIP performance is worsened signaling the receiver an open demand.
