= Delivery reliability =

Measure of completeness and timeliness of delivery

Delivery reliability is concerned with the completeness and timeliness of delivery of goods which have been ordered. It is one of the five attributes in supply-chain management according to SCOR-model, developed by the management consulting firm PRTM, now part of PricewaterhouseCoopers LLP, (PwC) and endorsed by the Supply-Chain Council (SCC) as the cross-industry de facto standard diagnostic tool for supply chain management, SCOR measures the supplier’s ability to predictably complete processes as promised. It is measured by perfect order fulfillment and demonstrates the degree to which a supplier is able to serve its customers within the promised delivery time. Companies can apply the concept to the delivery of their incoming materials orders and their delivery of products to customers.

Following the nomenclature of the DR-DP-Matrix, three main approaches to measure DR can be distinguished:

- $DR_{T}^{V}$ (equivalent to confirmed line item performance, or CLIP)
- $DR_{D}^{S}$
- $DR_{T}^{S}$

Type of measurement: volume (V)/singular(S)
Type of view: on time (T)/ delivery (D)

== Volume/on time ==
This measure is equivalent to confirmed line item performance (CLIP).

=== Formula ===
If ($Demand_{p,c} + Backlog_{p-1,c}>0$)

$DR_{T}^{V}$ = $min(\frac{Delivered_{p,c} + Predelivery_{p-1,c}}{Demand_{p,c} + Backlog_{p-1,c}}, 1)$

Note: In the case where a supplier notifies the appropriate partner in the supply chain that a promised delivery date/quantity cannot be met, which is called delivery early warning (DEW), the sum of DEWs issued to reduce the commit for a certain week is added in the denominator.

Else

NULL

Demand: Suppliers confirmed quantity; c: Product identifier;p: Time period e.g. a day, a week, a month ...

The cumulation over a period and a group of product identifiers c is done as follows:

$$DR_{p,c} = \frac{\sum_{p,c}(DR_{T}^{V})}{count_{p,c}(DR_{T}^{V}<>NULL)}$$

whereas p is determined by demand period.

== Singular/delivery and singular/on Time ==
=== Singular case definition ===
To fit to the needs of the environment, the granularity of a singular case ($DR_{*}^{S}$) has to be defined. In general a singular case is described by an n-Tuple consisting of a set of the following order and delivery details:

- order number
- customer identifier
- product identifier
- wish date of customer (the date when the customer wants the material to be in their facilities)
- confirmed date of supplier
- ship to information
- delivery date
- delivery note number

=== Formula ===
1) $DR_{D}^{S}$

After a singular case has been delivered to the customer its DR is measured as follows:

If (wish date <= arrival date <= confirmed date of supplier) then

DR_{singular case}=1

else

DR_{singular case}=0

arrival date = delivery date + transit time

By cumulating the results of singular cases over a certain period p and, if necessary, additional criteria c (e.g. customer, product, ...) the delivery reliability is calculated as follows:

$$DR_{p,c} = \frac{\sum_{p,c}(DR)}{count_{p,c}(singular cases)}$$

whereas p is determined by the arrival date.

2) $DR_{T}^{S}$

After a period has elapsed all singular cases with first confirmed date within period are considered and their DR is measured as follows:

If (wish date <= arrival date <= confirmed date of supplier) then

DR_{singular case}=1

else

DR_{singular case}=0

arrival date = delivery date + transit time

By cumulating the results of singular cases over a certain period p and, if necessary, additional criteria c (e.g. customer, product, ...) the delivery reliability is calculated as follows:

$$DR_{p,c} = \frac{\sum_{p,c}(DR)}{count_{p,c}(singular cases)}$$

whereas p is determined by the first confirmed date.

== Result ==
0%≤$DR_{T/D}^{S/V}$≤100%
