= Medical Devices Directive =

EU directive

Directive 93/42/EEC
- European Union directive
- Title: Council Directive concerning medical devices
- Made by: Council
- Made under: Art. 100a TEEC
- Journal reference: [31993L0042 L169, 12 July 1993 pp. 1-43]

History
- Date made: 1993-06-14
- Entry into force: 1993-07-12
- Implementation date: 1994-07-01

Other legislation
- Replaces: Directive 76/764/EEC
- Amends: Directive 84/539/EEC, Directive 90/385/EEC
- Replaced by: Regulation (EU) 2017/745

The Medical Device Directive—Council Directive 93/42/EEC of 14 June 1993 concerning medical devices—is intended to harmonise the laws relating to medical devices within the European Union. The MD Directive is a 'New Approach' Directive and consequently in order for a manufacturer to legally place a medical device on the European market the requirements of the MD Directive have to be met. Manufacturers' products meeting 'harmonised standards' have a presumption of conformity to the Directive. Products conforming with the MD Directive must have a CE mark applied. The Directive was most recently reviewed and amended by the 2007/47/EC and a number of changes were made. Compliance with the revised directive became mandatory on 21 March 2010.

The Medical Devices Directive is being repealed and replaced by the 2017 EU Medical Device Regulation (EU 2017/745), effective on 26 May 2021.

== See also ==
- European Medical Devices Industry Group
- Registration of medical devices in Italy
