= CJK Unified Ideographs Extension B =

- Range: U+20000..U+2A6DF (42,720 code points)
- Plane: SIP
- Scripts: Han
- Assigned: 42,720 code points
- Unused: 0 reserved code points

Unicode Version History
- 3.1 (2001): 42,711 (+42,711)
- 13.0 (2020): 42,718 (+7)
- 14.0 (2021): 42,720 (+2)

Unicode documentation
- Code chart ∣ Web page

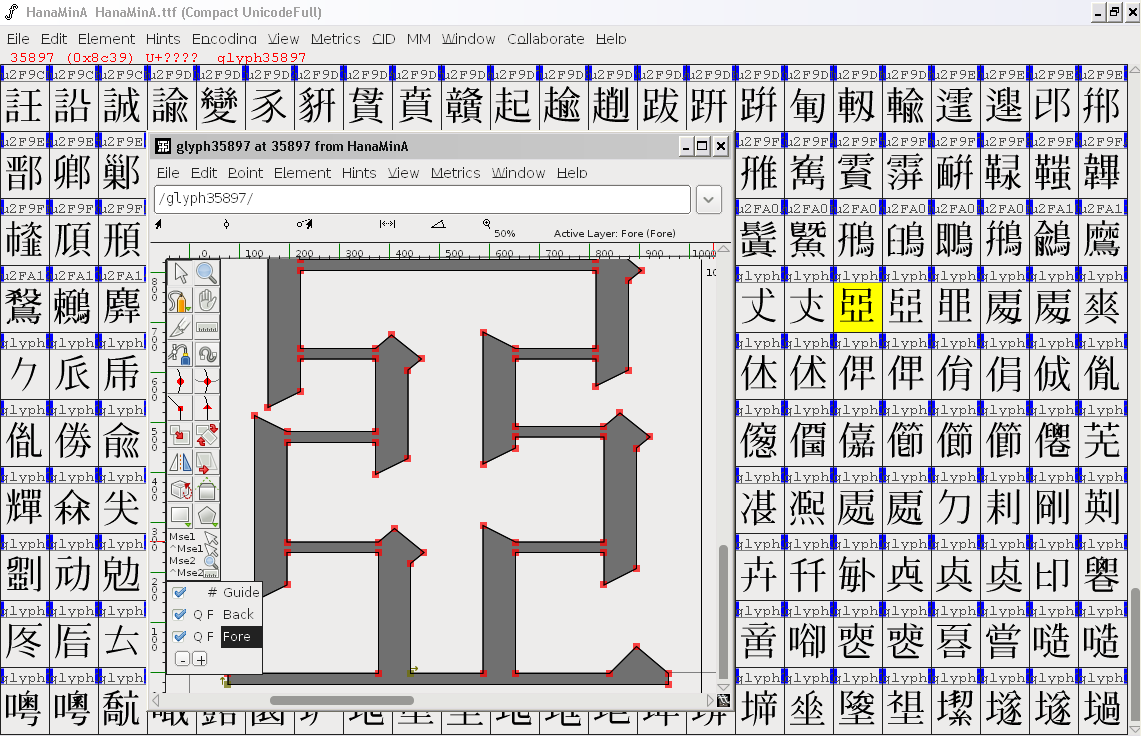
A screenshot of a CJK extension B on Fontforge

CJK Unified Ideographs Extension B is a Unicode block containing rare and historic CJK ideographs for Chinese, Japanese, Korean, and Vietnamese submitted to the Ideographic Research Group between 1998 and 2000, plus seven gongche characters for kunqu added in Unicode 13.0, and two characters for the Macao Supplementary Character Set added in Unicode 14.0.

== Variation selector sequences ==
The block has dozens of variation sequences defined for standardized variants. It also has thousands of ideographic variation sequences registered in the Unicode Ideographic Variation Database (IVD). These sequences specify the desired glyph variant for a given Unicode character.

== Development process ==
=== SuperCJK ===
The repertoire of Extension B was developed by the Ideographic Rapporteur Group in successive revisions of a document named "SuperCJK". This lists all characters included at the time in the Unified Repertoire and Ordering, in Extension A and in the draft Extension B, ordered by radical and residual stroke count. Each character was included with up to four glyph bitmaps, and references to character sources including the Kangxi Dictionary, the Hanyu Da Zidian, and various national character set standards.

=== "UCS2003" glyphs ===
Extension B was the only CJK Unified Ideographs Extension block with a UCS2003 source identifier. Since Extension B contained too many characters, the original code charts were produced with a single glyph for all regions. The glyphs were designed by Beijing Zhongyi Electronic Ltd. After the introduction of multi-column code charts on Unicode 5.2, the original glyphs were retained under the UCS2003 source identifier; they were then removed in Unicode 14.0, being redundant as well as misleading. The glyphs are packaged in the "SimSun-ExtB" font distributed with the Simplified Chinese versions of Windows, and do not adhere to the glyphs for the Mainland China region.

== Known issues ==
Ken Lunde noted that what happens in Extension B stays in Extension B. Peter Constable pointed out that we have been dealing with many historical errors in this block over the years.

— UTC #187 meeting minutes

=== Size ===
Extension B contains 42720 (initially 42711) characters, more than double the 20992 included in the Unified Repertoire and Ordering, and far more than any other CJK extension block (the second-largest of which, as of Unicode 17.0, is CJK Unified Ideographs Extension F, with 7473 characters). This also makes it the only block, besides Private Use Areas, to occupy more than half of the 65534 allocatable codepoints in a Unicode plane.

Owing to its size, a number of mistakes have been discovered in the original version of Extension B since it was encoded. To facilitate better review of proposed characters, the working set size for subsequent CJK extension blocks has been kept much smaller; for example, the Ideographic Research Group currently requests that its member bodies should usually submit no more than 2500 characters each, so as to keep the size of the working set below 10000 characters if possible.

=== Unifiable variants and exact duplicates in Extension B ===
In CJK Unified Ideographs Extension B, hundreds of glyph variants were encoded. In addition to the deliberate encoding of close glyph variants, seven exact duplicates (where the same character has inadvertently been encoded twice) and two semi-duplicates (where the CJK-B character represents a de facto disunification of two glyph forms unified in the corresponding BMP character) were encoded by mistake:

==== Included in Extension B twice ====
- U+204F2 𠓲 = U+23515 𣔕 : same glyph shapes, but ordered under different radicals
- U+21018 𡀘 = U+2103C 𡀼 : same glyph shapes
- U+249BC 𤦼 = U+249E9 𤧩 : same glyph shapes
- U+24BD2 𤯒 = U+2A415 𪐕 : same glyph shapes, but ordered under different radicals
- U+26842 𦡂 = U+26866 𦡦 : same glyph shapes

==== Unconditional exact duplicate of Basic Multilingual Plane character ====
- U+3DB7 㶷 = U+2420E 𤈎 : same glyph shapes
- U+FA23 﨣 = U+27EAF 𧺯 : same glyph shapes (U+FA23 﨣 is a unified CJK ideograph, despite its name "CJK COMPATIBILITY IDEOGRAPH-FA23.")

==== Exact duplicate of Basic Multilingual Plane character in some localised fonts ====
- U+34A8 㒨 = U+20457 𠑗 : U+20457 is the same as the China-source glyph for U+34A8, but it is significantly different from the Taiwan-source glyph for U+34A8
- U+8641 虁 = U+27144 𧅄 : U+27144 is the same as the Korean-source glyph for U+8641, but it is significantly different from the mainland Chinese-, Taiwan- and Japan-source glyphs for U+8641

== Block ==
Chart
This list is a single Unicode block. For an overview of all CJK ideograph blocks in Unicode, see CJK Unified Ideographs.

CJK Unified Ideographs Extension B^{[1]} Official Unicode Consortium code chart (PDF)
	0	1	2	3	4	5	6	7	8	9	A	B	C	D	E	F
U+2000x	𠀀	𠀁	𠀂	𠀃	𠀄	𠀅	𠀆	𠀇	𠀈	𠀉	𠀊	𠀋	𠀌	𠀍	𠀎	𠀏
U+2001x	𠀐	𠀑	𠀒	𠀓	𠀔	𠀕	𠀖	𠀗	𠀘	𠀙	𠀚	𠀛	𠀜	𠀝	𠀞	𠀟
U+2002x	𠀠	𠀡	𠀢	𠀣	𠀤	𠀥	𠀦	𠀧	𠀨	𠀩	𠀪	𠀫	𠀬	𠀭	𠀮	𠀯
U+2003x	𠀰	𠀱	𠀲	𠀳	𠀴	𠀵	𠀶	𠀷	𠀸	𠀹	𠀺	𠀻	𠀼	𠀽	𠀾	𠀿
U+2004x	𠁀	𠁁	𠁂	𠁃	𠁄	𠁅	𠁆	𠁇	𠁈	𠁉	𠁊	𠁋	𠁌	𠁍	𠁎	𠁏
U+2005x	𠁐	𠁑	𠁒	𠁓	𠁔	𠁕	𠁖	𠁗	𠁘	𠁙	𠁚	𠁛	𠁜	𠁝	𠁞	𠁟
U+2006x	𠁠	𠁡	𠁢	𠁣	𠁤	𠁥	𠁦	𠁧	𠁨	𠁩	𠁪	𠁫	𠁬	𠁭	𠁮	𠁯
U+2007x	𠁰	𠁱	𠁲	𠁳	𠁴	𠁵	𠁶	𠁷	𠁸	𠁹	𠁺	𠁻	𠁼	𠁽	𠁾	𠁿
U+2008x	𠂀	𠂁	𠂂	𠂃	𠂄	𠂅	𠂆	𠂇	𠂈	𠂉	𠂊	𠂋	𠂌	𠂍	𠂎	𠂏
U+2009x	𠂐	𠂑	𠂒	𠂓	𠂔	𠂕	𠂖	𠂗	𠂘	𠂙	𠂚	𠂛	𠂜	𠂝	𠂞	𠂟
U+200Ax	𠂠	𠂡	𠂢	𠂣	𠂤	𠂥	𠂦	𠂧	𠂨	𠂩	𠂪	𠂫	𠂬	𠂭	𠂮	𠂯
U+200Bx	𠂰	𠂱	𠂲	𠂳	𠂴	𠂵	𠂶	𠂷	𠂸	𠂹	𠂺	𠂻	𠂼	𠂽	𠂾	𠂿
U+200Cx	𠃀	𠃁	𠃂	𠃃	𠃄	𠃅	𠃆	𠃇	𠃈	𠃉	𠃊	𠃋	𠃌	𠃍	𠃎	𠃏
U+200Dx	𠃐	𠃑	𠃒	𠃓	𠃔	𠃕	𠃖	𠃗	𠃘	𠃙	𠃚	𠃛	𠃜	𠃝	𠃞	𠃟
U+200Ex	𠃠	𠃡	𠃢	𠃣	𠃤	𠃥	𠃦	𠃧	𠃨	𠃩	𠃪	𠃫	𠃬	𠃭	𠃮	𠃯
U+200Fx	𠃰	𠃱	𠃲	𠃳	𠃴	𠃵	𠃶	𠃷	𠃸	𠃹	𠃺	𠃻	𠃼	𠃽	𠃾	𠃿
U+2010x	𠄀	𠄁	𠄂	𠄃	𠄄	𠄅	𠄆	𠄇	𠄈	𠄉	𠄊	𠄋	𠄌	𠄍	𠄎	𠄏
U+2011x	𠄐	𠄑	𠄒	𠄓	𠄔	𠄕	𠄖	𠄗	𠄘	𠄙	𠄚	𠄛	𠄜	𠄝	𠄞	𠄟
U+2012x	𠄠	𠄡	𠄢	𠄣	𠄤	𠄥	𠄦	𠄧	𠄨	𠄩	𠄪	𠄫	𠄬	𠄭	𠄮	𠄯
U+2013x	𠄰	𠄱	𠄲	𠄳	𠄴	𠄵	𠄶	𠄷	𠄸	𠄹	𠄺	𠄻	𠄼	𠄽	𠄾	𠄿
U+2014x	𠅀	𠅁	𠅂	𠅃	𠅄	𠅅	𠅆	𠅇	𠅈	𠅉	𠅊	𠅋	𠅌	𠅍	𠅎	𠅏
U+2015x	𠅐	𠅑	𠅒	𠅓	𠅔	𠅕	𠅖	𠅗	𠅘	𠅙	𠅚	𠅛	𠅜	𠅝	𠅞	𠅟
U+2016x	𠅠	𠅡	𠅢	𠅣	𠅤	𠅥	𠅦	𠅧	𠅨	𠅩	𠅪	𠅫	𠅬	𠅭	𠅮	𠅯
U+2017x	𠅰	𠅱	𠅲	𠅳	𠅴	𠅵	𠅶	𠅷	𠅸	𠅹	𠅺	𠅻	𠅼	𠅽	𠅾	𠅿
U+2018x	𠆀	𠆁	𠆂	𠆃	𠆄	𠆅	𠆆	𠆇	𠆈	𠆉	𠆊	𠆋	𠆌	𠆍	𠆎	𠆏
U+2019x	𠆐	𠆑	𠆒	𠆓	𠆔	𠆕	𠆖	𠆗	𠆘	𠆙	𠆚	𠆛	𠆜	𠆝	𠆞	𠆟
U+201Ax	𠆠	𠆡	𠆢	𠆣	𠆤	𠆥	𠆦	𠆧	𠆨	𠆩	𠆪	𠆫	𠆬	𠆭	𠆮	𠆯
U+201Bx	𠆰	𠆱	𠆲	𠆳	𠆴	𠆵	𠆶	𠆷	𠆸	𠆹	𠆺	𠆻	𠆼	𠆽	𠆾	𠆿
U+201Cx	𠇀	𠇁	𠇂	𠇃	𠇄	𠇅	𠇆	𠇇	𠇈	𠇉	𠇊	𠇋	𠇌	𠇍	𠇎	𠇏
U+201Dx	𠇐	𠇑	𠇒	𠇓	𠇔	𠇕	𠇖	𠇗	𠇘	𠇙	𠇚	𠇛	𠇜	𠇝	𠇞	𠇟
U+201Ex	𠇠	𠇡	𠇢	𠇣	𠇤	𠇥	𠇦	𠇧	𠇨	𠇩	𠇪	𠇫	𠇬	𠇭	𠇮	𠇯
U+201Fx	𠇰	𠇱	𠇲	𠇳	𠇴	𠇵	𠇶	𠇷	𠇸	𠇹	𠇺	𠇻	𠇼	𠇽	𠇾	𠇿
U+2020x	𠈀	𠈁	𠈂	𠈃	𠈄	𠈅	𠈆	𠈇	𠈈	𠈉	𠈊	𠈋	𠈌	𠈍	𠈎	𠈏
U+2021x	𠈐	𠈑	𠈒	𠈓	𠈔	𠈕	𠈖	𠈗	𠈘	𠈙	𠈚	𠈛	𠈜	𠈝	𠈞	𠈟
U+2022x	𠈠	𠈡	𠈢	𠈣	𠈤	𠈥	𠈦	𠈧	𠈨	𠈩	𠈪	𠈫	𠈬	𠈭	𠈮	𠈯
U+2023x	𠈰	𠈱	𠈲	𠈳	𠈴	𠈵	𠈶	𠈷	𠈸	𠈹	𠈺	𠈻	𠈼	𠈽	𠈾	𠈿
U+2024x	𠉀	𠉁	𠉂	𠉃	𠉄	𠉅	𠉆	𠉇	𠉈	𠉉	𠉊	𠉋	𠉌	𠉍	𠉎	𠉏
U+2025x	𠉐	𠉑	𠉒	𠉓	𠉔	𠉕	𠉖	𠉗	𠉘	𠉙	𠉚	𠉛	𠉜	𠉝	𠉞	𠉟
U+2026x	𠉠	𠉡	𠉢	𠉣	𠉤	𠉥	𠉦	𠉧	𠉨	𠉩	𠉪	𠉫	𠉬	𠉭	𠉮	𠉯
U+2027x	𠉰	𠉱	𠉲	𠉳	𠉴	𠉵	𠉶	𠉷	𠉸	𠉹	𠉺	𠉻	𠉼	𠉽	𠉾	𠉿
U+2028x	𠊀	𠊁	𠊂	𠊃	𠊄	𠊅	𠊆	𠊇	𠊈	𠊉	𠊊	𠊋	𠊌	𠊍	𠊎	𠊏
U+2029x	𠊐	𠊑	𠊒	𠊓	𠊔	𠊕	𠊖	𠊗	𠊘	𠊙	𠊚	𠊛	𠊜	𠊝	𠊞	𠊟
U+202Ax	𠊠	𠊡	𠊢	𠊣	𠊤	𠊥	𠊦	𠊧	𠊨	𠊩	𠊪	𠊫	𠊬	𠊭	𠊮	𠊯
U+202Bx	𠊰	𠊱	𠊲	𠊳	𠊴	𠊵	𠊶	𠊷	𠊸	𠊹	𠊺	𠊻	𠊼	𠊽	𠊾	𠊿
U+202Cx	𠋀	𠋁	𠋂	𠋃	𠋄	𠋅	𠋆	𠋇	𠋈	𠋉	𠋊	𠋋	𠋌	𠋍	𠋎	𠋏
U+202Dx	𠋐	𠋑	𠋒	𠋓	𠋔	𠋕	𠋖	𠋗	𠋘	𠋙	𠋚	𠋛	𠋜	𠋝	𠋞	𠋟
U+202Ex	𠋠	𠋡	𠋢	𠋣	𠋤	𠋥	𠋦	𠋧	𠋨	𠋩	𠋪	𠋫	𠋬	𠋭	𠋮	𠋯
U+202Fx	𠋰	𠋱	𠋲	𠋳	𠋴	𠋵	𠋶	𠋷	𠋸	𠋹	𠋺	𠋻	𠋼	𠋽	𠋾	𠋿
U+2030x	𠌀	𠌁	𠌂	𠌃	𠌄	𠌅	𠌆	𠌇	𠌈	𠌉	𠌊	𠌋	𠌌	𠌍	𠌎	𠌏
U+2031x	𠌐	𠌑	𠌒	𠌓	𠌔	𠌕	𠌖	𠌗	𠌘	𠌙	𠌚	𠌛	𠌜	𠌝	𠌞	𠌟
U+2032x	𠌠	𠌡	𠌢	𠌣	𠌤	𠌥	𠌦	𠌧	𠌨	𠌩	𠌪	𠌫	𠌬	𠌭	𠌮	𠌯
U+2033x	𠌰	𠌱	𠌲	𠌳	𠌴	𠌵	𠌶	𠌷	𠌸	𠌹	𠌺	𠌻	𠌼	𠌽	𠌾	𠌿
U+2034x	𠍀	𠍁	𠍂	𠍃	𠍄	𠍅	𠍆	𠍇	𠍈	𠍉	𠍊	𠍋	𠍌	𠍍	𠍎	𠍏
U+2035x	𠍐	𠍑	𠍒	𠍓	𠍔	𠍕	𠍖	𠍗	𠍘	𠍙	𠍚	𠍛	𠍜	𠍝	𠍞	𠍟
U+2036x	𠍠	𠍡	𠍢	𠍣	𠍤	𠍥	𠍦	𠍧	𠍨	𠍩	𠍪	𠍫	𠍬	𠍭	𠍮	𠍯
U+2037x	𠍰	𠍱	𠍲	𠍳	𠍴	𠍵	𠍶	𠍷	𠍸	𠍹	𠍺	𠍻	𠍼	𠍽	𠍾	𠍿
U+2038x	𠎀	𠎁	𠎂	𠎃	𠎄	𠎅	𠎆	𠎇	𠎈	𠎉	𠎊	𠎋	𠎌	𠎍	𠎎	𠎏
U+2039x	𠎐	𠎑	𠎒	𠎓	𠎔	𠎕	𠎖	𠎗	𠎘	𠎙	𠎚	𠎛	𠎜	𠎝	𠎞	𠎟
U+203Ax	𠎠	𠎡	𠎢	𠎣	𠎤	𠎥	𠎦	𠎧	𠎨	𠎩	𠎪	𠎫	𠎬	𠎭	𠎮	𠎯
U+203Bx	𠎰	𠎱	𠎲	𠎳	𠎴	𠎵	𠎶	𠎷	𠎸	𠎹	𠎺	𠎻	𠎼	𠎽	𠎾	𠎿
U+203Cx	𠏀	𠏁	𠏂	𠏃	𠏄	𠏅	𠏆	𠏇	𠏈	𠏉	𠏊	𠏋	𠏌	𠏍	𠏎	𠏏
U+203Dx	𠏐	𠏑	𠏒	𠏓	𠏔	𠏕	𠏖	𠏗	𠏘	𠏙	𠏚	𠏛	𠏜	𠏝	𠏞	𠏟
U+203Ex	𠏠	𠏡	𠏢	𠏣	𠏤	𠏥	𠏦	𠏧	𠏨	𠏩	𠏪	𠏫	𠏬	𠏭	𠏮	𠏯
U+203Fx	𠏰	𠏱	𠏲	𠏳	𠏴	𠏵	𠏶	𠏷	𠏸	𠏹	𠏺	𠏻	𠏼	𠏽	𠏾	𠏿
U+2040x	𠐀	𠐁	𠐂	𠐃	𠐄	𠐅	𠐆	𠐇	𠐈	𠐉	𠐊	𠐋	𠐌	𠐍	𠐎	𠐏
U+2041x	𠐐	𠐑	𠐒	𠐓	𠐔	𠐕	𠐖	𠐗	𠐘	𠐙	𠐚	𠐛	𠐜	𠐝	𠐞	𠐟
U+2042x	𠐠	𠐡	𠐢	𠐣	𠐤	𠐥	𠐦	𠐧	𠐨	𠐩	𠐪	𠐫	𠐬	𠐭	𠐮	𠐯
U+2043x	𠐰	𠐱	𠐲	𠐳	𠐴	𠐵	𠐶	𠐷	𠐸	𠐹	𠐺	𠐻	𠐼	𠐽	𠐾	𠐿
U+2044x	𠑀	𠑁	𠑂	𠑃	𠑄	𠑅	𠑆	𠑇	𠑈	𠑉	𠑊	𠑋	𠑌	𠑍	𠑎	𠑏
U+2045x	𠑐	𠑑	𠑒	𠑓	𠑔	𠑕	𠑖	𠑗	𠑘	𠑙	𠑚	𠑛	𠑜	𠑝	𠑞	𠑟
U+2046x	𠑠	𠑡	𠑢	𠑣	𠑤	𠑥	𠑦	𠑧	𠑨	𠑩	𠑪	𠑫	𠑬	𠑭	𠑮	𠑯
U+2047x	𠑰	𠑱	𠑲	𠑳	𠑴	𠑵	𠑶	𠑷	𠑸	𠑹	𠑺	𠑻	𠑼	𠑽	𠑾	𠑿
U+2048x	𠒀	𠒁	𠒂	𠒃	𠒄	𠒅	𠒆	𠒇	𠒈	𠒉	𠒊	𠒋	𠒌	𠒍	𠒎	𠒏
U+2049x	𠒐	𠒑	𠒒	𠒓	𠒔	𠒕	𠒖	𠒗	𠒘	𠒙	𠒚	𠒛	𠒜	𠒝	𠒞	𠒟
U+204Ax	𠒠	𠒡	𠒢	𠒣	𠒤	𠒥	𠒦	𠒧	𠒨	𠒩	𠒪	𠒫	𠒬	𠒭	𠒮	𠒯
U+204Bx	𠒰	𠒱	𠒲	𠒳	𠒴	𠒵	𠒶	𠒷	𠒸	𠒹	𠒺	𠒻	𠒼	𠒽	𠒾	𠒿
U+204Cx	𠓀	𠓁	𠓂	𠓃	𠓄	𠓅	𠓆	𠓇	𠓈	𠓉	𠓊	𠓋	𠓌	𠓍	𠓎	𠓏
U+204Dx	𠓐	𠓑	𠓒	𠓓	𠓔	𠓕	𠓖	𠓗	𠓘	𠓙	𠓚	𠓛	𠓜	𠓝	𠓞	𠓟
U+204Ex	𠓠	𠓡	𠓢	𠓣	𠓤	𠓥	𠓦	𠓧	𠓨	𠓩	𠓪	𠓫	𠓬	𠓭	𠓮	𠓯
U+204Fx	𠓰	𠓱	𠓲	𠓳	𠓴	𠓵	𠓶	𠓷	𠓸	𠓹	𠓺	𠓻	𠓼	𠓽	𠓾	𠓿
U+2050x	𠔀	𠔁	𠔂	𠔃	𠔄	𠔅	𠔆	𠔇	𠔈	𠔉	𠔊	𠔋	𠔌	𠔍	𠔎	𠔏
U+2051x	𠔐	𠔑	𠔒	𠔓	𠔔	𠔕	𠔖	𠔗	𠔘	𠔙	𠔚	𠔛	𠔜	𠔝	𠔞	𠔟
U+2052x	𠔠	𠔡	𠔢	𠔣	𠔤	𠔥	𠔦	𠔧	𠔨	𠔩	𠔪	𠔫	𠔬	𠔭	𠔮	𠔯
U+2053x	𠔰	𠔱	𠔲	𠔳	𠔴	𠔵	𠔶	𠔷	𠔸	𠔹	𠔺	𠔻	𠔼	𠔽	𠔾	𠔿
U+2054x	𠕀	𠕁	𠕂	𠕃	𠕄	𠕅	𠕆	𠕇	𠕈	𠕉	𠕊	𠕋	𠕌	𠕍	𠕎	𠕏
U+2055x	𠕐	𠕑	𠕒	𠕓	𠕔	𠕕	𠕖	𠕗	𠕘	𠕙	𠕚	𠕛	𠕜	𠕝	𠕞	𠕟
U+2056x	𠕠	𠕡	𠕢	𠕣	𠕤	𠕥	𠕦	𠕧	𠕨	𠕩	𠕪	𠕫	𠕬	𠕭	𠕮	𠕯
U+2057x	𠕰	𠕱	𠕲	𠕳	𠕴	𠕵	𠕶	𠕷	𠕸	𠕹	𠕺	𠕻	𠕼	𠕽	𠕾	𠕿
U+2058x	𠖀	𠖁	𠖂	𠖃	𠖄	𠖅	𠖆	𠖇	𠖈	𠖉	𠖊	𠖋	𠖌	𠖍	𠖎	𠖏
U+2059x	𠖐	𠖑	𠖒	𠖓	𠖔	𠖕	𠖖	𠖗	𠖘	𠖙	𠖚	𠖛	𠖜	𠖝	𠖞	𠖟
U+205Ax	𠖠	𠖡	𠖢	𠖣	𠖤	𠖥	𠖦	𠖧	𠖨	𠖩	𠖪	𠖫	𠖬	𠖭	𠖮	𠖯
U+205Bx	𠖰	𠖱	𠖲	𠖳	𠖴	𠖵	𠖶	𠖷	𠖸	𠖹	𠖺	𠖻	𠖼	𠖽	𠖾	𠖿
U+205Cx	𠗀	𠗁	𠗂	𠗃	𠗄	𠗅	𠗆	𠗇	𠗈	𠗉	𠗊	𠗋	𠗌	𠗍	𠗎	𠗏
U+205Dx	𠗐	𠗑	𠗒	𠗓	𠗔	𠗕	𠗖	𠗗	𠗘	𠗙	𠗚	𠗛	𠗜	𠗝	𠗞	𠗟
U+205Ex	𠗠	𠗡	𠗢	𠗣	𠗤	𠗥	𠗦	𠗧	𠗨	𠗩	𠗪	𠗫	𠗬	𠗭	𠗮	𠗯
U+205Fx	𠗰	𠗱	𠗲	𠗳	𠗴	𠗵	𠗶	𠗷	𠗸	𠗹	𠗺	𠗻	𠗼	𠗽	𠗾	𠗿
U+2060x	𠘀	𠘁	𠘂	𠘃	𠘄	𠘅	𠘆	𠘇	𠘈	𠘉	𠘊	𠘋	𠘌	𠘍	𠘎	𠘏
U+2061x	𠘐	𠘑	𠘒	𠘓	𠘔	𠘕	𠘖	𠘗	𠘘	𠘙	𠘚	𠘛	𠘜	𠘝	𠘞	𠘟
U+2062x	𠘠	𠘡	𠘢	𠘣	𠘤	𠘥	𠘦	𠘧	𠘨	𠘩	𠘪	𠘫	𠘬	𠘭	𠘮	𠘯
U+2063x	𠘰	𠘱	𠘲	𠘳	𠘴	𠘵	𠘶	𠘷	𠘸	𠘹	𠘺	𠘻	𠘼	𠘽	𠘾	𠘿
U+2064x	𠙀	𠙁	𠙂	𠙃	𠙄	𠙅	𠙆	𠙇	𠙈	𠙉	𠙊	𠙋	𠙌	𠙍	𠙎	𠙏
U+2065x	𠙐	𠙑	𠙒	𠙓	𠙔	𠙕	𠙖	𠙗	𠙘	𠙙	𠙚	𠙛	𠙜	𠙝	𠙞	𠙟
U+2066x	𠙠	𠙡	𠙢	𠙣	𠙤	𠙥	𠙦	𠙧	𠙨	𠙩	𠙪	𠙫	𠙬	𠙭	𠙮	𠙯
U+2067x	𠙰	𠙱	𠙲	𠙳	𠙴	𠙵	𠙶	𠙷	𠙸	𠙹	𠙺	𠙻	𠙼	𠙽	𠙾	𠙿
U+2068x	𠚀	𠚁	𠚂	𠚃	𠚄	𠚅	𠚆	𠚇	𠚈	𠚉	𠚊	𠚋	𠚌	𠚍	𠚎	𠚏
U+2069x	𠚐	𠚑	𠚒	𠚓	𠚔	𠚕	𠚖	𠚗	𠚘	𠚙	𠚚	𠚛	𠚜	𠚝	𠚞	𠚟
U+206Ax	𠚠	𠚡	𠚢	𠚣	𠚤	𠚥	𠚦	𠚧	𠚨	𠚩	𠚪	𠚫	𠚬	𠚭	𠚮	𠚯
U+206Bx	𠚰	𠚱	𠚲	𠚳	𠚴	𠚵	𠚶	𠚷	𠚸	𠚹	𠚺	𠚻	𠚼	𠚽	𠚾	𠚿
U+206Cx	𠛀	𠛁	𠛂	𠛃	𠛄	𠛅	𠛆	𠛇	𠛈	𠛉	𠛊	𠛋	𠛌	𠛍	𠛎	𠛏
U+206Dx	𠛐	𠛑	𠛒	𠛓	𠛔	𠛕	𠛖	𠛗	𠛘	𠛙	𠛚	𠛛	𠛜	𠛝	𠛞	𠛟
U+206Ex	𠛠	𠛡	𠛢	𠛣	𠛤	𠛥	𠛦	𠛧	𠛨	𠛩	𠛪	𠛫	𠛬	𠛭	𠛮	𠛯
U+206Fx	𠛰	𠛱	𠛲	𠛳	𠛴	𠛵	𠛶	𠛷	𠛸	𠛹	𠛺	𠛻	𠛼	𠛽	𠛾	𠛿
U+2070x	𠜀	𠜁	𠜂	𠜃	𠜄	𠜅	𠜆	𠜇	𠜈	𠜉	𠜊	𠜋	𠜌	𠜍	𠜎	𠜏
U+2071x	𠜐	𠜑	𠜒	𠜓	𠜔	𠜕	𠜖	𠜗	𠜘	𠜙	𠜚	𠜛	𠜜	𠜝	𠜞	𠜟
U+2072x	𠜠	𠜡	𠜢	𠜣	𠜤	𠜥	𠜦	𠜧	𠜨	𠜩	𠜪	𠜫	𠜬	𠜭	𠜮	𠜯
U+2073x	𠜰	𠜱	𠜲	𠜳	𠜴	𠜵	𠜶	𠜷	𠜸	𠜹	𠜺	𠜻	𠜼	𠜽	𠜾	𠜿
U+2074x	𠝀	𠝁	𠝂	𠝃	𠝄	𠝅	𠝆	𠝇	𠝈	𠝉	𠝊	𠝋	𠝌	𠝍	𠝎	𠝏
U+2075x	𠝐	𠝑	𠝒	𠝓	𠝔	𠝕	𠝖	𠝗	𠝘	𠝙	𠝚	𠝛	𠝜	𠝝	𠝞	𠝟
U+2076x	𠝠	𠝡	𠝢	𠝣	𠝤	𠝥	𠝦	𠝧	𠝨	𠝩	𠝪	𠝫	𠝬	𠝭	𠝮	𠝯
U+2077x	𠝰	𠝱	𠝲	𠝳	𠝴	𠝵	𠝶	𠝷	𠝸	𠝹	𠝺	𠝻	𠝼	𠝽	𠝾	𠝿
U+2078x	𠞀	𠞁	𠞂	𠞃	𠞄	𠞅	𠞆	𠞇	𠞈	𠞉	𠞊	𠞋	𠞌	𠞍	𠞎	𠞏
U+2079x	𠞐	𠞑	𠞒	𠞓	𠞔	𠞕	𠞖	𠞗	𠞘	𠞙	𠞚	𠞛	𠞜	𠞝	𠞞	𠞟
U+207Ax	𠞠	𠞡	𠞢	𠞣	𠞤	𠞥	𠞦	𠞧	𠞨	𠞩	𠞪	𠞫	𠞬	𠞭	𠞮	𠞯
U+207Bx	𠞰	𠞱	𠞲	𠞳	𠞴	𠞵	𠞶	𠞷	𠞸	𠞹	𠞺	𠞻	𠞼	𠞽	𠞾	𠞿
U+207Cx	𠟀	𠟁	𠟂	𠟃	𠟄	𠟅	𠟆	𠟇	𠟈	𠟉	𠟊	𠟋	𠟌	𠟍	𠟎	𠟏
U+207Dx	𠟐	𠟑	𠟒	𠟓	𠟔	𠟕	𠟖	𠟗	𠟘	𠟙	𠟚	𠟛	𠟜	𠟝	𠟞	𠟟
U+207Ex	𠟠	𠟡	𠟢	𠟣	𠟤	𠟥	𠟦	𠟧	𠟨	𠟩	𠟪	𠟫	𠟬	𠟭	𠟮	𠟯
U+207Fx	𠟰	𠟱	𠟲	𠟳	𠟴	𠟵	𠟶	𠟷	𠟸	𠟹	𠟺	𠟻	𠟼	𠟽	𠟾	𠟿
U+2080x	𠠀	𠠁	𠠂	𠠃	𠠄	𠠅	𠠆	𠠇	𠠈	𠠉	𠠊	𠠋	𠠌	𠠍	𠠎	𠠏
U+2081x	𠠐	𠠑	𠠒	𠠓	𠠔	𠠕	𠠖	𠠗	𠠘	𠠙	𠠚	𠠛	𠠜	𠠝	𠠞	𠠟
U+2082x	𠠠	𠠡	𠠢	𠠣	𠠤	𠠥	𠠦	𠠧	𠠨	𠠩	𠠪	𠠫	𠠬	𠠭	𠠮	𠠯
U+2083x	𠠰	𠠱	𠠲	𠠳	𠠴	𠠵	𠠶	𠠷	𠠸	𠠹	𠠺	𠠻	𠠼	𠠽	𠠾	𠠿
U+2084x	𠡀	𠡁	𠡂	𠡃	𠡄	𠡅	𠡆	𠡇	𠡈	𠡉	𠡊	𠡋	𠡌	𠡍	𠡎	𠡏
U+2085x	𠡐	𠡑	𠡒	𠡓	𠡔	𠡕	𠡖	𠡗	𠡘	𠡙	𠡚	𠡛	𠡜	𠡝	𠡞	𠡟
U+2086x	𠡠	𠡡	𠡢	𠡣	𠡤	𠡥	𠡦	𠡧	𠡨	𠡩	𠡪	𠡫	𠡬	𠡭	𠡮	𠡯
U+2087x	𠡰	𠡱	𠡲	𠡳	𠡴	𠡵	𠡶	𠡷	𠡸	𠡹	𠡺	𠡻	𠡼	𠡽	𠡾	𠡿
U+2088x	𠢀	𠢁	𠢂	𠢃	𠢄	𠢅	𠢆	𠢇	𠢈	𠢉	𠢊	𠢋	𠢌	𠢍	𠢎	𠢏
U+2089x	𠢐	𠢑	𠢒	𠢓	𠢔	𠢕	𠢖	𠢗	𠢘	𠢙	𠢚	𠢛	𠢜	𠢝	𠢞	𠢟
U+208Ax	𠢠	𠢡	𠢢	𠢣	𠢤	𠢥	𠢦	𠢧	𠢨	𠢩	𠢪	𠢫	𠢬	𠢭	𠢮	𠢯
U+208Bx	𠢰	𠢱	𠢲	𠢳	𠢴	𠢵	𠢶	𠢷	𠢸	𠢹	𠢺	𠢻	𠢼	𠢽	𠢾	𠢿
U+208Cx	𠣀	𠣁	𠣂	𠣃	𠣄	𠣅	𠣆	𠣇	𠣈	𠣉	𠣊	𠣋	𠣌	𠣍	𠣎	𠣏
U+208Dx	𠣐	𠣑	𠣒	𠣓	𠣔	𠣕	𠣖	𠣗	𠣘	𠣙	𠣚	𠣛	𠣜	𠣝	𠣞	𠣟
U+208Ex	𠣠	𠣡	𠣢	𠣣	𠣤	𠣥	𠣦	𠣧	𠣨	𠣩	𠣪	𠣫	𠣬	𠣭	𠣮	𠣯
U+208Fx	𠣰	𠣱	𠣲	𠣳	𠣴	𠣵	𠣶	𠣷	𠣸	𠣹	𠣺	𠣻	𠣼	𠣽	𠣾	𠣿
U+2090x	𠤀	𠤁	𠤂	𠤃	𠤄	𠤅	𠤆	𠤇	𠤈	𠤉	𠤊	𠤋	𠤌	𠤍	𠤎	𠤏
U+2091x	𠤐	𠤑	𠤒	𠤓	𠤔	𠤕	𠤖	𠤗	𠤘	𠤙	𠤚	𠤛	𠤜	𠤝	𠤞	𠤟
U+2092x	𠤠	𠤡	𠤢	𠤣	𠤤	𠤥	𠤦	𠤧	𠤨	𠤩	𠤪	𠤫	𠤬	𠤭	𠤮	𠤯
U+2093x	𠤰	𠤱	𠤲	𠤳	𠤴	𠤵	𠤶	𠤷	𠤸	𠤹	𠤺	𠤻	𠤼	𠤽	𠤾	𠤿
U+2094x	𠥀	𠥁	𠥂	𠥃	𠥄	𠥅	𠥆	𠥇	𠥈	𠥉	𠥊	𠥋	𠥌	𠥍	𠥎	𠥏
U+2095x	𠥐	𠥑	𠥒	𠥓	𠥔	𠥕	𠥖	𠥗	𠥘	𠥙	𠥚	𠥛	𠥜	𠥝	𠥞	𠥟
U+2096x	𠥠	𠥡	𠥢	𠥣	𠥤	𠥥	𠥦	𠥧	𠥨	𠥩	𠥪	𠥫	𠥬	𠥭	𠥮	𠥯
U+2097x	𠥰	𠥱	𠥲	𠥳	𠥴	𠥵	𠥶	𠥷	𠥸	𠥹	𠥺	𠥻	𠥼	𠥽	𠥾	𠥿
U+2098x	𠦀	𠦁	𠦂	𠦃	𠦄	𠦅	𠦆	𠦇	𠦈	𠦉	𠦊	𠦋	𠦌	𠦍	𠦎	𠦏
U+2099x	𠦐	𠦑	𠦒	𠦓	𠦔	𠦕	𠦖	𠦗	𠦘	𠦙	𠦚	𠦛	𠦜	𠦝	𠦞	𠦟
U+209Ax	𠦠	𠦡	𠦢	𠦣	𠦤	𠦥	𠦦	𠦧	𠦨	𠦩	𠦪	𠦫	𠦬	𠦭	𠦮	𠦯
U+209Bx	𠦰	𠦱	𠦲	𠦳	𠦴	𠦵	𠦶	𠦷	𠦸	𠦹	𠦺	𠦻	𠦼	𠦽	𠦾	𠦿
U+209Cx	𠧀	𠧁	𠧂	𠧃	𠧄	𠧅	𠧆	𠧇	𠧈	𠧉	𠧊	𠧋	𠧌	𠧍	𠧎	𠧏
U+209Dx	𠧐	𠧑	𠧒	𠧓	𠧔	𠧕	𠧖	𠧗	𠧘	𠧙	𠧚	𠧛	𠧜	𠧝	𠧞	𠧟
U+209Ex	𠧠	𠧡	𠧢	𠧣	𠧤	𠧥	𠧦	𠧧	𠧨	𠧩	𠧪	𠧫	𠧬	𠧭	𠧮	𠧯
U+209Fx	𠧰	𠧱	𠧲	𠧳	𠧴	𠧵	𠧶	𠧷	𠧸	𠧹	𠧺	𠧻	𠧼	𠧽	𠧾	𠧿
U+20A0x	𠨀	𠨁	𠨂	𠨃	𠨄	𠨅	𠨆	𠨇	𠨈	𠨉	𠨊	𠨋	𠨌	𠨍	𠨎	𠨏
U+20A1x	𠨐	𠨑	𠨒	𠨓	𠨔	𠨕	𠨖	𠨗	𠨘	𠨙	𠨚	𠨛	𠨜	𠨝	𠨞	𠨟
U+20A2x	𠨠	𠨡	𠨢	𠨣	𠨤	𠨥	𠨦	𠨧	𠨨	𠨩	𠨪	𠨫	𠨬	𠨭	𠨮	𠨯
U+20A3x	𠨰	𠨱	𠨲	𠨳	𠨴	𠨵	𠨶	𠨷	𠨸	𠨹	𠨺	𠨻	𠨼	𠨽	𠨾	𠨿
U+20A4x	𠩀	𠩁	𠩂	𠩃	𠩄	𠩅	𠩆	𠩇	𠩈	𠩉	𠩊	𠩋	𠩌	𠩍	𠩎	𠩏
U+20A5x	𠩐	𠩑	𠩒	𠩓	𠩔	𠩕	𠩖	𠩗	𠩘	𠩙	𠩚	𠩛	𠩜	𠩝	𠩞	𠩟
U+20A6x	𠩠	𠩡	𠩢	𠩣	𠩤	𠩥	𠩦	𠩧	𠩨	𠩩	𠩪	𠩫	𠩬	𠩭	𠩮	𠩯
U+20A7x	𠩰	𠩱	𠩲	𠩳	𠩴	𠩵	𠩶	𠩷	𠩸	𠩹	𠩺	𠩻	𠩼	𠩽	𠩾	𠩿
U+20A8x	𠪀	𠪁	𠪂	𠪃	𠪄	𠪅	𠪆	𠪇	𠪈	𠪉	𠪊	𠪋	𠪌	𠪍	𠪎	𠪏
U+20A9x	𠪐	𠪑	𠪒	𠪓	𠪔	𠪕	𠪖	𠪗	𠪘	𠪙	𠪚	𠪛	𠪜	𠪝	𠪞	𠪟
U+20AAx	𠪠	𠪡	𠪢	𠪣	𠪤	𠪥	𠪦	𠪧	𠪨	𠪩	𠪪	𠪫	𠪬	𠪭	𠪮	𠪯
U+20ABx	𠪰	𠪱	𠪲	𠪳	𠪴	𠪵	𠪶	𠪷	𠪸	𠪹	𠪺	𠪻	𠪼	𠪽	𠪾	𠪿
U+20ACx	𠫀	𠫁	𠫂	𠫃	𠫄	𠫅	𠫆	𠫇	𠫈	𠫉	𠫊	𠫋	𠫌	𠫍	𠫎	𠫏
U+20ADx	𠫐	𠫑	𠫒	𠫓	𠫔	𠫕	𠫖	𠫗	𠫘	𠫙	𠫚	𠫛	𠫜	𠫝	𠫞	𠫟
U+20AEx	𠫠	𠫡	𠫢	𠫣	𠫤	𠫥	𠫦	𠫧	𠫨	𠫩	𠫪	𠫫	𠫬	𠫭	𠫮	𠫯
U+20AFx	𠫰	𠫱	𠫲	𠫳	𠫴	𠫵	𠫶	𠫷	𠫸	𠫹	𠫺	𠫻	𠫼	𠫽	𠫾	𠫿
U+20B0x	𠬀	𠬁	𠬂	𠬃	𠬄	𠬅	𠬆	𠬇	𠬈	𠬉	𠬊	𠬋	𠬌	𠬍	𠬎	𠬏
U+20B1x	𠬐	𠬑	𠬒	𠬓	𠬔	𠬕	𠬖	𠬗	𠬘	𠬙	𠬚	𠬛	𠬜	𠬝	𠬞	𠬟
U+20B2x	𠬠	𠬡	𠬢	𠬣	𠬤	𠬥	𠬦	𠬧	𠬨	𠬩	𠬪	𠬫	𠬬	𠬭	𠬮	𠬯
U+20B3x	𠬰	𠬱	𠬲	𠬳	𠬴	𠬵	𠬶	𠬷	𠬸	𠬹	𠬺	𠬻	𠬼	𠬽	𠬾	𠬿
U+20B4x	𠭀	𠭁	𠭂	𠭃	𠭄	𠭅	𠭆	𠭇	𠭈	𠭉	𠭊	𠭋	𠭌	𠭍	𠭎	𠭏
U+20B5x	𠭐	𠭑	𠭒	𠭓	𠭔	𠭕	𠭖	𠭗	𠭘	𠭙	𠭚	𠭛	𠭜	𠭝	𠭞	𠭟
U+20B6x	𠭠	𠭡	𠭢	𠭣	𠭤	𠭥	𠭦	𠭧	𠭨	𠭩	𠭪	𠭫	𠭬	𠭭	𠭮	𠭯
U+20B7x	𠭰	𠭱	𠭲	𠭳	𠭴	𠭵	𠭶	𠭷	𠭸	𠭹	𠭺	𠭻	𠭼	𠭽	𠭾	𠭿
U+20B8x	𠮀	𠮁	𠮂	𠮃	𠮄	𠮅	𠮆	𠮇	𠮈	𠮉	𠮊	𠮋	𠮌	𠮍	𠮎	𠮏
U+20B9x	𠮐	𠮑	𠮒	𠮓	𠮔	𠮕	𠮖	𠮗	𠮘	𠮙	𠮚	𠮛	𠮜	𠮝	𠮞	𠮟
U+20BAx	𠮠	𠮡	𠮢	𠮣	𠮤	𠮥	𠮦	𠮧	𠮨	𠮩	𠮪	𠮫	𠮬	𠮭	𠮮	𠮯
U+20BBx	𠮰	𠮱	𠮲	𠮳	𠮴	𠮵	𠮶	𠮷	𠮸	𠮹	𠮺	𠮻	𠮼	𠮽	𠮾	𠮿
U+20BCx	𠯀	𠯁	𠯂	𠯃	𠯄	𠯅	𠯆	𠯇	𠯈	𠯉	𠯊	𠯋	𠯌	𠯍	𠯎	𠯏
U+20BDx	𠯐	𠯑	𠯒	𠯓	𠯔	𠯕	𠯖	𠯗	𠯘	𠯙	𠯚	𠯛	𠯜	𠯝	𠯞	𠯟
U+20BEx	𠯠	𠯡	𠯢	𠯣	𠯤	𠯥	𠯦	𠯧	𠯨	𠯩	𠯪	𠯫	𠯬	𠯭	𠯮	𠯯
U+20BFx	𠯰	𠯱	𠯲	𠯳	𠯴	𠯵	𠯶	𠯷	𠯸	𠯹	𠯺	𠯻	𠯼	𠯽	𠯾	𠯿
U+20C0x	𠰀	𠰁	𠰂	𠰃	𠰄	𠰅	𠰆	𠰇	𠰈	𠰉	𠰊	𠰋	𠰌	𠰍	𠰎	𠰏
U+20C1x	𠰐	𠰑	𠰒	𠰓	𠰔	𠰕	𠰖	𠰗	𠰘	𠰙	𠰚	𠰛	𠰜	𠰝	𠰞	𠰟
U+20C2x	𠰠	𠰡	𠰢	𠰣	𠰤	𠰥	𠰦	𠰧	𠰨	𠰩	𠰪	𠰫	𠰬	𠰭	𠰮	𠰯
U+20C3x	𠰰	𠰱	𠰲	𠰳	𠰴	𠰵	𠰶	𠰷	𠰸	𠰹	𠰺	𠰻	𠰼	𠰽	𠰾	𠰿
U+20C4x	𠱀	𠱁	𠱂	𠱃	𠱄	𠱅	𠱆	𠱇	𠱈	𠱉	𠱊	𠱋	𠱌	𠱍	𠱎	𠱏
U+20C5x	𠱐	𠱑	𠱒	𠱓	𠱔	𠱕	𠱖	𠱗	𠱘	𠱙	𠱚	𠱛	𠱜	𠱝	𠱞	𠱟
U+20C6x	𠱠	𠱡	𠱢	𠱣	𠱤	𠱥	𠱦	𠱧	𠱨	𠱩	𠱪	𠱫	𠱬	𠱭	𠱮	𠱯
U+20C7x	𠱰	𠱱	𠱲	𠱳	𠱴	𠱵	𠱶	𠱷	𠱸	𠱹	𠱺	𠱻	𠱼	𠱽	𠱾	𠱿
U+20C8x	𠲀	𠲁	𠲂	𠲃	𠲄	𠲅	𠲆	𠲇	𠲈	𠲉	𠲊	𠲋	𠲌	𠲍	𠲎	𠲏
U+20C9x	𠲐	𠲑	𠲒	𠲓	𠲔	𠲕	𠲖	𠲗	𠲘	𠲙	𠲚	𠲛	𠲜	𠲝	𠲞	𠲟
U+20CAx	𠲠	𠲡	𠲢	𠲣	𠲤	𠲥	𠲦	𠲧	𠲨	𠲩	𠲪	𠲫	𠲬	𠲭	𠲮	𠲯
U+20CBx	𠲰	𠲱	𠲲	𠲳	𠲴	𠲵	𠲶	𠲷	𠲸	𠲹	𠲺	𠲻	𠲼	𠲽	𠲾	𠲿
U+20CCx	𠳀	𠳁	𠳂	𠳃	𠳄	𠳅	𠳆	𠳇	𠳈	𠳉	𠳊	𠳋	𠳌	𠳍	𠳎	𠳏
U+20CDx	𠳐	𠳑	𠳒	𠳓	𠳔	𠳕	𠳖	𠳗	𠳘	𠳙	𠳚	𠳛	𠳜	𠳝	𠳞	𠳟
U+20CEx	𠳠	𠳡	𠳢	𠳣	𠳤	𠳥	𠳦	𠳧	𠳨	𠳩	𠳪	𠳫	𠳬	𠳭	𠳮	𠳯
U+20CFx	𠳰	𠳱	𠳲	𠳳	𠳴	𠳵	𠳶	𠳷	𠳸	𠳹	𠳺	𠳻	𠳼	𠳽	𠳾	𠳿
U+20D0x	𠴀	𠴁	𠴂	𠴃	𠴄	𠴅	𠴆	𠴇	𠴈	𠴉	𠴊	𠴋	𠴌	𠴍	𠴎	𠴏
U+20D1x	𠴐	𠴑	𠴒	𠴓	𠴔	𠴕	𠴖	𠴗	𠴘	𠴙	𠴚	𠴛	𠴜	𠴝	𠴞	𠴟
U+20D2x	𠴠	𠴡	𠴢	𠴣	𠴤	𠴥	𠴦	𠴧	𠴨	𠴩	𠴪	𠴫	𠴬	𠴭	𠴮	𠴯
U+20D3x	𠴰	𠴱	𠴲	𠴳	𠴴	𠴵	𠴶	𠴷	𠴸	𠴹	𠴺	𠴻	𠴼	𠴽	𠴾	𠴿
U+20D4x	𠵀	𠵁	𠵂	𠵃	𠵄	𠵅	𠵆	𠵇	𠵈	𠵉	𠵊	𠵋	𠵌	𠵍	𠵎	𠵏
U+20D5x	𠵐	𠵑	𠵒	𠵓	𠵔	𠵕	𠵖	𠵗	𠵘	𠵙	𠵚	𠵛	𠵜	𠵝	𠵞	𠵟
U+20D6x	𠵠	𠵡	𠵢	𠵣	𠵤	𠵥	𠵦	𠵧	𠵨	𠵩	𠵪	𠵫	𠵬	𠵭	𠵮	𠵯
U+20D7x	𠵰	𠵱	𠵲	𠵳	𠵴	𠵵	𠵶	𠵷	𠵸	𠵹	𠵺	𠵻	𠵼	𠵽	𠵾	𠵿
U+20D8x	𠶀	𠶁	𠶂	𠶃	𠶄	𠶅	𠶆	𠶇	𠶈	𠶉	𠶊	𠶋	𠶌	𠶍	𠶎	𠶏
U+20D9x	𠶐	𠶑	𠶒	𠶓	𠶔	𠶕	𠶖	𠶗	𠶘	𠶙	𠶚	𠶛	𠶜	𠶝	𠶞	𠶟
U+20DAx	𠶠	𠶡	𠶢	𠶣	𠶤	𠶥	𠶦	𠶧	𠶨	𠶩	𠶪	𠶫	𠶬	𠶭	𠶮	𠶯
U+20DBx	𠶰	𠶱	𠶲	𠶳	𠶴	𠶵	𠶶	𠶷	𠶸	𠶹	𠶺	𠶻	𠶼	𠶽	𠶾	𠶿
U+20DCx	𠷀	𠷁	𠷂	𠷃	𠷄	𠷅	𠷆	𠷇	𠷈	𠷉	𠷊	𠷋	𠷌	𠷍	𠷎	𠷏
U+20DDx	𠷐	𠷑	𠷒	𠷓	𠷔	𠷕	𠷖	𠷗	𠷘	𠷙	𠷚	𠷛	𠷜	𠷝	𠷞	𠷟
U+20DEx	𠷠	𠷡	𠷢	𠷣	𠷤	𠷥	𠷦	𠷧	𠷨	𠷩	𠷪	𠷫	𠷬	𠷭	𠷮	𠷯
U+20DFx	𠷰	𠷱	𠷲	𠷳	𠷴	𠷵	𠷶	𠷷	𠷸	𠷹	𠷺	𠷻	𠷼	𠷽	𠷾	𠷿
U+20E0x	𠸀	𠸁	𠸂	𠸃	𠸄	𠸅	𠸆	𠸇	𠸈	𠸉	𠸊	𠸋	𠸌	𠸍	𠸎	𠸏
U+20E1x	𠸐	𠸑	𠸒	𠸓	𠸔	𠸕	𠸖	𠸗	𠸘	𠸙	𠸚	𠸛	𠸜	𠸝	𠸞	𠸟
U+20E2x	𠸠	𠸡	𠸢	𠸣	𠸤	𠸥	𠸦	𠸧	𠸨	𠸩	𠸪	𠸫	𠸬	𠸭	𠸮	𠸯
U+20E3x	𠸰	𠸱	𠸲	𠸳	𠸴	𠸵	𠸶	𠸷	𠸸	𠸹	𠸺	𠸻	𠸼	𠸽	𠸾	𠸿
U+20E4x	𠹀	𠹁	𠹂	𠹃	𠹄	𠹅	𠹆	𠹇	𠹈	𠹉	𠹊	𠹋	𠹌	𠹍	𠹎	𠹏
U+20E5x	𠹐	𠹑	𠹒	𠹓	𠹔	𠹕	𠹖	𠹗	𠹘	𠹙	𠹚	𠹛	𠹜	𠹝	𠹞	𠹟
U+20E6x	𠹠	𠹡	𠹢	𠹣	𠹤	𠹥	𠹦	𠹧	𠹨	𠹩	𠹪	𠹫	𠹬	𠹭	𠹮	𠹯
U+20E7x	𠹰	𠹱	𠹲	𠹳	𠹴	𠹵	𠹶	𠹷	𠹸	𠹹	𠹺	𠹻	𠹼	𠹽	𠹾	𠹿
U+20E8x	𠺀	𠺁	𠺂	𠺃	𠺄	𠺅	𠺆	𠺇	𠺈	𠺉	𠺊	𠺋	𠺌	𠺍	𠺎	𠺏
U+20E9x	𠺐	𠺑	𠺒	𠺓	𠺔	𠺕	𠺖	𠺗	𠺘	𠺙	𠺚	𠺛	𠺜	𠺝	𠺞	𠺟
U+20EAx	𠺠	𠺡	𠺢	𠺣	𠺤	𠺥	𠺦	𠺧	𠺨	𠺩	𠺪	𠺫	𠺬	𠺭	𠺮	𠺯
U+20EBx	𠺰	𠺱	𠺲	𠺳	𠺴	𠺵	𠺶	𠺷	𠺸	𠺹	𠺺	𠺻	𠺼	𠺽	𠺾	𠺿
U+20ECx	𠻀	𠻁	𠻂	𠻃	𠻄	𠻅	𠻆	𠻇	𠻈	𠻉	𠻊	𠻋	𠻌	𠻍	𠻎	𠻏
U+20EDx	𠻐	𠻑	𠻒	𠻓	𠻔	𠻕	𠻖	𠻗	𠻘	𠻙	𠻚	𠻛	𠻜	𠻝	𠻞	𠻟
U+20EEx	𠻠	𠻡	𠻢	𠻣	𠻤	𠻥	𠻦	𠻧	𠻨	𠻩	𠻪	𠻫	𠻬	𠻭	𠻮	𠻯
U+20EFx	𠻰	𠻱	𠻲	𠻳	𠻴	𠻵	𠻶	𠻷	𠻸	𠻹	𠻺	𠻻	𠻼	𠻽	𠻾	𠻿
U+20F0x	𠼀	𠼁	𠼂	𠼃	𠼄	𠼅	𠼆	𠼇	𠼈	𠼉	𠼊	𠼋	𠼌	𠼍	𠼎	𠼏
U+20F1x	𠼐	𠼑	𠼒	𠼓	𠼔	𠼕	𠼖	𠼗	𠼘	𠼙	𠼚	𠼛	𠼜	𠼝	𠼞	𠼟
U+20F2x	𠼠	𠼡	𠼢	𠼣	𠼤	𠼥	𠼦	𠼧	𠼨	𠼩	𠼪	𠼫	𠼬	𠼭	𠼮	𠼯
U+20F3x	𠼰	𠼱	𠼲	𠼳	𠼴	𠼵	𠼶	𠼷	𠼸	𠼹	𠼺	𠼻	𠼼	𠼽	𠼾	𠼿
U+20F4x	𠽀	𠽁	𠽂	𠽃	𠽄	𠽅	𠽆	𠽇	𠽈	𠽉	𠽊	𠽋	𠽌	𠽍	𠽎	𠽏
U+20F5x	𠽐	𠽑	𠽒	𠽓	𠽔	𠽕	𠽖	𠽗	𠽘	𠽙	𠽚	𠽛	𠽜	𠽝	𠽞	𠽟
U+20F6x	𠽠	𠽡	𠽢	𠽣	𠽤	𠽥	𠽦	𠽧	𠽨	𠽩	𠽪	𠽫	𠽬	𠽭	𠽮	𠽯
U+20F7x	𠽰	𠽱	𠽲	𠽳	𠽴	𠽵	𠽶	𠽷	𠽸	𠽹	𠽺	𠽻	𠽼	𠽽	𠽾	𠽿
U+20F8x	𠾀	𠾁	𠾂	𠾃	𠾄	𠾅	𠾆	𠾇	𠾈	𠾉	𠾊	𠾋	𠾌	𠾍	𠾎	𠾏
U+20F9x	𠾐	𠾑	𠾒	𠾓	𠾔	𠾕	𠾖	𠾗	𠾘	𠾙	𠾚	𠾛	𠾜	𠾝	𠾞	𠾟
U+20FAx	𠾠	𠾡	𠾢	𠾣	𠾤	𠾥	𠾦	𠾧	𠾨	𠾩	𠾪	𠾫	𠾬	𠾭	𠾮	𠾯
U+20FBx	𠾰	𠾱	𠾲	𠾳	𠾴	𠾵	𠾶	𠾷	𠾸	𠾹	𠾺	𠾻	𠾼	𠾽	𠾾	𠾿
U+20FCx	𠿀	𠿁	𠿂	𠿃	𠿄	𠿅	𠿆	𠿇	𠿈	𠿉	𠿊	𠿋	𠿌	𠿍	𠿎	𠿏
U+20FDx	𠿐	𠿑	𠿒	𠿓	𠿔	𠿕	𠿖	𠿗	𠿘	𠿙	𠿚	𠿛	𠿜	𠿝	𠿞	𠿟
U+20FEx	𠿠	𠿡	𠿢	𠿣	𠿤	𠿥	𠿦	𠿧	𠿨	𠿩	𠿪	𠿫	𠿬	𠿭	𠿮	𠿯
U+20FFx	𠿰	𠿱	𠿲	𠿳	𠿴	𠿵	𠿶	𠿷	𠿸	𠿹	𠿺	𠿻	𠿼	𠿽	𠿾	𠿿
U+2100x	𡀀	𡀁	𡀂	𡀃	𡀄	𡀅	𡀆	𡀇	𡀈	𡀉	𡀊	𡀋	𡀌	𡀍	𡀎	𡀏
U+2101x	𡀐	𡀑	𡀒	𡀓	𡀔	𡀕	𡀖	𡀗	𡀘	𡀙	𡀚	𡀛	𡀜	𡀝	𡀞	𡀟
U+2102x	𡀠	𡀡	𡀢	𡀣	𡀤	𡀥	𡀦	𡀧	𡀨	𡀩	𡀪	𡀫	𡀬	𡀭	𡀮	𡀯
U+2103x	𡀰	𡀱	𡀲	𡀳	𡀴	𡀵	𡀶	𡀷	𡀸	𡀹	𡀺	𡀻	𡀼	𡀽	𡀾	𡀿
U+2104x	𡁀	𡁁	𡁂	𡁃	𡁄	𡁅	𡁆	𡁇	𡁈	𡁉	𡁊	𡁋	𡁌	𡁍	𡁎	𡁏
U+2105x	𡁐	𡁑	𡁒	𡁓	𡁔	𡁕	𡁖	𡁗	𡁘	𡁙	𡁚	𡁛	𡁜	𡁝	𡁞	𡁟
U+2106x	𡁠	𡁡	𡁢	𡁣	𡁤	𡁥	𡁦	𡁧	𡁨	𡁩	𡁪	𡁫	𡁬	𡁭	𡁮	𡁯
U+2107x	𡁰	𡁱	𡁲	𡁳	𡁴	𡁵	𡁶	𡁷	𡁸	𡁹	𡁺	𡁻	𡁼	𡁽	𡁾	𡁿
U+2108x	𡂀	𡂁	𡂂	𡂃	𡂄	𡂅	𡂆	𡂇	𡂈	𡂉	𡂊	𡂋	𡂌	𡂍	𡂎	𡂏
U+2109x	𡂐	𡂑	𡂒	𡂓	𡂔	𡂕	𡂖	𡂗	𡂘	𡂙	𡂚	𡂛	𡂜	𡂝	𡂞	𡂟
U+210Ax	𡂠	𡂡	𡂢	𡂣	𡂤	𡂥	𡂦	𡂧	𡂨	𡂩	𡂪	𡂫	𡂬	𡂭	𡂮	𡂯
U+210Bx	𡂰	𡂱	𡂲	𡂳	𡂴	𡂵	𡂶	𡂷	𡂸	𡂹	𡂺	𡂻	𡂼	𡂽	𡂾	𡂿
U+210Cx	𡃀	𡃁	𡃂	𡃃	𡃄	𡃅	𡃆	𡃇	𡃈	𡃉	𡃊	𡃋	𡃌	𡃍	𡃎	𡃏
U+210Dx	𡃐	𡃑	𡃒	𡃓	𡃔	𡃕	𡃖	𡃗	𡃘	𡃙	𡃚	𡃛	𡃜	𡃝	𡃞	𡃟
U+210Ex	𡃠	𡃡	𡃢	𡃣	𡃤	𡃥	𡃦	𡃧	𡃨	𡃩	𡃪	𡃫	𡃬	𡃭	𡃮	𡃯
U+210Fx	𡃰	𡃱	𡃲	𡃳	𡃴	𡃵	𡃶	𡃷	𡃸	𡃹	𡃺	𡃻	𡃼	𡃽	𡃾	𡃿
U+2110x	𡄀	𡄁	𡄂	𡄃	𡄄	𡄅	𡄆	𡄇	𡄈	𡄉	𡄊	𡄋	𡄌	𡄍	𡄎	𡄏
U+2111x	𡄐	𡄑	𡄒	𡄓	𡄔	𡄕	𡄖	𡄗	𡄘	𡄙	𡄚	𡄛	𡄜	𡄝	𡄞	𡄟
U+2112x	𡄠	𡄡	𡄢	𡄣	𡄤	𡄥	𡄦	𡄧	𡄨	𡄩	𡄪	𡄫	𡄬	𡄭	𡄮	𡄯
U+2113x	𡄰	𡄱	𡄲	𡄳	𡄴	𡄵	𡄶	𡄷	𡄸	𡄹	𡄺	𡄻	𡄼	𡄽	𡄾	𡄿
U+2114x	𡅀	𡅁	𡅂	𡅃	𡅄	𡅅	𡅆	𡅇	𡅈	𡅉	𡅊	𡅋	𡅌	𡅍	𡅎	𡅏
U+2115x	𡅐	𡅑	𡅒	𡅓	𡅔	𡅕	𡅖	𡅗	𡅘	𡅙	𡅚	𡅛	𡅜	𡅝	𡅞	𡅟
U+2116x	𡅠	𡅡	𡅢	𡅣	𡅤	𡅥	𡅦	𡅧	𡅨	𡅩	𡅪	𡅫	𡅬	𡅭	𡅮	𡅯
U+2117x	𡅰	𡅱	𡅲	𡅳	𡅴	𡅵	𡅶	𡅷	𡅸	𡅹	𡅺	𡅻	𡅼	𡅽	𡅾	𡅿
U+2118x	𡆀	𡆁	𡆂	𡆃	𡆄	𡆅	𡆆	𡆇	𡆈	𡆉	𡆊	𡆋	𡆌	𡆍	𡆎	𡆏
U+2119x	𡆐	𡆑	𡆒	𡆓	𡆔	𡆕	𡆖	𡆗	𡆘	𡆙	𡆚	𡆛	𡆜	𡆝	𡆞	𡆟
U+211Ax	𡆠	𡆡	𡆢	𡆣	𡆤	𡆥	𡆦	𡆧	𡆨	𡆩	𡆪	𡆫	𡆬	𡆭	𡆮	𡆯
U+211Bx	𡆰	𡆱	𡆲	𡆳	𡆴	𡆵	𡆶	𡆷	𡆸	𡆹	𡆺	𡆻	𡆼	𡆽	𡆾	𡆿
U+211Cx	𡇀	𡇁	𡇂	𡇃	𡇄	𡇅	𡇆	𡇇	𡇈	𡇉	𡇊	𡇋	𡇌	𡇍	𡇎	𡇏
U+211Dx	𡇐	𡇑	𡇒	𡇓	𡇔	𡇕	𡇖	𡇗	𡇘	𡇙	𡇚	𡇛	𡇜	𡇝	𡇞	𡇟
U+211Ex	𡇠	𡇡	𡇢	𡇣	𡇤	𡇥	𡇦	𡇧	𡇨	𡇩	𡇪	𡇫	𡇬	𡇭	𡇮	𡇯
U+211Fx	𡇰	𡇱	𡇲	𡇳	𡇴	𡇵	𡇶	𡇷	𡇸	𡇹	𡇺	𡇻	𡇼	𡇽	𡇾	𡇿
U+2120x	𡈀	𡈁	𡈂	𡈃	𡈄	𡈅	𡈆	𡈇	𡈈	𡈉	𡈊	𡈋	𡈌	𡈍	𡈎	𡈏
U+2121x	𡈐	𡈑	𡈒	𡈓	𡈔	𡈕	𡈖	𡈗	𡈘	𡈙	𡈚	𡈛	𡈜	𡈝	𡈞	𡈟
U+2122x	𡈠	𡈡	𡈢	𡈣	𡈤	𡈥	𡈦	𡈧	𡈨	𡈩	𡈪	𡈫	𡈬	𡈭	𡈮	𡈯
U+2123x	𡈰	𡈱	𡈲	𡈳	𡈴	𡈵	𡈶	𡈷	𡈸	𡈹	𡈺	𡈻	𡈼	𡈽	𡈾	𡈿
U+2124x	𡉀	𡉁	𡉂	𡉃	𡉄	𡉅	𡉆	𡉇	𡉈	𡉉	𡉊	𡉋	𡉌	𡉍	𡉎	𡉏
U+2125x	𡉐	𡉑	𡉒	𡉓	𡉔	𡉕	𡉖	𡉗	𡉘	𡉙	𡉚	𡉛	𡉜	𡉝	𡉞	𡉟
U+2126x	𡉠	𡉡	𡉢	𡉣	𡉤	𡉥	𡉦	𡉧	𡉨	𡉩	𡉪	𡉫	𡉬	𡉭	𡉮	𡉯
U+2127x	𡉰	𡉱	𡉲	𡉳	𡉴	𡉵	𡉶	𡉷	𡉸	𡉹	𡉺	𡉻	𡉼	𡉽	𡉾	𡉿
U+2128x	𡊀	𡊁	𡊂	𡊃	𡊄	𡊅	𡊆	𡊇	𡊈	𡊉	𡊊	𡊋	𡊌	𡊍	𡊎	𡊏
U+2129x	𡊐	𡊑	𡊒	𡊓	𡊔	𡊕	𡊖	𡊗	𡊘	𡊙	𡊚	𡊛	𡊜	𡊝	𡊞	𡊟
U+212Ax	𡊠	𡊡	𡊢	𡊣	𡊤	𡊥	𡊦	𡊧	𡊨	𡊩	𡊪	𡊫	𡊬	𡊭	𡊮	𡊯
U+212Bx	𡊰	𡊱	𡊲	𡊳	𡊴	𡊵	𡊶	𡊷	𡊸	𡊹	𡊺	𡊻	𡊼	𡊽	𡊾	𡊿
U+212Cx	𡋀	𡋁	𡋂	𡋃	𡋄	𡋅	𡋆	𡋇	𡋈	𡋉	𡋊	𡋋	𡋌	𡋍	𡋎	𡋏
U+212Dx	𡋐	𡋑	𡋒	𡋓	𡋔	𡋕	𡋖	𡋗	𡋘	𡋙	𡋚	𡋛	𡋜	𡋝	𡋞	𡋟
U+212Ex	𡋠	𡋡	𡋢	𡋣	𡋤	𡋥	𡋦	𡋧	𡋨	𡋩	𡋪	𡋫	𡋬	𡋭	𡋮	𡋯
U+212Fx	𡋰	𡋱	𡋲	𡋳	𡋴	𡋵	𡋶	𡋷	𡋸	𡋹	𡋺	𡋻	𡋼	𡋽	𡋾	𡋿
U+2130x	𡌀	𡌁	𡌂	𡌃	𡌄	𡌅	𡌆	𡌇	𡌈	𡌉	𡌊	𡌋	𡌌	𡌍	𡌎	𡌏
U+2131x	𡌐	𡌑	𡌒	𡌓	𡌔	𡌕	𡌖	𡌗	𡌘	𡌙	𡌚	𡌛	𡌜	𡌝	𡌞	𡌟
U+2132x	𡌠	𡌡	𡌢	𡌣	𡌤	𡌥	𡌦	𡌧	𡌨	𡌩	𡌪	𡌫	𡌬	𡌭	𡌮	𡌯
U+2133x	𡌰	𡌱	𡌲	𡌳	𡌴	𡌵	𡌶	𡌷	𡌸	𡌹	𡌺	𡌻	𡌼	𡌽	𡌾	𡌿
U+2134x	𡍀	𡍁	𡍂	𡍃	𡍄	𡍅	𡍆	𡍇	𡍈	𡍉	𡍊	𡍋	𡍌	𡍍	𡍎	𡍏
U+2135x	𡍐	𡍑	𡍒	𡍓	𡍔	𡍕	𡍖	𡍗	𡍘	𡍙	𡍚	𡍛	𡍜	𡍝	𡍞	𡍟
U+2136x	𡍠	𡍡	𡍢	𡍣	𡍤	𡍥	𡍦	𡍧	𡍨	𡍩	𡍪	𡍫	𡍬	𡍭	𡍮	𡍯
U+2137x	𡍰	𡍱	𡍲	𡍳	𡍴	𡍵	𡍶	𡍷	𡍸	𡍹	𡍺	𡍻	𡍼	𡍽	𡍾	𡍿
U+2138x	𡎀	𡎁	𡎂	𡎃	𡎄	𡎅	𡎆	𡎇	𡎈	𡎉	𡎊	𡎋	𡎌	𡎍	𡎎	𡎏
U+2139x	𡎐	𡎑	𡎒	𡎓	𡎔	𡎕	𡎖	𡎗	𡎘	𡎙	𡎚	𡎛	𡎜	𡎝	𡎞	𡎟
U+213Ax	𡎠	𡎡	𡎢	𡎣	𡎤	𡎥	𡎦	𡎧	𡎨	𡎩	𡎪	𡎫	𡎬	𡎭	𡎮	𡎯
U+213Bx	𡎰	𡎱	𡎲	𡎳	𡎴	𡎵	𡎶	𡎷	𡎸	𡎹	𡎺	𡎻	𡎼	𡎽	𡎾	𡎿
U+213Cx	𡏀	𡏁	𡏂	𡏃	𡏄	𡏅	𡏆	𡏇	𡏈	𡏉	𡏊	𡏋	𡏌	𡏍	𡏎	𡏏
U+213Dx	𡏐	𡏑	𡏒	𡏓	𡏔	𡏕	𡏖	𡏗	𡏘	𡏙	𡏚	𡏛	𡏜	𡏝	𡏞	𡏟
U+213Ex	𡏠	𡏡	𡏢	𡏣	𡏤	𡏥	𡏦	𡏧	𡏨	𡏩	𡏪	𡏫	𡏬	𡏭	𡏮	𡏯
U+213Fx	𡏰	𡏱	𡏲	𡏳	𡏴	𡏵	𡏶	𡏷	𡏸	𡏹	𡏺	𡏻	𡏼	𡏽	𡏾	𡏿
U+2140x	𡐀	𡐁	𡐂	𡐃	𡐄	𡐅	𡐆	𡐇	𡐈	𡐉	𡐊	𡐋	𡐌	𡐍	𡐎	𡐏
U+2141x	𡐐	𡐑	𡐒	𡐓	𡐔	𡐕	𡐖	𡐗	𡐘	𡐙	𡐚	𡐛	𡐜	𡐝	𡐞	𡐟
U+2142x	𡐠	𡐡	𡐢	𡐣	𡐤	𡐥	𡐦	𡐧	𡐨	𡐩	𡐪	𡐫	𡐬	𡐭	𡐮	𡐯
U+2143x	𡐰	𡐱	𡐲	𡐳	𡐴	𡐵	𡐶	𡐷	𡐸	𡐹	𡐺	𡐻	𡐼	𡐽	𡐾	𡐿
U+2144x	𡑀	𡑁	𡑂	𡑃	𡑄	𡑅	𡑆	𡑇	𡑈	𡑉	𡑊	𡑋	𡑌	𡑍	𡑎	𡑏
U+2145x	𡑐	𡑑	𡑒	𡑓	𡑔	𡑕	𡑖	𡑗	𡑘	𡑙	𡑚	𡑛	𡑜	𡑝	𡑞	𡑟
U+2146x	𡑠	𡑡	𡑢	𡑣	𡑤	𡑥	𡑦	𡑧	𡑨	𡑩	𡑪	𡑫	𡑬	𡑭	𡑮	𡑯
U+2147x	𡑰	𡑱	𡑲	𡑳	𡑴	𡑵	𡑶	𡑷	𡑸	𡑹	𡑺	𡑻	𡑼	𡑽	𡑾	𡑿
U+2148x	𡒀	𡒁	𡒂	𡒃	𡒄	𡒅	𡒆	𡒇	𡒈	𡒉	𡒊	𡒋	𡒌	𡒍	𡒎	𡒏
U+2149x	𡒐	𡒑	𡒒	𡒓	𡒔	𡒕	𡒖	𡒗	𡒘	𡒙	𡒚	𡒛	𡒜	𡒝	𡒞	𡒟
U+214Ax	𡒠	𡒡	𡒢	𡒣	𡒤	𡒥	𡒦	𡒧	𡒨	𡒩	𡒪	𡒫	𡒬	𡒭	𡒮	𡒯
U+214Bx	𡒰	𡒱	𡒲	𡒳	𡒴	𡒵	𡒶	𡒷	𡒸	𡒹	𡒺	𡒻	𡒼	𡒽	𡒾	𡒿
U+214Cx	𡓀	𡓁	𡓂	𡓃	𡓄	𡓅	𡓆	𡓇	𡓈	𡓉	𡓊	𡓋	𡓌	𡓍	𡓎	𡓏
U+214Dx	𡓐	𡓑	𡓒	𡓓	𡓔	𡓕	𡓖	𡓗	𡓘	𡓙	𡓚	𡓛	𡓜	𡓝	𡓞	𡓟
U+214Ex	𡓠	𡓡	𡓢	𡓣	𡓤	𡓥	𡓦	𡓧	𡓨	𡓩	𡓪	𡓫	𡓬	𡓭	𡓮	𡓯
U+214Fx	𡓰	𡓱	𡓲	𡓳	𡓴	𡓵	𡓶	𡓷	𡓸	𡓹	𡓺	𡓻	𡓼	𡓽	𡓾	𡓿
U+2150x	𡔀	𡔁	𡔂	𡔃	𡔄	𡔅	𡔆	𡔇	𡔈	𡔉	𡔊	𡔋	𡔌	𡔍	𡔎	𡔏
U+2151x	𡔐	𡔑	𡔒	𡔓	𡔔	𡔕	𡔖	𡔗	𡔘	𡔙	𡔚	𡔛	𡔜	𡔝	𡔞	𡔟
U+2152x	𡔠	𡔡	𡔢	𡔣	𡔤	𡔥	𡔦	𡔧	𡔨	𡔩	𡔪	𡔫	𡔬	𡔭	𡔮	𡔯
U+2153x	𡔰	𡔱	𡔲	𡔳	𡔴	𡔵	𡔶	𡔷	𡔸	𡔹	𡔺	𡔻	𡔼	𡔽	𡔾	𡔿
U+2154x	𡕀	𡕁	𡕂	𡕃	𡕄	𡕅	𡕆	𡕇	𡕈	𡕉	𡕊	𡕋	𡕌	𡕍	𡕎	𡕏
U+2155x	𡕐	𡕑	𡕒	𡕓	𡕔	𡕕	𡕖	𡕗	𡕘	𡕙	𡕚	𡕛	𡕜	𡕝	𡕞	𡕟
U+2156x	𡕠	𡕡	𡕢	𡕣	𡕤	𡕥	𡕦	𡕧	𡕨	𡕩	𡕪	𡕫	𡕬	𡕭	𡕮	𡕯
U+2157x	𡕰	𡕱	𡕲	𡕳	𡕴	𡕵	𡕶	𡕷	𡕸	𡕹	𡕺	𡕻	𡕼	𡕽	𡕾	𡕿
U+2158x	𡖀	𡖁	𡖂	𡖃	𡖄	𡖅	𡖆	𡖇	𡖈	𡖉	𡖊	𡖋	𡖌	𡖍	𡖎	𡖏
U+2159x	𡖐	𡖑	𡖒	𡖓	𡖔	𡖕	𡖖	𡖗	𡖘	𡖙	𡖚	𡖛	𡖜	𡖝	𡖞	𡖟
U+215Ax	𡖠	𡖡	𡖢	𡖣	𡖤	𡖥	𡖦	𡖧	𡖨	𡖩	𡖪	𡖫	𡖬	𡖭	𡖮	𡖯
U+215Bx	𡖰	𡖱	𡖲	𡖳	𡖴	𡖵	𡖶	𡖷	𡖸	𡖹	𡖺	𡖻	𡖼	𡖽	𡖾	𡖿
U+215Cx	𡗀	𡗁	𡗂	𡗃	𡗄	𡗅	𡗆	𡗇	𡗈	𡗉	𡗊	𡗋	𡗌	𡗍	𡗎	𡗏
U+215Dx	𡗐	𡗑	𡗒	𡗓	𡗔	𡗕	𡗖	𡗗	𡗘	𡗙	𡗚	𡗛	𡗜	𡗝	𡗞	𡗟
U+215Ex	𡗠	𡗡	𡗢	𡗣	𡗤	𡗥	𡗦	𡗧	𡗨	𡗩	𡗪	𡗫	𡗬	𡗭	𡗮	𡗯
U+215Fx	𡗰	𡗱	𡗲	𡗳	𡗴	𡗵	𡗶	𡗷	𡗸	𡗹	𡗺	𡗻	𡗼	𡗽	𡗾	𡗿
U+2160x	𡘀	𡘁	𡘂	𡘃	𡘄	𡘅	𡘆	𡘇	𡘈	𡘉	𡘊	𡘋	𡘌	𡘍	𡘎	𡘏
U+2161x	𡘐	𡘑	𡘒	𡘓	𡘔	𡘕	𡘖	𡘗	𡘘	𡘙	𡘚	𡘛	𡘜	𡘝	𡘞	𡘟
U+2162x	𡘠	𡘡	𡘢	𡘣	𡘤	𡘥	𡘦	𡘧	𡘨	𡘩	𡘪	𡘫	𡘬	𡘭	𡘮	𡘯
U+2163x	𡘰	𡘱	𡘲	𡘳	𡘴	𡘵	𡘶	𡘷	𡘸	𡘹	𡘺	𡘻	𡘼	𡘽	𡘾	𡘿
U+2164x	𡙀	𡙁	𡙂	𡙃	𡙄	𡙅	𡙆	𡙇	𡙈	𡙉	𡙊	𡙋	𡙌	𡙍	𡙎	𡙏
U+2165x	𡙐	𡙑	𡙒	𡙓	𡙔	𡙕	𡙖	𡙗	𡙘	𡙙	𡙚	𡙛	𡙜	𡙝	𡙞	𡙟
U+2166x	𡙠	𡙡	𡙢	𡙣	𡙤	𡙥	𡙦	𡙧	𡙨	𡙩	𡙪	𡙫	𡙬	𡙭	𡙮	𡙯
U+2167x	𡙰	𡙱	𡙲	𡙳	𡙴	𡙵	𡙶	𡙷	𡙸	𡙹	𡙺	𡙻	𡙼	𡙽	𡙾	𡙿
U+2168x	𡚀	𡚁	𡚂	𡚃	𡚄	𡚅	𡚆	𡚇	𡚈	𡚉	𡚊	𡚋	𡚌	𡚍	𡚎	𡚏
U+2169x	𡚐	𡚑	𡚒	𡚓	𡚔	𡚕	𡚖	𡚗	𡚘	𡚙	𡚚	𡚛	𡚜	𡚝	𡚞	𡚟
U+216Ax	𡚠	𡚡	𡚢	𡚣	𡚤	𡚥	𡚦	𡚧	𡚨	𡚩	𡚪	𡚫	𡚬	𡚭	𡚮	𡚯
U+216Bx	𡚰	𡚱	𡚲	𡚳	𡚴	𡚵	𡚶	𡚷	𡚸	𡚹	𡚺	𡚻	𡚼	𡚽	𡚾	𡚿
U+216Cx	𡛀	𡛁	𡛂	𡛃	𡛄	𡛅	𡛆	𡛇	𡛈	𡛉	𡛊	𡛋	𡛌	𡛍	𡛎	𡛏
U+216Dx	𡛐	𡛑	𡛒	𡛓	𡛔	𡛕	𡛖	𡛗	𡛘	𡛙	𡛚	𡛛	𡛜	𡛝	𡛞	𡛟
U+216Ex	𡛠	𡛡	𡛢	𡛣	𡛤	𡛥	𡛦	𡛧	𡛨	𡛩	𡛪	𡛫	𡛬	𡛭	𡛮	𡛯
U+216Fx	𡛰	𡛱	𡛲	𡛳	𡛴	𡛵	𡛶	𡛷	𡛸	𡛹	𡛺	𡛻	𡛼	𡛽	𡛾	𡛿
U+2170x	𡜀	𡜁	𡜂	𡜃	𡜄	𡜅	𡜆	𡜇	𡜈	𡜉	𡜊	𡜋	𡜌	𡜍	𡜎	𡜏
U+2171x	𡜐	𡜑	𡜒	𡜓	𡜔	𡜕	𡜖	𡜗	𡜘	𡜙	𡜚	𡜛	𡜜	𡜝	𡜞	𡜟
U+2172x	𡜠	𡜡	𡜢	𡜣	𡜤	𡜥	𡜦	𡜧	𡜨	𡜩	𡜪	𡜫	𡜬	𡜭	𡜮	𡜯
U+2173x	𡜰	𡜱	𡜲	𡜳	𡜴	𡜵	𡜶	𡜷	𡜸	𡜹	𡜺	𡜻	𡜼	𡜽	𡜾	𡜿
U+2174x	𡝀	𡝁	𡝂	𡝃	𡝄	𡝅	𡝆	𡝇	𡝈	𡝉	𡝊	𡝋	𡝌	𡝍	𡝎	𡝏
U+2175x	𡝐	𡝑	𡝒	𡝓	𡝔	𡝕	𡝖	𡝗	𡝘	𡝙	𡝚	𡝛	𡝜	𡝝	𡝞	𡝟
U+2176x	𡝠	𡝡	𡝢	𡝣	𡝤	𡝥	𡝦	𡝧	𡝨	𡝩	𡝪	𡝫	𡝬	𡝭	𡝮	𡝯
U+2177x	𡝰	𡝱	𡝲	𡝳	𡝴	𡝵	𡝶	𡝷	𡝸	𡝹	𡝺	𡝻	𡝼	𡝽	𡝾	𡝿
U+2178x	𡞀	𡞁	𡞂	𡞃	𡞄	𡞅	𡞆	𡞇	𡞈	𡞉	𡞊	𡞋	𡞌	𡞍	𡞎	𡞏
U+2179x	𡞐	𡞑	𡞒	𡞓	𡞔	𡞕	𡞖	𡞗	𡞘	𡞙	𡞚	𡞛	𡞜	𡞝	𡞞	𡞟
U+217Ax	𡞠	𡞡	𡞢	𡞣	𡞤	𡞥	𡞦	𡞧	𡞨	𡞩	𡞪	𡞫	𡞬	𡞭	𡞮	𡞯
U+217Bx	𡞰	𡞱	𡞲	𡞳	𡞴	𡞵	𡞶	𡞷	𡞸	𡞹	𡞺	𡞻	𡞼	𡞽	𡞾	𡞿
U+217Cx	𡟀	𡟁	𡟂	𡟃	𡟄	𡟅	𡟆	𡟇	𡟈	𡟉	𡟊	𡟋	𡟌	𡟍	𡟎	𡟏
U+217Dx	𡟐	𡟑	𡟒	𡟓	𡟔	𡟕	𡟖	𡟗	𡟘	𡟙	𡟚	𡟛	𡟜	𡟝	𡟞	𡟟
U+217Ex	𡟠	𡟡	𡟢	𡟣	𡟤	𡟥	𡟦	𡟧	𡟨	𡟩	𡟪	𡟫	𡟬	𡟭	𡟮	𡟯
U+217Fx	𡟰	𡟱	𡟲	𡟳	𡟴	𡟵	𡟶	𡟷	𡟸	𡟹	𡟺	𡟻	𡟼	𡟽	𡟾	𡟿
U+2180x	𡠀	𡠁	𡠂	𡠃	𡠄	𡠅	𡠆	𡠇	𡠈	𡠉	𡠊	𡠋	𡠌	𡠍	𡠎	𡠏
U+2181x	𡠐	𡠑	𡠒	𡠓	𡠔	𡠕	𡠖	𡠗	𡠘	𡠙	𡠚	𡠛	𡠜	𡠝	𡠞	𡠟
U+2182x	𡠠	𡠡	𡠢	𡠣	𡠤	𡠥	𡠦	𡠧	𡠨	𡠩	𡠪	𡠫	𡠬	𡠭	𡠮	𡠯
U+2183x	𡠰	𡠱	𡠲	𡠳	𡠴	𡠵	𡠶	𡠷	𡠸	𡠹	𡠺	𡠻	𡠼	𡠽	𡠾	𡠿
U+2184x	𡡀	𡡁	𡡂	𡡃	𡡄	𡡅	𡡆	𡡇	𡡈	𡡉	𡡊	𡡋	𡡌	𡡍	𡡎	𡡏
U+2185x	𡡐	𡡑	𡡒	𡡓	𡡔	𡡕	𡡖	𡡗	𡡘	𡡙	𡡚	𡡛	𡡜	𡡝	𡡞	𡡟
U+2186x	𡡠	𡡡	𡡢	𡡣	𡡤	𡡥	𡡦	𡡧	𡡨	𡡩	𡡪	𡡫	𡡬	𡡭	𡡮	𡡯
U+2187x	𡡰	𡡱	𡡲	𡡳	𡡴	𡡵	𡡶	𡡷	𡡸	𡡹	𡡺	𡡻	𡡼	𡡽	𡡾	𡡿
U+2188x	𡢀	𡢁	𡢂	𡢃	𡢄	𡢅	𡢆	𡢇	𡢈	𡢉	𡢊	𡢋	𡢌	𡢍	𡢎	𡢏
U+2189x	𡢐	𡢑	𡢒	𡢓	𡢔	𡢕	𡢖	𡢗	𡢘	𡢙	𡢚	𡢛	𡢜	𡢝	𡢞	𡢟
U+218Ax	𡢠	𡢡	𡢢	𡢣	𡢤	𡢥	𡢦	𡢧	𡢨	𡢩	𡢪	𡢫	𡢬	𡢭	𡢮	𡢯
U+218Bx	𡢰	𡢱	𡢲	𡢳	𡢴	𡢵	𡢶	𡢷	𡢸	𡢹	𡢺	𡢻	𡢼	𡢽	𡢾	𡢿
U+218Cx	𡣀	𡣁	𡣂	𡣃	𡣄	𡣅	𡣆	𡣇	𡣈	𡣉	𡣊	𡣋	𡣌	𡣍	𡣎	𡣏
U+218Dx	𡣐	𡣑	𡣒	𡣓	𡣔	𡣕	𡣖	𡣗	𡣘	𡣙	𡣚	𡣛	𡣜	𡣝	𡣞	𡣟
U+218Ex	𡣠	𡣡	𡣢	𡣣	𡣤	𡣥	𡣦	𡣧	𡣨	𡣩	𡣪	𡣫	𡣬	𡣭	𡣮	𡣯
U+218Fx	𡣰	𡣱	𡣲	𡣳	𡣴	𡣵	𡣶	𡣷	𡣸	𡣹	𡣺	𡣻	𡣼	𡣽	𡣾	𡣿
U+2190x	𡤀	𡤁	𡤂	𡤃	𡤄	𡤅	𡤆	𡤇	𡤈	𡤉	𡤊	𡤋	𡤌	𡤍	𡤎	𡤏
U+2191x	𡤐	𡤑	𡤒	𡤓	𡤔	𡤕	𡤖	𡤗	𡤘	𡤙	𡤚	𡤛	𡤜	𡤝	𡤞	𡤟
U+2192x	𡤠	𡤡	𡤢	𡤣	𡤤	𡤥	𡤦	𡤧	𡤨	𡤩	𡤪	𡤫	𡤬	𡤭	𡤮	𡤯
U+2193x	𡤰	𡤱	𡤲	𡤳	𡤴	𡤵	𡤶	𡤷	𡤸	𡤹	𡤺	𡤻	𡤼	𡤽	𡤾	𡤿
U+2194x	𡥀	𡥁	𡥂	𡥃	𡥄	𡥅	𡥆	𡥇	𡥈	𡥉	𡥊	𡥋	𡥌	𡥍	𡥎	𡥏
U+2195x	𡥐	𡥑	𡥒	𡥓	𡥔	𡥕	𡥖	𡥗	𡥘	𡥙	𡥚	𡥛	𡥜	𡥝	𡥞	𡥟
U+2196x	𡥠	𡥡	𡥢	𡥣	𡥤	𡥥	𡥦	𡥧	𡥨	𡥩	𡥪	𡥫	𡥬	𡥭	𡥮	𡥯
U+2197x	𡥰	𡥱	𡥲	𡥳	𡥴	𡥵	𡥶	𡥷	𡥸	𡥹	𡥺	𡥻	𡥼	𡥽	𡥾	𡥿
U+2198x	𡦀	𡦁	𡦂	𡦃	𡦄	𡦅	𡦆	𡦇	𡦈	𡦉	𡦊	𡦋	𡦌	𡦍	𡦎	𡦏
U+2199x	𡦐	𡦑	𡦒	𡦓	𡦔	𡦕	𡦖	𡦗	𡦘	𡦙	𡦚	𡦛	𡦜	𡦝	𡦞	𡦟
U+219Ax	𡦠	𡦡	𡦢	𡦣	𡦤	𡦥	𡦦	𡦧	𡦨	𡦩	𡦪	𡦫	𡦬	𡦭	𡦮	𡦯
U+219Bx	𡦰	𡦱	𡦲	𡦳	𡦴	𡦵	𡦶	𡦷	𡦸	𡦹	𡦺	𡦻	𡦼	𡦽	𡦾	𡦿
U+219Cx	𡧀	𡧁	𡧂	𡧃	𡧄	𡧅	𡧆	𡧇	𡧈	𡧉	𡧊	𡧋	𡧌	𡧍	𡧎	𡧏
U+219Dx	𡧐	𡧑	𡧒	𡧓	𡧔	𡧕	𡧖	𡧗	𡧘	𡧙	𡧚	𡧛	𡧜	𡧝	𡧞	𡧟
U+219Ex	𡧠	𡧡	𡧢	𡧣	𡧤	𡧥	𡧦	𡧧	𡧨	𡧩	𡧪	𡧫	𡧬	𡧭	𡧮	𡧯
U+219Fx	𡧰	𡧱	𡧲	𡧳	𡧴	𡧵	𡧶	𡧷	𡧸	𡧹	𡧺	𡧻	𡧼	𡧽	𡧾	𡧿
U+21A0x	𡨀	𡨁	𡨂	𡨃	𡨄	𡨅	𡨆	𡨇	𡨈	𡨉	𡨊	𡨋	𡨌	𡨍	𡨎	𡨏
U+21A1x	𡨐	𡨑	𡨒	𡨓	𡨔	𡨕	𡨖	𡨗	𡨘	𡨙	𡨚	𡨛	𡨜	𡨝	𡨞	𡨟
U+21A2x	𡨠	𡨡	𡨢	𡨣	𡨤	𡨥	𡨦	𡨧	𡨨	𡨩	𡨪	𡨫	𡨬	𡨭	𡨮	𡨯
U+21A3x	𡨰	𡨱	𡨲	𡨳	𡨴	𡨵	𡨶	𡨷	𡨸	𡨹	𡨺	𡨻	𡨼	𡨽	𡨾	𡨿
U+21A4x	𡩀	𡩁	𡩂	𡩃	𡩄	𡩅	𡩆	𡩇	𡩈	𡩉	𡩊	𡩋	𡩌	𡩍	𡩎	𡩏
U+21A5x	𡩐	𡩑	𡩒	𡩓	𡩔	𡩕	𡩖	𡩗	𡩘	𡩙	𡩚	𡩛	𡩜	𡩝	𡩞	𡩟
U+21A6x	𡩠	𡩡	𡩢	𡩣	𡩤	𡩥	𡩦	𡩧	𡩨	𡩩	𡩪	𡩫	𡩬	𡩭	𡩮	𡩯
U+21A7x	𡩰	𡩱	𡩲	𡩳	𡩴	𡩵	𡩶	𡩷	𡩸	𡩹	𡩺	𡩻	𡩼	𡩽	𡩾	𡩿
U+21A8x	𡪀	𡪁	𡪂	𡪃	𡪄	𡪅	𡪆	𡪇	𡪈	𡪉	𡪊	𡪋	𡪌	𡪍	𡪎	𡪏
U+21A9x	𡪐	𡪑	𡪒	𡪓	𡪔	𡪕	𡪖	𡪗	𡪘	𡪙	𡪚	𡪛	𡪜	𡪝	𡪞	𡪟
U+21AAx	𡪠	𡪡	𡪢	𡪣	𡪤	𡪥	𡪦	𡪧	𡪨	𡪩	𡪪	𡪫	𡪬	𡪭	𡪮	𡪯
U+21ABx	𡪰	𡪱	𡪲	𡪳	𡪴	𡪵	𡪶	𡪷	𡪸	𡪹	𡪺	𡪻	𡪼	𡪽	𡪾	𡪿
U+21ACx	𡫀	𡫁	𡫂	𡫃	𡫄	𡫅	𡫆	𡫇	𡫈	𡫉	𡫊	𡫋	𡫌	𡫍	𡫎	𡫏
U+21ADx	𡫐	𡫑	𡫒	𡫓	𡫔	𡫕	𡫖	𡫗	𡫘	𡫙	𡫚	𡫛	𡫜	𡫝	𡫞	𡫟
U+21AEx	𡫠	𡫡	𡫢	𡫣	𡫤	𡫥	𡫦	𡫧	𡫨	𡫩	𡫪	𡫫	𡫬	𡫭	𡫮	𡫯
U+21AFx	𡫰	𡫱	𡫲	𡫳	𡫴	𡫵	𡫶	𡫷	𡫸	𡫹	𡫺	𡫻	𡫼	𡫽	𡫾	𡫿
U+21B0x	𡬀	𡬁	𡬂	𡬃	𡬄	𡬅	𡬆	𡬇	𡬈	𡬉	𡬊	𡬋	𡬌	𡬍	𡬎	𡬏
U+21B1x	𡬐	𡬑	𡬒	𡬓	𡬔	𡬕	𡬖	𡬗	𡬘	𡬙	𡬚	𡬛	𡬜	𡬝	𡬞	𡬟
U+21B2x	𡬠	𡬡	𡬢	𡬣	𡬤	𡬥	𡬦	𡬧	𡬨	𡬩	𡬪	𡬫	𡬬	𡬭	𡬮	𡬯
U+21B3x	𡬰	𡬱	𡬲	𡬳	𡬴	𡬵	𡬶	𡬷	𡬸	𡬹	𡬺	𡬻	𡬼	𡬽	𡬾	𡬿
U+21B4x	𡭀	𡭁	𡭂	𡭃	𡭄	𡭅	𡭆	𡭇	𡭈	𡭉	𡭊	𡭋	𡭌	𡭍	𡭎	𡭏
U+21B5x	𡭐	𡭑	𡭒	𡭓	𡭔	𡭕	𡭖	𡭗	𡭘	𡭙	𡭚	𡭛	𡭜	𡭝	𡭞	𡭟
U+21B6x	𡭠	𡭡	𡭢	𡭣	𡭤	𡭥	𡭦	𡭧	𡭨	𡭩	𡭪	𡭫	𡭬	𡭭	𡭮	𡭯
U+21B7x	𡭰	𡭱	𡭲	𡭳	𡭴	𡭵	𡭶	𡭷	𡭸	𡭹	𡭺	𡭻	𡭼	𡭽	𡭾	𡭿
U+21B8x	𡮀	𡮁	𡮂	𡮃	𡮄	𡮅	𡮆	𡮇	𡮈	𡮉	𡮊	𡮋	𡮌	𡮍	𡮎	𡮏
U+21B9x	𡮐	𡮑	𡮒	𡮓	𡮔	𡮕	𡮖	𡮗	𡮘	𡮙	𡮚	𡮛	𡮜	𡮝	𡮞	𡮟
U+21BAx	𡮠	𡮡	𡮢	𡮣	𡮤	𡮥	𡮦	𡮧	𡮨	𡮩	𡮪	𡮫	𡮬	𡮭	𡮮	𡮯
U+21BBx	𡮰	𡮱	𡮲	𡮳	𡮴	𡮵	𡮶	𡮷	𡮸	𡮹	𡮺	𡮻	𡮼	𡮽	𡮾	𡮿
U+21BCx	𡯀	𡯁	𡯂	𡯃	𡯄	𡯅	𡯆	𡯇	𡯈	𡯉	𡯊	𡯋	𡯌	𡯍	𡯎	𡯏
U+21BDx	𡯐	𡯑	𡯒	𡯓	𡯔	𡯕	𡯖	𡯗	𡯘	𡯙	𡯚	𡯛	𡯜	𡯝	𡯞	𡯟
U+21BEx	𡯠	𡯡	𡯢	𡯣	𡯤	𡯥	𡯦	𡯧	𡯨	𡯩	𡯪	𡯫	𡯬	𡯭	𡯮	𡯯
U+21BFx	𡯰	𡯱	𡯲	𡯳	𡯴	𡯵	𡯶	𡯷	𡯸	𡯹	𡯺	𡯻	𡯼	𡯽	𡯾	𡯿
U+21C0x	𡰀	𡰁	𡰂	𡰃	𡰄	𡰅	𡰆	𡰇	𡰈	𡰉	𡰊	𡰋	𡰌	𡰍	𡰎	𡰏
U+21C1x	𡰐	𡰑	𡰒	𡰓	𡰔	𡰕	𡰖	𡰗	𡰘	𡰙	𡰚	𡰛	𡰜	𡰝	𡰞	𡰟
U+21C2x	𡰠	𡰡	𡰢	𡰣	𡰤	𡰥	𡰦	𡰧	𡰨	𡰩	𡰪	𡰫	𡰬	𡰭	𡰮	𡰯
U+21C3x	𡰰	𡰱	𡰲	𡰳	𡰴	𡰵	𡰶	𡰷	𡰸	𡰹	𡰺	𡰻	𡰼	𡰽	𡰾	𡰿
U+21C4x	𡱀	𡱁	𡱂	𡱃	𡱄	𡱅	𡱆	𡱇	𡱈	𡱉	𡱊	𡱋	𡱌	𡱍	𡱎	𡱏
U+21C5x	𡱐	𡱑	𡱒	𡱓	𡱔	𡱕	𡱖	𡱗	𡱘	𡱙	𡱚	𡱛	𡱜	𡱝	𡱞	𡱟
U+21C6x	𡱠	𡱡	𡱢	𡱣	𡱤	𡱥	𡱦	𡱧	𡱨	𡱩	𡱪	𡱫	𡱬	𡱭	𡱮	𡱯
U+21C7x	𡱰	𡱱	𡱲	𡱳	𡱴	𡱵	𡱶	𡱷	𡱸	𡱹	𡱺	𡱻	𡱼	𡱽	𡱾	𡱿
U+21C8x	𡲀	𡲁	𡲂	𡲃	𡲄	𡲅	𡲆	𡲇	𡲈	𡲉	𡲊	𡲋	𡲌	𡲍	𡲎	𡲏
U+21C9x	𡲐	𡲑	𡲒	𡲓	𡲔	𡲕	𡲖	𡲗	𡲘	𡲙	𡲚	𡲛	𡲜	𡲝	𡲞	𡲟
U+21CAx	𡲠	𡲡	𡲢	𡲣	𡲤	𡲥	𡲦	𡲧	𡲨	𡲩	𡲪	𡲫	𡲬	𡲭	𡲮	𡲯
U+21CBx	𡲰	𡲱	𡲲	𡲳	𡲴	𡲵	𡲶	𡲷	𡲸	𡲹	𡲺	𡲻	𡲼	𡲽	𡲾	𡲿
U+21CCx	𡳀	𡳁	𡳂	𡳃	𡳄	𡳅	𡳆	𡳇	𡳈	𡳉	𡳊	𡳋	𡳌	𡳍	𡳎	𡳏
U+21CDx	𡳐	𡳑	𡳒	𡳓	𡳔	𡳕	𡳖	𡳗	𡳘	𡳙	𡳚	𡳛	𡳜	𡳝	𡳞	𡳟
U+21CEx	𡳠	𡳡	𡳢	𡳣	𡳤	𡳥	𡳦	𡳧	𡳨	𡳩	𡳪	𡳫	𡳬	𡳭	𡳮	𡳯
U+21CFx	𡳰	𡳱	𡳲	𡳳	𡳴	𡳵	𡳶	𡳷	𡳸	𡳹	𡳺	𡳻	𡳼	𡳽	𡳾	𡳿
U+21D0x	𡴀	𡴁	𡴂	𡴃	𡴄	𡴅	𡴆	𡴇	𡴈	𡴉	𡴊	𡴋	𡴌	𡴍	𡴎	𡴏
U+21D1x	𡴐	𡴑	𡴒	𡴓	𡴔	𡴕	𡴖	𡴗	𡴘	𡴙	𡴚	𡴛	𡴜	𡴝	𡴞	𡴟
U+21D2x	𡴠	𡴡	𡴢	𡴣	𡴤	𡴥	𡴦	𡴧	𡴨	𡴩	𡴪	𡴫	𡴬	𡴭	𡴮	𡴯
U+21D3x	𡴰	𡴱	𡴲	𡴳	𡴴	𡴵	𡴶	𡴷	𡴸	𡴹	𡴺	𡴻	𡴼	𡴽	𡴾	𡴿
U+21D4x	𡵀	𡵁	𡵂	𡵃	𡵄	𡵅	𡵆	𡵇	𡵈	𡵉	𡵊	𡵋	𡵌	𡵍	𡵎	𡵏
U+21D5x	𡵐	𡵑	𡵒	𡵓	𡵔	𡵕	𡵖	𡵗	𡵘	𡵙	𡵚	𡵛	𡵜	𡵝	𡵞	𡵟
U+21D6x	𡵠	𡵡	𡵢	𡵣	𡵤	𡵥	𡵦	𡵧	𡵨	𡵩	𡵪	𡵫	𡵬	𡵭	𡵮	𡵯
U+21D7x	𡵰	𡵱	𡵲	𡵳	𡵴	𡵵	𡵶	𡵷	𡵸	𡵹	𡵺	𡵻	𡵼	𡵽	𡵾	𡵿
U+21D8x	𡶀	𡶁	𡶂	𡶃	𡶄	𡶅	𡶆	𡶇	𡶈	𡶉	𡶊	𡶋	𡶌	𡶍	𡶎	𡶏
U+21D9x	𡶐	𡶑	𡶒	𡶓	𡶔	𡶕	𡶖	𡶗	𡶘	𡶙	𡶚	𡶛	𡶜	𡶝	𡶞	𡶟
U+21DAx	𡶠	𡶡	𡶢	𡶣	𡶤	𡶥	𡶦	𡶧	𡶨	𡶩	𡶪	𡶫	𡶬	𡶭	𡶮	𡶯
U+21DBx	𡶰	𡶱	𡶲	𡶳	𡶴	𡶵	𡶶	𡶷	𡶸	𡶹	𡶺	𡶻	𡶼	𡶽	𡶾	𡶿
U+21DCx	𡷀	𡷁	𡷂	𡷃	𡷄	𡷅	𡷆	𡷇	𡷈	𡷉	𡷊	𡷋	𡷌	𡷍	𡷎	𡷏
U+21DDx	𡷐	𡷑	𡷒	𡷓	𡷔	𡷕	𡷖	𡷗	𡷘	𡷙	𡷚	𡷛	𡷜	𡷝	𡷞	𡷟
U+21DEx	𡷠	𡷡	𡷢	𡷣	𡷤	𡷥	𡷦	𡷧	𡷨	𡷩	𡷪	𡷫	𡷬	𡷭	𡷮	𡷯
U+21DFx	𡷰	𡷱	𡷲	𡷳	𡷴	𡷵	𡷶	𡷷	𡷸	𡷹	𡷺	𡷻	𡷼	𡷽	𡷾	𡷿
U+21E0x	𡸀	𡸁	𡸂	𡸃	𡸄	𡸅	𡸆	𡸇	𡸈	𡸉	𡸊	𡸋	𡸌	𡸍	𡸎	𡸏
U+21E1x	𡸐	𡸑	𡸒	𡸓	𡸔	𡸕	𡸖	𡸗	𡸘	𡸙	𡸚	𡸛	𡸜	𡸝	𡸞	𡸟
U+21E2x	𡸠	𡸡	𡸢	𡸣	𡸤	𡸥	𡸦	𡸧	𡸨	𡸩	𡸪	𡸫	𡸬	𡸭	𡸮	𡸯
U+21E3x	𡸰	𡸱	𡸲	𡸳	𡸴	𡸵	𡸶	𡸷	𡸸	𡸹	𡸺	𡸻	𡸼	𡸽	𡸾	𡸿
U+21E4x	𡹀	𡹁	𡹂	𡹃	𡹄	𡹅	𡹆	𡹇	𡹈	𡹉	𡹊	𡹋	𡹌	𡹍	𡹎	𡹏
U+21E5x	𡹐	𡹑	𡹒	𡹓	𡹔	𡹕	𡹖	𡹗	𡹘	𡹙	𡹚	𡹛	𡹜	𡹝	𡹞	𡹟
U+21E6x	𡹠	𡹡	𡹢	𡹣	𡹤	𡹥	𡹦	𡹧	𡹨	𡹩	𡹪	𡹫	𡹬	𡹭	𡹮	𡹯
U+21E7x	𡹰	𡹱	𡹲	𡹳	𡹴	𡹵	𡹶	𡹷	𡹸	𡹹	𡹺	𡹻	𡹼	𡹽	𡹾	𡹿
U+21E8x	𡺀	𡺁	𡺂	𡺃	𡺄	𡺅	𡺆	𡺇	𡺈	𡺉	𡺊	𡺋	𡺌	𡺍	𡺎	𡺏
U+21E9x	𡺐	𡺑	𡺒	𡺓	𡺔	𡺕	𡺖	𡺗	𡺘	𡺙	𡺚	𡺛	𡺜	𡺝	𡺞	𡺟
U+21EAx	𡺠	𡺡	𡺢	𡺣	𡺤	𡺥	𡺦	𡺧	𡺨	𡺩	𡺪	𡺫	𡺬	𡺭	𡺮	𡺯
U+21EBx	𡺰	𡺱	𡺲	𡺳	𡺴	𡺵	𡺶	𡺷	𡺸	𡺹	𡺺	𡺻	𡺼	𡺽	𡺾	𡺿
U+21ECx	𡻀	𡻁	𡻂	𡻃	𡻄	𡻅	𡻆	𡻇	𡻈	𡻉	𡻊	𡻋	𡻌	𡻍	𡻎	𡻏
U+21EDx	𡻐	𡻑	𡻒	𡻓	𡻔	𡻕	𡻖	𡻗	𡻘	𡻙	𡻚	𡻛	𡻜	𡻝	𡻞	𡻟
U+21EEx	𡻠	𡻡	𡻢	𡻣	𡻤	𡻥	𡻦	𡻧	𡻨	𡻩	𡻪	𡻫	𡻬	𡻭	𡻮	𡻯
U+21EFx	𡻰	𡻱	𡻲	𡻳	𡻴	𡻵	𡻶	𡻷	𡻸	𡻹	𡻺	𡻻	𡻼	𡻽	𡻾	𡻿
U+21F0x	𡼀	𡼁	𡼂	𡼃	𡼄	𡼅	𡼆	𡼇	𡼈	𡼉	𡼊	𡼋	𡼌	𡼍	𡼎	𡼏
U+21F1x	𡼐	𡼑	𡼒	𡼓	𡼔	𡼕	𡼖	𡼗	𡼘	𡼙	𡼚	𡼛	𡼜	𡼝	𡼞	𡼟
U+21F2x	𡼠	𡼡	𡼢	𡼣	𡼤	𡼥	𡼦	𡼧	𡼨	𡼩	𡼪	𡼫	𡼬	𡼭	𡼮	𡼯
U+21F3x	𡼰	𡼱	𡼲	𡼳	𡼴	𡼵	𡼶	𡼷	𡼸	𡼹	𡼺	𡼻	𡼼	𡼽	𡼾	𡼿
U+21F4x	𡽀	𡽁	𡽂	𡽃	𡽄	𡽅	𡽆	𡽇	𡽈	𡽉	𡽊	𡽋	𡽌	𡽍	𡽎	𡽏
U+21F5x	𡽐	𡽑	𡽒	𡽓	𡽔	𡽕	𡽖	𡽗	𡽘	𡽙	𡽚	𡽛	𡽜	𡽝	𡽞	𡽟
U+21F6x	𡽠	𡽡	𡽢	𡽣	𡽤	𡽥	𡽦	𡽧	𡽨	𡽩	𡽪	𡽫	𡽬	𡽭	𡽮	𡽯
U+21F7x	𡽰	𡽱	𡽲	𡽳	𡽴	𡽵	𡽶	𡽷	𡽸	𡽹	𡽺	𡽻	𡽼	𡽽	𡽾	𡽿
U+21F8x	𡾀	𡾁	𡾂	𡾃	𡾄	𡾅	𡾆	𡾇	𡾈	𡾉	𡾊	𡾋	𡾌	𡾍	𡾎	𡾏
U+21F9x	𡾐	𡾑	𡾒	𡾓	𡾔	𡾕	𡾖	𡾗	𡾘	𡾙	𡾚	𡾛	𡾜	𡾝	𡾞	𡾟
U+21FAx	𡾠	𡾡	𡾢	𡾣	𡾤	𡾥	𡾦	𡾧	𡾨	𡾩	𡾪	𡾫	𡾬	𡾭	𡾮	𡾯
U+21FBx	𡾰	𡾱	𡾲	𡾳	𡾴	𡾵	𡾶	𡾷	𡾸	𡾹	𡾺	𡾻	𡾼	𡾽	𡾾	𡾿
U+21FCx	𡿀	𡿁	𡿂	𡿃	𡿄	𡿅	𡿆	𡿇	𡿈	𡿉	𡿊	𡿋	𡿌	𡿍	𡿎	𡿏
U+21FDx	𡿐	𡿑	𡿒	𡿓	𡿔	𡿕	𡿖	𡿗	𡿘	𡿙	𡿚	𡿛	𡿜	𡿝	𡿞	𡿟
U+21FEx	𡿠	𡿡	𡿢	𡿣	𡿤	𡿥	𡿦	𡿧	𡿨	𡿩	𡿪	𡿫	𡿬	𡿭	𡿮	𡿯
U+21FFx	𡿰	𡿱	𡿲	𡿳	𡿴	𡿵	𡿶	𡿷	𡿸	𡿹	𡿺	𡿻	𡿼	𡿽	𡿾	𡿿
U+2200x	𢀀	𢀁	𢀂	𢀃	𢀄	𢀅	𢀆	𢀇	𢀈	𢀉	𢀊	𢀋	𢀌	𢀍	𢀎	𢀏
U+2201x	𢀐	𢀑	𢀒	𢀓	𢀔	𢀕	𢀖	𢀗	𢀘	𢀙	𢀚	𢀛	𢀜	𢀝	𢀞	𢀟
U+2202x	𢀠	𢀡	𢀢	𢀣	𢀤	𢀥	𢀦	𢀧	𢀨	𢀩	𢀪	𢀫	𢀬	𢀭	𢀮	𢀯
U+2203x	𢀰	𢀱	𢀲	𢀳	𢀴	𢀵	𢀶	𢀷	𢀸	𢀹	𢀺	𢀻	𢀼	𢀽	𢀾	𢀿
U+2204x	𢁀	𢁁	𢁂	𢁃	𢁄	𢁅	𢁆	𢁇	𢁈	𢁉	𢁊	𢁋	𢁌	𢁍	𢁎	𢁏
U+2205x	𢁐	𢁑	𢁒	𢁓	𢁔	𢁕	𢁖	𢁗	𢁘	𢁙	𢁚	𢁛	𢁜	𢁝	𢁞	𢁟
U+2206x	𢁠	𢁡	𢁢	𢁣	𢁤	𢁥	𢁦	𢁧	𢁨	𢁩	𢁪	𢁫	𢁬	𢁭	𢁮	𢁯
U+2207x	𢁰	𢁱	𢁲	𢁳	𢁴	𢁵	𢁶	𢁷	𢁸	𢁹	𢁺	𢁻	𢁼	𢁽	𢁾	𢁿
U+2208x	𢂀	𢂁	𢂂	𢂃	𢂄	𢂅	𢂆	𢂇	𢂈	𢂉	𢂊	𢂋	𢂌	𢂍	𢂎	𢂏
U+2209x	𢂐	𢂑	𢂒	𢂓	𢂔	𢂕	𢂖	𢂗	𢂘	𢂙	𢂚	𢂛	𢂜	𢂝	𢂞	𢂟
U+220Ax	𢂠	𢂡	𢂢	𢂣	𢂤	𢂥	𢂦	𢂧	𢂨	𢂩	𢂪	𢂫	𢂬	𢂭	𢂮	𢂯
U+220Bx	𢂰	𢂱	𢂲	𢂳	𢂴	𢂵	𢂶	𢂷	𢂸	𢂹	𢂺	𢂻	𢂼	𢂽	𢂾	𢂿
U+220Cx	𢃀	𢃁	𢃂	𢃃	𢃄	𢃅	𢃆	𢃇	𢃈	𢃉	𢃊	𢃋	𢃌	𢃍	𢃎	𢃏
U+220Dx	𢃐	𢃑	𢃒	𢃓	𢃔	𢃕	𢃖	𢃗	𢃘	𢃙	𢃚	𢃛	𢃜	𢃝	𢃞	𢃟
U+220Ex	𢃠	𢃡	𢃢	𢃣	𢃤	𢃥	𢃦	𢃧	𢃨	𢃩	𢃪	𢃫	𢃬	𢃭	𢃮	𢃯
U+220Fx	𢃰	𢃱	𢃲	𢃳	𢃴	𢃵	𢃶	𢃷	𢃸	𢃹	𢃺	𢃻	𢃼	𢃽	𢃾	𢃿
U+2210x	𢄀	𢄁	𢄂	𢄃	𢄄	𢄅	𢄆	𢄇	𢄈	𢄉	𢄊	𢄋	𢄌	𢄍	𢄎	𢄏
U+2211x	𢄐	𢄑	𢄒	𢄓	𢄔	𢄕	𢄖	𢄗	𢄘	𢄙	𢄚	𢄛	𢄜	𢄝	𢄞	𢄟
U+2212x	𢄠	𢄡	𢄢	𢄣	𢄤	𢄥	𢄦	𢄧	𢄨	𢄩	𢄪	𢄫	𢄬	𢄭	𢄮	𢄯
U+2213x	𢄰	𢄱	𢄲	𢄳	𢄴	𢄵	𢄶	𢄷	𢄸	𢄹	𢄺	𢄻	𢄼	𢄽	𢄾	𢄿
U+2214x	𢅀	𢅁	𢅂	𢅃	𢅄	𢅅	𢅆	𢅇	𢅈	𢅉	𢅊	𢅋	𢅌	𢅍	𢅎	𢅏
U+2215x	𢅐	𢅑	𢅒	𢅓	𢅔	𢅕	𢅖	𢅗	𢅘	𢅙	𢅚	𢅛	𢅜	𢅝	𢅞	𢅟
U+2216x	𢅠	𢅡	𢅢	𢅣	𢅤	𢅥	𢅦	𢅧	𢅨	𢅩	𢅪	𢅫	𢅬	𢅭	𢅮	𢅯
U+2217x	𢅰	𢅱	𢅲	𢅳	𢅴	𢅵	𢅶	𢅷	𢅸	𢅹	𢅺	𢅻	𢅼	𢅽	𢅾	𢅿
U+2218x	𢆀	𢆁	𢆂	𢆃	𢆄	𢆅	𢆆	𢆇	𢆈	𢆉	𢆊	𢆋	𢆌	𢆍	𢆎	𢆏
U+2219x	𢆐	𢆑	𢆒	𢆓	𢆔	𢆕	𢆖	𢆗	𢆘	𢆙	𢆚	𢆛	𢆜	𢆝	𢆞	𢆟
U+221Ax	𢆠	𢆡	𢆢	𢆣	𢆤	𢆥	𢆦	𢆧	𢆨	𢆩	𢆪	𢆫	𢆬	𢆭	𢆮	𢆯
U+221Bx	𢆰	𢆱	𢆲	𢆳	𢆴	𢆵	𢆶	𢆷	𢆸	𢆹	𢆺	𢆻	𢆼	𢆽	𢆾	𢆿
U+221Cx	𢇀	𢇁	𢇂	𢇃	𢇄	𢇅	𢇆	𢇇	𢇈	𢇉	𢇊	𢇋	𢇌	𢇍	𢇎	𢇏
U+221Dx	𢇐	𢇑	𢇒	𢇓	𢇔	𢇕	𢇖	𢇗	𢇘	𢇙	𢇚	𢇛	𢇜	𢇝	𢇞	𢇟
U+221Ex	𢇠	𢇡	𢇢	𢇣	𢇤	𢇥	𢇦	𢇧	𢇨	𢇩	𢇪	𢇫	𢇬	𢇭	𢇮	𢇯
U+221Fx	𢇰	𢇱	𢇲	𢇳	𢇴	𢇵	𢇶	𢇷	𢇸	𢇹	𢇺	𢇻	𢇼	𢇽	𢇾	𢇿
U+2220x	𢈀	𢈁	𢈂	𢈃	𢈄	𢈅	𢈆	𢈇	𢈈	𢈉	𢈊	𢈋	𢈌	𢈍	𢈎	𢈏
U+2221x	𢈐	𢈑	𢈒	𢈓	𢈔	𢈕	𢈖	𢈗	𢈘	𢈙	𢈚	𢈛	𢈜	𢈝	𢈞	𢈟
U+2222x	𢈠	𢈡	𢈢	𢈣	𢈤	𢈥	𢈦	𢈧	𢈨	𢈩	𢈪	𢈫	𢈬	𢈭	𢈮	𢈯
U+2223x	𢈰	𢈱	𢈲	𢈳	𢈴	𢈵	𢈶	𢈷	𢈸	𢈹	𢈺	𢈻	𢈼	𢈽	𢈾	𢈿
U+2224x	𢉀	𢉁	𢉂	𢉃	𢉄	𢉅	𢉆	𢉇	𢉈	𢉉	𢉊	𢉋	𢉌	𢉍	𢉎	𢉏
U+2225x	𢉐	𢉑	𢉒	𢉓	𢉔	𢉕	𢉖	𢉗	𢉘	𢉙	𢉚	𢉛	𢉜	𢉝	𢉞	𢉟
U+2226x	𢉠	𢉡	𢉢	𢉣	𢉤	𢉥	𢉦	𢉧	𢉨	𢉩	𢉪	𢉫	𢉬	𢉭	𢉮	𢉯
U+2227x	𢉰	𢉱	𢉲	𢉳	𢉴	𢉵	𢉶	𢉷	𢉸	𢉹	𢉺	𢉻	𢉼	𢉽	𢉾	𢉿
U+2228x	𢊀	𢊁	𢊂	𢊃	𢊄	𢊅	𢊆	𢊇	𢊈	𢊉	𢊊	𢊋	𢊌	𢊍	𢊎	𢊏
U+2229x	𢊐	𢊑	𢊒	𢊓	𢊔	𢊕	𢊖	𢊗	𢊘	𢊙	𢊚	𢊛	𢊜	𢊝	𢊞	𢊟
U+222Ax	𢊠	𢊡	𢊢	𢊣	𢊤	𢊥	𢊦	𢊧	𢊨	𢊩	𢊪	𢊫	𢊬	𢊭	𢊮	𢊯
U+222Bx	𢊰	𢊱	𢊲	𢊳	𢊴	𢊵	𢊶	𢊷	𢊸	𢊹	𢊺	𢊻	𢊼	𢊽	𢊾	𢊿
U+222Cx	𢋀	𢋁	𢋂	𢋃	𢋄	𢋅	𢋆	𢋇	𢋈	𢋉	𢋊	𢋋	𢋌	𢋍	𢋎	𢋏
U+222Dx	𢋐	𢋑	𢋒	𢋓	𢋔	𢋕	𢋖	𢋗	𢋘	𢋙	𢋚	𢋛	𢋜	𢋝	𢋞	𢋟
U+222Ex	𢋠	𢋡	𢋢	𢋣	𢋤	𢋥	𢋦	𢋧	𢋨	𢋩	𢋪	𢋫	𢋬	𢋭	𢋮	𢋯
U+222Fx	𢋰	𢋱	𢋲	𢋳	𢋴	𢋵	𢋶	𢋷	𢋸	𢋹	𢋺	𢋻	𢋼	𢋽	𢋾	𢋿
U+2230x	𢌀	𢌁	𢌂	𢌃	𢌄	𢌅	𢌆	𢌇	𢌈	𢌉	𢌊	𢌋	𢌌	𢌍	𢌎	𢌏
U+2231x	𢌐	𢌑	𢌒	𢌓	𢌔	𢌕	𢌖	𢌗	𢌘	𢌙	𢌚	𢌛	𢌜	𢌝	𢌞	𢌟
U+2232x	𢌠	𢌡	𢌢	𢌣	𢌤	𢌥	𢌦	𢌧	𢌨	𢌩	𢌪	𢌫	𢌬	𢌭	𢌮	𢌯
U+2233x	𢌰	𢌱	𢌲	𢌳	𢌴	𢌵	𢌶	𢌷	𢌸	𢌹	𢌺	𢌻	𢌼	𢌽	𢌾	𢌿
U+2234x	𢍀	𢍁	𢍂	𢍃	𢍄	𢍅	𢍆	𢍇	𢍈	𢍉	𢍊	𢍋	𢍌	𢍍	𢍎	𢍏
U+2235x	𢍐	𢍑	𢍒	𢍓	𢍔	𢍕	𢍖	𢍗	𢍘	𢍙	𢍚	𢍛	𢍜	𢍝	𢍞	𢍟
U+2236x	𢍠	𢍡	𢍢	𢍣	𢍤	𢍥	𢍦	𢍧	𢍨	𢍩	𢍪	𢍫	𢍬	𢍭	𢍮	𢍯
U+2237x	𢍰	𢍱	𢍲	𢍳	𢍴	𢍵	𢍶	𢍷	𢍸	𢍹	𢍺	𢍻	𢍼	𢍽	𢍾	𢍿
U+2238x	𢎀	𢎁	𢎂	𢎃	𢎄	𢎅	𢎆	𢎇	𢎈	𢎉	𢎊	𢎋	𢎌	𢎍	𢎎	𢎏
U+2239x	𢎐	𢎑	𢎒	𢎓	𢎔	𢎕	𢎖	𢎗	𢎘	𢎙	𢎚	𢎛	𢎜	𢎝	𢎞	𢎟
U+223Ax	𢎠	𢎡	𢎢	𢎣	𢎤	𢎥	𢎦	𢎧	𢎨	𢎩	𢎪	𢎫	𢎬	𢎭	𢎮	𢎯
U+223Bx	𢎰	𢎱	𢎲	𢎳	𢎴	𢎵	𢎶	𢎷	𢎸	𢎹	𢎺	𢎻	𢎼	𢎽	𢎾	𢎿
U+223Cx	𢏀	𢏁	𢏂	𢏃	𢏄	𢏅	𢏆	𢏇	𢏈	𢏉	𢏊	𢏋	𢏌	𢏍	𢏎	𢏏
U+223Dx	𢏐	𢏑	𢏒	𢏓	𢏔	𢏕	𢏖	𢏗	𢏘	𢏙	𢏚	𢏛	𢏜	𢏝	𢏞	𢏟
U+223Ex	𢏠	𢏡	𢏢	𢏣	𢏤	𢏥	𢏦	𢏧	𢏨	𢏩	𢏪	𢏫	𢏬	𢏭	𢏮	𢏯
U+223Fx	𢏰	𢏱	𢏲	𢏳	𢏴	𢏵	𢏶	𢏷	𢏸	𢏹	𢏺	𢏻	𢏼	𢏽	𢏾	𢏿
U+2240x	𢐀	𢐁	𢐂	𢐃	𢐄	𢐅	𢐆	𢐇	𢐈	𢐉	𢐊	𢐋	𢐌	𢐍	𢐎	𢐏
U+2241x	𢐐	𢐑	𢐒	𢐓	𢐔	𢐕	𢐖	𢐗	𢐘	𢐙	𢐚	𢐛	𢐜	𢐝	𢐞	𢐟
U+2242x	𢐠	𢐡	𢐢	𢐣	𢐤	𢐥	𢐦	𢐧	𢐨	𢐩	𢐪	𢐫	𢐬	𢐭	𢐮	𢐯
U+2243x	𢐰	𢐱	𢐲	𢐳	𢐴	𢐵	𢐶	𢐷	𢐸	𢐹	𢐺	𢐻	𢐼	𢐽	𢐾	𢐿
U+2244x	𢑀	𢑁	𢑂	𢑃	𢑄	𢑅	𢑆	𢑇	𢑈	𢑉	𢑊	𢑋	𢑌	𢑍	𢑎	𢑏
U+2245x	𢑐	𢑑	𢑒	𢑓	𢑔	𢑕	𢑖	𢑗	𢑘	𢑙	𢑚	𢑛	𢑜	𢑝	𢑞	𢑟
U+2246x	𢑠	𢑡	𢑢	𢑣	𢑤	𢑥	𢑦	𢑧	𢑨	𢑩	𢑪	𢑫	𢑬	𢑭	𢑮	𢑯
U+2247x	𢑰	𢑱	𢑲	𢑳	𢑴	𢑵	𢑶	𢑷	𢑸	𢑹	𢑺	𢑻	𢑼	𢑽	𢑾	𢑿
U+2248x	𢒀	𢒁	𢒂	𢒃	𢒄	𢒅	𢒆	𢒇	𢒈	𢒉	𢒊	𢒋	𢒌	𢒍	𢒎	𢒏
U+2249x	𢒐	𢒑	𢒒	𢒓	𢒔	𢒕	𢒖	𢒗	𢒘	𢒙	𢒚	𢒛	𢒜	𢒝	𢒞	𢒟
U+224Ax	𢒠	𢒡	𢒢	𢒣	𢒤	𢒥	𢒦	𢒧	𢒨	𢒩	𢒪	𢒫	𢒬	𢒭	𢒮	𢒯
U+224Bx	𢒰	𢒱	𢒲	𢒳	𢒴	𢒵	𢒶	𢒷	𢒸	𢒹	𢒺	𢒻	𢒼	𢒽	𢒾	𢒿
U+224Cx	𢓀	𢓁	𢓂	𢓃	𢓄	𢓅	𢓆	𢓇	𢓈	𢓉	𢓊	𢓋	𢓌	𢓍	𢓎	𢓏
U+224Dx	𢓐	𢓑	𢓒	𢓓	𢓔	𢓕	𢓖	𢓗	𢓘	𢓙	𢓚	𢓛	𢓜	𢓝	𢓞	𢓟
U+224Ex	𢓠	𢓡	𢓢	𢓣	𢓤	𢓥	𢓦	𢓧	𢓨	𢓩	𢓪	𢓫	𢓬	𢓭	𢓮	𢓯
U+224Fx	𢓰	𢓱	𢓲	𢓳	𢓴	𢓵	𢓶	𢓷	𢓸	𢓹	𢓺	𢓻	𢓼	𢓽	𢓾	𢓿
U+2250x	𢔀	𢔁	𢔂	𢔃	𢔄	𢔅	𢔆	𢔇	𢔈	𢔉	𢔊	𢔋	𢔌	𢔍	𢔎	𢔏
U+2251x	𢔐	𢔑	𢔒	𢔓	𢔔	𢔕	𢔖	𢔗	𢔘	𢔙	𢔚	𢔛	𢔜	𢔝	𢔞	𢔟
U+2252x	𢔠	𢔡	𢔢	𢔣	𢔤	𢔥	𢔦	𢔧	𢔨	𢔩	𢔪	𢔫	𢔬	𢔭	𢔮	𢔯
U+2253x	𢔰	𢔱	𢔲	𢔳	𢔴	𢔵	𢔶	𢔷	𢔸	𢔹	𢔺	𢔻	𢔼	𢔽	𢔾	𢔿
U+2254x	𢕀	𢕁	𢕂	𢕃	𢕄	𢕅	𢕆	𢕇	𢕈	𢕉	𢕊	𢕋	𢕌	𢕍	𢕎	𢕏
U+2255x	𢕐	𢕑	𢕒	𢕓	𢕔	𢕕	𢕖	𢕗	𢕘	𢕙	𢕚	𢕛	𢕜	𢕝	𢕞	𢕟
U+2256x	𢕠	𢕡	𢕢	𢕣	𢕤	𢕥	𢕦	𢕧	𢕨	𢕩	𢕪	𢕫	𢕬	𢕭	𢕮	𢕯
U+2257x	𢕰	𢕱	𢕲	𢕳	𢕴	𢕵	𢕶	𢕷	𢕸	𢕹	𢕺	𢕻	𢕼	𢕽	𢕾	𢕿
U+2258x	𢖀	𢖁	𢖂	𢖃	𢖄	𢖅	𢖆	𢖇	𢖈	𢖉	𢖊	𢖋	𢖌	𢖍	𢖎	𢖏
U+2259x	𢖐	𢖑	𢖒	𢖓	𢖔	𢖕	𢖖	𢖗	𢖘	𢖙	𢖚	𢖛	𢖜	𢖝	𢖞	𢖟
U+225Ax	𢖠	𢖡	𢖢	𢖣	𢖤	𢖥	𢖦	𢖧	𢖨	𢖩	𢖪	𢖫	𢖬	𢖭	𢖮	𢖯
U+225Bx	𢖰	𢖱	𢖲	𢖳	𢖴	𢖵	𢖶	𢖷	𢖸	𢖹	𢖺	𢖻	𢖼	𢖽	𢖾	𢖿
U+225Cx	𢗀	𢗁	𢗂	𢗃	𢗄	𢗅	𢗆	𢗇	𢗈	𢗉	𢗊	𢗋	𢗌	𢗍	𢗎	𢗏
U+225Dx	𢗐	𢗑	𢗒	𢗓	𢗔	𢗕	𢗖	𢗗	𢗘	𢗙	𢗚	𢗛	𢗜	𢗝	𢗞	𢗟
U+225Ex	𢗠	𢗡	𢗢	𢗣	𢗤	𢗥	𢗦	𢗧	𢗨	𢗩	𢗪	𢗫	𢗬	𢗭	𢗮	𢗯
U+225Fx	𢗰	𢗱	𢗲	𢗳	𢗴	𢗵	𢗶	𢗷	𢗸	𢗹	𢗺	𢗻	𢗼	𢗽	𢗾	𢗿
U+2260x	𢘀	𢘁	𢘂	𢘃	𢘄	𢘅	𢘆	𢘇	𢘈	𢘉	𢘊	𢘋	𢘌	𢘍	𢘎	𢘏
U+2261x	𢘐	𢘑	𢘒	𢘓	𢘔	𢘕	𢘖	𢘗	𢘘	𢘙	𢘚	𢘛	𢘜	𢘝	𢘞	𢘟
U+2262x	𢘠	𢘡	𢘢	𢘣	𢘤	𢘥	𢘦	𢘧	𢘨	𢘩	𢘪	𢘫	𢘬	𢘭	𢘮	𢘯
U+2263x	𢘰	𢘱	𢘲	𢘳	𢘴	𢘵	𢘶	𢘷	𢘸	𢘹	𢘺	𢘻	𢘼	𢘽	𢘾	𢘿
U+2264x	𢙀	𢙁	𢙂	𢙃	𢙄	𢙅	𢙆	𢙇	𢙈	𢙉	𢙊	𢙋	𢙌	𢙍	𢙎	𢙏
U+2265x	𢙐	𢙑	𢙒	𢙓	𢙔	𢙕	𢙖	𢙗	𢙘	𢙙	𢙚	𢙛	𢙜	𢙝	𢙞	𢙟
U+2266x	𢙠	𢙡	𢙢	𢙣	𢙤	𢙥	𢙦	𢙧	𢙨	𢙩	𢙪	𢙫	𢙬	𢙭	𢙮	𢙯
U+2267x	𢙰	𢙱	𢙲	𢙳	𢙴	𢙵	𢙶	𢙷	𢙸	𢙹	𢙺	𢙻	𢙼	𢙽	𢙾	𢙿
U+2268x	𢚀	𢚁	𢚂	𢚃	𢚄	𢚅	𢚆	𢚇	𢚈	𢚉	𢚊	𢚋	𢚌	𢚍	𢚎	𢚏
U+2269x	𢚐	𢚑	𢚒	𢚓	𢚔	𢚕	𢚖	𢚗	𢚘	𢚙	𢚚	𢚛	𢚜	𢚝	𢚞	𢚟
U+226Ax	𢚠	𢚡	𢚢	𢚣	𢚤	𢚥	𢚦	𢚧	𢚨	𢚩	𢚪	𢚫	𢚬	𢚭	𢚮	𢚯
U+226Bx	𢚰	𢚱	𢚲	𢚳	𢚴	𢚵	𢚶	𢚷	𢚸	𢚹	𢚺	𢚻	𢚼	𢚽	𢚾	𢚿
U+226Cx	𢛀	𢛁	𢛂	𢛃	𢛄	𢛅	𢛆	𢛇	𢛈	𢛉	𢛊	𢛋	𢛌	𢛍	𢛎	𢛏
U+226Dx	𢛐	𢛑	𢛒	𢛓	𢛔	𢛕	𢛖	𢛗	𢛘	𢛙	𢛚	𢛛	𢛜	𢛝	𢛞	𢛟
U+226Ex	𢛠	𢛡	𢛢	𢛣	𢛤	𢛥	𢛦	𢛧	𢛨	𢛩	𢛪	𢛫	𢛬	𢛭	𢛮	𢛯
U+226Fx	𢛰	𢛱	𢛲	𢛳	𢛴	𢛵	𢛶	𢛷	𢛸	𢛹	𢛺	𢛻	𢛼	𢛽	𢛾	𢛿
U+2270x	𢜀	𢜁	𢜂	𢜃	𢜄	𢜅	𢜆	𢜇	𢜈	𢜉	𢜊	𢜋	𢜌	𢜍	𢜎	𢜏
U+2271x	𢜐	𢜑	𢜒	𢜓	𢜔	𢜕	𢜖	𢜗	𢜘	𢜙	𢜚	𢜛	𢜜	𢜝	𢜞	𢜟
U+2272x	𢜠	𢜡	𢜢	𢜣	𢜤	𢜥	𢜦	𢜧	𢜨	𢜩	𢜪	𢜫	𢜬	𢜭	𢜮	𢜯
U+2273x	𢜰	𢜱	𢜲	𢜳	𢜴	𢜵	𢜶	𢜷	𢜸	𢜹	𢜺	𢜻	𢜼	𢜽	𢜾	𢜿
U+2274x	𢝀	𢝁	𢝂	𢝃	𢝄	𢝅	𢝆	𢝇	𢝈	𢝉	𢝊	𢝋	𢝌	𢝍	𢝎	𢝏
U+2275x	𢝐	𢝑	𢝒	𢝓	𢝔	𢝕	𢝖	𢝗	𢝘	𢝙	𢝚	𢝛	𢝜	𢝝	𢝞	𢝟
U+2276x	𢝠	𢝡	𢝢	𢝣	𢝤	𢝥	𢝦	𢝧	𢝨	𢝩	𢝪	𢝫	𢝬	𢝭	𢝮	𢝯
U+2277x	𢝰	𢝱	𢝲	𢝳	𢝴	𢝵	𢝶	𢝷	𢝸	𢝹	𢝺	𢝻	𢝼	𢝽	𢝾	𢝿
U+2278x	𢞀	𢞁	𢞂	𢞃	𢞄	𢞅	𢞆	𢞇	𢞈	𢞉	𢞊	𢞋	𢞌	𢞍	𢞎	𢞏
U+2279x	𢞐	𢞑	𢞒	𢞓	𢞔	𢞕	𢞖	𢞗	𢞘	𢞙	𢞚	𢞛	𢞜	𢞝	𢞞	𢞟
U+227Ax	𢞠	𢞡	𢞢	𢞣	𢞤	𢞥	𢞦	𢞧	𢞨	𢞩	𢞪	𢞫	𢞬	𢞭	𢞮	𢞯
U+227Bx	𢞰	𢞱	𢞲	𢞳	𢞴	𢞵	𢞶	𢞷	𢞸	𢞹	𢞺	𢞻	𢞼	𢞽	𢞾	𢞿
U+227Cx	𢟀	𢟁	𢟂	𢟃	𢟄	𢟅	𢟆	𢟇	𢟈	𢟉	𢟊	𢟋	𢟌	𢟍	𢟎	𢟏
U+227Dx	𢟐	𢟑	𢟒	𢟓	𢟔	𢟕	𢟖	𢟗	𢟘	𢟙	𢟚	𢟛	𢟜	𢟝	𢟞	𢟟
U+227Ex	𢟠	𢟡	𢟢	𢟣	𢟤	𢟥	𢟦	𢟧	𢟨	𢟩	𢟪	𢟫	𢟬	𢟭	𢟮	𢟯
U+227Fx	𢟰	𢟱	𢟲	𢟳	𢟴	𢟵	𢟶	𢟷	𢟸	𢟹	𢟺	𢟻	𢟼	𢟽	𢟾	𢟿
U+2280x	𢠀	𢠁	𢠂	𢠃	𢠄	𢠅	𢠆	𢠇	𢠈	𢠉	𢠊	𢠋	𢠌	𢠍	𢠎	𢠏
U+2281x	𢠐	𢠑	𢠒	𢠓	𢠔	𢠕	𢠖	𢠗	𢠘	𢠙	𢠚	𢠛	𢠜	𢠝	𢠞	𢠟
U+2282x	𢠠	𢠡	𢠢	𢠣	𢠤	𢠥	𢠦	𢠧	𢠨	𢠩	𢠪	𢠫	𢠬	𢠭	𢠮	𢠯
U+2283x	𢠰	𢠱	𢠲	𢠳	𢠴	𢠵	𢠶	𢠷	𢠸	𢠹	𢠺	𢠻	𢠼	𢠽	𢠾	𢠿
U+2284x	𢡀	𢡁	𢡂	𢡃	𢡄	𢡅	𢡆	𢡇	𢡈	𢡉	𢡊	𢡋	𢡌	𢡍	𢡎	𢡏
U+2285x	𢡐	𢡑	𢡒	𢡓	𢡔	𢡕	𢡖	𢡗	𢡘	𢡙	𢡚	𢡛	𢡜	𢡝	𢡞	𢡟
U+2286x	𢡠	𢡡	𢡢	𢡣	𢡤	𢡥	𢡦	𢡧	𢡨	𢡩	𢡪	𢡫	𢡬	𢡭	𢡮	𢡯
U+2287x	𢡰	𢡱	𢡲	𢡳	𢡴	𢡵	𢡶	𢡷	𢡸	𢡹	𢡺	𢡻	𢡼	𢡽	𢡾	𢡿
U+2288x	𢢀	𢢁	𢢂	𢢃	𢢄	𢢅	𢢆	𢢇	𢢈	𢢉	𢢊	𢢋	𢢌	𢢍	𢢎	𢢏
U+2289x	𢢐	𢢑	𢢒	𢢓	𢢔	𢢕	𢢖	𢢗	𢢘	𢢙	𢢚	𢢛	𢢜	𢢝	𢢞	𢢟
U+228Ax	𢢠	𢢡	𢢢	𢢣	𢢤	𢢥	𢢦	𢢧	𢢨	𢢩	𢢪	𢢫	𢢬	𢢭	𢢮	𢢯
U+228Bx	𢢰	𢢱	𢢲	𢢳	𢢴	𢢵	𢢶	𢢷	𢢸	𢢹	𢢺	𢢻	𢢼	𢢽	𢢾	𢢿
U+228Cx	𢣀	𢣁	𢣂	𢣃	𢣄	𢣅	𢣆	𢣇	𢣈	𢣉	𢣊	𢣋	𢣌	𢣍	𢣎	𢣏
U+228Dx	𢣐	𢣑	𢣒	𢣓	𢣔	𢣕	𢣖	𢣗	𢣘	𢣙	𢣚	𢣛	𢣜	𢣝	𢣞	𢣟
U+228Ex	𢣠	𢣡	𢣢	𢣣	𢣤	𢣥	𢣦	𢣧	𢣨	𢣩	𢣪	𢣫	𢣬	𢣭	𢣮	𢣯
U+228Fx	𢣰	𢣱	𢣲	𢣳	𢣴	𢣵	𢣶	𢣷	𢣸	𢣹	𢣺	𢣻	𢣼	𢣽	𢣾	𢣿
U+2290x	𢤀	𢤁	𢤂	𢤃	𢤄	𢤅	𢤆	𢤇	𢤈	𢤉	𢤊	𢤋	𢤌	𢤍	𢤎	𢤏
U+2291x	𢤐	𢤑	𢤒	𢤓	𢤔	𢤕	𢤖	𢤗	𢤘	𢤙	𢤚	𢤛	𢤜	𢤝	𢤞	𢤟
U+2292x	𢤠	𢤡	𢤢	𢤣	𢤤	𢤥	𢤦	𢤧	𢤨	𢤩	𢤪	𢤫	𢤬	𢤭	𢤮	𢤯
U+2293x	𢤰	𢤱	𢤲	𢤳	𢤴	𢤵	𢤶	𢤷	𢤸	𢤹	𢤺	𢤻	𢤼	𢤽	𢤾	𢤿
U+2294x	𢥀	𢥁	𢥂	𢥃	𢥄	𢥅	𢥆	𢥇	𢥈	𢥉	𢥊	𢥋	𢥌	𢥍	𢥎	𢥏
U+2295x	𢥐	𢥑	𢥒	𢥓	𢥔	𢥕	𢥖	𢥗	𢥘	𢥙	𢥚	𢥛	𢥜	𢥝	𢥞	𢥟
U+2296x	𢥠	𢥡	𢥢	𢥣	𢥤	𢥥	𢥦	𢥧	𢥨	𢥩	𢥪	𢥫	𢥬	𢥭	𢥮	𢥯
U+2297x	𢥰	𢥱	𢥲	𢥳	𢥴	𢥵	𢥶	𢥷	𢥸	𢥹	𢥺	𢥻	𢥼	𢥽	𢥾	𢥿
U+2298x	𢦀	𢦁	𢦂	𢦃	𢦄	𢦅	𢦆	𢦇	𢦈	𢦉	𢦊	𢦋	𢦌	𢦍	𢦎	𢦏
U+2299x	𢦐	𢦑	𢦒	𢦓	𢦔	𢦕	𢦖	𢦗	𢦘	𢦙	𢦚	𢦛	𢦜	𢦝	𢦞	𢦟
U+229Ax	𢦠	𢦡	𢦢	𢦣	𢦤	𢦥	𢦦	𢦧	𢦨	𢦩	𢦪	𢦫	𢦬	𢦭	𢦮	𢦯
U+229Bx	𢦰	𢦱	𢦲	𢦳	𢦴	𢦵	𢦶	𢦷	𢦸	𢦹	𢦺	𢦻	𢦼	𢦽	𢦾	𢦿
U+229Cx	𢧀	𢧁	𢧂	𢧃	𢧄	𢧅	𢧆	𢧇	𢧈	𢧉	𢧊	𢧋	𢧌	𢧍	𢧎	𢧏
U+229Dx	𢧐	𢧑	𢧒	𢧓	𢧔	𢧕	𢧖	𢧗	𢧘	𢧙	𢧚	𢧛	𢧜	𢧝	𢧞	𢧟
U+229Ex	𢧠	𢧡	𢧢	𢧣	𢧤	𢧥	𢧦	𢧧	𢧨	𢧩	𢧪	𢧫	𢧬	𢧭	𢧮	𢧯
U+229Fx	𢧰	𢧱	𢧲	𢧳	𢧴	𢧵	𢧶	𢧷	𢧸	𢧹	𢧺	𢧻	𢧼	𢧽	𢧾	𢧿
U+22A0x	𢨀	𢨁	𢨂	𢨃	𢨄	𢨅	𢨆	𢨇	𢨈	𢨉	𢨊	𢨋	𢨌	𢨍	𢨎	𢨏
U+22A1x	𢨐	𢨑	𢨒	𢨓	𢨔	𢨕	𢨖	𢨗	𢨘	𢨙	𢨚	𢨛	𢨜	𢨝	𢨞	𢨟
U+22A2x	𢨠	𢨡	𢨢	𢨣	𢨤	𢨥	𢨦	𢨧	𢨨	𢨩	𢨪	𢨫	𢨬	𢨭	𢨮	𢨯
U+22A3x	𢨰	𢨱	𢨲	𢨳	𢨴	𢨵	𢨶	𢨷	𢨸	𢨹	𢨺	𢨻	𢨼	𢨽	𢨾	𢨿
U+22A4x	𢩀	𢩁	𢩂	𢩃	𢩄	𢩅	𢩆	𢩇	𢩈	𢩉	𢩊	𢩋	𢩌	𢩍	𢩎	𢩏
U+22A5x	𢩐	𢩑	𢩒	𢩓	𢩔	𢩕	𢩖	𢩗	𢩘	𢩙	𢩚	𢩛	𢩜	𢩝	𢩞	𢩟
U+22A6x	𢩠	𢩡	𢩢	𢩣	𢩤	𢩥	𢩦	𢩧	𢩨	𢩩	𢩪	𢩫	𢩬	𢩭	𢩮	𢩯
U+22A7x	𢩰	𢩱	𢩲	𢩳	𢩴	𢩵	𢩶	𢩷	𢩸	𢩹	𢩺	𢩻	𢩼	𢩽	𢩾	𢩿
U+22A8x	𢪀	𢪁	𢪂	𢪃	𢪄	𢪅	𢪆	𢪇	𢪈	𢪉	𢪊	𢪋	𢪌	𢪍	𢪎	𢪏
U+22A9x	𢪐	𢪑	𢪒	𢪓	𢪔	𢪕	𢪖	𢪗	𢪘	𢪙	𢪚	𢪛	𢪜	𢪝	𢪞	𢪟
U+22AAx	𢪠	𢪡	𢪢	𢪣	𢪤	𢪥	𢪦	𢪧	𢪨	𢪩	𢪪	𢪫	𢪬	𢪭	𢪮	𢪯
U+22ABx	𢪰	𢪱	𢪲	𢪳	𢪴	𢪵	𢪶	𢪷	𢪸	𢪹	𢪺	𢪻	𢪼	𢪽	𢪾	𢪿
U+22ACx	𢫀	𢫁	𢫂	𢫃	𢫄	𢫅	𢫆	𢫇	𢫈	𢫉	𢫊	𢫋	𢫌	𢫍	𢫎	𢫏
U+22ADx	𢫐	𢫑	𢫒	𢫓	𢫔	𢫕	𢫖	𢫗	𢫘	𢫙	𢫚	𢫛	𢫜	𢫝	𢫞	𢫟
U+22AEx	𢫠	𢫡	𢫢	𢫣	𢫤	𢫥	𢫦	𢫧	𢫨	𢫩	𢫪	𢫫	𢫬	𢫭	𢫮	𢫯
U+22AFx	𢫰	𢫱	𢫲	𢫳	𢫴	𢫵	𢫶	𢫷	𢫸	𢫹	𢫺	𢫻	𢫼	𢫽	𢫾	𢫿
U+22B0x	𢬀	𢬁	𢬂	𢬃	𢬄	𢬅	𢬆	𢬇	𢬈	𢬉	𢬊	𢬋	𢬌	𢬍	𢬎	𢬏
U+22B1x	𢬐	𢬑	𢬒	𢬓	𢬔	𢬕	𢬖	𢬗	𢬘	𢬙	𢬚	𢬛	𢬜	𢬝	𢬞	𢬟
U+22B2x	𢬠	𢬡	𢬢	𢬣	𢬤	𢬥	𢬦	𢬧	𢬨	𢬩	𢬪	𢬫	𢬬	𢬭	𢬮	𢬯
U+22B3x	𢬰	𢬱	𢬲	𢬳	𢬴	𢬵	𢬶	𢬷	𢬸	𢬹	𢬺	𢬻	𢬼	𢬽	𢬾	𢬿
U+22B4x	𢭀	𢭁	𢭂	𢭃	𢭄	𢭅	𢭆	𢭇	𢭈	𢭉	𢭊	𢭋	𢭌	𢭍	𢭎	𢭏
U+22B5x	𢭐	𢭑	𢭒	𢭓	𢭔	𢭕	𢭖	𢭗	𢭘	𢭙	𢭚	𢭛	𢭜	𢭝	𢭞	𢭟
U+22B6x	𢭠	𢭡	𢭢	𢭣	𢭤	𢭥	𢭦	𢭧	𢭨	𢭩	𢭪	𢭫	𢭬	𢭭	𢭮	𢭯
U+22B7x	𢭰	𢭱	𢭲	𢭳	𢭴	𢭵	𢭶	𢭷	𢭸	𢭹	𢭺	𢭻	𢭼	𢭽	𢭾	𢭿
U+22B8x	𢮀	𢮁	𢮂	𢮃	𢮄	𢮅	𢮆	𢮇	𢮈	𢮉	𢮊	𢮋	𢮌	𢮍	𢮎	𢮏
U+22B9x	𢮐	𢮑	𢮒	𢮓	𢮔	𢮕	𢮖	𢮗	𢮘	𢮙	𢮚	𢮛	𢮜	𢮝	𢮞	𢮟
U+22BAx	𢮠	𢮡	𢮢	𢮣	𢮤	𢮥	𢮦	𢮧	𢮨	𢮩	𢮪	𢮫	𢮬	𢮭	𢮮	𢮯
U+22BBx	𢮰	𢮱	𢮲	𢮳	𢮴	𢮵	𢮶	𢮷	𢮸	𢮹	𢮺	𢮻	𢮼	𢮽	𢮾	𢮿
U+22BCx	𢯀	𢯁	𢯂	𢯃	𢯄	𢯅	𢯆	𢯇	𢯈	𢯉	𢯊	𢯋	𢯌	𢯍	𢯎	𢯏
U+22BDx	𢯐	𢯑	𢯒	𢯓	𢯔	𢯕	𢯖	𢯗	𢯘	𢯙	𢯚	𢯛	𢯜	𢯝	𢯞	𢯟
U+22BEx	𢯠	𢯡	𢯢	𢯣	𢯤	𢯥	𢯦	𢯧	𢯨	𢯩	𢯪	𢯫	𢯬	𢯭	𢯮	𢯯
U+22BFx	𢯰	𢯱	𢯲	𢯳	𢯴	𢯵	𢯶	𢯷	𢯸	𢯹	𢯺	𢯻	𢯼	𢯽	𢯾	𢯿
U+22C0x	𢰀	𢰁	𢰂	𢰃	𢰄	𢰅	𢰆	𢰇	𢰈	𢰉	𢰊	𢰋	𢰌	𢰍	𢰎	𢰏
U+22C1x	𢰐	𢰑	𢰒	𢰓	𢰔	𢰕	𢰖	𢰗	𢰘	𢰙	𢰚	𢰛	𢰜	𢰝	𢰞	𢰟
U+22C2x	𢰠	𢰡	𢰢	𢰣	𢰤	𢰥	𢰦	𢰧	𢰨	𢰩	𢰪	𢰫	𢰬	𢰭	𢰮	𢰯
U+22C3x	𢰰	𢰱	𢰲	𢰳	𢰴	𢰵	𢰶	𢰷	𢰸	𢰹	𢰺	𢰻	𢰼	𢰽	𢰾	𢰿
U+22C4x	𢱀	𢱁	𢱂	𢱃	𢱄	𢱅	𢱆	𢱇	𢱈	𢱉	𢱊	𢱋	𢱌	𢱍	𢱎	𢱏
U+22C5x	𢱐	𢱑	𢱒	𢱓	𢱔	𢱕	𢱖	𢱗	𢱘	𢱙	𢱚	𢱛	𢱜	𢱝	𢱞	𢱟
U+22C6x	𢱠	𢱡	𢱢	𢱣	𢱤	𢱥	𢱦	𢱧	𢱨	𢱩	𢱪	𢱫	𢱬	𢱭	𢱮	𢱯
U+22C7x	𢱰	𢱱	𢱲	𢱳	𢱴	𢱵	𢱶	𢱷	𢱸	𢱹	𢱺	𢱻	𢱼	𢱽	𢱾	𢱿
U+22C8x	𢲀	𢲁	𢲂	𢲃	𢲄	𢲅	𢲆	𢲇	𢲈	𢲉	𢲊	𢲋	𢲌	𢲍	𢲎	𢲏
U+22C9x	𢲐	𢲑	𢲒	𢲓	𢲔	𢲕	𢲖	𢲗	𢲘	𢲙	𢲚	𢲛	𢲜	𢲝	𢲞	𢲟
U+22CAx	𢲠	𢲡	𢲢	𢲣	𢲤	𢲥	𢲦	𢲧	𢲨	𢲩	𢲪	𢲫	𢲬	𢲭	𢲮	𢲯
U+22CBx	𢲰	𢲱	𢲲	𢲳	𢲴	𢲵	𢲶	𢲷	𢲸	𢲹	𢲺	𢲻	𢲼	𢲽	𢲾	𢲿
U+22CCx	𢳀	𢳁	𢳂	𢳃	𢳄	𢳅	𢳆	𢳇	𢳈	𢳉	𢳊	𢳋	𢳌	𢳍	𢳎	𢳏
U+22CDx	𢳐	𢳑	𢳒	𢳓	𢳔	𢳕	𢳖	𢳗	𢳘	𢳙	𢳚	𢳛	𢳜	𢳝	𢳞	𢳟
U+22CEx	𢳠	𢳡	𢳢	𢳣	𢳤	𢳥	𢳦	𢳧	𢳨	𢳩	𢳪	𢳫	𢳬	𢳭	𢳮	𢳯
U+22CFx	𢳰	𢳱	𢳲	𢳳	𢳴	𢳵	𢳶	𢳷	𢳸	𢳹	𢳺	𢳻	𢳼	𢳽	𢳾	𢳿
U+22D0x	𢴀	𢴁	𢴂	𢴃	𢴄	𢴅	𢴆	𢴇	𢴈	𢴉	𢴊	𢴋	𢴌	𢴍	𢴎	𢴏
U+22D1x	𢴐	𢴑	𢴒	𢴓	𢴔	𢴕	𢴖	𢴗	𢴘	𢴙	𢴚	𢴛	𢴜	𢴝	𢴞	𢴟
U+22D2x	𢴠	𢴡	𢴢	𢴣	𢴤	𢴥	𢴦	𢴧	𢴨	𢴩	𢴪	𢴫	𢴬	𢴭	𢴮	𢴯
U+22D3x	𢴰	𢴱	𢴲	𢴳	𢴴	𢴵	𢴶	𢴷	𢴸	𢴹	𢴺	𢴻	𢴼	𢴽	𢴾	𢴿
U+22D4x	𢵀	𢵁	𢵂	𢵃	𢵄	𢵅	𢵆	𢵇	𢵈	𢵉	𢵊	𢵋	𢵌	𢵍	𢵎	𢵏
U+22D5x	𢵐	𢵑	𢵒	𢵓	𢵔	𢵕	𢵖	𢵗	𢵘	𢵙	𢵚	𢵛	𢵜	𢵝	𢵞	𢵟
U+22D6x	𢵠	𢵡	𢵢	𢵣	𢵤	𢵥	𢵦	𢵧	𢵨	𢵩	𢵪	𢵫	𢵬	𢵭	𢵮	𢵯
U+22D7x	𢵰	𢵱	𢵲	𢵳	𢵴	𢵵	𢵶	𢵷	𢵸	𢵹	𢵺	𢵻	𢵼	𢵽	𢵾	𢵿
U+22D8x	𢶀	𢶁	𢶂	𢶃	𢶄	𢶅	𢶆	𢶇	𢶈	𢶉	𢶊	𢶋	𢶌	𢶍	𢶎	𢶏
U+22D9x	𢶐	𢶑	𢶒	𢶓	𢶔	𢶕	𢶖	𢶗	𢶘	𢶙	𢶚	𢶛	𢶜	𢶝	𢶞	𢶟
U+22DAx	𢶠	𢶡	𢶢	𢶣	𢶤	𢶥	𢶦	𢶧	𢶨	𢶩	𢶪	𢶫	𢶬	𢶭	𢶮	𢶯
U+22DBx	𢶰	𢶱	𢶲	𢶳	𢶴	𢶵	𢶶	𢶷	𢶸	𢶹	𢶺	𢶻	𢶼	𢶽	𢶾	𢶿
U+22DCx	𢷀	𢷁	𢷂	𢷃	𢷄	𢷅	𢷆	𢷇	𢷈	𢷉	𢷊	𢷋	𢷌	𢷍	𢷎	𢷏
U+22DDx	𢷐	𢷑	𢷒	𢷓	𢷔	𢷕	𢷖	𢷗	𢷘	𢷙	𢷚	𢷛	𢷜	𢷝	𢷞	𢷟
U+22DEx	𢷠	𢷡	𢷢	𢷣	𢷤	𢷥	𢷦	𢷧	𢷨	𢷩	𢷪	𢷫	𢷬	𢷭	𢷮	𢷯
U+22DFx	𢷰	𢷱	𢷲	𢷳	𢷴	𢷵	𢷶	𢷷	𢷸	𢷹	𢷺	𢷻	𢷼	𢷽	𢷾	𢷿
U+22E0x	𢸀	𢸁	𢸂	𢸃	𢸄	𢸅	𢸆	𢸇	𢸈	𢸉	𢸊	𢸋	𢸌	𢸍	𢸎	𢸏
U+22E1x	𢸐	𢸑	𢸒	𢸓	𢸔	𢸕	𢸖	𢸗	𢸘	𢸙	𢸚	𢸛	𢸜	𢸝	𢸞	𢸟
U+22E2x	𢸠	𢸡	𢸢	𢸣	𢸤	𢸥	𢸦	𢸧	𢸨	𢸩	𢸪	𢸫	𢸬	𢸭	𢸮	𢸯
U+22E3x	𢸰	𢸱	𢸲	𢸳	𢸴	𢸵	𢸶	𢸷	𢸸	𢸹	𢸺	𢸻	𢸼	𢸽	𢸾	𢸿
U+22E4x	𢹀	𢹁	𢹂	𢹃	𢹄	𢹅	𢹆	𢹇	𢹈	𢹉	𢹊	𢹋	𢹌	𢹍	𢹎	𢹏
U+22E5x	𢹐	𢹑	𢹒	𢹓	𢹔	𢹕	𢹖	𢹗	𢹘	𢹙	𢹚	𢹛	𢹜	𢹝	𢹞	𢹟
U+22E6x	𢹠	𢹡	𢹢	𢹣	𢹤	𢹥	𢹦	𢹧	𢹨	𢹩	𢹪	𢹫	𢹬	𢹭	𢹮	𢹯
U+22E7x	𢹰	𢹱	𢹲	𢹳	𢹴	𢹵	𢹶	𢹷	𢹸	𢹹	𢹺	𢹻	𢹼	𢹽	𢹾	𢹿
U+22E8x	𢺀	𢺁	𢺂	𢺃	𢺄	𢺅	𢺆	𢺇	𢺈	𢺉	𢺊	𢺋	𢺌	𢺍	𢺎	𢺏
U+22E9x	𢺐	𢺑	𢺒	𢺓	𢺔	𢺕	𢺖	𢺗	𢺘	𢺙	𢺚	𢺛	𢺜	𢺝	𢺞	𢺟
U+22EAx	𢺠	𢺡	𢺢	𢺣	𢺤	𢺥	𢺦	𢺧	𢺨	𢺩	𢺪	𢺫	𢺬	𢺭	𢺮	𢺯
U+22EBx	𢺰	𢺱	𢺲	𢺳	𢺴	𢺵	𢺶	𢺷	𢺸	𢺹	𢺺	𢺻	𢺼	𢺽	𢺾	𢺿
U+22ECx	𢻀	𢻁	𢻂	𢻃	𢻄	𢻅	𢻆	𢻇	𢻈	𢻉	𢻊	𢻋	𢻌	𢻍	𢻎	𢻏
U+22EDx	𢻐	𢻑	𢻒	𢻓	𢻔	𢻕	𢻖	𢻗	𢻘	𢻙	𢻚	𢻛	𢻜	𢻝	𢻞	𢻟
U+22EEx	𢻠	𢻡	𢻢	𢻣	𢻤	𢻥	𢻦	𢻧	𢻨	𢻩	𢻪	𢻫	𢻬	𢻭	𢻮	𢻯
U+22EFx	𢻰	𢻱	𢻲	𢻳	𢻴	𢻵	𢻶	𢻷	𢻸	𢻹	𢻺	𢻻	𢻼	𢻽	𢻾	𢻿
U+22F0x	𢼀	𢼁	𢼂	𢼃	𢼄	𢼅	𢼆	𢼇	𢼈	𢼉	𢼊	𢼋	𢼌	𢼍	𢼎	𢼏
U+22F1x	𢼐	𢼑	𢼒	𢼓	𢼔	𢼕	𢼖	𢼗	𢼘	𢼙	𢼚	𢼛	𢼜	𢼝	𢼞	𢼟
U+22F2x	𢼠	𢼡	𢼢	𢼣	𢼤	𢼥	𢼦	𢼧	𢼨	𢼩	𢼪	𢼫	𢼬	𢼭	𢼮	𢼯
U+22F3x	𢼰	𢼱	𢼲	𢼳	𢼴	𢼵	𢼶	𢼷	𢼸	𢼹	𢼺	𢼻	𢼼	𢼽	𢼾	𢼿
U+22F4x	𢽀	𢽁	𢽂	𢽃	𢽄	𢽅	𢽆	𢽇	𢽈	𢽉	𢽊	𢽋	𢽌	𢽍	𢽎	𢽏
U+22F5x	𢽐	𢽑	𢽒	𢽓	𢽔	𢽕	𢽖	𢽗	𢽘	𢽙	𢽚	𢽛	𢽜	𢽝	𢽞	𢽟
U+22F6x	𢽠	𢽡	𢽢	𢽣	𢽤	𢽥	𢽦	𢽧	𢽨	𢽩	𢽪	𢽫	𢽬	𢽭	𢽮	𢽯
U+22F7x	𢽰	𢽱	𢽲	𢽳	𢽴	𢽵	𢽶	𢽷	𢽸	𢽹	𢽺	𢽻	𢽼	𢽽	𢽾	𢽿
U+22F8x	𢾀	𢾁	𢾂	𢾃	𢾄	𢾅	𢾆	𢾇	𢾈	𢾉	𢾊	𢾋	𢾌	𢾍	𢾎	𢾏
U+22F9x	𢾐	𢾑	𢾒	𢾓	𢾔	𢾕	𢾖	𢾗	𢾘	𢾙	𢾚	𢾛	𢾜	𢾝	𢾞	𢾟
U+22FAx	𢾠	𢾡	𢾢	𢾣	𢾤	𢾥	𢾦	𢾧	𢾨	𢾩	𢾪	𢾫	𢾬	𢾭	𢾮	𢾯
U+22FBx	𢾰	𢾱	𢾲	𢾳	𢾴	𢾵	𢾶	𢾷	𢾸	𢾹	𢾺	𢾻	𢾼	𢾽	𢾾	𢾿
U+22FCx	𢿀	𢿁	𢿂	𢿃	𢿄	𢿅	𢿆	𢿇	𢿈	𢿉	𢿊	𢿋	𢿌	𢿍	𢿎	𢿏
U+22FDx	𢿐	𢿑	𢿒	𢿓	𢿔	𢿕	𢿖	𢿗	𢿘	𢿙	𢿚	𢿛	𢿜	𢿝	𢿞	𢿟
U+22FEx	𢿠	𢿡	𢿢	𢿣	𢿤	𢿥	𢿦	𢿧	𢿨	𢿩	𢿪	𢿫	𢿬	𢿭	𢿮	𢿯
U+22FFx	𢿰	𢿱	𢿲	𢿳	𢿴	𢿵	𢿶	𢿷	𢿸	𢿹	𢿺	𢿻	𢿼	𢿽	𢿾	𢿿
U+2300x	𣀀	𣀁	𣀂	𣀃	𣀄	𣀅	𣀆	𣀇	𣀈	𣀉	𣀊	𣀋	𣀌	𣀍	𣀎	𣀏
U+2301x	𣀐	𣀑	𣀒	𣀓	𣀔	𣀕	𣀖	𣀗	𣀘	𣀙	𣀚	𣀛	𣀜	𣀝	𣀞	𣀟
U+2302x	𣀠	𣀡	𣀢	𣀣	𣀤	𣀥	𣀦	𣀧	𣀨	𣀩	𣀪	𣀫	𣀬	𣀭	𣀮	𣀯
U+2303x	𣀰	𣀱	𣀲	𣀳	𣀴	𣀵	𣀶	𣀷	𣀸	𣀹	𣀺	𣀻	𣀼	𣀽	𣀾	𣀿
U+2304x	𣁀	𣁁	𣁂	𣁃	𣁄	𣁅	𣁆	𣁇	𣁈	𣁉	𣁊	𣁋	𣁌	𣁍	𣁎	𣁏
U+2305x	𣁐	𣁑	𣁒	𣁓	𣁔	𣁕	𣁖	𣁗	𣁘	𣁙	𣁚	𣁛	𣁜	𣁝	𣁞	𣁟
U+2306x	𣁠	𣁡	𣁢	𣁣	𣁤	𣁥	𣁦	𣁧	𣁨	𣁩	𣁪	𣁫	𣁬	𣁭	𣁮	𣁯
U+2307x	𣁰	𣁱	𣁲	𣁳	𣁴	𣁵	𣁶	𣁷	𣁸	𣁹	𣁺	𣁻	𣁼	𣁽	𣁾	𣁿
U+2308x	𣂀	𣂁	𣂂	𣂃	𣂄	𣂅	𣂆	𣂇	𣂈	𣂉	𣂊	𣂋	𣂌	𣂍	𣂎	𣂏
U+2309x	𣂐	𣂑	𣂒	𣂓	𣂔	𣂕	𣂖	𣂗	𣂘	𣂙	𣂚	𣂛	𣂜	𣂝	𣂞	𣂟
U+230Ax	𣂠	𣂡	𣂢	𣂣	𣂤	𣂥	𣂦	𣂧	𣂨	𣂩	𣂪	𣂫	𣂬	𣂭	𣂮	𣂯
U+230Bx	𣂰	𣂱	𣂲	𣂳	𣂴	𣂵	𣂶	𣂷	𣂸	𣂹	𣂺	𣂻	𣂼	𣂽	𣂾	𣂿
U+230Cx	𣃀	𣃁	𣃂	𣃃	𣃄	𣃅	𣃆	𣃇	𣃈	𣃉	𣃊	𣃋	𣃌	𣃍	𣃎	𣃏
U+230Dx	𣃐	𣃑	𣃒	𣃓	𣃔	𣃕	𣃖	𣃗	𣃘	𣃙	𣃚	𣃛	𣃜	𣃝	𣃞	𣃟
U+230Ex	𣃠	𣃡	𣃢	𣃣	𣃤	𣃥	𣃦	𣃧	𣃨	𣃩	𣃪	𣃫	𣃬	𣃭	𣃮	𣃯
U+230Fx	𣃰	𣃱	𣃲	𣃳	𣃴	𣃵	𣃶	𣃷	𣃸	𣃹	𣃺	𣃻	𣃼	𣃽	𣃾	𣃿
U+2310x	𣄀	𣄁	𣄂	𣄃	𣄄	𣄅	𣄆	𣄇	𣄈	𣄉	𣄊	𣄋	𣄌	𣄍	𣄎	𣄏
U+2311x	𣄐	𣄑	𣄒	𣄓	𣄔	𣄕	𣄖	𣄗	𣄘	𣄙	𣄚	𣄛	𣄜	𣄝	𣄞	𣄟
U+2312x	𣄠	𣄡	𣄢	𣄣	𣄤	𣄥	𣄦	𣄧	𣄨	𣄩	𣄪	𣄫	𣄬	𣄭	𣄮	𣄯
U+2313x	𣄰	𣄱	𣄲	𣄳	𣄴	𣄵	𣄶	𣄷	𣄸	𣄹	𣄺	𣄻	𣄼	𣄽	𣄾	𣄿
U+2314x	𣅀	𣅁	𣅂	𣅃	𣅄	𣅅	𣅆	𣅇	𣅈	𣅉	𣅊	𣅋	𣅌	𣅍	𣅎	𣅏
U+2315x	𣅐	𣅑	𣅒	𣅓	𣅔	𣅕	𣅖	𣅗	𣅘	𣅙	𣅚	𣅛	𣅜	𣅝	𣅞	𣅟
U+2316x	𣅠	𣅡	𣅢	𣅣	𣅤	𣅥	𣅦	𣅧	𣅨	𣅩	𣅪	𣅫	𣅬	𣅭	𣅮	𣅯
U+2317x	𣅰	𣅱	𣅲	𣅳	𣅴	𣅵	𣅶	𣅷	𣅸	𣅹	𣅺	𣅻	𣅼	𣅽	𣅾	𣅿
U+2318x	𣆀	𣆁	𣆂	𣆃	𣆄	𣆅	𣆆	𣆇	𣆈	𣆉	𣆊	𣆋	𣆌	𣆍	𣆎	𣆏
U+2319x	𣆐	𣆑	𣆒	𣆓	𣆔	𣆕	𣆖	𣆗	𣆘	𣆙	𣆚	𣆛	𣆜	𣆝	𣆞	𣆟
U+231Ax	𣆠	𣆡	𣆢	𣆣	𣆤	𣆥	𣆦	𣆧	𣆨	𣆩	𣆪	𣆫	𣆬	𣆭	𣆮	𣆯
U+231Bx	𣆰	𣆱	𣆲	𣆳	𣆴	𣆵	𣆶	𣆷	𣆸	𣆹	𣆺	𣆻	𣆼	𣆽	𣆾	𣆿
U+231Cx	𣇀	𣇁	𣇂	𣇃	𣇄	𣇅	𣇆	𣇇	𣇈	𣇉	𣇊	𣇋	𣇌	𣇍	𣇎	𣇏
U+231Dx	𣇐	𣇑	𣇒	𣇓	𣇔	𣇕	𣇖	𣇗	𣇘	𣇙	𣇚	𣇛	𣇜	𣇝	𣇞	𣇟
U+231Ex	𣇠	𣇡	𣇢	𣇣	𣇤	𣇥	𣇦	𣇧	𣇨	𣇩	𣇪	𣇫	𣇬	𣇭	𣇮	𣇯
U+231Fx	𣇰	𣇱	𣇲	𣇳	𣇴	𣇵	𣇶	𣇷	𣇸	𣇹	𣇺	𣇻	𣇼	𣇽	𣇾	𣇿
U+2320x	𣈀	𣈁	𣈂	𣈃	𣈄	𣈅	𣈆	𣈇	𣈈	𣈉	𣈊	𣈋	𣈌	𣈍	𣈎	𣈏
U+2321x	𣈐	𣈑	𣈒	𣈓	𣈔	𣈕	𣈖	𣈗	𣈘	𣈙	𣈚	𣈛	𣈜	𣈝	𣈞	𣈟
U+2322x	𣈠	𣈡	𣈢	𣈣	𣈤	𣈥	𣈦	𣈧	𣈨	𣈩	𣈪	𣈫	𣈬	𣈭	𣈮	𣈯
U+2323x	𣈰	𣈱	𣈲	𣈳	𣈴	𣈵	𣈶	𣈷	𣈸	𣈹	𣈺	𣈻	𣈼	𣈽	𣈾	𣈿
U+2324x	𣉀	𣉁	𣉂	𣉃	𣉄	𣉅	𣉆	𣉇	𣉈	𣉉	𣉊	𣉋	𣉌	𣉍	𣉎	𣉏
U+2325x	𣉐	𣉑	𣉒	𣉓	𣉔	𣉕	𣉖	𣉗	𣉘	𣉙	𣉚	𣉛	𣉜	𣉝	𣉞	𣉟
U+2326x	𣉠	𣉡	𣉢	𣉣	𣉤	𣉥	𣉦	𣉧	𣉨	𣉩	𣉪	𣉫	𣉬	𣉭	𣉮	𣉯
U+2327x	𣉰	𣉱	𣉲	𣉳	𣉴	𣉵	𣉶	𣉷	𣉸	𣉹	𣉺	𣉻	𣉼	𣉽	𣉾	𣉿
U+2328x	𣊀	𣊁	𣊂	𣊃	𣊄	𣊅	𣊆	𣊇	𣊈	𣊉	𣊊	𣊋	𣊌	𣊍	𣊎	𣊏
U+2329x	𣊐	𣊑	𣊒	𣊓	𣊔	𣊕	𣊖	𣊗	𣊘	𣊙	𣊚	𣊛	𣊜	𣊝	𣊞	𣊟
U+232Ax	𣊠	𣊡	𣊢	𣊣	𣊤	𣊥	𣊦	𣊧	𣊨	𣊩	𣊪	𣊫	𣊬	𣊭	𣊮	𣊯
U+232Bx	𣊰	𣊱	𣊲	𣊳	𣊴	𣊵	𣊶	𣊷	𣊸	𣊹	𣊺	𣊻	𣊼	𣊽	𣊾	𣊿
U+232Cx	𣋀	𣋁	𣋂	𣋃	𣋄	𣋅	𣋆	𣋇	𣋈	𣋉	𣋊	𣋋	𣋌	𣋍	𣋎	𣋏
U+232Dx	𣋐	𣋑	𣋒	𣋓	𣋔	𣋕	𣋖	𣋗	𣋘	𣋙	𣋚	𣋛	𣋜	𣋝	𣋞	𣋟
U+232Ex	𣋠	𣋡	𣋢	𣋣	𣋤	𣋥	𣋦	𣋧	𣋨	𣋩	𣋪	𣋫	𣋬	𣋭	𣋮	𣋯
U+232Fx	𣋰	𣋱	𣋲	𣋳	𣋴	𣋵	𣋶	𣋷	𣋸	𣋹	𣋺	𣋻	𣋼	𣋽	𣋾	𣋿
U+2330x	𣌀	𣌁	𣌂	𣌃	𣌄	𣌅	𣌆	𣌇	𣌈	𣌉	𣌊	𣌋	𣌌	𣌍	𣌎	𣌏
U+2331x	𣌐	𣌑	𣌒	𣌓	𣌔	𣌕	𣌖	𣌗	𣌘	𣌙	𣌚	𣌛	𣌜	𣌝	𣌞	𣌟
U+2332x	𣌠	𣌡	𣌢	𣌣	𣌤	𣌥	𣌦	𣌧	𣌨	𣌩	𣌪	𣌫	𣌬	𣌭	𣌮	𣌯
U+2333x	𣌰	𣌱	𣌲	𣌳	𣌴	𣌵	𣌶	𣌷	𣌸	𣌹	𣌺	𣌻	𣌼	𣌽	𣌾	𣌿
U+2334x	𣍀	𣍁	𣍂	𣍃	𣍄	𣍅	𣍆	𣍇	𣍈	𣍉	𣍊	𣍋	𣍌	𣍍	𣍎	𣍏
U+2335x	𣍐	𣍑	𣍒	𣍓	𣍔	𣍕	𣍖	𣍗	𣍘	𣍙	𣍚	𣍛	𣍜	𣍝	𣍞	𣍟
U+2336x	𣍠	𣍡	𣍢	𣍣	𣍤	𣍥	𣍦	𣍧	𣍨	𣍩	𣍪	𣍫	𣍬	𣍭	𣍮	𣍯
U+2337x	𣍰	𣍱	𣍲	𣍳	𣍴	𣍵	𣍶	𣍷	𣍸	𣍹	𣍺	𣍻	𣍼	𣍽	𣍾	𣍿
U+2338x	𣎀	𣎁	𣎂	𣎃	𣎄	𣎅	𣎆	𣎇	𣎈	𣎉	𣎊	𣎋	𣎌	𣎍	𣎎	𣎏
U+2339x	𣎐	𣎑	𣎒	𣎓	𣎔	𣎕	𣎖	𣎗	𣎘	𣎙	𣎚	𣎛	𣎜	𣎝	𣎞	𣎟
U+233Ax	𣎠	𣎡	𣎢	𣎣	𣎤	𣎥	𣎦	𣎧	𣎨	𣎩	𣎪	𣎫	𣎬	𣎭	𣎮	𣎯
U+233Bx	𣎰	𣎱	𣎲	𣎳	𣎴	𣎵	𣎶	𣎷	𣎸	𣎹	𣎺	𣎻	𣎼	𣎽	𣎾	𣎿
U+233Cx	𣏀	𣏁	𣏂	𣏃	𣏄	𣏅	𣏆	𣏇	𣏈	𣏉	𣏊	𣏋	𣏌	𣏍	𣏎	𣏏
U+233Dx	𣏐	𣏑	𣏒	𣏓	𣏔	𣏕	𣏖	𣏗	𣏘	𣏙	𣏚	𣏛	𣏜	𣏝	𣏞	𣏟
U+233Ex	𣏠	𣏡	𣏢	𣏣	𣏤	𣏥	𣏦	𣏧	𣏨	𣏩	𣏪	𣏫	𣏬	𣏭	𣏮	𣏯
U+233Fx	𣏰	𣏱	𣏲	𣏳	𣏴	𣏵	𣏶	𣏷	𣏸	𣏹	𣏺	𣏻	𣏼	𣏽	𣏾	𣏿
U+2340x	𣐀	𣐁	𣐂	𣐃	𣐄	𣐅	𣐆	𣐇	𣐈	𣐉	𣐊	𣐋	𣐌	𣐍	𣐎	𣐏
U+2341x	𣐐	𣐑	𣐒	𣐓	𣐔	𣐕	𣐖	𣐗	𣐘	𣐙	𣐚	𣐛	𣐜	𣐝	𣐞	𣐟
U+2342x	𣐠	𣐡	𣐢	𣐣	𣐤	𣐥	𣐦	𣐧	𣐨	𣐩	𣐪	𣐫	𣐬	𣐭	𣐮	𣐯
U+2343x	𣐰	𣐱	𣐲	𣐳	𣐴	𣐵	𣐶	𣐷	𣐸	𣐹	𣐺	𣐻	𣐼	𣐽	𣐾	𣐿
U+2344x	𣑀	𣑁	𣑂	𣑃	𣑄	𣑅	𣑆	𣑇	𣑈	𣑉	𣑊	𣑋	𣑌	𣑍	𣑎	𣑏
U+2345x	𣑐	𣑑	𣑒	𣑓	𣑔	𣑕	𣑖	𣑗	𣑘	𣑙	𣑚	𣑛	𣑜	𣑝	𣑞	𣑟
U+2346x	𣑠	𣑡	𣑢	𣑣	𣑤	𣑥	𣑦	𣑧	𣑨	𣑩	𣑪	𣑫	𣑬	𣑭	𣑮	𣑯
U+2347x	𣑰	𣑱	𣑲	𣑳	𣑴	𣑵	𣑶	𣑷	𣑸	𣑹	𣑺	𣑻	𣑼	𣑽	𣑾	𣑿
U+2348x	𣒀	𣒁	𣒂	𣒃	𣒄	𣒅	𣒆	𣒇	𣒈	𣒉	𣒊	𣒋	𣒌	𣒍	𣒎	𣒏
U+2349x	𣒐	𣒑	𣒒	𣒓	𣒔	𣒕	𣒖	𣒗	𣒘	𣒙	𣒚	𣒛	𣒜	𣒝	𣒞	𣒟
U+234Ax	𣒠	𣒡	𣒢	𣒣	𣒤	𣒥	𣒦	𣒧	𣒨	𣒩	𣒪	𣒫	𣒬	𣒭	𣒮	𣒯
U+234Bx	𣒰	𣒱	𣒲	𣒳	𣒴	𣒵	𣒶	𣒷	𣒸	𣒹	𣒺	𣒻	𣒼	𣒽	𣒾	𣒿
U+234Cx	𣓀	𣓁	𣓂	𣓃	𣓄	𣓅	𣓆	𣓇	𣓈	𣓉	𣓊	𣓋	𣓌	𣓍	𣓎	𣓏
U+234Dx	𣓐	𣓑	𣓒	𣓓	𣓔	𣓕	𣓖	𣓗	𣓘	𣓙	𣓚	𣓛	𣓜	𣓝	𣓞	𣓟
U+234Ex	𣓠	𣓡	𣓢	𣓣	𣓤	𣓥	𣓦	𣓧	𣓨	𣓩	𣓪	𣓫	𣓬	𣓭	𣓮	𣓯
U+234Fx	𣓰	𣓱	𣓲	𣓳	𣓴	𣓵	𣓶	𣓷	𣓸	𣓹	𣓺	𣓻	𣓼	𣓽	𣓾	𣓿
U+2350x	𣔀	𣔁	𣔂	𣔃	𣔄	𣔅	𣔆	𣔇	𣔈	𣔉	𣔊	𣔋	𣔌	𣔍	𣔎	𣔏
U+2351x	𣔐	𣔑	𣔒	𣔓	𣔔	𣔕	𣔖	𣔗	𣔘	𣔙	𣔚	𣔛	𣔜	𣔝	𣔞	𣔟
U+2352x	𣔠	𣔡	𣔢	𣔣	𣔤	𣔥	𣔦	𣔧	𣔨	𣔩	𣔪	𣔫	𣔬	𣔭	𣔮	𣔯
U+2353x	𣔰	𣔱	𣔲	𣔳	𣔴	𣔵	𣔶	𣔷	𣔸	𣔹	𣔺	𣔻	𣔼	𣔽	𣔾	𣔿
U+2354x	𣕀	𣕁	𣕂	𣕃	𣕄	𣕅	𣕆	𣕇	𣕈	𣕉	𣕊	𣕋	𣕌	𣕍	𣕎	𣕏
U+2355x	𣕐	𣕑	𣕒	𣕓	𣕔	𣕕	𣕖	𣕗	𣕘	𣕙	𣕚	𣕛	𣕜	𣕝	𣕞	𣕟
U+2356x	𣕠	𣕡	𣕢	𣕣	𣕤	𣕥	𣕦	𣕧	𣕨	𣕩	𣕪	𣕫	𣕬	𣕭	𣕮	𣕯
U+2357x	𣕰	𣕱	𣕲	𣕳	𣕴	𣕵	𣕶	𣕷	𣕸	𣕹	𣕺	𣕻	𣕼	𣕽	𣕾	𣕿
U+2358x	𣖀	𣖁	𣖂	𣖃	𣖄	𣖅	𣖆	𣖇	𣖈	𣖉	𣖊	𣖋	𣖌	𣖍	𣖎	𣖏
U+2359x	𣖐	𣖑	𣖒	𣖓	𣖔	𣖕	𣖖	𣖗	𣖘	𣖙	𣖚	𣖛	𣖜	𣖝	𣖞	𣖟
U+235Ax	𣖠	𣖡	𣖢	𣖣	𣖤	𣖥	𣖦	𣖧	𣖨	𣖩	𣖪	𣖫	𣖬	𣖭	𣖮	𣖯
U+235Bx	𣖰	𣖱	𣖲	𣖳	𣖴	𣖵	𣖶	𣖷	𣖸	𣖹	𣖺	𣖻	𣖼	𣖽	𣖾	𣖿
U+235Cx	𣗀	𣗁	𣗂	𣗃	𣗄	𣗅	𣗆	𣗇	𣗈	𣗉	𣗊	𣗋	𣗌	𣗍	𣗎	𣗏
U+235Dx	𣗐	𣗑	𣗒	𣗓	𣗔	𣗕	𣗖	𣗗	𣗘	𣗙	𣗚	𣗛	𣗜	𣗝	𣗞	𣗟
U+235Ex	𣗠	𣗡	𣗢	𣗣	𣗤	𣗥	𣗦	𣗧	𣗨	𣗩	𣗪	𣗫	𣗬	𣗭	𣗮	𣗯
U+235Fx	𣗰	𣗱	𣗲	𣗳	𣗴	𣗵	𣗶	𣗷	𣗸	𣗹	𣗺	𣗻	𣗼	𣗽	𣗾	𣗿
U+2360x	𣘀	𣘁	𣘂	𣘃	𣘄	𣘅	𣘆	𣘇	𣘈	𣘉	𣘊	𣘋	𣘌	𣘍	𣘎	𣘏
U+2361x	𣘐	𣘑	𣘒	𣘓	𣘔	𣘕	𣘖	𣘗	𣘘	𣘙	𣘚	𣘛	𣘜	𣘝	𣘞	𣘟
U+2362x	𣘠	𣘡	𣘢	𣘣	𣘤	𣘥	𣘦	𣘧	𣘨	𣘩	𣘪	𣘫	𣘬	𣘭	𣘮	𣘯
U+2363x	𣘰	𣘱	𣘲	𣘳	𣘴	𣘵	𣘶	𣘷	𣘸	𣘹	𣘺	𣘻	𣘼	𣘽	𣘾	𣘿
U+2364x	𣙀	𣙁	𣙂	𣙃	𣙄	𣙅	𣙆	𣙇	𣙈	𣙉	𣙊	𣙋	𣙌	𣙍	𣙎	𣙏
U+2365x	𣙐	𣙑	𣙒	𣙓	𣙔	𣙕	𣙖	𣙗	𣙘	𣙙	𣙚	𣙛	𣙜	𣙝	𣙞	𣙟
U+2366x	𣙠	𣙡	𣙢	𣙣	𣙤	𣙥	𣙦	𣙧	𣙨	𣙩	𣙪	𣙫	𣙬	𣙭	𣙮	𣙯
U+2367x	𣙰	𣙱	𣙲	𣙳	𣙴	𣙵	𣙶	𣙷	𣙸	𣙹	𣙺	𣙻	𣙼	𣙽	𣙾	𣙿
U+2368x	𣚀	𣚁	𣚂	𣚃	𣚄	𣚅	𣚆	𣚇	𣚈	𣚉	𣚊	𣚋	𣚌	𣚍	𣚎	𣚏
U+2369x	𣚐	𣚑	𣚒	𣚓	𣚔	𣚕	𣚖	𣚗	𣚘	𣚙	𣚚	𣚛	𣚜	𣚝	𣚞	𣚟
U+236Ax	𣚠	𣚡	𣚢	𣚣	𣚤	𣚥	𣚦	𣚧	𣚨	𣚩	𣚪	𣚫	𣚬	𣚭	𣚮	𣚯
U+236Bx	𣚰	𣚱	𣚲	𣚳	𣚴	𣚵	𣚶	𣚷	𣚸	𣚹	𣚺	𣚻	𣚼	𣚽	𣚾	𣚿
U+236Cx	𣛀	𣛁	𣛂	𣛃	𣛄	𣛅	𣛆	𣛇	𣛈	𣛉	𣛊	𣛋	𣛌	𣛍	𣛎	𣛏
U+236Dx	𣛐	𣛑	𣛒	𣛓	𣛔	𣛕	𣛖	𣛗	𣛘	𣛙	𣛚	𣛛	𣛜	𣛝	𣛞	𣛟
U+236Ex	𣛠	𣛡	𣛢	𣛣	𣛤	𣛥	𣛦	𣛧	𣛨	𣛩	𣛪	𣛫	𣛬	𣛭	𣛮	𣛯
U+236Fx	𣛰	𣛱	𣛲	𣛳	𣛴	𣛵	𣛶	𣛷	𣛸	𣛹	𣛺	𣛻	𣛼	𣛽	𣛾	𣛿
U+2370x	𣜀	𣜁	𣜂	𣜃	𣜄	𣜅	𣜆	𣜇	𣜈	𣜉	𣜊	𣜋	𣜌	𣜍	𣜎	𣜏
U+2371x	𣜐	𣜑	𣜒	𣜓	𣜔	𣜕	𣜖	𣜗	𣜘	𣜙	𣜚	𣜛	𣜜	𣜝	𣜞	𣜟
U+2372x	𣜠	𣜡	𣜢	𣜣	𣜤	𣜥	𣜦	𣜧	𣜨	𣜩	𣜪	𣜫	𣜬	𣜭	𣜮	𣜯
U+2373x	𣜰	𣜱	𣜲	𣜳	𣜴	𣜵	𣜶	𣜷	𣜸	𣜹	𣜺	𣜻	𣜼	𣜽	𣜾	𣜿
U+2374x	𣝀	𣝁	𣝂	𣝃	𣝄	𣝅	𣝆	𣝇	𣝈	𣝉	𣝊	𣝋	𣝌	𣝍	𣝎	𣝏
U+2375x	𣝐	𣝑	𣝒	𣝓	𣝔	𣝕	𣝖	𣝗	𣝘	𣝙	𣝚	𣝛	𣝜	𣝝	𣝞	𣝟
U+2376x	𣝠	𣝡	𣝢	𣝣	𣝤	𣝥	𣝦	𣝧	𣝨	𣝩	𣝪	𣝫	𣝬	𣝭	𣝮	𣝯
U+2377x	𣝰	𣝱	𣝲	𣝳	𣝴	𣝵	𣝶	𣝷	𣝸	𣝹	𣝺	𣝻	𣝼	𣝽	𣝾	𣝿
U+2378x	𣞀	𣞁	𣞂	𣞃	𣞄	𣞅	𣞆	𣞇	𣞈	𣞉	𣞊	𣞋	𣞌	𣞍	𣞎	𣞏
U+2379x	𣞐	𣞑	𣞒	𣞓	𣞔	𣞕	𣞖	𣞗	𣞘	𣞙	𣞚	𣞛	𣞜	𣞝	𣞞	𣞟
U+237Ax	𣞠	𣞡	𣞢	𣞣	𣞤	𣞥	𣞦	𣞧	𣞨	𣞩	𣞪	𣞫	𣞬	𣞭	𣞮	𣞯
U+237Bx	𣞰	𣞱	𣞲	𣞳	𣞴	𣞵	𣞶	𣞷	𣞸	𣞹	𣞺	𣞻	𣞼	𣞽	𣞾	𣞿
U+237Cx	𣟀	𣟁	𣟂	𣟃	𣟄	𣟅	𣟆	𣟇	𣟈	𣟉	𣟊	𣟋	𣟌	𣟍	𣟎	𣟏
U+237Dx	𣟐	𣟑	𣟒	𣟓	𣟔	𣟕	𣟖	𣟗	𣟘	𣟙	𣟚	𣟛	𣟜	𣟝	𣟞	𣟟
U+237Ex	𣟠	𣟡	𣟢	𣟣	𣟤	𣟥	𣟦	𣟧	𣟨	𣟩	𣟪	𣟫	𣟬	𣟭	𣟮	𣟯
U+237Fx	𣟰	𣟱	𣟲	𣟳	𣟴	𣟵	𣟶	𣟷	𣟸	𣟹	𣟺	𣟻	𣟼	𣟽	𣟾	𣟿
U+2380x	𣠀	𣠁	𣠂	𣠃	𣠄	𣠅	𣠆	𣠇	𣠈	𣠉	𣠊	𣠋	𣠌	𣠍	𣠎	𣠏
U+2381x	𣠐	𣠑	𣠒	𣠓	𣠔	𣠕	𣠖	𣠗	𣠘	𣠙	𣠚	𣠛	𣠜	𣠝	𣠞	𣠟
U+2382x	𣠠	𣠡	𣠢	𣠣	𣠤	𣠥	𣠦	𣠧	𣠨	𣠩	𣠪	𣠫	𣠬	𣠭	𣠮	𣠯
U+2383x	𣠰	𣠱	𣠲	𣠳	𣠴	𣠵	𣠶	𣠷	𣠸	𣠹	𣠺	𣠻	𣠼	𣠽	𣠾	𣠿
U+2384x	𣡀	𣡁	𣡂	𣡃	𣡄	𣡅	𣡆	𣡇	𣡈	𣡉	𣡊	𣡋	𣡌	𣡍	𣡎	𣡏
U+2385x	𣡐	𣡑	𣡒	𣡓	𣡔	𣡕	𣡖	𣡗	𣡘	𣡙	𣡚	𣡛	𣡜	𣡝	𣡞	𣡟
U+2386x	𣡠	𣡡	𣡢	𣡣	𣡤	𣡥	𣡦	𣡧	𣡨	𣡩	𣡪	𣡫	𣡬	𣡭	𣡮	𣡯
U+2387x	𣡰	𣡱	𣡲	𣡳	𣡴	𣡵	𣡶	𣡷	𣡸	𣡹	𣡺	𣡻	𣡼	𣡽	𣡾	𣡿
U+2388x	𣢀	𣢁	𣢂	𣢃	𣢄	𣢅	𣢆	𣢇	𣢈	𣢉	𣢊	𣢋	𣢌	𣢍	𣢎	𣢏
U+2389x	𣢐	𣢑	𣢒	𣢓	𣢔	𣢕	𣢖	𣢗	𣢘	𣢙	𣢚	𣢛	𣢜	𣢝	𣢞	𣢟
U+238Ax	𣢠	𣢡	𣢢	𣢣	𣢤	𣢥	𣢦	𣢧	𣢨	𣢩	𣢪	𣢫	𣢬	𣢭	𣢮	𣢯
U+238Bx	𣢰	𣢱	𣢲	𣢳	𣢴	𣢵	𣢶	𣢷	𣢸	𣢹	𣢺	𣢻	𣢼	𣢽	𣢾	𣢿
U+238Cx	𣣀	𣣁	𣣂	𣣃	𣣄	𣣅	𣣆	𣣇	𣣈	𣣉	𣣊	𣣋	𣣌	𣣍	𣣎	𣣏
U+238Dx	𣣐	𣣑	𣣒	𣣓	𣣔	𣣕	𣣖	𣣗	𣣘	𣣙	𣣚	𣣛	𣣜	𣣝	𣣞	𣣟
U+238Ex	𣣠	𣣡	𣣢	𣣣	𣣤	𣣥	𣣦	𣣧	𣣨	𣣩	𣣪	𣣫	𣣬	𣣭	𣣮	𣣯
U+238Fx	𣣰	𣣱	𣣲	𣣳	𣣴	𣣵	𣣶	𣣷	𣣸	𣣹	𣣺	𣣻	𣣼	𣣽	𣣾	𣣿
U+2390x	𣤀	𣤁	𣤂	𣤃	𣤄	𣤅	𣤆	𣤇	𣤈	𣤉	𣤊	𣤋	𣤌	𣤍	𣤎	𣤏
U+2391x	𣤐	𣤑	𣤒	𣤓	𣤔	𣤕	𣤖	𣤗	𣤘	𣤙	𣤚	𣤛	𣤜	𣤝	𣤞	𣤟
U+2392x	𣤠	𣤡	𣤢	𣤣	𣤤	𣤥	𣤦	𣤧	𣤨	𣤩	𣤪	𣤫	𣤬	𣤭	𣤮	𣤯
U+2393x	𣤰	𣤱	𣤲	𣤳	𣤴	𣤵	𣤶	𣤷	𣤸	𣤹	𣤺	𣤻	𣤼	𣤽	𣤾	𣤿
U+2394x	𣥀	𣥁	𣥂	𣥃	𣥄	𣥅	𣥆	𣥇	𣥈	𣥉	𣥊	𣥋	𣥌	𣥍	𣥎	𣥏
U+2395x	𣥐	𣥑	𣥒	𣥓	𣥔	𣥕	𣥖	𣥗	𣥘	𣥙	𣥚	𣥛	𣥜	𣥝	𣥞	𣥟
U+2396x	𣥠	𣥡	𣥢	𣥣	𣥤	𣥥	𣥦	𣥧	𣥨	𣥩	𣥪	𣥫	𣥬	𣥭	𣥮	𣥯
U+2397x	𣥰	𣥱	𣥲	𣥳	𣥴	𣥵	𣥶	𣥷	𣥸	𣥹	𣥺	𣥻	𣥼	𣥽	𣥾	𣥿
U+2398x	𣦀	𣦁	𣦂	𣦃	𣦄	𣦅	𣦆	𣦇	𣦈	𣦉	𣦊	𣦋	𣦌	𣦍	𣦎	𣦏
U+2399x	𣦐	𣦑	𣦒	𣦓	𣦔	𣦕	𣦖	𣦗	𣦘	𣦙	𣦚	𣦛	𣦜	𣦝	𣦞	𣦟
U+239Ax	𣦠	𣦡	𣦢	𣦣	𣦤	𣦥	𣦦	𣦧	𣦨	𣦩	𣦪	𣦫	𣦬	𣦭	𣦮	𣦯
U+239Bx	𣦰	𣦱	𣦲	𣦳	𣦴	𣦵	𣦶	𣦷	𣦸	𣦹	𣦺	𣦻	𣦼	𣦽	𣦾	𣦿
U+239Cx	𣧀	𣧁	𣧂	𣧃	𣧄	𣧅	𣧆	𣧇	𣧈	𣧉	𣧊	𣧋	𣧌	𣧍	𣧎	𣧏
U+239Dx	𣧐	𣧑	𣧒	𣧓	𣧔	𣧕	𣧖	𣧗	𣧘	𣧙	𣧚	𣧛	𣧜	𣧝	𣧞	𣧟
U+239Ex	𣧠	𣧡	𣧢	𣧣	𣧤	𣧥	𣧦	𣧧	𣧨	𣧩	𣧪	𣧫	𣧬	𣧭	𣧮	𣧯
U+239Fx	𣧰	𣧱	𣧲	𣧳	𣧴	𣧵	𣧶	𣧷	𣧸	𣧹	𣧺	𣧻	𣧼	𣧽	𣧾	𣧿
U+23A0x	𣨀	𣨁	𣨂	𣨃	𣨄	𣨅	𣨆	𣨇	𣨈	𣨉	𣨊	𣨋	𣨌	𣨍	𣨎	𣨏
U+23A1x	𣨐	𣨑	𣨒	𣨓	𣨔	𣨕	𣨖	𣨗	𣨘	𣨙	𣨚	𣨛	𣨜	𣨝	𣨞	𣨟
U+23A2x	𣨠	𣨡	𣨢	𣨣	𣨤	𣨥	𣨦	𣨧	𣨨	𣨩	𣨪	𣨫	𣨬	𣨭	𣨮	𣨯
U+23A3x	𣨰	𣨱	𣨲	𣨳	𣨴	𣨵	𣨶	𣨷	𣨸	𣨹	𣨺	𣨻	𣨼	𣨽	𣨾	𣨿
U+23A4x	𣩀	𣩁	𣩂	𣩃	𣩄	𣩅	𣩆	𣩇	𣩈	𣩉	𣩊	𣩋	𣩌	𣩍	𣩎	𣩏
U+23A5x	𣩐	𣩑	𣩒	𣩓	𣩔	𣩕	𣩖	𣩗	𣩘	𣩙	𣩚	𣩛	𣩜	𣩝	𣩞	𣩟
U+23A6x	𣩠	𣩡	𣩢	𣩣	𣩤	𣩥	𣩦	𣩧	𣩨	𣩩	𣩪	𣩫	𣩬	𣩭	𣩮	𣩯
U+23A7x	𣩰	𣩱	𣩲	𣩳	𣩴	𣩵	𣩶	𣩷	𣩸	𣩹	𣩺	𣩻	𣩼	𣩽	𣩾	𣩿
U+23A8x	𣪀	𣪁	𣪂	𣪃	𣪄	𣪅	𣪆	𣪇	𣪈	𣪉	𣪊	𣪋	𣪌	𣪍	𣪎	𣪏
U+23A9x	𣪐	𣪑	𣪒	𣪓	𣪔	𣪕	𣪖	𣪗	𣪘	𣪙	𣪚	𣪛	𣪜	𣪝	𣪞	𣪟
U+23AAx	𣪠	𣪡	𣪢	𣪣	𣪤	𣪥	𣪦	𣪧	𣪨	𣪩	𣪪	𣪫	𣪬	𣪭	𣪮	𣪯
U+23ABx	𣪰	𣪱	𣪲	𣪳	𣪴	𣪵	𣪶	𣪷	𣪸	𣪹	𣪺	𣪻	𣪼	𣪽	𣪾	𣪿
U+23ACx	𣫀	𣫁	𣫂	𣫃	𣫄	𣫅	𣫆	𣫇	𣫈	𣫉	𣫊	𣫋	𣫌	𣫍	𣫎	𣫏
U+23ADx	𣫐	𣫑	𣫒	𣫓	𣫔	𣫕	𣫖	𣫗	𣫘	𣫙	𣫚	𣫛	𣫜	𣫝	𣫞	𣫟
U+23AEx	𣫠	𣫡	𣫢	𣫣	𣫤	𣫥	𣫦	𣫧	𣫨	𣫩	𣫪	𣫫	𣫬	𣫭	𣫮	𣫯
U+23AFx	𣫰	𣫱	𣫲	𣫳	𣫴	𣫵	𣫶	𣫷	𣫸	𣫹	𣫺	𣫻	𣫼	𣫽	𣫾	𣫿
U+23B0x	𣬀	𣬁	𣬂	𣬃	𣬄	𣬅	𣬆	𣬇	𣬈	𣬉	𣬊	𣬋	𣬌	𣬍	𣬎	𣬏
U+23B1x	𣬐	𣬑	𣬒	𣬓	𣬔	𣬕	𣬖	𣬗	𣬘	𣬙	𣬚	𣬛	𣬜	𣬝	𣬞	𣬟
U+23B2x	𣬠	𣬡	𣬢	𣬣	𣬤	𣬥	𣬦	𣬧	𣬨	𣬩	𣬪	𣬫	𣬬	𣬭	𣬮	𣬯
U+23B3x	𣬰	𣬱	𣬲	𣬳	𣬴	𣬵	𣬶	𣬷	𣬸	𣬹	𣬺	𣬻	𣬼	𣬽	𣬾	𣬿
U+23B4x	𣭀	𣭁	𣭂	𣭃	𣭄	𣭅	𣭆	𣭇	𣭈	𣭉	𣭊	𣭋	𣭌	𣭍	𣭎	𣭏
U+23B5x	𣭐	𣭑	𣭒	𣭓	𣭔	𣭕	𣭖	𣭗	𣭘	𣭙	𣭚	𣭛	𣭜	𣭝	𣭞	𣭟
U+23B6x	𣭠	𣭡	𣭢	𣭣	𣭤	𣭥	𣭦	𣭧	𣭨	𣭩	𣭪	𣭫	𣭬	𣭭	𣭮	𣭯
U+23B7x	𣭰	𣭱	𣭲	𣭳	𣭴	𣭵	𣭶	𣭷	𣭸	𣭹	𣭺	𣭻	𣭼	𣭽	𣭾	𣭿
U+23B8x	𣮀	𣮁	𣮂	𣮃	𣮄	𣮅	𣮆	𣮇	𣮈	𣮉	𣮊	𣮋	𣮌	𣮍	𣮎	𣮏
U+23B9x	𣮐	𣮑	𣮒	𣮓	𣮔	𣮕	𣮖	𣮗	𣮘	𣮙	𣮚	𣮛	𣮜	𣮝	𣮞	𣮟
U+23BAx	𣮠	𣮡	𣮢	𣮣	𣮤	𣮥	𣮦	𣮧	𣮨	𣮩	𣮪	𣮫	𣮬	𣮭	𣮮	𣮯
U+23BBx	𣮰	𣮱	𣮲	𣮳	𣮴	𣮵	𣮶	𣮷	𣮸	𣮹	𣮺	𣮻	𣮼	𣮽	𣮾	𣮿
U+23BCx	𣯀	𣯁	𣯂	𣯃	𣯄	𣯅	𣯆	𣯇	𣯈	𣯉	𣯊	𣯋	𣯌	𣯍	𣯎	𣯏
U+23BDx	𣯐	𣯑	𣯒	𣯓	𣯔	𣯕	𣯖	𣯗	𣯘	𣯙	𣯚	𣯛	𣯜	𣯝	𣯞	𣯟
U+23BEx	𣯠	𣯡	𣯢	𣯣	𣯤	𣯥	𣯦	𣯧	𣯨	𣯩	𣯪	𣯫	𣯬	𣯭	𣯮	𣯯
U+23BFx	𣯰	𣯱	𣯲	𣯳	𣯴	𣯵	𣯶	𣯷	𣯸	𣯹	𣯺	𣯻	𣯼	𣯽	𣯾	𣯿
U+23C0x	𣰀	𣰁	𣰂	𣰃	𣰄	𣰅	𣰆	𣰇	𣰈	𣰉	𣰊	𣰋	𣰌	𣰍	𣰎	𣰏
U+23C1x	𣰐	𣰑	𣰒	𣰓	𣰔	𣰕	𣰖	𣰗	𣰘	𣰙	𣰚	𣰛	𣰜	𣰝	𣰞	𣰟
U+23C2x	𣰠	𣰡	𣰢	𣰣	𣰤	𣰥	𣰦	𣰧	𣰨	𣰩	𣰪	𣰫	𣰬	𣰭	𣰮	𣰯
U+23C3x	𣰰	𣰱	𣰲	𣰳	𣰴	𣰵	𣰶	𣰷	𣰸	𣰹	𣰺	𣰻	𣰼	𣰽	𣰾	𣰿
U+23C4x	𣱀	𣱁	𣱂	𣱃	𣱄	𣱅	𣱆	𣱇	𣱈	𣱉	𣱊	𣱋	𣱌	𣱍	𣱎	𣱏
U+23C5x	𣱐	𣱑	𣱒	𣱓	𣱔	𣱕	𣱖	𣱗	𣱘	𣱙	𣱚	𣱛	𣱜	𣱝	𣱞	𣱟
U+23C6x	𣱠	𣱡	𣱢	𣱣	𣱤	𣱥	𣱦	𣱧	𣱨	𣱩	𣱪	𣱫	𣱬	𣱭	𣱮	𣱯
U+23C7x	𣱰	𣱱	𣱲	𣱳	𣱴	𣱵	𣱶	𣱷	𣱸	𣱹	𣱺	𣱻	𣱼	𣱽	𣱾	𣱿
U+23C8x	𣲀	𣲁	𣲂	𣲃	𣲄	𣲅	𣲆	𣲇	𣲈	𣲉	𣲊	𣲋	𣲌	𣲍	𣲎	𣲏
U+23C9x	𣲐	𣲑	𣲒	𣲓	𣲔	𣲕	𣲖	𣲗	𣲘	𣲙	𣲚	𣲛	𣲜	𣲝	𣲞	𣲟
U+23CAx	𣲠	𣲡	𣲢	𣲣	𣲤	𣲥	𣲦	𣲧	𣲨	𣲩	𣲪	𣲫	𣲬	𣲭	𣲮	𣲯
U+23CBx	𣲰	𣲱	𣲲	𣲳	𣲴	𣲵	𣲶	𣲷	𣲸	𣲹	𣲺	𣲻	𣲼	𣲽	𣲾	𣲿
U+23CCx	𣳀	𣳁	𣳂	𣳃	𣳄	𣳅	𣳆	𣳇	𣳈	𣳉	𣳊	𣳋	𣳌	𣳍	𣳎	𣳏
U+23CDx	𣳐	𣳑	𣳒	𣳓	𣳔	𣳕	𣳖	𣳗	𣳘	𣳙	𣳚	𣳛	𣳜	𣳝	𣳞	𣳟
U+23CEx	𣳠	𣳡	𣳢	𣳣	𣳤	𣳥	𣳦	𣳧	𣳨	𣳩	𣳪	𣳫	𣳬	𣳭	𣳮	𣳯
U+23CFx	𣳰	𣳱	𣳲	𣳳	𣳴	𣳵	𣳶	𣳷	𣳸	𣳹	𣳺	𣳻	𣳼	𣳽	𣳾	𣳿
U+23D0x	𣴀	𣴁	𣴂	𣴃	𣴄	𣴅	𣴆	𣴇	𣴈	𣴉	𣴊	𣴋	𣴌	𣴍	𣴎	𣴏
U+23D1x	𣴐	𣴑	𣴒	𣴓	𣴔	𣴕	𣴖	𣴗	𣴘	𣴙	𣴚	𣴛	𣴜	𣴝	𣴞	𣴟
U+23D2x	𣴠	𣴡	𣴢	𣴣	𣴤	𣴥	𣴦	𣴧	𣴨	𣴩	𣴪	𣴫	𣴬	𣴭	𣴮	𣴯
U+23D3x	𣴰	𣴱	𣴲	𣴳	𣴴	𣴵	𣴶	𣴷	𣴸	𣴹	𣴺	𣴻	𣴼	𣴽	𣴾	𣴿
U+23D4x	𣵀	𣵁	𣵂	𣵃	𣵄	𣵅	𣵆	𣵇	𣵈	𣵉	𣵊	𣵋	𣵌	𣵍	𣵎	𣵏
U+23D5x	𣵐	𣵑	𣵒	𣵓	𣵔	𣵕	𣵖	𣵗	𣵘	𣵙	𣵚	𣵛	𣵜	𣵝	𣵞	𣵟
U+23D6x	𣵠	𣵡	𣵢	𣵣	𣵤	𣵥	𣵦	𣵧	𣵨	𣵩	𣵪	𣵫	𣵬	𣵭	𣵮	𣵯
U+23D7x	𣵰	𣵱	𣵲	𣵳	𣵴	𣵵	𣵶	𣵷	𣵸	𣵹	𣵺	𣵻	𣵼	𣵽	𣵾	𣵿
U+23D8x	𣶀	𣶁	𣶂	𣶃	𣶄	𣶅	𣶆	𣶇	𣶈	𣶉	𣶊	𣶋	𣶌	𣶍	𣶎	𣶏
U+23D9x	𣶐	𣶑	𣶒	𣶓	𣶔	𣶕	𣶖	𣶗	𣶘	𣶙	𣶚	𣶛	𣶜	𣶝	𣶞	𣶟
U+23DAx	𣶠	𣶡	𣶢	𣶣	𣶤	𣶥	𣶦	𣶧	𣶨	𣶩	𣶪	𣶫	𣶬	𣶭	𣶮	𣶯
U+23DBx	𣶰	𣶱	𣶲	𣶳	𣶴	𣶵	𣶶	𣶷	𣶸	𣶹	𣶺	𣶻	𣶼	𣶽	𣶾	𣶿
U+23DCx	𣷀	𣷁	𣷂	𣷃	𣷄	𣷅	𣷆	𣷇	𣷈	𣷉	𣷊	𣷋	𣷌	𣷍	𣷎	𣷏
U+23DDx	𣷐	𣷑	𣷒	𣷓	𣷔	𣷕	𣷖	𣷗	𣷘	𣷙	𣷚	𣷛	𣷜	𣷝	𣷞	𣷟
U+23DEx	𣷠	𣷡	𣷢	𣷣	𣷤	𣷥	𣷦	𣷧	𣷨	𣷩	𣷪	𣷫	𣷬	𣷭	𣷮	𣷯
U+23DFx	𣷰	𣷱	𣷲	𣷳	𣷴	𣷵	𣷶	𣷷	𣷸	𣷹	𣷺	𣷻	𣷼	𣷽	𣷾	𣷿
U+23E0x	𣸀	𣸁	𣸂	𣸃	𣸄	𣸅	𣸆	𣸇	𣸈	𣸉	𣸊	𣸋	𣸌	𣸍	𣸎	𣸏
U+23E1x	𣸐	𣸑	𣸒	𣸓	𣸔	𣸕	𣸖	𣸗	𣸘	𣸙	𣸚	𣸛	𣸜	𣸝	𣸞	𣸟
U+23E2x	𣸠	𣸡	𣸢	𣸣	𣸤	𣸥	𣸦	𣸧	𣸨	𣸩	𣸪	𣸫	𣸬	𣸭	𣸮	𣸯
U+23E3x	𣸰	𣸱	𣸲	𣸳	𣸴	𣸵	𣸶	𣸷	𣸸	𣸹	𣸺	𣸻	𣸼	𣸽	𣸾	𣸿
U+23E4x	𣹀	𣹁	𣹂	𣹃	𣹄	𣹅	𣹆	𣹇	𣹈	𣹉	𣹊	𣹋	𣹌	𣹍	𣹎	𣹏
U+23E5x	𣹐	𣹑	𣹒	𣹓	𣹔	𣹕	𣹖	𣹗	𣹘	𣹙	𣹚	𣹛	𣹜	𣹝	𣹞	𣹟
U+23E6x	𣹠	𣹡	𣹢	𣹣	𣹤	𣹥	𣹦	𣹧	𣹨	𣹩	𣹪	𣹫	𣹬	𣹭	𣹮	𣹯
U+23E7x	𣹰	𣹱	𣹲	𣹳	𣹴	𣹵	𣹶	𣹷	𣹸	𣹹	𣹺	𣹻	𣹼	𣹽	𣹾	𣹿
U+23E8x	𣺀	𣺁	𣺂	𣺃	𣺄	𣺅	𣺆	𣺇	𣺈	𣺉	𣺊	𣺋	𣺌	𣺍	𣺎	𣺏
U+23E9x	𣺐	𣺑	𣺒	𣺓	𣺔	𣺕	𣺖	𣺗	𣺘	𣺙	𣺚	𣺛	𣺜	𣺝	𣺞	𣺟
U+23EAx	𣺠	𣺡	𣺢	𣺣	𣺤	𣺥	𣺦	𣺧	𣺨	𣺩	𣺪	𣺫	𣺬	𣺭	𣺮	𣺯
U+23EBx	𣺰	𣺱	𣺲	𣺳	𣺴	𣺵	𣺶	𣺷	𣺸	𣺹	𣺺	𣺻	𣺼	𣺽	𣺾	𣺿
U+23ECx	𣻀	𣻁	𣻂	𣻃	𣻄	𣻅	𣻆	𣻇	𣻈	𣻉	𣻊	𣻋	𣻌	𣻍	𣻎	𣻏
U+23EDx	𣻐	𣻑	𣻒	𣻓	𣻔	𣻕	𣻖	𣻗	𣻘	𣻙	𣻚	𣻛	𣻜	𣻝	𣻞	𣻟
U+23EEx	𣻠	𣻡	𣻢	𣻣	𣻤	𣻥	𣻦	𣻧	𣻨	𣻩	𣻪	𣻫	𣻬	𣻭	𣻮	𣻯
U+23EFx	𣻰	𣻱	𣻲	𣻳	𣻴	𣻵	𣻶	𣻷	𣻸	𣻹	𣻺	𣻻	𣻼	𣻽	𣻾	𣻿
U+23F0x	𣼀	𣼁	𣼂	𣼃	𣼄	𣼅	𣼆	𣼇	𣼈	𣼉	𣼊	𣼋	𣼌	𣼍	𣼎	𣼏
U+23F1x	𣼐	𣼑	𣼒	𣼓	𣼔	𣼕	𣼖	𣼗	𣼘	𣼙	𣼚	𣼛	𣼜	𣼝	𣼞	𣼟
U+23F2x	𣼠	𣼡	𣼢	𣼣	𣼤	𣼥	𣼦	𣼧	𣼨	𣼩	𣼪	𣼫	𣼬	𣼭	𣼮	𣼯
U+23F3x	𣼰	𣼱	𣼲	𣼳	𣼴	𣼵	𣼶	𣼷	𣼸	𣼹	𣼺	𣼻	𣼼	𣼽	𣼾	𣼿
U+23F4x	𣽀	𣽁	𣽂	𣽃	𣽄	𣽅	𣽆	𣽇	𣽈	𣽉	𣽊	𣽋	𣽌	𣽍	𣽎	𣽏
U+23F5x	𣽐	𣽑	𣽒	𣽓	𣽔	𣽕	𣽖	𣽗	𣽘	𣽙	𣽚	𣽛	𣽜	𣽝	𣽞	𣽟
U+23F6x	𣽠	𣽡	𣽢	𣽣	𣽤	𣽥	𣽦	𣽧	𣽨	𣽩	𣽪	𣽫	𣽬	𣽭	𣽮	𣽯
U+23F7x	𣽰	𣽱	𣽲	𣽳	𣽴	𣽵	𣽶	𣽷	𣽸	𣽹	𣽺	𣽻	𣽼	𣽽	𣽾	𣽿
U+23F8x	𣾀	𣾁	𣾂	𣾃	𣾄	𣾅	𣾆	𣾇	𣾈	𣾉	𣾊	𣾋	𣾌	𣾍	𣾎	𣾏
U+23F9x	𣾐	𣾑	𣾒	𣾓	𣾔	𣾕	𣾖	𣾗	𣾘	𣾙	𣾚	𣾛	𣾜	𣾝	𣾞	𣾟
U+23FAx	𣾠	𣾡	𣾢	𣾣	𣾤	𣾥	𣾦	𣾧	𣾨	𣾩	𣾪	𣾫	𣾬	𣾭	𣾮	𣾯
U+23FBx	𣾰	𣾱	𣾲	𣾳	𣾴	𣾵	𣾶	𣾷	𣾸	𣾹	𣾺	𣾻	𣾼	𣾽	𣾾	𣾿
U+23FCx	𣿀	𣿁	𣿂	𣿃	𣿄	𣿅	𣿆	𣿇	𣿈	𣿉	𣿊	𣿋	𣿌	𣿍	𣿎	𣿏
U+23FDx	𣿐	𣿑	𣿒	𣿓	𣿔	𣿕	𣿖	𣿗	𣿘	𣿙	𣿚	𣿛	𣿜	𣿝	𣿞	𣿟
U+23FEx	𣿠	𣿡	𣿢	𣿣	𣿤	𣿥	𣿦	𣿧	𣿨	𣿩	𣿪	𣿫	𣿬	𣿭	𣿮	𣿯
U+23FFx	𣿰	𣿱	𣿲	𣿳	𣿴	𣿵	𣿶	𣿷	𣿸	𣿹	𣿺	𣿻	𣿼	𣿽	𣿾	𣿿
U+2400x	𤀀	𤀁	𤀂	𤀃	𤀄	𤀅	𤀆	𤀇	𤀈	𤀉	𤀊	𤀋	𤀌	𤀍	𤀎	𤀏
U+2401x	𤀐	𤀑	𤀒	𤀓	𤀔	𤀕	𤀖	𤀗	𤀘	𤀙	𤀚	𤀛	𤀜	𤀝	𤀞	𤀟
U+2402x	𤀠	𤀡	𤀢	𤀣	𤀤	𤀥	𤀦	𤀧	𤀨	𤀩	𤀪	𤀫	𤀬	𤀭	𤀮	𤀯
U+2403x	𤀰	𤀱	𤀲	𤀳	𤀴	𤀵	𤀶	𤀷	𤀸	𤀹	𤀺	𤀻	𤀼	𤀽	𤀾	𤀿
U+2404x	𤁀	𤁁	𤁂	𤁃	𤁄	𤁅	𤁆	𤁇	𤁈	𤁉	𤁊	𤁋	𤁌	𤁍	𤁎	𤁏
U+2405x	𤁐	𤁑	𤁒	𤁓	𤁔	𤁕	𤁖	𤁗	𤁘	𤁙	𤁚	𤁛	𤁜	𤁝	𤁞	𤁟
U+2406x	𤁠	𤁡	𤁢	𤁣	𤁤	𤁥	𤁦	𤁧	𤁨	𤁩	𤁪	𤁫	𤁬	𤁭	𤁮	𤁯
U+2407x	𤁰	𤁱	𤁲	𤁳	𤁴	𤁵	𤁶	𤁷	𤁸	𤁹	𤁺	𤁻	𤁼	𤁽	𤁾	𤁿
U+2408x	𤂀	𤂁	𤂂	𤂃	𤂄	𤂅	𤂆	𤂇	𤂈	𤂉	𤂊	𤂋	𤂌	𤂍	𤂎	𤂏
U+2409x	𤂐	𤂑	𤂒	𤂓	𤂔	𤂕	𤂖	𤂗	𤂘	𤂙	𤂚	𤂛	𤂜	𤂝	𤂞	𤂟
U+240Ax	𤂠	𤂡	𤂢	𤂣	𤂤	𤂥	𤂦	𤂧	𤂨	𤂩	𤂪	𤂫	𤂬	𤂭	𤂮	𤂯
U+240Bx	𤂰	𤂱	𤂲	𤂳	𤂴	𤂵	𤂶	𤂷	𤂸	𤂹	𤂺	𤂻	𤂼	𤂽	𤂾	𤂿
U+240Cx	𤃀	𤃁	𤃂	𤃃	𤃄	𤃅	𤃆	𤃇	𤃈	𤃉	𤃊	𤃋	𤃌	𤃍	𤃎	𤃏
U+240Dx	𤃐	𤃑	𤃒	𤃓	𤃔	𤃕	𤃖	𤃗	𤃘	𤃙	𤃚	𤃛	𤃜	𤃝	𤃞	𤃟
U+240Ex	𤃠	𤃡	𤃢	𤃣	𤃤	𤃥	𤃦	𤃧	𤃨	𤃩	𤃪	𤃫	𤃬	𤃭	𤃮	𤃯
U+240Fx	𤃰	𤃱	𤃲	𤃳	𤃴	𤃵	𤃶	𤃷	𤃸	𤃹	𤃺	𤃻	𤃼	𤃽	𤃾	𤃿
U+2410x	𤄀	𤄁	𤄂	𤄃	𤄄	𤄅	𤄆	𤄇	𤄈	𤄉	𤄊	𤄋	𤄌	𤄍	𤄎	𤄏
U+2411x	𤄐	𤄑	𤄒	𤄓	𤄔	𤄕	𤄖	𤄗	𤄘	𤄙	𤄚	𤄛	𤄜	𤄝	𤄞	𤄟
U+2412x	𤄠	𤄡	𤄢	𤄣	𤄤	𤄥	𤄦	𤄧	𤄨	𤄩	𤄪	𤄫	𤄬	𤄭	𤄮	𤄯
U+2413x	𤄰	𤄱	𤄲	𤄳	𤄴	𤄵	𤄶	𤄷	𤄸	𤄹	𤄺	𤄻	𤄼	𤄽	𤄾	𤄿
U+2414x	𤅀	𤅁	𤅂	𤅃	𤅄	𤅅	𤅆	𤅇	𤅈	𤅉	𤅊	𤅋	𤅌	𤅍	𤅎	𤅏
U+2415x	𤅐	𤅑	𤅒	𤅓	𤅔	𤅕	𤅖	𤅗	𤅘	𤅙	𤅚	𤅛	𤅜	𤅝	𤅞	𤅟
U+2416x	𤅠	𤅡	𤅢	𤅣	𤅤	𤅥	𤅦	𤅧	𤅨	𤅩	𤅪	𤅫	𤅬	𤅭	𤅮	𤅯
U+2417x	𤅰	𤅱	𤅲	𤅳	𤅴	𤅵	𤅶	𤅷	𤅸	𤅹	𤅺	𤅻	𤅼	𤅽	𤅾	𤅿
U+2418x	𤆀	𤆁	𤆂	𤆃	𤆄	𤆅	𤆆	𤆇	𤆈	𤆉	𤆊	𤆋	𤆌	𤆍	𤆎	𤆏
U+2419x	𤆐	𤆑	𤆒	𤆓	𤆔	𤆕	𤆖	𤆗	𤆘	𤆙	𤆚	𤆛	𤆜	𤆝	𤆞	𤆟
U+241Ax	𤆠	𤆡	𤆢	𤆣	𤆤	𤆥	𤆦	𤆧	𤆨	𤆩	𤆪	𤆫	𤆬	𤆭	𤆮	𤆯
U+241Bx	𤆰	𤆱	𤆲	𤆳	𤆴	𤆵	𤆶	𤆷	𤆸	𤆹	𤆺	𤆻	𤆼	𤆽	𤆾	𤆿
U+241Cx	𤇀	𤇁	𤇂	𤇃	𤇄	𤇅	𤇆	𤇇	𤇈	𤇉	𤇊	𤇋	𤇌	𤇍	𤇎	𤇏
U+241Dx	𤇐	𤇑	𤇒	𤇓	𤇔	𤇕	𤇖	𤇗	𤇘	𤇙	𤇚	𤇛	𤇜	𤇝	𤇞	𤇟
U+241Ex	𤇠	𤇡	𤇢	𤇣	𤇤	𤇥	𤇦	𤇧	𤇨	𤇩	𤇪	𤇫	𤇬	𤇭	𤇮	𤇯
U+241Fx	𤇰	𤇱	𤇲	𤇳	𤇴	𤇵	𤇶	𤇷	𤇸	𤇹	𤇺	𤇻	𤇼	𤇽	𤇾	𤇿
U+2420x	𤈀	𤈁	𤈂	𤈃	𤈄	𤈅	𤈆	𤈇	𤈈	𤈉	𤈊	𤈋	𤈌	𤈍	𤈎	𤈏
U+2421x	𤈐	𤈑	𤈒	𤈓	𤈔	𤈕	𤈖	𤈗	𤈘	𤈙	𤈚	𤈛	𤈜	𤈝	𤈞	𤈟
U+2422x	𤈠	𤈡	𤈢	𤈣	𤈤	𤈥	𤈦	𤈧	𤈨	𤈩	𤈪	𤈫	𤈬	𤈭	𤈮	𤈯
U+2423x	𤈰	𤈱	𤈲	𤈳	𤈴	𤈵	𤈶	𤈷	𤈸	𤈹	𤈺	𤈻	𤈼	𤈽	𤈾	𤈿
U+2424x	𤉀	𤉁	𤉂	𤉃	𤉄	𤉅	𤉆	𤉇	𤉈	𤉉	𤉊	𤉋	𤉌	𤉍	𤉎	𤉏
U+2425x	𤉐	𤉑	𤉒	𤉓	𤉔	𤉕	𤉖	𤉗	𤉘	𤉙	𤉚	𤉛	𤉜	𤉝	𤉞	𤉟
U+2426x	𤉠	𤉡	𤉢	𤉣	𤉤	𤉥	𤉦	𤉧	𤉨	𤉩	𤉪	𤉫	𤉬	𤉭	𤉮	𤉯
U+2427x	𤉰	𤉱	𤉲	𤉳	𤉴	𤉵	𤉶	𤉷	𤉸	𤉹	𤉺	𤉻	𤉼	𤉽	𤉾	𤉿
U+2428x	𤊀	𤊁	𤊂	𤊃	𤊄	𤊅	𤊆	𤊇	𤊈	𤊉	𤊊	𤊋	𤊌	𤊍	𤊎	𤊏
U+2429x	𤊐	𤊑	𤊒	𤊓	𤊔	𤊕	𤊖	𤊗	𤊘	𤊙	𤊚	𤊛	𤊜	𤊝	𤊞	𤊟
U+242Ax	𤊠	𤊡	𤊢	𤊣	𤊤	𤊥	𤊦	𤊧	𤊨	𤊩	𤊪	𤊫	𤊬	𤊭	𤊮	𤊯
U+242Bx	𤊰	𤊱	𤊲	𤊳	𤊴	𤊵	𤊶	𤊷	𤊸	𤊹	𤊺	𤊻	𤊼	𤊽	𤊾	𤊿
U+242Cx	𤋀	𤋁	𤋂	𤋃	𤋄	𤋅	𤋆	𤋇	𤋈	𤋉	𤋊	𤋋	𤋌	𤋍	𤋎	𤋏
U+242Dx	𤋐	𤋑	𤋒	𤋓	𤋔	𤋕	𤋖	𤋗	𤋘	𤋙	𤋚	𤋛	𤋜	𤋝	𤋞	𤋟
U+242Ex	𤋠	𤋡	𤋢	𤋣	𤋤	𤋥	𤋦	𤋧	𤋨	𤋩	𤋪	𤋫	𤋬	𤋭	𤋮	𤋯
U+242Fx	𤋰	𤋱	𤋲	𤋳	𤋴	𤋵	𤋶	𤋷	𤋸	𤋹	𤋺	𤋻	𤋼	𤋽	𤋾	𤋿
U+2430x	𤌀	𤌁	𤌂	𤌃	𤌄	𤌅	𤌆	𤌇	𤌈	𤌉	𤌊	𤌋	𤌌	𤌍	𤌎	𤌏
U+2431x	𤌐	𤌑	𤌒	𤌓	𤌔	𤌕	𤌖	𤌗	𤌘	𤌙	𤌚	𤌛	𤌜	𤌝	𤌞	𤌟
U+2432x	𤌠	𤌡	𤌢	𤌣	𤌤	𤌥	𤌦	𤌧	𤌨	𤌩	𤌪	𤌫	𤌬	𤌭	𤌮	𤌯
U+2433x	𤌰	𤌱	𤌲	𤌳	𤌴	𤌵	𤌶	𤌷	𤌸	𤌹	𤌺	𤌻	𤌼	𤌽	𤌾	𤌿
U+2434x	𤍀	𤍁	𤍂	𤍃	𤍄	𤍅	𤍆	𤍇	𤍈	𤍉	𤍊	𤍋	𤍌	𤍍	𤍎	𤍏
U+2435x	𤍐	𤍑	𤍒	𤍓	𤍔	𤍕	𤍖	𤍗	𤍘	𤍙	𤍚	𤍛	𤍜	𤍝	𤍞	𤍟
U+2436x	𤍠	𤍡	𤍢	𤍣	𤍤	𤍥	𤍦	𤍧	𤍨	𤍩	𤍪	𤍫	𤍬	𤍭	𤍮	𤍯
U+2437x	𤍰	𤍱	𤍲	𤍳	𤍴	𤍵	𤍶	𤍷	𤍸	𤍹	𤍺	𤍻	𤍼	𤍽	𤍾	𤍿
U+2438x	𤎀	𤎁	𤎂	𤎃	𤎄	𤎅	𤎆	𤎇	𤎈	𤎉	𤎊	𤎋	𤎌	𤎍	𤎎	𤎏
U+2439x	𤎐	𤎑	𤎒	𤎓	𤎔	𤎕	𤎖	𤎗	𤎘	𤎙	𤎚	𤎛	𤎜	𤎝	𤎞	𤎟
U+243Ax	𤎠	𤎡	𤎢	𤎣	𤎤	𤎥	𤎦	𤎧	𤎨	𤎩	𤎪	𤎫	𤎬	𤎭	𤎮	𤎯
U+243Bx	𤎰	𤎱	𤎲	𤎳	𤎴	𤎵	𤎶	𤎷	𤎸	𤎹	𤎺	𤎻	𤎼	𤎽	𤎾	𤎿
U+243Cx	𤏀	𤏁	𤏂	𤏃	𤏄	𤏅	𤏆	𤏇	𤏈	𤏉	𤏊	𤏋	𤏌	𤏍	𤏎	𤏏
U+243Dx	𤏐	𤏑	𤏒	𤏓	𤏔	𤏕	𤏖	𤏗	𤏘	𤏙	𤏚	𤏛	𤏜	𤏝	𤏞	𤏟
U+243Ex	𤏠	𤏡	𤏢	𤏣	𤏤	𤏥	𤏦	𤏧	𤏨	𤏩	𤏪	𤏫	𤏬	𤏭	𤏮	𤏯
U+243Fx	𤏰	𤏱	𤏲	𤏳	𤏴	𤏵	𤏶	𤏷	𤏸	𤏹	𤏺	𤏻	𤏼	𤏽	𤏾	𤏿
U+2440x	𤐀	𤐁	𤐂	𤐃	𤐄	𤐅	𤐆	𤐇	𤐈	𤐉	𤐊	𤐋	𤐌	𤐍	𤐎	𤐏
U+2441x	𤐐	𤐑	𤐒	𤐓	𤐔	𤐕	𤐖	𤐗	𤐘	𤐙	𤐚	𤐛	𤐜	𤐝	𤐞	𤐟
U+2442x	𤐠	𤐡	𤐢	𤐣	𤐤	𤐥	𤐦	𤐧	𤐨	𤐩	𤐪	𤐫	𤐬	𤐭	𤐮	𤐯
U+2443x	𤐰	𤐱	𤐲	𤐳	𤐴	𤐵	𤐶	𤐷	𤐸	𤐹	𤐺	𤐻	𤐼	𤐽	𤐾	𤐿
U+2444x	𤑀	𤑁	𤑂	𤑃	𤑄	𤑅	𤑆	𤑇	𤑈	𤑉	𤑊	𤑋	𤑌	𤑍	𤑎	𤑏
U+2445x	𤑐	𤑑	𤑒	𤑓	𤑔	𤑕	𤑖	𤑗	𤑘	𤑙	𤑚	𤑛	𤑜	𤑝	𤑞	𤑟
U+2446x	𤑠	𤑡	𤑢	𤑣	𤑤	𤑥	𤑦	𤑧	𤑨	𤑩	𤑪	𤑫	𤑬	𤑭	𤑮	𤑯
U+2447x	𤑰	𤑱	𤑲	𤑳	𤑴	𤑵	𤑶	𤑷	𤑸	𤑹	𤑺	𤑻	𤑼	𤑽	𤑾	𤑿
U+2448x	𤒀	𤒁	𤒂	𤒃	𤒄	𤒅	𤒆	𤒇	𤒈	𤒉	𤒊	𤒋	𤒌	𤒍	𤒎	𤒏
U+2449x	𤒐	𤒑	𤒒	𤒓	𤒔	𤒕	𤒖	𤒗	𤒘	𤒙	𤒚	𤒛	𤒜	𤒝	𤒞	𤒟
U+244Ax	𤒠	𤒡	𤒢	𤒣	𤒤	𤒥	𤒦	𤒧	𤒨	𤒩	𤒪	𤒫	𤒬	𤒭	𤒮	𤒯
U+244Bx	𤒰	𤒱	𤒲	𤒳	𤒴	𤒵	𤒶	𤒷	𤒸	𤒹	𤒺	𤒻	𤒼	𤒽	𤒾	𤒿
U+244Cx	𤓀	𤓁	𤓂	𤓃	𤓄	𤓅	𤓆	𤓇	𤓈	𤓉	𤓊	𤓋	𤓌	𤓍	𤓎	𤓏
U+244Dx	𤓐	𤓑	𤓒	𤓓	𤓔	𤓕	𤓖	𤓗	𤓘	𤓙	𤓚	𤓛	𤓜	𤓝	𤓞	𤓟
U+244Ex	𤓠	𤓡	𤓢	𤓣	𤓤	𤓥	𤓦	𤓧	𤓨	𤓩	𤓪	𤓫	𤓬	𤓭	𤓮	𤓯
U+244Fx	𤓰	𤓱	𤓲	𤓳	𤓴	𤓵	𤓶	𤓷	𤓸	𤓹	𤓺	𤓻	𤓼	𤓽	𤓾	𤓿
U+2450x	𤔀	𤔁	𤔂	𤔃	𤔄	𤔅	𤔆	𤔇	𤔈	𤔉	𤔊	𤔋	𤔌	𤔍	𤔎	𤔏
U+2451x	𤔐	𤔑	𤔒	𤔓	𤔔	𤔕	𤔖	𤔗	𤔘	𤔙	𤔚	𤔛	𤔜	𤔝	𤔞	𤔟
U+2452x	𤔠	𤔡	𤔢	𤔣	𤔤	𤔥	𤔦	𤔧	𤔨	𤔩	𤔪	𤔫	𤔬	𤔭	𤔮	𤔯
U+2453x	𤔰	𤔱	𤔲	𤔳	𤔴	𤔵	𤔶	𤔷	𤔸	𤔹	𤔺	𤔻	𤔼	𤔽	𤔾	𤔿
U+2454x	𤕀	𤕁	𤕂	𤕃	𤕄	𤕅	𤕆	𤕇	𤕈	𤕉	𤕊	𤕋	𤕌	𤕍	𤕎	𤕏
U+2455x	𤕐	𤕑	𤕒	𤕓	𤕔	𤕕	𤕖	𤕗	𤕘	𤕙	𤕚	𤕛	𤕜	𤕝	𤕞	𤕟
U+2456x	𤕠	𤕡	𤕢	𤕣	𤕤	𤕥	𤕦	𤕧	𤕨	𤕩	𤕪	𤕫	𤕬	𤕭	𤕮	𤕯
U+2457x	𤕰	𤕱	𤕲	𤕳	𤕴	𤕵	𤕶	𤕷	𤕸	𤕹	𤕺	𤕻	𤕼	𤕽	𤕾	𤕿
U+2458x	𤖀	𤖁	𤖂	𤖃	𤖄	𤖅	𤖆	𤖇	𤖈	𤖉	𤖊	𤖋	𤖌	𤖍	𤖎	𤖏
U+2459x	𤖐	𤖑	𤖒	𤖓	𤖔	𤖕	𤖖	𤖗	𤖘	𤖙	𤖚	𤖛	𤖜	𤖝	𤖞	𤖟
U+245Ax	𤖠	𤖡	𤖢	𤖣	𤖤	𤖥	𤖦	𤖧	𤖨	𤖩	𤖪	𤖫	𤖬	𤖭	𤖮	𤖯
U+245Bx	𤖰	𤖱	𤖲	𤖳	𤖴	𤖵	𤖶	𤖷	𤖸	𤖹	𤖺	𤖻	𤖼	𤖽	𤖾	𤖿
U+245Cx	𤗀	𤗁	𤗂	𤗃	𤗄	𤗅	𤗆	𤗇	𤗈	𤗉	𤗊	𤗋	𤗌	𤗍	𤗎	𤗏
U+245Dx	𤗐	𤗑	𤗒	𤗓	𤗔	𤗕	𤗖	𤗗	𤗘	𤗙	𤗚	𤗛	𤗜	𤗝	𤗞	𤗟
U+245Ex	𤗠	𤗡	𤗢	𤗣	𤗤	𤗥	𤗦	𤗧	𤗨	𤗩	𤗪	𤗫	𤗬	𤗭	𤗮	𤗯
U+245Fx	𤗰	𤗱	𤗲	𤗳	𤗴	𤗵	𤗶	𤗷	𤗸	𤗹	𤗺	𤗻	𤗼	𤗽	𤗾	𤗿
U+2460x	𤘀	𤘁	𤘂	𤘃	𤘄	𤘅	𤘆	𤘇	𤘈	𤘉	𤘊	𤘋	𤘌	𤘍	𤘎	𤘏
U+2461x	𤘐	𤘑	𤘒	𤘓	𤘔	𤘕	𤘖	𤘗	𤘘	𤘙	𤘚	𤘛	𤘜	𤘝	𤘞	𤘟
U+2462x	𤘠	𤘡	𤘢	𤘣	𤘤	𤘥	𤘦	𤘧	𤘨	𤘩	𤘪	𤘫	𤘬	𤘭	𤘮	𤘯
U+2463x	𤘰	𤘱	𤘲	𤘳	𤘴	𤘵	𤘶	𤘷	𤘸	𤘹	𤘺	𤘻	𤘼	𤘽	𤘾	𤘿
U+2464x	𤙀	𤙁	𤙂	𤙃	𤙄	𤙅	𤙆	𤙇	𤙈	𤙉	𤙊	𤙋	𤙌	𤙍	𤙎	𤙏
U+2465x	𤙐	𤙑	𤙒	𤙓	𤙔	𤙕	𤙖	𤙗	𤙘	𤙙	𤙚	𤙛	𤙜	𤙝	𤙞	𤙟
U+2466x	𤙠	𤙡	𤙢	𤙣	𤙤	𤙥	𤙦	𤙧	𤙨	𤙩	𤙪	𤙫	𤙬	𤙭	𤙮	𤙯
U+2467x	𤙰	𤙱	𤙲	𤙳	𤙴	𤙵	𤙶	𤙷	𤙸	𤙹	𤙺	𤙻	𤙼	𤙽	𤙾	𤙿
U+2468x	𤚀	𤚁	𤚂	𤚃	𤚄	𤚅	𤚆	𤚇	𤚈	𤚉	𤚊	𤚋	𤚌	𤚍	𤚎	𤚏
U+2469x	𤚐	𤚑	𤚒	𤚓	𤚔	𤚕	𤚖	𤚗	𤚘	𤚙	𤚚	𤚛	𤚜	𤚝	𤚞	𤚟
U+246Ax	𤚠	𤚡	𤚢	𤚣	𤚤	𤚥	𤚦	𤚧	𤚨	𤚩	𤚪	𤚫	𤚬	𤚭	𤚮	𤚯
U+246Bx	𤚰	𤚱	𤚲	𤚳	𤚴	𤚵	𤚶	𤚷	𤚸	𤚹	𤚺	𤚻	𤚼	𤚽	𤚾	𤚿
U+246Cx	𤛀	𤛁	𤛂	𤛃	𤛄	𤛅	𤛆	𤛇	𤛈	𤛉	𤛊	𤛋	𤛌	𤛍	𤛎	𤛏
U+246Dx	𤛐	𤛑	𤛒	𤛓	𤛔	𤛕	𤛖	𤛗	𤛘	𤛙	𤛚	𤛛	𤛜	𤛝	𤛞	𤛟
U+246Ex	𤛠	𤛡	𤛢	𤛣	𤛤	𤛥	𤛦	𤛧	𤛨	𤛩	𤛪	𤛫	𤛬	𤛭	𤛮	𤛯
U+246Fx	𤛰	𤛱	𤛲	𤛳	𤛴	𤛵	𤛶	𤛷	𤛸	𤛹	𤛺	𤛻	𤛼	𤛽	𤛾	𤛿
U+2470x	𤜀	𤜁	𤜂	𤜃	𤜄	𤜅	𤜆	𤜇	𤜈	𤜉	𤜊	𤜋	𤜌	𤜍	𤜎	𤜏
U+2471x	𤜐	𤜑	𤜒	𤜓	𤜔	𤜕	𤜖	𤜗	𤜘	𤜙	𤜚	𤜛	𤜜	𤜝	𤜞	𤜟
U+2472x	𤜠	𤜡	𤜢	𤜣	𤜤	𤜥	𤜦	𤜧	𤜨	𤜩	𤜪	𤜫	𤜬	𤜭	𤜮	𤜯
U+2473x	𤜰	𤜱	𤜲	𤜳	𤜴	𤜵	𤜶	𤜷	𤜸	𤜹	𤜺	𤜻	𤜼	𤜽	𤜾	𤜿
U+2474x	𤝀	𤝁	𤝂	𤝃	𤝄	𤝅	𤝆	𤝇	𤝈	𤝉	𤝊	𤝋	𤝌	𤝍	𤝎	𤝏
U+2475x	𤝐	𤝑	𤝒	𤝓	𤝔	𤝕	𤝖	𤝗	𤝘	𤝙	𤝚	𤝛	𤝜	𤝝	𤝞	𤝟
U+2476x	𤝠	𤝡	𤝢	𤝣	𤝤	𤝥	𤝦	𤝧	𤝨	𤝩	𤝪	𤝫	𤝬	𤝭	𤝮	𤝯
U+2477x	𤝰	𤝱	𤝲	𤝳	𤝴	𤝵	𤝶	𤝷	𤝸	𤝹	𤝺	𤝻	𤝼	𤝽	𤝾	𤝿
U+2478x	𤞀	𤞁	𤞂	𤞃	𤞄	𤞅	𤞆	𤞇	𤞈	𤞉	𤞊	𤞋	𤞌	𤞍	𤞎	𤞏
U+2479x	𤞐	𤞑	𤞒	𤞓	𤞔	𤞕	𤞖	𤞗	𤞘	𤞙	𤞚	𤞛	𤞜	𤞝	𤞞	𤞟
U+247Ax	𤞠	𤞡	𤞢	𤞣	𤞤	𤞥	𤞦	𤞧	𤞨	𤞩	𤞪	𤞫	𤞬	𤞭	𤞮	𤞯
U+247Bx	𤞰	𤞱	𤞲	𤞳	𤞴	𤞵	𤞶	𤞷	𤞸	𤞹	𤞺	𤞻	𤞼	𤞽	𤞾	𤞿
U+247Cx	𤟀	𤟁	𤟂	𤟃	𤟄	𤟅	𤟆	𤟇	𤟈	𤟉	𤟊	𤟋	𤟌	𤟍	𤟎	𤟏
U+247Dx	𤟐	𤟑	𤟒	𤟓	𤟔	𤟕	𤟖	𤟗	𤟘	𤟙	𤟚	𤟛	𤟜	𤟝	𤟞	𤟟
U+247Ex	𤟠	𤟡	𤟢	𤟣	𤟤	𤟥	𤟦	𤟧	𤟨	𤟩	𤟪	𤟫	𤟬	𤟭	𤟮	𤟯
U+247Fx	𤟰	𤟱	𤟲	𤟳	𤟴	𤟵	𤟶	𤟷	𤟸	𤟹	𤟺	𤟻	𤟼	𤟽	𤟾	𤟿
U+2480x	𤠀	𤠁	𤠂	𤠃	𤠄	𤠅	𤠆	𤠇	𤠈	𤠉	𤠊	𤠋	𤠌	𤠍	𤠎	𤠏
U+2481x	𤠐	𤠑	𤠒	𤠓	𤠔	𤠕	𤠖	𤠗	𤠘	𤠙	𤠚	𤠛	𤠜	𤠝	𤠞	𤠟
U+2482x	𤠠	𤠡	𤠢	𤠣	𤠤	𤠥	𤠦	𤠧	𤠨	𤠩	𤠪	𤠫	𤠬	𤠭	𤠮	𤠯
U+2483x	𤠰	𤠱	𤠲	𤠳	𤠴	𤠵	𤠶	𤠷	𤠸	𤠹	𤠺	𤠻	𤠼	𤠽	𤠾	𤠿
U+2484x	𤡀	𤡁	𤡂	𤡃	𤡄	𤡅	𤡆	𤡇	𤡈	𤡉	𤡊	𤡋	𤡌	𤡍	𤡎	𤡏
U+2485x	𤡐	𤡑	𤡒	𤡓	𤡔	𤡕	𤡖	𤡗	𤡘	𤡙	𤡚	𤡛	𤡜	𤡝	𤡞	𤡟
U+2486x	𤡠	𤡡	𤡢	𤡣	𤡤	𤡥	𤡦	𤡧	𤡨	𤡩	𤡪	𤡫	𤡬	𤡭	𤡮	𤡯
U+2487x	𤡰	𤡱	𤡲	𤡳	𤡴	𤡵	𤡶	𤡷	𤡸	𤡹	𤡺	𤡻	𤡼	𤡽	𤡾	𤡿
U+2488x	𤢀	𤢁	𤢂	𤢃	𤢄	𤢅	𤢆	𤢇	𤢈	𤢉	𤢊	𤢋	𤢌	𤢍	𤢎	𤢏
U+2489x	𤢐	𤢑	𤢒	𤢓	𤢔	𤢕	𤢖	𤢗	𤢘	𤢙	𤢚	𤢛	𤢜	𤢝	𤢞	𤢟
U+248Ax	𤢠	𤢡	𤢢	𤢣	𤢤	𤢥	𤢦	𤢧	𤢨	𤢩	𤢪	𤢫	𤢬	𤢭	𤢮	𤢯
U+248Bx	𤢰	𤢱	𤢲	𤢳	𤢴	𤢵	𤢶	𤢷	𤢸	𤢹	𤢺	𤢻	𤢼	𤢽	𤢾	𤢿
U+248Cx	𤣀	𤣁	𤣂	𤣃	𤣄	𤣅	𤣆	𤣇	𤣈	𤣉	𤣊	𤣋	𤣌	𤣍	𤣎	𤣏
U+248Dx	𤣐	𤣑	𤣒	𤣓	𤣔	𤣕	𤣖	𤣗	𤣘	𤣙	𤣚	𤣛	𤣜	𤣝	𤣞	𤣟
U+248Ex	𤣠	𤣡	𤣢	𤣣	𤣤	𤣥	𤣦	𤣧	𤣨	𤣩	𤣪	𤣫	𤣬	𤣭	𤣮	𤣯
U+248Fx	𤣰	𤣱	𤣲	𤣳	𤣴	𤣵	𤣶	𤣷	𤣸	𤣹	𤣺	𤣻	𤣼	𤣽	𤣾	𤣿
U+2490x	𤤀	𤤁	𤤂	𤤃	𤤄	𤤅	𤤆	𤤇	𤤈	𤤉	𤤊	𤤋	𤤌	𤤍	𤤎	𤤏
U+2491x	𤤐	𤤑	𤤒	𤤓	𤤔	𤤕	𤤖	𤤗	𤤘	𤤙	𤤚	𤤛	𤤜	𤤝	𤤞	𤤟
U+2492x	𤤠	𤤡	𤤢	𤤣	𤤤	𤤥	𤤦	𤤧	𤤨	𤤩	𤤪	𤤫	𤤬	𤤭	𤤮	𤤯
U+2493x	𤤰	𤤱	𤤲	𤤳	𤤴	𤤵	𤤶	𤤷	𤤸	𤤹	𤤺	𤤻	𤤼	𤤽	𤤾	𤤿
U+2494x	𤥀	𤥁	𤥂	𤥃	𤥄	𤥅	𤥆	𤥇	𤥈	𤥉	𤥊	𤥋	𤥌	𤥍	𤥎	𤥏
U+2495x	𤥐	𤥑	𤥒	𤥓	𤥔	𤥕	𤥖	𤥗	𤥘	𤥙	𤥚	𤥛	𤥜	𤥝	𤥞	𤥟
U+2496x	𤥠	𤥡	𤥢	𤥣	𤥤	𤥥	𤥦	𤥧	𤥨	𤥩	𤥪	𤥫	𤥬	𤥭	𤥮	𤥯
U+2497x	𤥰	𤥱	𤥲	𤥳	𤥴	𤥵	𤥶	𤥷	𤥸	𤥹	𤥺	𤥻	𤥼	𤥽	𤥾	𤥿
U+2498x	𤦀	𤦁	𤦂	𤦃	𤦄	𤦅	𤦆	𤦇	𤦈	𤦉	𤦊	𤦋	𤦌	𤦍	𤦎	𤦏
U+2499x	𤦐	𤦑	𤦒	𤦓	𤦔	𤦕	𤦖	𤦗	𤦘	𤦙	𤦚	𤦛	𤦜	𤦝	𤦞	𤦟
U+249Ax	𤦠	𤦡	𤦢	𤦣	𤦤	𤦥	𤦦	𤦧	𤦨	𤦩	𤦪	𤦫	𤦬	𤦭	𤦮	𤦯
U+249Bx	𤦰	𤦱	𤦲	𤦳	𤦴	𤦵	𤦶	𤦷	𤦸	𤦹	𤦺	𤦻	𤦼	𤦽	𤦾	𤦿
U+249Cx	𤧀	𤧁	𤧂	𤧃	𤧄	𤧅	𤧆	𤧇	𤧈	𤧉	𤧊	𤧋	𤧌	𤧍	𤧎	𤧏
U+249Dx	𤧐	𤧑	𤧒	𤧓	𤧔	𤧕	𤧖	𤧗	𤧘	𤧙	𤧚	𤧛	𤧜	𤧝	𤧞	𤧟
U+249Ex	𤧠	𤧡	𤧢	𤧣	𤧤	𤧥	𤧦	𤧧	𤧨	𤧩	𤧪	𤧫	𤧬	𤧭	𤧮	𤧯
U+249Fx	𤧰	𤧱	𤧲	𤧳	𤧴	𤧵	𤧶	𤧷	𤧸	𤧹	𤧺	𤧻	𤧼	𤧽	𤧾	𤧿
U+24A0x	𤨀	𤨁	𤨂	𤨃	𤨄	𤨅	𤨆	𤨇	𤨈	𤨉	𤨊	𤨋	𤨌	𤨍	𤨎	𤨏
U+24A1x	𤨐	𤨑	𤨒	𤨓	𤨔	𤨕	𤨖	𤨗	𤨘	𤨙	𤨚	𤨛	𤨜	𤨝	𤨞	𤨟
U+24A2x	𤨠	𤨡	𤨢	𤨣	𤨤	𤨥	𤨦	𤨧	𤨨	𤨩	𤨪	𤨫	𤨬	𤨭	𤨮	𤨯
U+24A3x	𤨰	𤨱	𤨲	𤨳	𤨴	𤨵	𤨶	𤨷	𤨸	𤨹	𤨺	𤨻	𤨼	𤨽	𤨾	𤨿
U+24A4x	𤩀	𤩁	𤩂	𤩃	𤩄	𤩅	𤩆	𤩇	𤩈	𤩉	𤩊	𤩋	𤩌	𤩍	𤩎	𤩏
U+24A5x	𤩐	𤩑	𤩒	𤩓	𤩔	𤩕	𤩖	𤩗	𤩘	𤩙	𤩚	𤩛	𤩜	𤩝	𤩞	𤩟
U+24A6x	𤩠	𤩡	𤩢	𤩣	𤩤	𤩥	𤩦	𤩧	𤩨	𤩩	𤩪	𤩫	𤩬	𤩭	𤩮	𤩯
U+24A7x	𤩰	𤩱	𤩲	𤩳	𤩴	𤩵	𤩶	𤩷	𤩸	𤩹	𤩺	𤩻	𤩼	𤩽	𤩾	𤩿
U+24A8x	𤪀	𤪁	𤪂	𤪃	𤪄	𤪅	𤪆	𤪇	𤪈	𤪉	𤪊	𤪋	𤪌	𤪍	𤪎	𤪏
U+24A9x	𤪐	𤪑	𤪒	𤪓	𤪔	𤪕	𤪖	𤪗	𤪘	𤪙	𤪚	𤪛	𤪜	𤪝	𤪞	𤪟
U+24AAx	𤪠	𤪡	𤪢	𤪣	𤪤	𤪥	𤪦	𤪧	𤪨	𤪩	𤪪	𤪫	𤪬	𤪭	𤪮	𤪯
U+24ABx	𤪰	𤪱	𤪲	𤪳	𤪴	𤪵	𤪶	𤪷	𤪸	𤪹	𤪺	𤪻	𤪼	𤪽	𤪾	𤪿
U+24ACx	𤫀	𤫁	𤫂	𤫃	𤫄	𤫅	𤫆	𤫇	𤫈	𤫉	𤫊	𤫋	𤫌	𤫍	𤫎	𤫏
U+24ADx	𤫐	𤫑	𤫒	𤫓	𤫔	𤫕	𤫖	𤫗	𤫘	𤫙	𤫚	𤫛	𤫜	𤫝	𤫞	𤫟
U+24AEx	𤫠	𤫡	𤫢	𤫣	𤫤	𤫥	𤫦	𤫧	𤫨	𤫩	𤫪	𤫫	𤫬	𤫭	𤫮	𤫯
U+24AFx	𤫰	𤫱	𤫲	𤫳	𤫴	𤫵	𤫶	𤫷	𤫸	𤫹	𤫺	𤫻	𤫼	𤫽	𤫾	𤫿
U+24B0x	𤬀	𤬁	𤬂	𤬃	𤬄	𤬅	𤬆	𤬇	𤬈	𤬉	𤬊	𤬋	𤬌	𤬍	𤬎	𤬏
U+24B1x	𤬐	𤬑	𤬒	𤬓	𤬔	𤬕	𤬖	𤬗	𤬘	𤬙	𤬚	𤬛	𤬜	𤬝	𤬞	𤬟
U+24B2x	𤬠	𤬡	𤬢	𤬣	𤬤	𤬥	𤬦	𤬧	𤬨	𤬩	𤬪	𤬫	𤬬	𤬭	𤬮	𤬯
U+24B3x	𤬰	𤬱	𤬲	𤬳	𤬴	𤬵	𤬶	𤬷	𤬸	𤬹	𤬺	𤬻	𤬼	𤬽	𤬾	𤬿
U+24B4x	𤭀	𤭁	𤭂	𤭃	𤭄	𤭅	𤭆	𤭇	𤭈	𤭉	𤭊	𤭋	𤭌	𤭍	𤭎	𤭏
U+24B5x	𤭐	𤭑	𤭒	𤭓	𤭔	𤭕	𤭖	𤭗	𤭘	𤭙	𤭚	𤭛	𤭜	𤭝	𤭞	𤭟
U+24B6x	𤭠	𤭡	𤭢	𤭣	𤭤	𤭥	𤭦	𤭧	𤭨	𤭩	𤭪	𤭫	𤭬	𤭭	𤭮	𤭯
U+24B7x	𤭰	𤭱	𤭲	𤭳	𤭴	𤭵	𤭶	𤭷	𤭸	𤭹	𤭺	𤭻	𤭼	𤭽	𤭾	𤭿
U+24B8x	𤮀	𤮁	𤮂	𤮃	𤮄	𤮅	𤮆	𤮇	𤮈	𤮉	𤮊	𤮋	𤮌	𤮍	𤮎	𤮏
U+24B9x	𤮐	𤮑	𤮒	𤮓	𤮔	𤮕	𤮖	𤮗	𤮘	𤮙	𤮚	𤮛	𤮜	𤮝	𤮞	𤮟
U+24BAx	𤮠	𤮡	𤮢	𤮣	𤮤	𤮥	𤮦	𤮧	𤮨	𤮩	𤮪	𤮫	𤮬	𤮭	𤮮	𤮯
U+24BBx	𤮰	𤮱	𤮲	𤮳	𤮴	𤮵	𤮶	𤮷	𤮸	𤮹	𤮺	𤮻	𤮼	𤮽	𤮾	𤮿
U+24BCx	𤯀	𤯁	𤯂	𤯃	𤯄	𤯅	𤯆	𤯇	𤯈	𤯉	𤯊	𤯋	𤯌	𤯍	𤯎	𤯏
U+24BDx	𤯐	𤯑	𤯒	𤯓	𤯔	𤯕	𤯖	𤯗	𤯘	𤯙	𤯚	𤯛	𤯜	𤯝	𤯞	𤯟
U+24BEx	𤯠	𤯡	𤯢	𤯣	𤯤	𤯥	𤯦	𤯧	𤯨	𤯩	𤯪	𤯫	𤯬	𤯭	𤯮	𤯯
U+24BFx	𤯰	𤯱	𤯲	𤯳	𤯴	𤯵	𤯶	𤯷	𤯸	𤯹	𤯺	𤯻	𤯼	𤯽	𤯾	𤯿
U+24C0x	𤰀	𤰁	𤰂	𤰃	𤰄	𤰅	𤰆	𤰇	𤰈	𤰉	𤰊	𤰋	𤰌	𤰍	𤰎	𤰏
U+24C1x	𤰐	𤰑	𤰒	𤰓	𤰔	𤰕	𤰖	𤰗	𤰘	𤰙	𤰚	𤰛	𤰜	𤰝	𤰞	𤰟
U+24C2x	𤰠	𤰡	𤰢	𤰣	𤰤	𤰥	𤰦	𤰧	𤰨	𤰩	𤰪	𤰫	𤰬	𤰭	𤰮	𤰯
U+24C3x	𤰰	𤰱	𤰲	𤰳	𤰴	𤰵	𤰶	𤰷	𤰸	𤰹	𤰺	𤰻	𤰼	𤰽	𤰾	𤰿
U+24C4x	𤱀	𤱁	𤱂	𤱃	𤱄	𤱅	𤱆	𤱇	𤱈	𤱉	𤱊	𤱋	𤱌	𤱍	𤱎	𤱏
U+24C5x	𤱐	𤱑	𤱒	𤱓	𤱔	𤱕	𤱖	𤱗	𤱘	𤱙	𤱚	𤱛	𤱜	𤱝	𤱞	𤱟
U+24C6x	𤱠	𤱡	𤱢	𤱣	𤱤	𤱥	𤱦	𤱧	𤱨	𤱩	𤱪	𤱫	𤱬	𤱭	𤱮	𤱯
U+24C7x	𤱰	𤱱	𤱲	𤱳	𤱴	𤱵	𤱶	𤱷	𤱸	𤱹	𤱺	𤱻	𤱼	𤱽	𤱾	𤱿
U+24C8x	𤲀	𤲁	𤲂	𤲃	𤲄	𤲅	𤲆	𤲇	𤲈	𤲉	𤲊	𤲋	𤲌	𤲍	𤲎	𤲏
U+24C9x	𤲐	𤲑	𤲒	𤲓	𤲔	𤲕	𤲖	𤲗	𤲘	𤲙	𤲚	𤲛	𤲜	𤲝	𤲞	𤲟
U+24CAx	𤲠	𤲡	𤲢	𤲣	𤲤	𤲥	𤲦	𤲧	𤲨	𤲩	𤲪	𤲫	𤲬	𤲭	𤲮	𤲯
U+24CBx	𤲰	𤲱	𤲲	𤲳	𤲴	𤲵	𤲶	𤲷	𤲸	𤲹	𤲺	𤲻	𤲼	𤲽	𤲾	𤲿
U+24CCx	𤳀	𤳁	𤳂	𤳃	𤳄	𤳅	𤳆	𤳇	𤳈	𤳉	𤳊	𤳋	𤳌	𤳍	𤳎	𤳏
U+24CDx	𤳐	𤳑	𤳒	𤳓	𤳔	𤳕	𤳖	𤳗	𤳘	𤳙	𤳚	𤳛	𤳜	𤳝	𤳞	𤳟
U+24CEx	𤳠	𤳡	𤳢	𤳣	𤳤	𤳥	𤳦	𤳧	𤳨	𤳩	𤳪	𤳫	𤳬	𤳭	𤳮	𤳯
U+24CFx	𤳰	𤳱	𤳲	𤳳	𤳴	𤳵	𤳶	𤳷	𤳸	𤳹	𤳺	𤳻	𤳼	𤳽	𤳾	𤳿
U+24D0x	𤴀	𤴁	𤴂	𤴃	𤴄	𤴅	𤴆	𤴇	𤴈	𤴉	𤴊	𤴋	𤴌	𤴍	𤴎	𤴏
U+24D1x	𤴐	𤴑	𤴒	𤴓	𤴔	𤴕	𤴖	𤴗	𤴘	𤴙	𤴚	𤴛	𤴜	𤴝	𤴞	𤴟
U+24D2x	𤴠	𤴡	𤴢	𤴣	𤴤	𤴥	𤴦	𤴧	𤴨	𤴩	𤴪	𤴫	𤴬	𤴭	𤴮	𤴯
U+24D3x	𤴰	𤴱	𤴲	𤴳	𤴴	𤴵	𤴶	𤴷	𤴸	𤴹	𤴺	𤴻	𤴼	𤴽	𤴾	𤴿
U+24D4x	𤵀	𤵁	𤵂	𤵃	𤵄	𤵅	𤵆	𤵇	𤵈	𤵉	𤵊	𤵋	𤵌	𤵍	𤵎	𤵏
U+24D5x	𤵐	𤵑	𤵒	𤵓	𤵔	𤵕	𤵖	𤵗	𤵘	𤵙	𤵚	𤵛	𤵜	𤵝	𤵞	𤵟
U+24D6x	𤵠	𤵡	𤵢	𤵣	𤵤	𤵥	𤵦	𤵧	𤵨	𤵩	𤵪	𤵫	𤵬	𤵭	𤵮	𤵯
U+24D7x	𤵰	𤵱	𤵲	𤵳	𤵴	𤵵	𤵶	𤵷	𤵸	𤵹	𤵺	𤵻	𤵼	𤵽	𤵾	𤵿
U+24D8x	𤶀	𤶁	𤶂	𤶃	𤶄	𤶅	𤶆	𤶇	𤶈	𤶉	𤶊	𤶋	𤶌	𤶍	𤶎	𤶏
U+24D9x	𤶐	𤶑	𤶒	𤶓	𤶔	𤶕	𤶖	𤶗	𤶘	𤶙	𤶚	𤶛	𤶜	𤶝	𤶞	𤶟
U+24DAx	𤶠	𤶡	𤶢	𤶣	𤶤	𤶥	𤶦	𤶧	𤶨	𤶩	𤶪	𤶫	𤶬	𤶭	𤶮	𤶯
U+24DBx	𤶰	𤶱	𤶲	𤶳	𤶴	𤶵	𤶶	𤶷	𤶸	𤶹	𤶺	𤶻	𤶼	𤶽	𤶾	𤶿
U+24DCx	𤷀	𤷁	𤷂	𤷃	𤷄	𤷅	𤷆	𤷇	𤷈	𤷉	𤷊	𤷋	𤷌	𤷍	𤷎	𤷏
U+24DDx	𤷐	𤷑	𤷒	𤷓	𤷔	𤷕	𤷖	𤷗	𤷘	𤷙	𤷚	𤷛	𤷜	𤷝	𤷞	𤷟
U+24DEx	𤷠	𤷡	𤷢	𤷣	𤷤	𤷥	𤷦	𤷧	𤷨	𤷩	𤷪	𤷫	𤷬	𤷭	𤷮	𤷯
U+24DFx	𤷰	𤷱	𤷲	𤷳	𤷴	𤷵	𤷶	𤷷	𤷸	𤷹	𤷺	𤷻	𤷼	𤷽	𤷾	𤷿
U+24E0x	𤸀	𤸁	𤸂	𤸃	𤸄	𤸅	𤸆	𤸇	𤸈	𤸉	𤸊	𤸋	𤸌	𤸍	𤸎	𤸏
U+24E1x	𤸐	𤸑	𤸒	𤸓	𤸔	𤸕	𤸖	𤸗	𤸘	𤸙	𤸚	𤸛	𤸜	𤸝	𤸞	𤸟
U+24E2x	𤸠	𤸡	𤸢	𤸣	𤸤	𤸥	𤸦	𤸧	𤸨	𤸩	𤸪	𤸫	𤸬	𤸭	𤸮	𤸯
U+24E3x	𤸰	𤸱	𤸲	𤸳	𤸴	𤸵	𤸶	𤸷	𤸸	𤸹	𤸺	𤸻	𤸼	𤸽	𤸾	𤸿
U+24E4x	𤹀	𤹁	𤹂	𤹃	𤹄	𤹅	𤹆	𤹇	𤹈	𤹉	𤹊	𤹋	𤹌	𤹍	𤹎	𤹏
U+24E5x	𤹐	𤹑	𤹒	𤹓	𤹔	𤹕	𤹖	𤹗	𤹘	𤹙	𤹚	𤹛	𤹜	𤹝	𤹞	𤹟
U+24E6x	𤹠	𤹡	𤹢	𤹣	𤹤	𤹥	𤹦	𤹧	𤹨	𤹩	𤹪	𤹫	𤹬	𤹭	𤹮	𤹯
U+24E7x	𤹰	𤹱	𤹲	𤹳	𤹴	𤹵	𤹶	𤹷	𤹸	𤹹	𤹺	𤹻	𤹼	𤹽	𤹾	𤹿
U+24E8x	𤺀	𤺁	𤺂	𤺃	𤺄	𤺅	𤺆	𤺇	𤺈	𤺉	𤺊	𤺋	𤺌	𤺍	𤺎	𤺏
U+24E9x	𤺐	𤺑	𤺒	𤺓	𤺔	𤺕	𤺖	𤺗	𤺘	𤺙	𤺚	𤺛	𤺜	𤺝	𤺞	𤺟
U+24EAx	𤺠	𤺡	𤺢	𤺣	𤺤	𤺥	𤺦	𤺧	𤺨	𤺩	𤺪	𤺫	𤺬	𤺭	𤺮	𤺯
U+24EBx	𤺰	𤺱	𤺲	𤺳	𤺴	𤺵	𤺶	𤺷	𤺸	𤺹	𤺺	𤺻	𤺼	𤺽	𤺾	𤺿
U+24ECx	𤻀	𤻁	𤻂	𤻃	𤻄	𤻅	𤻆	𤻇	𤻈	𤻉	𤻊	𤻋	𤻌	𤻍	𤻎	𤻏
U+24EDx	𤻐	𤻑	𤻒	𤻓	𤻔	𤻕	𤻖	𤻗	𤻘	𤻙	𤻚	𤻛	𤻜	𤻝	𤻞	𤻟
U+24EEx	𤻠	𤻡	𤻢	𤻣	𤻤	𤻥	𤻦	𤻧	𤻨	𤻩	𤻪	𤻫	𤻬	𤻭	𤻮	𤻯
U+24EFx	𤻰	𤻱	𤻲	𤻳	𤻴	𤻵	𤻶	𤻷	𤻸	𤻹	𤻺	𤻻	𤻼	𤻽	𤻾	𤻿
U+24F0x	𤼀	𤼁	𤼂	𤼃	𤼄	𤼅	𤼆	𤼇	𤼈	𤼉	𤼊	𤼋	𤼌	𤼍	𤼎	𤼏
U+24F1x	𤼐	𤼑	𤼒	𤼓	𤼔	𤼕	𤼖	𤼗	𤼘	𤼙	𤼚	𤼛	𤼜	𤼝	𤼞	𤼟
U+24F2x	𤼠	𤼡	𤼢	𤼣	𤼤	𤼥	𤼦	𤼧	𤼨	𤼩	𤼪	𤼫	𤼬	𤼭	𤼮	𤼯
U+24F3x	𤼰	𤼱	𤼲	𤼳	𤼴	𤼵	𤼶	𤼷	𤼸	𤼹	𤼺	𤼻	𤼼	𤼽	𤼾	𤼿
U+24F4x	𤽀	𤽁	𤽂	𤽃	𤽄	𤽅	𤽆	𤽇	𤽈	𤽉	𤽊	𤽋	𤽌	𤽍	𤽎	𤽏
U+24F5x	𤽐	𤽑	𤽒	𤽓	𤽔	𤽕	𤽖	𤽗	𤽘	𤽙	𤽚	𤽛	𤽜	𤽝	𤽞	𤽟
U+24F6x	𤽠	𤽡	𤽢	𤽣	𤽤	𤽥	𤽦	𤽧	𤽨	𤽩	𤽪	𤽫	𤽬	𤽭	𤽮	𤽯
U+24F7x	𤽰	𤽱	𤽲	𤽳	𤽴	𤽵	𤽶	𤽷	𤽸	𤽹	𤽺	𤽻	𤽼	𤽽	𤽾	𤽿
U+24F8x	𤾀	𤾁	𤾂	𤾃	𤾄	𤾅	𤾆	𤾇	𤾈	𤾉	𤾊	𤾋	𤾌	𤾍	𤾎	𤾏
U+24F9x	𤾐	𤾑	𤾒	𤾓	𤾔	𤾕	𤾖	𤾗	𤾘	𤾙	𤾚	𤾛	𤾜	𤾝	𤾞	𤾟
U+24FAx	𤾠	𤾡	𤾢	𤾣	𤾤	𤾥	𤾦	𤾧	𤾨	𤾩	𤾪	𤾫	𤾬	𤾭	𤾮	𤾯
U+24FBx	𤾰	𤾱	𤾲	𤾳	𤾴	𤾵	𤾶	𤾷	𤾸	𤾹	𤾺	𤾻	𤾼	𤾽	𤾾	𤾿
U+24FCx	𤿀	𤿁	𤿂	𤿃	𤿄	𤿅	𤿆	𤿇	𤿈	𤿉	𤿊	𤿋	𤿌	𤿍	𤿎	𤿏
U+24FDx	𤿐	𤿑	𤿒	𤿓	𤿔	𤿕	𤿖	𤿗	𤿘	𤿙	𤿚	𤿛	𤿜	𤿝	𤿞	𤿟
U+24FEx	𤿠	𤿡	𤿢	𤿣	𤿤	𤿥	𤿦	𤿧	𤿨	𤿩	𤿪	𤿫	𤿬	𤿭	𤿮	𤿯
U+24FFx	𤿰	𤿱	𤿲	𤿳	𤿴	𤿵	𤿶	𤿷	𤿸	𤿹	𤿺	𤿻	𤿼	𤿽	𤿾	𤿿
U+2500x	𥀀	𥀁	𥀂	𥀃	𥀄	𥀅	𥀆	𥀇	𥀈	𥀉	𥀊	𥀋	𥀌	𥀍	𥀎	𥀏
U+2501x	𥀐	𥀑	𥀒	𥀓	𥀔	𥀕	𥀖	𥀗	𥀘	𥀙	𥀚	𥀛	𥀜	𥀝	𥀞	𥀟
U+2502x	𥀠	𥀡	𥀢	𥀣	𥀤	𥀥	𥀦	𥀧	𥀨	𥀩	𥀪	𥀫	𥀬	𥀭	𥀮	𥀯
U+2503x	𥀰	𥀱	𥀲	𥀳	𥀴	𥀵	𥀶	𥀷	𥀸	𥀹	𥀺	𥀻	𥀼	𥀽	𥀾	𥀿
U+2504x	𥁀	𥁁	𥁂	𥁃	𥁄	𥁅	𥁆	𥁇	𥁈	𥁉	𥁊	𥁋	𥁌	𥁍	𥁎	𥁏
U+2505x	𥁐	𥁑	𥁒	𥁓	𥁔	𥁕	𥁖	𥁗	𥁘	𥁙	𥁚	𥁛	𥁜	𥁝	𥁞	𥁟
U+2506x	𥁠	𥁡	𥁢	𥁣	𥁤	𥁥	𥁦	𥁧	𥁨	𥁩	𥁪	𥁫	𥁬	𥁭	𥁮	𥁯
U+2507x	𥁰	𥁱	𥁲	𥁳	𥁴	𥁵	𥁶	𥁷	𥁸	𥁹	𥁺	𥁻	𥁼	𥁽	𥁾	𥁿
U+2508x	𥂀	𥂁	𥂂	𥂃	𥂄	𥂅	𥂆	𥂇	𥂈	𥂉	𥂊	𥂋	𥂌	𥂍	𥂎	𥂏
U+2509x	𥂐	𥂑	𥂒	𥂓	𥂔	𥂕	𥂖	𥂗	𥂘	𥂙	𥂚	𥂛	𥂜	𥂝	𥂞	𥂟
U+250Ax	𥂠	𥂡	𥂢	𥂣	𥂤	𥂥	𥂦	𥂧	𥂨	𥂩	𥂪	𥂫	𥂬	𥂭	𥂮	𥂯
U+250Bx	𥂰	𥂱	𥂲	𥂳	𥂴	𥂵	𥂶	𥂷	𥂸	𥂹	𥂺	𥂻	𥂼	𥂽	𥂾	𥂿
U+250Cx	𥃀	𥃁	𥃂	𥃃	𥃄	𥃅	𥃆	𥃇	𥃈	𥃉	𥃊	𥃋	𥃌	𥃍	𥃎	𥃏
U+250Dx	𥃐	𥃑	𥃒	𥃓	𥃔	𥃕	𥃖	𥃗	𥃘	𥃙	𥃚	𥃛	𥃜	𥃝	𥃞	𥃟
U+250Ex	𥃠	𥃡	𥃢	𥃣	𥃤	𥃥	𥃦	𥃧	𥃨	𥃩	𥃪	𥃫	𥃬	𥃭	𥃮	𥃯
U+250Fx	𥃰	𥃱	𥃲	𥃳	𥃴	𥃵	𥃶	𥃷	𥃸	𥃹	𥃺	𥃻	𥃼	𥃽	𥃾	𥃿
U+2510x	𥄀	𥄁	𥄂	𥄃	𥄄	𥄅	𥄆	𥄇	𥄈	𥄉	𥄊	𥄋	𥄌	𥄍	𥄎	𥄏
U+2511x	𥄐	𥄑	𥄒	𥄓	𥄔	𥄕	𥄖	𥄗	𥄘	𥄙	𥄚	𥄛	𥄜	𥄝	𥄞	𥄟
U+2512x	𥄠	𥄡	𥄢	𥄣	𥄤	𥄥	𥄦	𥄧	𥄨	𥄩	𥄪	𥄫	𥄬	𥄭	𥄮	𥄯
U+2513x	𥄰	𥄱	𥄲	𥄳	𥄴	𥄵	𥄶	𥄷	𥄸	𥄹	𥄺	𥄻	𥄼	𥄽	𥄾	𥄿
U+2514x	𥅀	𥅁	𥅂	𥅃	𥅄	𥅅	𥅆	𥅇	𥅈	𥅉	𥅊	𥅋	𥅌	𥅍	𥅎	𥅏
U+2515x	𥅐	𥅑	𥅒	𥅓	𥅔	𥅕	𥅖	𥅗	𥅘	𥅙	𥅚	𥅛	𥅜	𥅝	𥅞	𥅟
U+2516x	𥅠	𥅡	𥅢	𥅣	𥅤	𥅥	𥅦	𥅧	𥅨	𥅩	𥅪	𥅫	𥅬	𥅭	𥅮	𥅯
U+2517x	𥅰	𥅱	𥅲	𥅳	𥅴	𥅵	𥅶	𥅷	𥅸	𥅹	𥅺	𥅻	𥅼	𥅽	𥅾	𥅿
U+2518x	𥆀	𥆁	𥆂	𥆃	𥆄	𥆅	𥆆	𥆇	𥆈	𥆉	𥆊	𥆋	𥆌	𥆍	𥆎	𥆏
U+2519x	𥆐	𥆑	𥆒	𥆓	𥆔	𥆕	𥆖	𥆗	𥆘	𥆙	𥆚	𥆛	𥆜	𥆝	𥆞	𥆟
U+251Ax	𥆠	𥆡	𥆢	𥆣	𥆤	𥆥	𥆦	𥆧	𥆨	𥆩	𥆪	𥆫	𥆬	𥆭	𥆮	𥆯
U+251Bx	𥆰	𥆱	𥆲	𥆳	𥆴	𥆵	𥆶	𥆷	𥆸	𥆹	𥆺	𥆻	𥆼	𥆽	𥆾	𥆿
U+251Cx	𥇀	𥇁	𥇂	𥇃	𥇄	𥇅	𥇆	𥇇	𥇈	𥇉	𥇊	𥇋	𥇌	𥇍	𥇎	𥇏
U+251Dx	𥇐	𥇑	𥇒	𥇓	𥇔	𥇕	𥇖	𥇗	𥇘	𥇙	𥇚	𥇛	𥇜	𥇝	𥇞	𥇟
U+251Ex	𥇠	𥇡	𥇢	𥇣	𥇤	𥇥	𥇦	𥇧	𥇨	𥇩	𥇪	𥇫	𥇬	𥇭	𥇮	𥇯
U+251Fx	𥇰	𥇱	𥇲	𥇳	𥇴	𥇵	𥇶	𥇷	𥇸	𥇹	𥇺	𥇻	𥇼	𥇽	𥇾	𥇿
U+2520x	𥈀	𥈁	𥈂	𥈃	𥈄	𥈅	𥈆	𥈇	𥈈	𥈉	𥈊	𥈋	𥈌	𥈍	𥈎	𥈏
U+2521x	𥈐	𥈑	𥈒	𥈓	𥈔	𥈕	𥈖	𥈗	𥈘	𥈙	𥈚	𥈛	𥈜	𥈝	𥈞	𥈟
U+2522x	𥈠	𥈡	𥈢	𥈣	𥈤	𥈥	𥈦	𥈧	𥈨	𥈩	𥈪	𥈫	𥈬	𥈭	𥈮	𥈯
U+2523x	𥈰	𥈱	𥈲	𥈳	𥈴	𥈵	𥈶	𥈷	𥈸	𥈹	𥈺	𥈻	𥈼	𥈽	𥈾	𥈿
U+2524x	𥉀	𥉁	𥉂	𥉃	𥉄	𥉅	𥉆	𥉇	𥉈	𥉉	𥉊	𥉋	𥉌	𥉍	𥉎	𥉏
U+2525x	𥉐	𥉑	𥉒	𥉓	𥉔	𥉕	𥉖	𥉗	𥉘	𥉙	𥉚	𥉛	𥉜	𥉝	𥉞	𥉟
U+2526x	𥉠	𥉡	𥉢	𥉣	𥉤	𥉥	𥉦	𥉧	𥉨	𥉩	𥉪	𥉫	𥉬	𥉭	𥉮	𥉯
U+2527x	𥉰	𥉱	𥉲	𥉳	𥉴	𥉵	𥉶	𥉷	𥉸	𥉹	𥉺	𥉻	𥉼	𥉽	𥉾	𥉿
U+2528x	𥊀	𥊁	𥊂	𥊃	𥊄	𥊅	𥊆	𥊇	𥊈	𥊉	𥊊	𥊋	𥊌	𥊍	𥊎	𥊏
U+2529x	𥊐	𥊑	𥊒	𥊓	𥊔	𥊕	𥊖	𥊗	𥊘	𥊙	𥊚	𥊛	𥊜	𥊝	𥊞	𥊟
U+252Ax	𥊠	𥊡	𥊢	𥊣	𥊤	𥊥	𥊦	𥊧	𥊨	𥊩	𥊪	𥊫	𥊬	𥊭	𥊮	𥊯
U+252Bx	𥊰	𥊱	𥊲	𥊳	𥊴	𥊵	𥊶	𥊷	𥊸	𥊹	𥊺	𥊻	𥊼	𥊽	𥊾	𥊿
U+252Cx	𥋀	𥋁	𥋂	𥋃	𥋄	𥋅	𥋆	𥋇	𥋈	𥋉	𥋊	𥋋	𥋌	𥋍	𥋎	𥋏
U+252Dx	𥋐	𥋑	𥋒	𥋓	𥋔	𥋕	𥋖	𥋗	𥋘	𥋙	𥋚	𥋛	𥋜	𥋝	𥋞	𥋟
U+252Ex	𥋠	𥋡	𥋢	𥋣	𥋤	𥋥	𥋦	𥋧	𥋨	𥋩	𥋪	𥋫	𥋬	𥋭	𥋮	𥋯
U+252Fx	𥋰	𥋱	𥋲	𥋳	𥋴	𥋵	𥋶	𥋷	𥋸	𥋹	𥋺	𥋻	𥋼	𥋽	𥋾	𥋿
U+2530x	𥌀	𥌁	𥌂	𥌃	𥌄	𥌅	𥌆	𥌇	𥌈	𥌉	𥌊	𥌋	𥌌	𥌍	𥌎	𥌏
U+2531x	𥌐	𥌑	𥌒	𥌓	𥌔	𥌕	𥌖	𥌗	𥌘	𥌙	𥌚	𥌛	𥌜	𥌝	𥌞	𥌟
U+2532x	𥌠	𥌡	𥌢	𥌣	𥌤	𥌥	𥌦	𥌧	𥌨	𥌩	𥌪	𥌫	𥌬	𥌭	𥌮	𥌯
U+2533x	𥌰	𥌱	𥌲	𥌳	𥌴	𥌵	𥌶	𥌷	𥌸	𥌹	𥌺	𥌻	𥌼	𥌽	𥌾	𥌿
U+2534x	𥍀	𥍁	𥍂	𥍃	𥍄	𥍅	𥍆	𥍇	𥍈	𥍉	𥍊	𥍋	𥍌	𥍍	𥍎	𥍏
U+2535x	𥍐	𥍑	𥍒	𥍓	𥍔	𥍕	𥍖	𥍗	𥍘	𥍙	𥍚	𥍛	𥍜	𥍝	𥍞	𥍟
U+2536x	𥍠	𥍡	𥍢	𥍣	𥍤	𥍥	𥍦	𥍧	𥍨	𥍩	𥍪	𥍫	𥍬	𥍭	𥍮	𥍯
U+2537x	𥍰	𥍱	𥍲	𥍳	𥍴	𥍵	𥍶	𥍷	𥍸	𥍹	𥍺	𥍻	𥍼	𥍽	𥍾	𥍿
U+2538x	𥎀	𥎁	𥎂	𥎃	𥎄	𥎅	𥎆	𥎇	𥎈	𥎉	𥎊	𥎋	𥎌	𥎍	𥎎	𥎏
U+2539x	𥎐	𥎑	𥎒	𥎓	𥎔	𥎕	𥎖	𥎗	𥎘	𥎙	𥎚	𥎛	𥎜	𥎝	𥎞	𥎟
U+253Ax	𥎠	𥎡	𥎢	𥎣	𥎤	𥎥	𥎦	𥎧	𥎨	𥎩	𥎪	𥎫	𥎬	𥎭	𥎮	𥎯
U+253Bx	𥎰	𥎱	𥎲	𥎳	𥎴	𥎵	𥎶	𥎷	𥎸	𥎹	𥎺	𥎻	𥎼	𥎽	𥎾	𥎿
U+253Cx	𥏀	𥏁	𥏂	𥏃	𥏄	𥏅	𥏆	𥏇	𥏈	𥏉	𥏊	𥏋	𥏌	𥏍	𥏎	𥏏
U+253Dx	𥏐	𥏑	𥏒	𥏓	𥏔	𥏕	𥏖	𥏗	𥏘	𥏙	𥏚	𥏛	𥏜	𥏝	𥏞	𥏟
U+253Ex	𥏠	𥏡	𥏢	𥏣	𥏤	𥏥	𥏦	𥏧	𥏨	𥏩	𥏪	𥏫	𥏬	𥏭	𥏮	𥏯
U+253Fx	𥏰	𥏱	𥏲	𥏳	𥏴	𥏵	𥏶	𥏷	𥏸	𥏹	𥏺	𥏻	𥏼	𥏽	𥏾	𥏿
U+2540x	𥐀	𥐁	𥐂	𥐃	𥐄	𥐅	𥐆	𥐇	𥐈	𥐉	𥐊	𥐋	𥐌	𥐍	𥐎	𥐏
U+2541x	𥐐	𥐑	𥐒	𥐓	𥐔	𥐕	𥐖	𥐗	𥐘	𥐙	𥐚	𥐛	𥐜	𥐝	𥐞	𥐟
U+2542x	𥐠	𥐡	𥐢	𥐣	𥐤	𥐥	𥐦	𥐧	𥐨	𥐩	𥐪	𥐫	𥐬	𥐭	𥐮	𥐯
U+2543x	𥐰	𥐱	𥐲	𥐳	𥐴	𥐵	𥐶	𥐷	𥐸	𥐹	𥐺	𥐻	𥐼	𥐽	𥐾	𥐿
U+2544x	𥑀	𥑁	𥑂	𥑃	𥑄	𥑅	𥑆	𥑇	𥑈	𥑉	𥑊	𥑋	𥑌	𥑍	𥑎	𥑏
U+2545x	𥑐	𥑑	𥑒	𥑓	𥑔	𥑕	𥑖	𥑗	𥑘	𥑙	𥑚	𥑛	𥑜	𥑝	𥑞	𥑟
U+2546x	𥑠	𥑡	𥑢	𥑣	𥑤	𥑥	𥑦	𥑧	𥑨	𥑩	𥑪	𥑫	𥑬	𥑭	𥑮	𥑯
U+2547x	𥑰	𥑱	𥑲	𥑳	𥑴	𥑵	𥑶	𥑷	𥑸	𥑹	𥑺	𥑻	𥑼	𥑽	𥑾	𥑿
U+2548x	𥒀	𥒁	𥒂	𥒃	𥒄	𥒅	𥒆	𥒇	𥒈	𥒉	𥒊	𥒋	𥒌	𥒍	𥒎	𥒏
U+2549x	𥒐	𥒑	𥒒	𥒓	𥒔	𥒕	𥒖	𥒗	𥒘	𥒙	𥒚	𥒛	𥒜	𥒝	𥒞	𥒟
U+254Ax	𥒠	𥒡	𥒢	𥒣	𥒤	𥒥	𥒦	𥒧	𥒨	𥒩	𥒪	𥒫	𥒬	𥒭	𥒮	𥒯
U+254Bx	𥒰	𥒱	𥒲	𥒳	𥒴	𥒵	𥒶	𥒷	𥒸	𥒹	𥒺	𥒻	𥒼	𥒽	𥒾	𥒿
U+254Cx	𥓀	𥓁	𥓂	𥓃	𥓄	𥓅	𥓆	𥓇	𥓈	𥓉	𥓊	𥓋	𥓌	𥓍	𥓎	𥓏
U+254Dx	𥓐	𥓑	𥓒	𥓓	𥓔	𥓕	𥓖	𥓗	𥓘	𥓙	𥓚	𥓛	𥓜	𥓝	𥓞	𥓟
U+254Ex	𥓠	𥓡	𥓢	𥓣	𥓤	𥓥	𥓦	𥓧	𥓨	𥓩	𥓪	𥓫	𥓬	𥓭	𥓮	𥓯
U+254Fx	𥓰	𥓱	𥓲	𥓳	𥓴	𥓵	𥓶	𥓷	𥓸	𥓹	𥓺	𥓻	𥓼	𥓽	𥓾	𥓿
U+2550x	𥔀	𥔁	𥔂	𥔃	𥔄	𥔅	𥔆	𥔇	𥔈	𥔉	𥔊	𥔋	𥔌	𥔍	𥔎	𥔏
U+2551x	𥔐	𥔑	𥔒	𥔓	𥔔	𥔕	𥔖	𥔗	𥔘	𥔙	𥔚	𥔛	𥔜	𥔝	𥔞	𥔟
U+2552x	𥔠	𥔡	𥔢	𥔣	𥔤	𥔥	𥔦	𥔧	𥔨	𥔩	𥔪	𥔫	𥔬	𥔭	𥔮	𥔯
U+2553x	𥔰	𥔱	𥔲	𥔳	𥔴	𥔵	𥔶	𥔷	𥔸	𥔹	𥔺	𥔻	𥔼	𥔽	𥔾	𥔿
U+2554x	𥕀	𥕁	𥕂	𥕃	𥕄	𥕅	𥕆	𥕇	𥕈	𥕉	𥕊	𥕋	𥕌	𥕍	𥕎	𥕏
U+2555x	𥕐	𥕑	𥕒	𥕓	𥕔	𥕕	𥕖	𥕗	𥕘	𥕙	𥕚	𥕛	𥕜	𥕝	𥕞	𥕟
U+2556x	𥕠	𥕡	𥕢	𥕣	𥕤	𥕥	𥕦	𥕧	𥕨	𥕩	𥕪	𥕫	𥕬	𥕭	𥕮	𥕯
U+2557x	𥕰	𥕱	𥕲	𥕳	𥕴	𥕵	𥕶	𥕷	𥕸	𥕹	𥕺	𥕻	𥕼	𥕽	𥕾	𥕿
U+2558x	𥖀	𥖁	𥖂	𥖃	𥖄	𥖅	𥖆	𥖇	𥖈	𥖉	𥖊	𥖋	𥖌	𥖍	𥖎	𥖏
U+2559x	𥖐	𥖑	𥖒	𥖓	𥖔	𥖕	𥖖	𥖗	𥖘	𥖙	𥖚	𥖛	𥖜	𥖝	𥖞	𥖟
U+255Ax	𥖠	𥖡	𥖢	𥖣	𥖤	𥖥	𥖦	𥖧	𥖨	𥖩	𥖪	𥖫	𥖬	𥖭	𥖮	𥖯
U+255Bx	𥖰	𥖱	𥖲	𥖳	𥖴	𥖵	𥖶	𥖷	𥖸	𥖹	𥖺	𥖻	𥖼	𥖽	𥖾	𥖿
U+255Cx	𥗀	𥗁	𥗂	𥗃	𥗄	𥗅	𥗆	𥗇	𥗈	𥗉	𥗊	𥗋	𥗌	𥗍	𥗎	𥗏
U+255Dx	𥗐	𥗑	𥗒	𥗓	𥗔	𥗕	𥗖	𥗗	𥗘	𥗙	𥗚	𥗛	𥗜	𥗝	𥗞	𥗟
U+255Ex	𥗠	𥗡	𥗢	𥗣	𥗤	𥗥	𥗦	𥗧	𥗨	𥗩	𥗪	𥗫	𥗬	𥗭	𥗮	𥗯
U+255Fx	𥗰	𥗱	𥗲	𥗳	𥗴	𥗵	𥗶	𥗷	𥗸	𥗹	𥗺	𥗻	𥗼	𥗽	𥗾	𥗿
U+2560x	𥘀	𥘁	𥘂	𥘃	𥘄	𥘅	𥘆	𥘇	𥘈	𥘉	𥘊	𥘋	𥘌	𥘍	𥘎	𥘏
U+2561x	𥘐	𥘑	𥘒	𥘓	𥘔	𥘕	𥘖	𥘗	𥘘	𥘙	𥘚	𥘛	𥘜	𥘝	𥘞	𥘟
U+2562x	𥘠	𥘡	𥘢	𥘣	𥘤	𥘥	𥘦	𥘧	𥘨	𥘩	𥘪	𥘫	𥘬	𥘭	𥘮	𥘯
U+2563x	𥘰	𥘱	𥘲	𥘳	𥘴	𥘵	𥘶	𥘷	𥘸	𥘹	𥘺	𥘻	𥘼	𥘽	𥘾	𥘿
U+2564x	𥙀	𥙁	𥙂	𥙃	𥙄	𥙅	𥙆	𥙇	𥙈	𥙉	𥙊	𥙋	𥙌	𥙍	𥙎	𥙏
U+2565x	𥙐	𥙑	𥙒	𥙓	𥙔	𥙕	𥙖	𥙗	𥙘	𥙙	𥙚	𥙛	𥙜	𥙝	𥙞	𥙟
U+2566x	𥙠	𥙡	𥙢	𥙣	𥙤	𥙥	𥙦	𥙧	𥙨	𥙩	𥙪	𥙫	𥙬	𥙭	𥙮	𥙯
U+2567x	𥙰	𥙱	𥙲	𥙳	𥙴	𥙵	𥙶	𥙷	𥙸	𥙹	𥙺	𥙻	𥙼	𥙽	𥙾	𥙿
U+2568x	𥚀	𥚁	𥚂	𥚃	𥚄	𥚅	𥚆	𥚇	𥚈	𥚉	𥚊	𥚋	𥚌	𥚍	𥚎	𥚏
U+2569x	𥚐	𥚑	𥚒	𥚓	𥚔	𥚕	𥚖	𥚗	𥚘	𥚙	𥚚	𥚛	𥚜	𥚝	𥚞	𥚟
U+256Ax	𥚠	𥚡	𥚢	𥚣	𥚤	𥚥	𥚦	𥚧	𥚨	𥚩	𥚪	𥚫	𥚬	𥚭	𥚮	𥚯
U+256Bx	𥚰	𥚱	𥚲	𥚳	𥚴	𥚵	𥚶	𥚷	𥚸	𥚹	𥚺	𥚻	𥚼	𥚽	𥚾	𥚿
U+256Cx	𥛀	𥛁	𥛂	𥛃	𥛄	𥛅	𥛆	𥛇	𥛈	𥛉	𥛊	𥛋	𥛌	𥛍	𥛎	𥛏
U+256Dx	𥛐	𥛑	𥛒	𥛓	𥛔	𥛕	𥛖	𥛗	𥛘	𥛙	𥛚	𥛛	𥛜	𥛝	𥛞	𥛟
U+256Ex	𥛠	𥛡	𥛢	𥛣	𥛤	𥛥	𥛦	𥛧	𥛨	𥛩	𥛪	𥛫	𥛬	𥛭	𥛮	𥛯
U+256Fx	𥛰	𥛱	𥛲	𥛳	𥛴	𥛵	𥛶	𥛷	𥛸	𥛹	𥛺	𥛻	𥛼	𥛽	𥛾	𥛿
U+2570x	𥜀	𥜁	𥜂	𥜃	𥜄	𥜅	𥜆	𥜇	𥜈	𥜉	𥜊	𥜋	𥜌	𥜍	𥜎	𥜏
U+2571x	𥜐	𥜑	𥜒	𥜓	𥜔	𥜕	𥜖	𥜗	𥜘	𥜙	𥜚	𥜛	𥜜	𥜝	𥜞	𥜟
U+2572x	𥜠	𥜡	𥜢	𥜣	𥜤	𥜥	𥜦	𥜧	𥜨	𥜩	𥜪	𥜫	𥜬	𥜭	𥜮	𥜯
U+2573x	𥜰	𥜱	𥜲	𥜳	𥜴	𥜵	𥜶	𥜷	𥜸	𥜹	𥜺	𥜻	𥜼	𥜽	𥜾	𥜿
U+2574x	𥝀	𥝁	𥝂	𥝃	𥝄	𥝅	𥝆	𥝇	𥝈	𥝉	𥝊	𥝋	𥝌	𥝍	𥝎	𥝏
U+2575x	𥝐	𥝑	𥝒	𥝓	𥝔	𥝕	𥝖	𥝗	𥝘	𥝙	𥝚	𥝛	𥝜	𥝝	𥝞	𥝟
U+2576x	𥝠	𥝡	𥝢	𥝣	𥝤	𥝥	𥝦	𥝧	𥝨	𥝩	𥝪	𥝫	𥝬	𥝭	𥝮	𥝯
U+2577x	𥝰	𥝱	𥝲	𥝳	𥝴	𥝵	𥝶	𥝷	𥝸	𥝹	𥝺	𥝻	𥝼	𥝽	𥝾	𥝿
U+2578x	𥞀	𥞁	𥞂	𥞃	𥞄	𥞅	𥞆	𥞇	𥞈	𥞉	𥞊	𥞋	𥞌	𥞍	𥞎	𥞏
U+2579x	𥞐	𥞑	𥞒	𥞓	𥞔	𥞕	𥞖	𥞗	𥞘	𥞙	𥞚	𥞛	𥞜	𥞝	𥞞	𥞟
U+257Ax	𥞠	𥞡	𥞢	𥞣	𥞤	𥞥	𥞦	𥞧	𥞨	𥞩	𥞪	𥞫	𥞬	𥞭	𥞮	𥞯
U+257Bx	𥞰	𥞱	𥞲	𥞳	𥞴	𥞵	𥞶	𥞷	𥞸	𥞹	𥞺	𥞻	𥞼	𥞽	𥞾	𥞿
U+257Cx	𥟀	𥟁	𥟂	𥟃	𥟄	𥟅	𥟆	𥟇	𥟈	𥟉	𥟊	𥟋	𥟌	𥟍	𥟎	𥟏
U+257Dx	𥟐	𥟑	𥟒	𥟓	𥟔	𥟕	𥟖	𥟗	𥟘	𥟙	𥟚	𥟛	𥟜	𥟝	𥟞	𥟟
U+257Ex	𥟠	𥟡	𥟢	𥟣	𥟤	𥟥	𥟦	𥟧	𥟨	𥟩	𥟪	𥟫	𥟬	𥟭	𥟮	𥟯
U+257Fx	𥟰	𥟱	𥟲	𥟳	𥟴	𥟵	𥟶	𥟷	𥟸	𥟹	𥟺	𥟻	𥟼	𥟽	𥟾	𥟿
U+2580x	𥠀	𥠁	𥠂	𥠃	𥠄	𥠅	𥠆	𥠇	𥠈	𥠉	𥠊	𥠋	𥠌	𥠍	𥠎	𥠏
U+2581x	𥠐	𥠑	𥠒	𥠓	𥠔	𥠕	𥠖	𥠗	𥠘	𥠙	𥠚	𥠛	𥠜	𥠝	𥠞	𥠟
U+2582x	𥠠	𥠡	𥠢	𥠣	𥠤	𥠥	𥠦	𥠧	𥠨	𥠩	𥠪	𥠫	𥠬	𥠭	𥠮	𥠯
U+2583x	𥠰	𥠱	𥠲	𥠳	𥠴	𥠵	𥠶	𥠷	𥠸	𥠹	𥠺	𥠻	𥠼	𥠽	𥠾	𥠿
U+2584x	𥡀	𥡁	𥡂	𥡃	𥡄	𥡅	𥡆	𥡇	𥡈	𥡉	𥡊	𥡋	𥡌	𥡍	𥡎	𥡏
U+2585x	𥡐	𥡑	𥡒	𥡓	𥡔	𥡕	𥡖	𥡗	𥡘	𥡙	𥡚	𥡛	𥡜	𥡝	𥡞	𥡟
U+2586x	𥡠	𥡡	𥡢	𥡣	𥡤	𥡥	𥡦	𥡧	𥡨	𥡩	𥡪	𥡫	𥡬	𥡭	𥡮	𥡯
U+2587x	𥡰	𥡱	𥡲	𥡳	𥡴	𥡵	𥡶	𥡷	𥡸	𥡹	𥡺	𥡻	𥡼	𥡽	𥡾	𥡿
U+2588x	𥢀	𥢁	𥢂	𥢃	𥢄	𥢅	𥢆	𥢇	𥢈	𥢉	𥢊	𥢋	𥢌	𥢍	𥢎	𥢏
U+2589x	𥢐	𥢑	𥢒	𥢓	𥢔	𥢕	𥢖	𥢗	𥢘	𥢙	𥢚	𥢛	𥢜	𥢝	𥢞	𥢟
U+258Ax	𥢠	𥢡	𥢢	𥢣	𥢤	𥢥	𥢦	𥢧	𥢨	𥢩	𥢪	𥢫	𥢬	𥢭	𥢮	𥢯
U+258Bx	𥢰	𥢱	𥢲	𥢳	𥢴	𥢵	𥢶	𥢷	𥢸	𥢹	𥢺	𥢻	𥢼	𥢽	𥢾	𥢿
U+258Cx	𥣀	𥣁	𥣂	𥣃	𥣄	𥣅	𥣆	𥣇	𥣈	𥣉	𥣊	𥣋	𥣌	𥣍	𥣎	𥣏
U+258Dx	𥣐	𥣑	𥣒	𥣓	𥣔	𥣕	𥣖	𥣗	𥣘	𥣙	𥣚	𥣛	𥣜	𥣝	𥣞	𥣟
U+258Ex	𥣠	𥣡	𥣢	𥣣	𥣤	𥣥	𥣦	𥣧	𥣨	𥣩	𥣪	𥣫	𥣬	𥣭	𥣮	𥣯
U+258Fx	𥣰	𥣱	𥣲	𥣳	𥣴	𥣵	𥣶	𥣷	𥣸	𥣹	𥣺	𥣻	𥣼	𥣽	𥣾	𥣿
U+2590x	𥤀	𥤁	𥤂	𥤃	𥤄	𥤅	𥤆	𥤇	𥤈	𥤉	𥤊	𥤋	𥤌	𥤍	𥤎	𥤏
U+2591x	𥤐	𥤑	𥤒	𥤓	𥤔	𥤕	𥤖	𥤗	𥤘	𥤙	𥤚	𥤛	𥤜	𥤝	𥤞	𥤟
U+2592x	𥤠	𥤡	𥤢	𥤣	𥤤	𥤥	𥤦	𥤧	𥤨	𥤩	𥤪	𥤫	𥤬	𥤭	𥤮	𥤯
U+2593x	𥤰	𥤱	𥤲	𥤳	𥤴	𥤵	𥤶	𥤷	𥤸	𥤹	𥤺	𥤻	𥤼	𥤽	𥤾	𥤿
U+2594x	𥥀	𥥁	𥥂	𥥃	𥥄	𥥅	𥥆	𥥇	𥥈	𥥉	𥥊	𥥋	𥥌	𥥍	𥥎	𥥏
U+2595x	𥥐	𥥑	𥥒	𥥓	𥥔	𥥕	𥥖	𥥗	𥥘	𥥙	𥥚	𥥛	𥥜	𥥝	𥥞	𥥟
U+2596x	𥥠	𥥡	𥥢	𥥣	𥥤	𥥥	𥥦	𥥧	𥥨	𥥩	𥥪	𥥫	𥥬	𥥭	𥥮	𥥯
U+2597x	𥥰	𥥱	𥥲	𥥳	𥥴	𥥵	𥥶	𥥷	𥥸	𥥹	𥥺	𥥻	𥥼	𥥽	𥥾	𥥿
U+2598x	𥦀	𥦁	𥦂	𥦃	𥦄	𥦅	𥦆	𥦇	𥦈	𥦉	𥦊	𥦋	𥦌	𥦍	𥦎	𥦏
U+2599x	𥦐	𥦑	𥦒	𥦓	𥦔	𥦕	𥦖	𥦗	𥦘	𥦙	𥦚	𥦛	𥦜	𥦝	𥦞	𥦟
U+259Ax	𥦠	𥦡	𥦢	𥦣	𥦤	𥦥	𥦦	𥦧	𥦨	𥦩	𥦪	𥦫	𥦬	𥦭	𥦮	𥦯
U+259Bx	𥦰	𥦱	𥦲	𥦳	𥦴	𥦵	𥦶	𥦷	𥦸	𥦹	𥦺	𥦻	𥦼	𥦽	𥦾	𥦿
U+259Cx	𥧀	𥧁	𥧂	𥧃	𥧄	𥧅	𥧆	𥧇	𥧈	𥧉	𥧊	𥧋	𥧌	𥧍	𥧎	𥧏
U+259Dx	𥧐	𥧑	𥧒	𥧓	𥧔	𥧕	𥧖	𥧗	𥧘	𥧙	𥧚	𥧛	𥧜	𥧝	𥧞	𥧟
U+259Ex	𥧠	𥧡	𥧢	𥧣	𥧤	𥧥	𥧦	𥧧	𥧨	𥧩	𥧪	𥧫	𥧬	𥧭	𥧮	𥧯
U+259Fx	𥧰	𥧱	𥧲	𥧳	𥧴	𥧵	𥧶	𥧷	𥧸	𥧹	𥧺	𥧻	𥧼	𥧽	𥧾	𥧿
U+25A0x	𥨀	𥨁	𥨂	𥨃	𥨄	𥨅	𥨆	𥨇	𥨈	𥨉	𥨊	𥨋	𥨌	𥨍	𥨎	𥨏
U+25A1x	𥨐	𥨑	𥨒	𥨓	𥨔	𥨕	𥨖	𥨗	𥨘	𥨙	𥨚	𥨛	𥨜	𥨝	𥨞	𥨟
U+25A2x	𥨠	𥨡	𥨢	𥨣	𥨤	𥨥	𥨦	𥨧	𥨨	𥨩	𥨪	𥨫	𥨬	𥨭	𥨮	𥨯
U+25A3x	𥨰	𥨱	𥨲	𥨳	𥨴	𥨵	𥨶	𥨷	𥨸	𥨹	𥨺	𥨻	𥨼	𥨽	𥨾	𥨿
U+25A4x	𥩀	𥩁	𥩂	𥩃	𥩄	𥩅	𥩆	𥩇	𥩈	𥩉	𥩊	𥩋	𥩌	𥩍	𥩎	𥩏
U+25A5x	𥩐	𥩑	𥩒	𥩓	𥩔	𥩕	𥩖	𥩗	𥩘	𥩙	𥩚	𥩛	𥩜	𥩝	𥩞	𥩟
U+25A6x	𥩠	𥩡	𥩢	𥩣	𥩤	𥩥	𥩦	𥩧	𥩨	𥩩	𥩪	𥩫	𥩬	𥩭	𥩮	𥩯
U+25A7x	𥩰	𥩱	𥩲	𥩳	𥩴	𥩵	𥩶	𥩷	𥩸	𥩹	𥩺	𥩻	𥩼	𥩽	𥩾	𥩿
U+25A8x	𥪀	𥪁	𥪂	𥪃	𥪄	𥪅	𥪆	𥪇	𥪈	𥪉	𥪊	𥪋	𥪌	𥪍	𥪎	𥪏
U+25A9x	𥪐	𥪑	𥪒	𥪓	𥪔	𥪕	𥪖	𥪗	𥪘	𥪙	𥪚	𥪛	𥪜	𥪝	𥪞	𥪟
U+25AAx	𥪠	𥪡	𥪢	𥪣	𥪤	𥪥	𥪦	𥪧	𥪨	𥪩	𥪪	𥪫	𥪬	𥪭	𥪮	𥪯
U+25ABx	𥪰	𥪱	𥪲	𥪳	𥪴	𥪵	𥪶	𥪷	𥪸	𥪹	𥪺	𥪻	𥪼	𥪽	𥪾	𥪿
U+25ACx	𥫀	𥫁	𥫂	𥫃	𥫄	𥫅	𥫆	𥫇	𥫈	𥫉	𥫊	𥫋	𥫌	𥫍	𥫎	𥫏
U+25ADx	𥫐	𥫑	𥫒	𥫓	𥫔	𥫕	𥫖	𥫗	𥫘	𥫙	𥫚	𥫛	𥫜	𥫝	𥫞	𥫟
U+25AEx	𥫠	𥫡	𥫢	𥫣	𥫤	𥫥	𥫦	𥫧	𥫨	𥫩	𥫪	𥫫	𥫬	𥫭	𥫮	𥫯
U+25AFx	𥫰	𥫱	𥫲	𥫳	𥫴	𥫵	𥫶	𥫷	𥫸	𥫹	𥫺	𥫻	𥫼	𥫽	𥫾	𥫿
U+25B0x	𥬀	𥬁	𥬂	𥬃	𥬄	𥬅	𥬆	𥬇	𥬈	𥬉	𥬊	𥬋	𥬌	𥬍	𥬎	𥬏
U+25B1x	𥬐	𥬑	𥬒	𥬓	𥬔	𥬕	𥬖	𥬗	𥬘	𥬙	𥬚	𥬛	𥬜	𥬝	𥬞	𥬟
U+25B2x	𥬠	𥬡	𥬢	𥬣	𥬤	𥬥	𥬦	𥬧	𥬨	𥬩	𥬪	𥬫	𥬬	𥬭	𥬮	𥬯
U+25B3x	𥬰	𥬱	𥬲	𥬳	𥬴	𥬵	𥬶	𥬷	𥬸	𥬹	𥬺	𥬻	𥬼	𥬽	𥬾	𥬿
U+25B4x	𥭀	𥭁	𥭂	𥭃	𥭄	𥭅	𥭆	𥭇	𥭈	𥭉	𥭊	𥭋	𥭌	𥭍	𥭎	𥭏
U+25B5x	𥭐	𥭑	𥭒	𥭓	𥭔	𥭕	𥭖	𥭗	𥭘	𥭙	𥭚	𥭛	𥭜	𥭝	𥭞	𥭟
U+25B6x	𥭠	𥭡	𥭢	𥭣	𥭤	𥭥	𥭦	𥭧	𥭨	𥭩	𥭪	𥭫	𥭬	𥭭	𥭮	𥭯
U+25B7x	𥭰	𥭱	𥭲	𥭳	𥭴	𥭵	𥭶	𥭷	𥭸	𥭹	𥭺	𥭻	𥭼	𥭽	𥭾	𥭿
U+25B8x	𥮀	𥮁	𥮂	𥮃	𥮄	𥮅	𥮆	𥮇	𥮈	𥮉	𥮊	𥮋	𥮌	𥮍	𥮎	𥮏
U+25B9x	𥮐	𥮑	𥮒	𥮓	𥮔	𥮕	𥮖	𥮗	𥮘	𥮙	𥮚	𥮛	𥮜	𥮝	𥮞	𥮟
U+25BAx	𥮠	𥮡	𥮢	𥮣	𥮤	𥮥	𥮦	𥮧	𥮨	𥮩	𥮪	𥮫	𥮬	𥮭	𥮮	𥮯
U+25BBx	𥮰	𥮱	𥮲	𥮳	𥮴	𥮵	𥮶	𥮷	𥮸	𥮹	𥮺	𥮻	𥮼	𥮽	𥮾	𥮿
U+25BCx	𥯀	𥯁	𥯂	𥯃	𥯄	𥯅	𥯆	𥯇	𥯈	𥯉	𥯊	𥯋	𥯌	𥯍	𥯎	𥯏
U+25BDx	𥯐	𥯑	𥯒	𥯓	𥯔	𥯕	𥯖	𥯗	𥯘	𥯙	𥯚	𥯛	𥯜	𥯝	𥯞	𥯟
U+25BEx	𥯠	𥯡	𥯢	𥯣	𥯤	𥯥	𥯦	𥯧	𥯨	𥯩	𥯪	𥯫	𥯬	𥯭	𥯮	𥯯
U+25BFx	𥯰	𥯱	𥯲	𥯳	𥯴	𥯵	𥯶	𥯷	𥯸	𥯹	𥯺	𥯻	𥯼	𥯽	𥯾	𥯿
U+25C0x	𥰀	𥰁	𥰂	𥰃	𥰄	𥰅	𥰆	𥰇	𥰈	𥰉	𥰊	𥰋	𥰌	𥰍	𥰎	𥰏
U+25C1x	𥰐	𥰑	𥰒	𥰓	𥰔	𥰕	𥰖	𥰗	𥰘	𥰙	𥰚	𥰛	𥰜	𥰝	𥰞	𥰟
U+25C2x	𥰠	𥰡	𥰢	𥰣	𥰤	𥰥	𥰦	𥰧	𥰨	𥰩	𥰪	𥰫	𥰬	𥰭	𥰮	𥰯
U+25C3x	𥰰	𥰱	𥰲	𥰳	𥰴	𥰵	𥰶	𥰷	𥰸	𥰹	𥰺	𥰻	𥰼	𥰽	𥰾	𥰿
U+25C4x	𥱀	𥱁	𥱂	𥱃	𥱄	𥱅	𥱆	𥱇	𥱈	𥱉	𥱊	𥱋	𥱌	𥱍	𥱎	𥱏
U+25C5x	𥱐	𥱑	𥱒	𥱓	𥱔	𥱕	𥱖	𥱗	𥱘	𥱙	𥱚	𥱛	𥱜	𥱝	𥱞	𥱟
U+25C6x	𥱠	𥱡	𥱢	𥱣	𥱤	𥱥	𥱦	𥱧	𥱨	𥱩	𥱪	𥱫	𥱬	𥱭	𥱮	𥱯
U+25C7x	𥱰	𥱱	𥱲	𥱳	𥱴	𥱵	𥱶	𥱷	𥱸	𥱹	𥱺	𥱻	𥱼	𥱽	𥱾	𥱿
U+25C8x	𥲀	𥲁	𥲂	𥲃	𥲄	𥲅	𥲆	𥲇	𥲈	𥲉	𥲊	𥲋	𥲌	𥲍	𥲎	𥲏
U+25C9x	𥲐	𥲑	𥲒	𥲓	𥲔	𥲕	𥲖	𥲗	𥲘	𥲙	𥲚	𥲛	𥲜	𥲝	𥲞	𥲟
U+25CAx	𥲠	𥲡	𥲢	𥲣	𥲤	𥲥	𥲦	𥲧	𥲨	𥲩	𥲪	𥲫	𥲬	𥲭	𥲮	𥲯
U+25CBx	𥲰	𥲱	𥲲	𥲳	𥲴	𥲵	𥲶	𥲷	𥲸	𥲹	𥲺	𥲻	𥲼	𥲽	𥲾	𥲿
U+25CCx	𥳀	𥳁	𥳂	𥳃	𥳄	𥳅	𥳆	𥳇	𥳈	𥳉	𥳊	𥳋	𥳌	𥳍	𥳎	𥳏
U+25CDx	𥳐	𥳑	𥳒	𥳓	𥳔	𥳕	𥳖	𥳗	𥳘	𥳙	𥳚	𥳛	𥳜	𥳝	𥳞	𥳟
U+25CEx	𥳠	𥳡	𥳢	𥳣	𥳤	𥳥	𥳦	𥳧	𥳨	𥳩	𥳪	𥳫	𥳬	𥳭	𥳮	𥳯
U+25CFx	𥳰	𥳱	𥳲	𥳳	𥳴	𥳵	𥳶	𥳷	𥳸	𥳹	𥳺	𥳻	𥳼	𥳽	𥳾	𥳿
U+25D0x	𥴀	𥴁	𥴂	𥴃	𥴄	𥴅	𥴆	𥴇	𥴈	𥴉	𥴊	𥴋	𥴌	𥴍	𥴎	𥴏
U+25D1x	𥴐	𥴑	𥴒	𥴓	𥴔	𥴕	𥴖	𥴗	𥴘	𥴙	𥴚	𥴛	𥴜	𥴝	𥴞	𥴟
U+25D2x	𥴠	𥴡	𥴢	𥴣	𥴤	𥴥	𥴦	𥴧	𥴨	𥴩	𥴪	𥴫	𥴬	𥴭	𥴮	𥴯
U+25D3x	𥴰	𥴱	𥴲	𥴳	𥴴	𥴵	𥴶	𥴷	𥴸	𥴹	𥴺	𥴻	𥴼	𥴽	𥴾	𥴿
U+25D4x	𥵀	𥵁	𥵂	𥵃	𥵄	𥵅	𥵆	𥵇	𥵈	𥵉	𥵊	𥵋	𥵌	𥵍	𥵎	𥵏
U+25D5x	𥵐	𥵑	𥵒	𥵓	𥵔	𥵕	𥵖	𥵗	𥵘	𥵙	𥵚	𥵛	𥵜	𥵝	𥵞	𥵟
U+25D6x	𥵠	𥵡	𥵢	𥵣	𥵤	𥵥	𥵦	𥵧	𥵨	𥵩	𥵪	𥵫	𥵬	𥵭	𥵮	𥵯
U+25D7x	𥵰	𥵱	𥵲	𥵳	𥵴	𥵵	𥵶	𥵷	𥵸	𥵹	𥵺	𥵻	𥵼	𥵽	𥵾	𥵿
U+25D8x	𥶀	𥶁	𥶂	𥶃	𥶄	𥶅	𥶆	𥶇	𥶈	𥶉	𥶊	𥶋	𥶌	𥶍	𥶎	𥶏
U+25D9x	𥶐	𥶑	𥶒	𥶓	𥶔	𥶕	𥶖	𥶗	𥶘	𥶙	𥶚	𥶛	𥶜	𥶝	𥶞	𥶟
U+25DAx	𥶠	𥶡	𥶢	𥶣	𥶤	𥶥	𥶦	𥶧	𥶨	𥶩	𥶪	𥶫	𥶬	𥶭	𥶮	𥶯
U+25DBx	𥶰	𥶱	𥶲	𥶳	𥶴	𥶵	𥶶	𥶷	𥶸	𥶹	𥶺	𥶻	𥶼	𥶽	𥶾	𥶿
U+25DCx	𥷀	𥷁	𥷂	𥷃	𥷄	𥷅	𥷆	𥷇	𥷈	𥷉	𥷊	𥷋	𥷌	𥷍	𥷎	𥷏
U+25DDx	𥷐	𥷑	𥷒	𥷓	𥷔	𥷕	𥷖	𥷗	𥷘	𥷙	𥷚	𥷛	𥷜	𥷝	𥷞	𥷟
U+25DEx	𥷠	𥷡	𥷢	𥷣	𥷤	𥷥	𥷦	𥷧	𥷨	𥷩	𥷪	𥷫	𥷬	𥷭	𥷮	𥷯
U+25DFx	𥷰	𥷱	𥷲	𥷳	𥷴	𥷵	𥷶	𥷷	𥷸	𥷹	𥷺	𥷻	𥷼	𥷽	𥷾	𥷿
U+25E0x	𥸀	𥸁	𥸂	𥸃	𥸄	𥸅	𥸆	𥸇	𥸈	𥸉	𥸊	𥸋	𥸌	𥸍	𥸎	𥸏
U+25E1x	𥸐	𥸑	𥸒	𥸓	𥸔	𥸕	𥸖	𥸗	𥸘	𥸙	𥸚	𥸛	𥸜	𥸝	𥸞	𥸟
U+25E2x	𥸠	𥸡	𥸢	𥸣	𥸤	𥸥	𥸦	𥸧	𥸨	𥸩	𥸪	𥸫	𥸬	𥸭	𥸮	𥸯
U+25E3x	𥸰	𥸱	𥸲	𥸳	𥸴	𥸵	𥸶	𥸷	𥸸	𥸹	𥸺	𥸻	𥸼	𥸽	𥸾	𥸿
U+25E4x	𥹀	𥹁	𥹂	𥹃	𥹄	𥹅	𥹆	𥹇	𥹈	𥹉	𥹊	𥹋	𥹌	𥹍	𥹎	𥹏
U+25E5x	𥹐	𥹑	𥹒	𥹓	𥹔	𥹕	𥹖	𥹗	𥹘	𥹙	𥹚	𥹛	𥹜	𥹝	𥹞	𥹟
U+25E6x	𥹠	𥹡	𥹢	𥹣	𥹤	𥹥	𥹦	𥹧	𥹨	𥹩	𥹪	𥹫	𥹬	𥹭	𥹮	𥹯
U+25E7x	𥹰	𥹱	𥹲	𥹳	𥹴	𥹵	𥹶	𥹷	𥹸	𥹹	𥹺	𥹻	𥹼	𥹽	𥹾	𥹿
U+25E8x	𥺀	𥺁	𥺂	𥺃	𥺄	𥺅	𥺆	𥺇	𥺈	𥺉	𥺊	𥺋	𥺌	𥺍	𥺎	𥺏
U+25E9x	𥺐	𥺑	𥺒	𥺓	𥺔	𥺕	𥺖	𥺗	𥺘	𥺙	𥺚	𥺛	𥺜	𥺝	𥺞	𥺟
U+25EAx	𥺠	𥺡	𥺢	𥺣	𥺤	𥺥	𥺦	𥺧	𥺨	𥺩	𥺪	𥺫	𥺬	𥺭	𥺮	𥺯
U+25EBx	𥺰	𥺱	𥺲	𥺳	𥺴	𥺵	𥺶	𥺷	𥺸	𥺹	𥺺	𥺻	𥺼	𥺽	𥺾	𥺿
U+25ECx	𥻀	𥻁	𥻂	𥻃	𥻄	𥻅	𥻆	𥻇	𥻈	𥻉	𥻊	𥻋	𥻌	𥻍	𥻎	𥻏
U+25EDx	𥻐	𥻑	𥻒	𥻓	𥻔	𥻕	𥻖	𥻗	𥻘	𥻙	𥻚	𥻛	𥻜	𥻝	𥻞	𥻟
U+25EEx	𥻠	𥻡	𥻢	𥻣	𥻤	𥻥	𥻦	𥻧	𥻨	𥻩	𥻪	𥻫	𥻬	𥻭	𥻮	𥻯
U+25EFx	𥻰	𥻱	𥻲	𥻳	𥻴	𥻵	𥻶	𥻷	𥻸	𥻹	𥻺	𥻻	𥻼	𥻽	𥻾	𥻿
U+25F0x	𥼀	𥼁	𥼂	𥼃	𥼄	𥼅	𥼆	𥼇	𥼈	𥼉	𥼊	𥼋	𥼌	𥼍	𥼎	𥼏
U+25F1x	𥼐	𥼑	𥼒	𥼓	𥼔	𥼕	𥼖	𥼗	𥼘	𥼙	𥼚	𥼛	𥼜	𥼝	𥼞	𥼟
U+25F2x	𥼠	𥼡	𥼢	𥼣	𥼤	𥼥	𥼦	𥼧	𥼨	𥼩	𥼪	𥼫	𥼬	𥼭	𥼮	𥼯
U+25F3x	𥼰	𥼱	𥼲	𥼳	𥼴	𥼵	𥼶	𥼷	𥼸	𥼹	𥼺	𥼻	𥼼	𥼽	𥼾	𥼿
U+25F4x	𥽀	𥽁	𥽂	𥽃	𥽄	𥽅	𥽆	𥽇	𥽈	𥽉	𥽊	𥽋	𥽌	𥽍	𥽎	𥽏
U+25F5x	𥽐	𥽑	𥽒	𥽓	𥽔	𥽕	𥽖	𥽗	𥽘	𥽙	𥽚	𥽛	𥽜	𥽝	𥽞	𥽟
U+25F6x	𥽠	𥽡	𥽢	𥽣	𥽤	𥽥	𥽦	𥽧	𥽨	𥽩	𥽪	𥽫	𥽬	𥽭	𥽮	𥽯
U+25F7x	𥽰	𥽱	𥽲	𥽳	𥽴	𥽵	𥽶	𥽷	𥽸	𥽹	𥽺	𥽻	𥽼	𥽽	𥽾	𥽿
U+25F8x	𥾀	𥾁	𥾂	𥾃	𥾄	𥾅	𥾆	𥾇	𥾈	𥾉	𥾊	𥾋	𥾌	𥾍	𥾎	𥾏
U+25F9x	𥾐	𥾑	𥾒	𥾓	𥾔	𥾕	𥾖	𥾗	𥾘	𥾙	𥾚	𥾛	𥾜	𥾝	𥾞	𥾟
U+25FAx	𥾠	𥾡	𥾢	𥾣	𥾤	𥾥	𥾦	𥾧	𥾨	𥾩	𥾪	𥾫	𥾬	𥾭	𥾮	𥾯
U+25FBx	𥾰	𥾱	𥾲	𥾳	𥾴	𥾵	𥾶	𥾷	𥾸	𥾹	𥾺	𥾻	𥾼	𥾽	𥾾	𥾿
U+25FCx	𥿀	𥿁	𥿂	𥿃	𥿄	𥿅	𥿆	𥿇	𥿈	𥿉	𥿊	𥿋	𥿌	𥿍	𥿎	𥿏
U+25FDx	𥿐	𥿑	𥿒	𥿓	𥿔	𥿕	𥿖	𥿗	𥿘	𥿙	𥿚	𥿛	𥿜	𥿝	𥿞	𥿟
U+25FEx	𥿠	𥿡	𥿢	𥿣	𥿤	𥿥	𥿦	𥿧	𥿨	𥿩	𥿪	𥿫	𥿬	𥿭	𥿮	𥿯
U+25FFx	𥿰	𥿱	𥿲	𥿳	𥿴	𥿵	𥿶	𥿷	𥿸	𥿹	𥿺	𥿻	𥿼	𥿽	𥿾	𥿿
U+2600x	𦀀	𦀁	𦀂	𦀃	𦀄	𦀅	𦀆	𦀇	𦀈	𦀉	𦀊	𦀋	𦀌	𦀍	𦀎	𦀏
U+2601x	𦀐	𦀑	𦀒	𦀓	𦀔	𦀕	𦀖	𦀗	𦀘	𦀙	𦀚	𦀛	𦀜	𦀝	𦀞	𦀟
U+2602x	𦀠	𦀡	𦀢	𦀣	𦀤	𦀥	𦀦	𦀧	𦀨	𦀩	𦀪	𦀫	𦀬	𦀭	𦀮	𦀯
U+2603x	𦀰	𦀱	𦀲	𦀳	𦀴	𦀵	𦀶	𦀷	𦀸	𦀹	𦀺	𦀻	𦀼	𦀽	𦀾	𦀿
U+2604x	𦁀	𦁁	𦁂	𦁃	𦁄	𦁅	𦁆	𦁇	𦁈	𦁉	𦁊	𦁋	𦁌	𦁍	𦁎	𦁏
U+2605x	𦁐	𦁑	𦁒	𦁓	𦁔	𦁕	𦁖	𦁗	𦁘	𦁙	𦁚	𦁛	𦁜	𦁝	𦁞	𦁟
U+2606x	𦁠	𦁡	𦁢	𦁣	𦁤	𦁥	𦁦	𦁧	𦁨	𦁩	𦁪	𦁫	𦁬	𦁭	𦁮	𦁯
U+2607x	𦁰	𦁱	𦁲	𦁳	𦁴	𦁵	𦁶	𦁷	𦁸	𦁹	𦁺	𦁻	𦁼	𦁽	𦁾	𦁿
U+2608x	𦂀	𦂁	𦂂	𦂃	𦂄	𦂅	𦂆	𦂇	𦂈	𦂉	𦂊	𦂋	𦂌	𦂍	𦂎	𦂏
U+2609x	𦂐	𦂑	𦂒	𦂓	𦂔	𦂕	𦂖	𦂗	𦂘	𦂙	𦂚	𦂛	𦂜	𦂝	𦂞	𦂟
U+260Ax	𦂠	𦂡	𦂢	𦂣	𦂤	𦂥	𦂦	𦂧	𦂨	𦂩	𦂪	𦂫	𦂬	𦂭	𦂮	𦂯
U+260Bx	𦂰	𦂱	𦂲	𦂳	𦂴	𦂵	𦂶	𦂷	𦂸	𦂹	𦂺	𦂻	𦂼	𦂽	𦂾	𦂿
U+260Cx	𦃀	𦃁	𦃂	𦃃	𦃄	𦃅	𦃆	𦃇	𦃈	𦃉	𦃊	𦃋	𦃌	𦃍	𦃎	𦃏
U+260Dx	𦃐	𦃑	𦃒	𦃓	𦃔	𦃕	𦃖	𦃗	𦃘	𦃙	𦃚	𦃛	𦃜	𦃝	𦃞	𦃟
U+260Ex	𦃠	𦃡	𦃢	𦃣	𦃤	𦃥	𦃦	𦃧	𦃨	𦃩	𦃪	𦃫	𦃬	𦃭	𦃮	𦃯
U+260Fx	𦃰	𦃱	𦃲	𦃳	𦃴	𦃵	𦃶	𦃷	𦃸	𦃹	𦃺	𦃻	𦃼	𦃽	𦃾	𦃿
U+2610x	𦄀	𦄁	𦄂	𦄃	𦄄	𦄅	𦄆	𦄇	𦄈	𦄉	𦄊	𦄋	𦄌	𦄍	𦄎	𦄏
U+2611x	𦄐	𦄑	𦄒	𦄓	𦄔	𦄕	𦄖	𦄗	𦄘	𦄙	𦄚	𦄛	𦄜	𦄝	𦄞	𦄟
U+2612x	𦄠	𦄡	𦄢	𦄣	𦄤	𦄥	𦄦	𦄧	𦄨	𦄩	𦄪	𦄫	𦄬	𦄭	𦄮	𦄯
U+2613x	𦄰	𦄱	𦄲	𦄳	𦄴	𦄵	𦄶	𦄷	𦄸	𦄹	𦄺	𦄻	𦄼	𦄽	𦄾	𦄿
U+2614x	𦅀	𦅁	𦅂	𦅃	𦅄	𦅅	𦅆	𦅇	𦅈	𦅉	𦅊	𦅋	𦅌	𦅍	𦅎	𦅏
U+2615x	𦅐	𦅑	𦅒	𦅓	𦅔	𦅕	𦅖	𦅗	𦅘	𦅙	𦅚	𦅛	𦅜	𦅝	𦅞	𦅟
U+2616x	𦅠	𦅡	𦅢	𦅣	𦅤	𦅥	𦅦	𦅧	𦅨	𦅩	𦅪	𦅫	𦅬	𦅭	𦅮	𦅯
U+2617x	𦅰	𦅱	𦅲	𦅳	𦅴	𦅵	𦅶	𦅷	𦅸	𦅹	𦅺	𦅻	𦅼	𦅽	𦅾	𦅿
U+2618x	𦆀	𦆁	𦆂	𦆃	𦆄	𦆅	𦆆	𦆇	𦆈	𦆉	𦆊	𦆋	𦆌	𦆍	𦆎	𦆏
U+2619x	𦆐	𦆑	𦆒	𦆓	𦆔	𦆕	𦆖	𦆗	𦆘	𦆙	𦆚	𦆛	𦆜	𦆝	𦆞	𦆟
U+261Ax	𦆠	𦆡	𦆢	𦆣	𦆤	𦆥	𦆦	𦆧	𦆨	𦆩	𦆪	𦆫	𦆬	𦆭	𦆮	𦆯
U+261Bx	𦆰	𦆱	𦆲	𦆳	𦆴	𦆵	𦆶	𦆷	𦆸	𦆹	𦆺	𦆻	𦆼	𦆽	𦆾	𦆿
U+261Cx	𦇀	𦇁	𦇂	𦇃	𦇄	𦇅	𦇆	𦇇	𦇈	𦇉	𦇊	𦇋	𦇌	𦇍	𦇎	𦇏
U+261Dx	𦇐	𦇑	𦇒	𦇓	𦇔	𦇕	𦇖	𦇗	𦇘	𦇙	𦇚	𦇛	𦇜	𦇝	𦇞	𦇟
U+261Ex	𦇠	𦇡	𦇢	𦇣	𦇤	𦇥	𦇦	𦇧	𦇨	𦇩	𦇪	𦇫	𦇬	𦇭	𦇮	𦇯
U+261Fx	𦇰	𦇱	𦇲	𦇳	𦇴	𦇵	𦇶	𦇷	𦇸	𦇹	𦇺	𦇻	𦇼	𦇽	𦇾	𦇿
U+2620x	𦈀	𦈁	𦈂	𦈃	𦈄	𦈅	𦈆	𦈇	𦈈	𦈉	𦈊	𦈋	𦈌	𦈍	𦈎	𦈏
U+2621x	𦈐	𦈑	𦈒	𦈓	𦈔	𦈕	𦈖	𦈗	𦈘	𦈙	𦈚	𦈛	𦈜	𦈝	𦈞	𦈟
U+2622x	𦈠	𦈡	𦈢	𦈣	𦈤	𦈥	𦈦	𦈧	𦈨	𦈩	𦈪	𦈫	𦈬	𦈭	𦈮	𦈯
U+2623x	𦈰	𦈱	𦈲	𦈳	𦈴	𦈵	𦈶	𦈷	𦈸	𦈹	𦈺	𦈻	𦈼	𦈽	𦈾	𦈿
U+2624x	𦉀	𦉁	𦉂	𦉃	𦉄	𦉅	𦉆	𦉇	𦉈	𦉉	𦉊	𦉋	𦉌	𦉍	𦉎	𦉏
U+2625x	𦉐	𦉑	𦉒	𦉓	𦉔	𦉕	𦉖	𦉗	𦉘	𦉙	𦉚	𦉛	𦉜	𦉝	𦉞	𦉟
U+2626x	𦉠	𦉡	𦉢	𦉣	𦉤	𦉥	𦉦	𦉧	𦉨	𦉩	𦉪	𦉫	𦉬	𦉭	𦉮	𦉯
U+2627x	𦉰	𦉱	𦉲	𦉳	𦉴	𦉵	𦉶	𦉷	𦉸	𦉹	𦉺	𦉻	𦉼	𦉽	𦉾	𦉿
U+2628x	𦊀	𦊁	𦊂	𦊃	𦊄	𦊅	𦊆	𦊇	𦊈	𦊉	𦊊	𦊋	𦊌	𦊍	𦊎	𦊏
U+2629x	𦊐	𦊑	𦊒	𦊓	𦊔	𦊕	𦊖	𦊗	𦊘	𦊙	𦊚	𦊛	𦊜	𦊝	𦊞	𦊟
U+262Ax	𦊠	𦊡	𦊢	𦊣	𦊤	𦊥	𦊦	𦊧	𦊨	𦊩	𦊪	𦊫	𦊬	𦊭	𦊮	𦊯
U+262Bx	𦊰	𦊱	𦊲	𦊳	𦊴	𦊵	𦊶	𦊷	𦊸	𦊹	𦊺	𦊻	𦊼	𦊽	𦊾	𦊿
U+262Cx	𦋀	𦋁	𦋂	𦋃	𦋄	𦋅	𦋆	𦋇	𦋈	𦋉	𦋊	𦋋	𦋌	𦋍	𦋎	𦋏
U+262Dx	𦋐	𦋑	𦋒	𦋓	𦋔	𦋕	𦋖	𦋗	𦋘	𦋙	𦋚	𦋛	𦋜	𦋝	𦋞	𦋟
U+262Ex	𦋠	𦋡	𦋢	𦋣	𦋤	𦋥	𦋦	𦋧	𦋨	𦋩	𦋪	𦋫	𦋬	𦋭	𦋮	𦋯
U+262Fx	𦋰	𦋱	𦋲	𦋳	𦋴	𦋵	𦋶	𦋷	𦋸	𦋹	𦋺	𦋻	𦋼	𦋽	𦋾	𦋿
U+2630x	𦌀	𦌁	𦌂	𦌃	𦌄	𦌅	𦌆	𦌇	𦌈	𦌉	𦌊	𦌋	𦌌	𦌍	𦌎	𦌏
U+2631x	𦌐	𦌑	𦌒	𦌓	𦌔	𦌕	𦌖	𦌗	𦌘	𦌙	𦌚	𦌛	𦌜	𦌝	𦌞	𦌟
U+2632x	𦌠	𦌡	𦌢	𦌣	𦌤	𦌥	𦌦	𦌧	𦌨	𦌩	𦌪	𦌫	𦌬	𦌭	𦌮	𦌯
U+2633x	𦌰	𦌱	𦌲	𦌳	𦌴	𦌵	𦌶	𦌷	𦌸	𦌹	𦌺	𦌻	𦌼	𦌽	𦌾	𦌿
U+2634x	𦍀	𦍁	𦍂	𦍃	𦍄	𦍅	𦍆	𦍇	𦍈	𦍉	𦍊	𦍋	𦍌	𦍍	𦍎	𦍏
U+2635x	𦍐	𦍑	𦍒	𦍓	𦍔	𦍕	𦍖	𦍗	𦍘	𦍙	𦍚	𦍛	𦍜	𦍝	𦍞	𦍟
U+2636x	𦍠	𦍡	𦍢	𦍣	𦍤	𦍥	𦍦	𦍧	𦍨	𦍩	𦍪	𦍫	𦍬	𦍭	𦍮	𦍯
U+2637x	𦍰	𦍱	𦍲	𦍳	𦍴	𦍵	𦍶	𦍷	𦍸	𦍹	𦍺	𦍻	𦍼	𦍽	𦍾	𦍿
U+2638x	𦎀	𦎁	𦎂	𦎃	𦎄	𦎅	𦎆	𦎇	𦎈	𦎉	𦎊	𦎋	𦎌	𦎍	𦎎	𦎏
U+2639x	𦎐	𦎑	𦎒	𦎓	𦎔	𦎕	𦎖	𦎗	𦎘	𦎙	𦎚	𦎛	𦎜	𦎝	𦎞	𦎟
U+263Ax	𦎠	𦎡	𦎢	𦎣	𦎤	𦎥	𦎦	𦎧	𦎨	𦎩	𦎪	𦎫	𦎬	𦎭	𦎮	𦎯
U+263Bx	𦎰	𦎱	𦎲	𦎳	𦎴	𦎵	𦎶	𦎷	𦎸	𦎹	𦎺	𦎻	𦎼	𦎽	𦎾	𦎿
U+263Cx	𦏀	𦏁	𦏂	𦏃	𦏄	𦏅	𦏆	𦏇	𦏈	𦏉	𦏊	𦏋	𦏌	𦏍	𦏎	𦏏
U+263Dx	𦏐	𦏑	𦏒	𦏓	𦏔	𦏕	𦏖	𦏗	𦏘	𦏙	𦏚	𦏛	𦏜	𦏝	𦏞	𦏟
U+263Ex	𦏠	𦏡	𦏢	𦏣	𦏤	𦏥	𦏦	𦏧	𦏨	𦏩	𦏪	𦏫	𦏬	𦏭	𦏮	𦏯
U+263Fx	𦏰	𦏱	𦏲	𦏳	𦏴	𦏵	𦏶	𦏷	𦏸	𦏹	𦏺	𦏻	𦏼	𦏽	𦏾	𦏿
U+2640x	𦐀	𦐁	𦐂	𦐃	𦐄	𦐅	𦐆	𦐇	𦐈	𦐉	𦐊	𦐋	𦐌	𦐍	𦐎	𦐏
U+2641x	𦐐	𦐑	𦐒	𦐓	𦐔	𦐕	𦐖	𦐗	𦐘	𦐙	𦐚	𦐛	𦐜	𦐝	𦐞	𦐟
U+2642x	𦐠	𦐡	𦐢	𦐣	𦐤	𦐥	𦐦	𦐧	𦐨	𦐩	𦐪	𦐫	𦐬	𦐭	𦐮	𦐯
U+2643x	𦐰	𦐱	𦐲	𦐳	𦐴	𦐵	𦐶	𦐷	𦐸	𦐹	𦐺	𦐻	𦐼	𦐽	𦐾	𦐿
U+2644x	𦑀	𦑁	𦑂	𦑃	𦑄	𦑅	𦑆	𦑇	𦑈	𦑉	𦑊	𦑋	𦑌	𦑍	𦑎	𦑏
U+2645x	𦑐	𦑑	𦑒	𦑓	𦑔	𦑕	𦑖	𦑗	𦑘	𦑙	𦑚	𦑛	𦑜	𦑝	𦑞	𦑟
U+2646x	𦑠	𦑡	𦑢	𦑣	𦑤	𦑥	𦑦	𦑧	𦑨	𦑩	𦑪	𦑫	𦑬	𦑭	𦑮	𦑯
U+2647x	𦑰	𦑱	𦑲	𦑳	𦑴	𦑵	𦑶	𦑷	𦑸	𦑹	𦑺	𦑻	𦑼	𦑽	𦑾	𦑿
U+2648x	𦒀	𦒁	𦒂	𦒃	𦒄	𦒅	𦒆	𦒇	𦒈	𦒉	𦒊	𦒋	𦒌	𦒍	𦒎	𦒏
U+2649x	𦒐	𦒑	𦒒	𦒓	𦒔	𦒕	𦒖	𦒗	𦒘	𦒙	𦒚	𦒛	𦒜	𦒝	𦒞	𦒟
U+264Ax	𦒠	𦒡	𦒢	𦒣	𦒤	𦒥	𦒦	𦒧	𦒨	𦒩	𦒪	𦒫	𦒬	𦒭	𦒮	𦒯
U+264Bx	𦒰	𦒱	𦒲	𦒳	𦒴	𦒵	𦒶	𦒷	𦒸	𦒹	𦒺	𦒻	𦒼	𦒽	𦒾	𦒿
U+264Cx	𦓀	𦓁	𦓂	𦓃	𦓄	𦓅	𦓆	𦓇	𦓈	𦓉	𦓊	𦓋	𦓌	𦓍	𦓎	𦓏
U+264Dx	𦓐	𦓑	𦓒	𦓓	𦓔	𦓕	𦓖	𦓗	𦓘	𦓙	𦓚	𦓛	𦓜	𦓝	𦓞	𦓟
U+264Ex	𦓠	𦓡	𦓢	𦓣	𦓤	𦓥	𦓦	𦓧	𦓨	𦓩	𦓪	𦓫	𦓬	𦓭	𦓮	𦓯
U+264Fx	𦓰	𦓱	𦓲	𦓳	𦓴	𦓵	𦓶	𦓷	𦓸	𦓹	𦓺	𦓻	𦓼	𦓽	𦓾	𦓿
U+2650x	𦔀	𦔁	𦔂	𦔃	𦔄	𦔅	𦔆	𦔇	𦔈	𦔉	𦔊	𦔋	𦔌	𦔍	𦔎	𦔏
U+2651x	𦔐	𦔑	𦔒	𦔓	𦔔	𦔕	𦔖	𦔗	𦔘	𦔙	𦔚	𦔛	𦔜	𦔝	𦔞	𦔟
U+2652x	𦔠	𦔡	𦔢	𦔣	𦔤	𦔥	𦔦	𦔧	𦔨	𦔩	𦔪	𦔫	𦔬	𦔭	𦔮	𦔯
U+2653x	𦔰	𦔱	𦔲	𦔳	𦔴	𦔵	𦔶	𦔷	𦔸	𦔹	𦔺	𦔻	𦔼	𦔽	𦔾	𦔿
U+2654x	𦕀	𦕁	𦕂	𦕃	𦕄	𦕅	𦕆	𦕇	𦕈	𦕉	𦕊	𦕋	𦕌	𦕍	𦕎	𦕏
U+2655x	𦕐	𦕑	𦕒	𦕓	𦕔	𦕕	𦕖	𦕗	𦕘	𦕙	𦕚	𦕛	𦕜	𦕝	𦕞	𦕟
U+2656x	𦕠	𦕡	𦕢	𦕣	𦕤	𦕥	𦕦	𦕧	𦕨	𦕩	𦕪	𦕫	𦕬	𦕭	𦕮	𦕯
U+2657x	𦕰	𦕱	𦕲	𦕳	𦕴	𦕵	𦕶	𦕷	𦕸	𦕹	𦕺	𦕻	𦕼	𦕽	𦕾	𦕿
U+2658x	𦖀	𦖁	𦖂	𦖃	𦖄	𦖅	𦖆	𦖇	𦖈	𦖉	𦖊	𦖋	𦖌	𦖍	𦖎	𦖏
U+2659x	𦖐	𦖑	𦖒	𦖓	𦖔	𦖕	𦖖	𦖗	𦖘	𦖙	𦖚	𦖛	𦖜	𦖝	𦖞	𦖟
U+265Ax	𦖠	𦖡	𦖢	𦖣	𦖤	𦖥	𦖦	𦖧	𦖨	𦖩	𦖪	𦖫	𦖬	𦖭	𦖮	𦖯
U+265Bx	𦖰	𦖱	𦖲	𦖳	𦖴	𦖵	𦖶	𦖷	𦖸	𦖹	𦖺	𦖻	𦖼	𦖽	𦖾	𦖿
U+265Cx	𦗀	𦗁	𦗂	𦗃	𦗄	𦗅	𦗆	𦗇	𦗈	𦗉	𦗊	𦗋	𦗌	𦗍	𦗎	𦗏
U+265Dx	𦗐	𦗑	𦗒	𦗓	𦗔	𦗕	𦗖	𦗗	𦗘	𦗙	𦗚	𦗛	𦗜	𦗝	𦗞	𦗟
U+265Ex	𦗠	𦗡	𦗢	𦗣	𦗤	𦗥	𦗦	𦗧	𦗨	𦗩	𦗪	𦗫	𦗬	𦗭	𦗮	𦗯
U+265Fx	𦗰	𦗱	𦗲	𦗳	𦗴	𦗵	𦗶	𦗷	𦗸	𦗹	𦗺	𦗻	𦗼	𦗽	𦗾	𦗿
U+2660x	𦘀	𦘁	𦘂	𦘃	𦘄	𦘅	𦘆	𦘇	𦘈	𦘉	𦘊	𦘋	𦘌	𦘍	𦘎	𦘏
U+2661x	𦘐	𦘑	𦘒	𦘓	𦘔	𦘕	𦘖	𦘗	𦘘	𦘙	𦘚	𦘛	𦘜	𦘝	𦘞	𦘟
U+2662x	𦘠	𦘡	𦘢	𦘣	𦘤	𦘥	𦘦	𦘧	𦘨	𦘩	𦘪	𦘫	𦘬	𦘭	𦘮	𦘯
U+2663x	𦘰	𦘱	𦘲	𦘳	𦘴	𦘵	𦘶	𦘷	𦘸	𦘹	𦘺	𦘻	𦘼	𦘽	𦘾	𦘿
U+2664x	𦙀	𦙁	𦙂	𦙃	𦙄	𦙅	𦙆	𦙇	𦙈	𦙉	𦙊	𦙋	𦙌	𦙍	𦙎	𦙏
U+2665x	𦙐	𦙑	𦙒	𦙓	𦙔	𦙕	𦙖	𦙗	𦙘	𦙙	𦙚	𦙛	𦙜	𦙝	𦙞	𦙟
U+2666x	𦙠	𦙡	𦙢	𦙣	𦙤	𦙥	𦙦	𦙧	𦙨	𦙩	𦙪	𦙫	𦙬	𦙭	𦙮	𦙯
U+2667x	𦙰	𦙱	𦙲	𦙳	𦙴	𦙵	𦙶	𦙷	𦙸	𦙹	𦙺	𦙻	𦙼	𦙽	𦙾	𦙿
U+2668x	𦚀	𦚁	𦚂	𦚃	𦚄	𦚅	𦚆	𦚇	𦚈	𦚉	𦚊	𦚋	𦚌	𦚍	𦚎	𦚏
U+2669x	𦚐	𦚑	𦚒	𦚓	𦚔	𦚕	𦚖	𦚗	𦚘	𦚙	𦚚	𦚛	𦚜	𦚝	𦚞	𦚟
U+266Ax	𦚠	𦚡	𦚢	𦚣	𦚤	𦚥	𦚦	𦚧	𦚨	𦚩	𦚪	𦚫	𦚬	𦚭	𦚮	𦚯
U+266Bx	𦚰	𦚱	𦚲	𦚳	𦚴	𦚵	𦚶	𦚷	𦚸	𦚹	𦚺	𦚻	𦚼	𦚽	𦚾	𦚿
U+266Cx	𦛀	𦛁	𦛂	𦛃	𦛄	𦛅	𦛆	𦛇	𦛈	𦛉	𦛊	𦛋	𦛌	𦛍	𦛎	𦛏
U+266Dx	𦛐	𦛑	𦛒	𦛓	𦛔	𦛕	𦛖	𦛗	𦛘	𦛙	𦛚	𦛛	𦛜	𦛝	𦛞	𦛟
U+266Ex	𦛠	𦛡	𦛢	𦛣	𦛤	𦛥	𦛦	𦛧	𦛨	𦛩	𦛪	𦛫	𦛬	𦛭	𦛮	𦛯
U+266Fx	𦛰	𦛱	𦛲	𦛳	𦛴	𦛵	𦛶	𦛷	𦛸	𦛹	𦛺	𦛻	𦛼	𦛽	𦛾	𦛿
U+2670x	𦜀	𦜁	𦜂	𦜃	𦜄	𦜅	𦜆	𦜇	𦜈	𦜉	𦜊	𦜋	𦜌	𦜍	𦜎	𦜏
U+2671x	𦜐	𦜑	𦜒	𦜓	𦜔	𦜕	𦜖	𦜗	𦜘	𦜙	𦜚	𦜛	𦜜	𦜝	𦜞	𦜟
U+2672x	𦜠	𦜡	𦜢	𦜣	𦜤	𦜥	𦜦	𦜧	𦜨	𦜩	𦜪	𦜫	𦜬	𦜭	𦜮	𦜯
U+2673x	𦜰	𦜱	𦜲	𦜳	𦜴	𦜵	𦜶	𦜷	𦜸	𦜹	𦜺	𦜻	𦜼	𦜽	𦜾	𦜿
U+2674x	𦝀	𦝁	𦝂	𦝃	𦝄	𦝅	𦝆	𦝇	𦝈	𦝉	𦝊	𦝋	𦝌	𦝍	𦝎	𦝏
U+2675x	𦝐	𦝑	𦝒	𦝓	𦝔	𦝕	𦝖	𦝗	𦝘	𦝙	𦝚	𦝛	𦝜	𦝝	𦝞	𦝟
U+2676x	𦝠	𦝡	𦝢	𦝣	𦝤	𦝥	𦝦	𦝧	𦝨	𦝩	𦝪	𦝫	𦝬	𦝭	𦝮	𦝯
U+2677x	𦝰	𦝱	𦝲	𦝳	𦝴	𦝵	𦝶	𦝷	𦝸	𦝹	𦝺	𦝻	𦝼	𦝽	𦝾	𦝿
U+2678x	𦞀	𦞁	𦞂	𦞃	𦞄	𦞅	𦞆	𦞇	𦞈	𦞉	𦞊	𦞋	𦞌	𦞍	𦞎	𦞏
U+2679x	𦞐	𦞑	𦞒	𦞓	𦞔	𦞕	𦞖	𦞗	𦞘	𦞙	𦞚	𦞛	𦞜	𦞝	𦞞	𦞟
U+267Ax	𦞠	𦞡	𦞢	𦞣	𦞤	𦞥	𦞦	𦞧	𦞨	𦞩	𦞪	𦞫	𦞬	𦞭	𦞮	𦞯
U+267Bx	𦞰	𦞱	𦞲	𦞳	𦞴	𦞵	𦞶	𦞷	𦞸	𦞹	𦞺	𦞻	𦞼	𦞽	𦞾	𦞿
U+267Cx	𦟀	𦟁	𦟂	𦟃	𦟄	𦟅	𦟆	𦟇	𦟈	𦟉	𦟊	𦟋	𦟌	𦟍	𦟎	𦟏
U+267Dx	𦟐	𦟑	𦟒	𦟓	𦟔	𦟕	𦟖	𦟗	𦟘	𦟙	𦟚	𦟛	𦟜	𦟝	𦟞	𦟟
U+267Ex	𦟠	𦟡	𦟢	𦟣	𦟤	𦟥	𦟦	𦟧	𦟨	𦟩	𦟪	𦟫	𦟬	𦟭	𦟮	𦟯
U+267Fx	𦟰	𦟱	𦟲	𦟳	𦟴	𦟵	𦟶	𦟷	𦟸	𦟹	𦟺	𦟻	𦟼	𦟽	𦟾	𦟿
U+2680x	𦠀	𦠁	𦠂	𦠃	𦠄	𦠅	𦠆	𦠇	𦠈	𦠉	𦠊	𦠋	𦠌	𦠍	𦠎	𦠏
U+2681x	𦠐	𦠑	𦠒	𦠓	𦠔	𦠕	𦠖	𦠗	𦠘	𦠙	𦠚	𦠛	𦠜	𦠝	𦠞	𦠟
U+2682x	𦠠	𦠡	𦠢	𦠣	𦠤	𦠥	𦠦	𦠧	𦠨	𦠩	𦠪	𦠫	𦠬	𦠭	𦠮	𦠯
U+2683x	𦠰	𦠱	𦠲	𦠳	𦠴	𦠵	𦠶	𦠷	𦠸	𦠹	𦠺	𦠻	𦠼	𦠽	𦠾	𦠿
U+2684x	𦡀	𦡁	𦡂	𦡃	𦡄	𦡅	𦡆	𦡇	𦡈	𦡉	𦡊	𦡋	𦡌	𦡍	𦡎	𦡏
U+2685x	𦡐	𦡑	𦡒	𦡓	𦡔	𦡕	𦡖	𦡗	𦡘	𦡙	𦡚	𦡛	𦡜	𦡝	𦡞	𦡟
U+2686x	𦡠	𦡡	𦡢	𦡣	𦡤	𦡥	𦡦	𦡧	𦡨	𦡩	𦡪	𦡫	𦡬	𦡭	𦡮	𦡯
U+2687x	𦡰	𦡱	𦡲	𦡳	𦡴	𦡵	𦡶	𦡷	𦡸	𦡹	𦡺	𦡻	𦡼	𦡽	𦡾	𦡿
U+2688x	𦢀	𦢁	𦢂	𦢃	𦢄	𦢅	𦢆	𦢇	𦢈	𦢉	𦢊	𦢋	𦢌	𦢍	𦢎	𦢏
U+2689x	𦢐	𦢑	𦢒	𦢓	𦢔	𦢕	𦢖	𦢗	𦢘	𦢙	𦢚	𦢛	𦢜	𦢝	𦢞	𦢟
U+268Ax	𦢠	𦢡	𦢢	𦢣	𦢤	𦢥	𦢦	𦢧	𦢨	𦢩	𦢪	𦢫	𦢬	𦢭	𦢮	𦢯
U+268Bx	𦢰	𦢱	𦢲	𦢳	𦢴	𦢵	𦢶	𦢷	𦢸	𦢹	𦢺	𦢻	𦢼	𦢽	𦢾	𦢿
U+268Cx	𦣀	𦣁	𦣂	𦣃	𦣄	𦣅	𦣆	𦣇	𦣈	𦣉	𦣊	𦣋	𦣌	𦣍	𦣎	𦣏
U+268Dx	𦣐	𦣑	𦣒	𦣓	𦣔	𦣕	𦣖	𦣗	𦣘	𦣙	𦣚	𦣛	𦣜	𦣝	𦣞	𦣟
U+268Ex	𦣠	𦣡	𦣢	𦣣	𦣤	𦣥	𦣦	𦣧	𦣨	𦣩	𦣪	𦣫	𦣬	𦣭	𦣮	𦣯
U+268Fx	𦣰	𦣱	𦣲	𦣳	𦣴	𦣵	𦣶	𦣷	𦣸	𦣹	𦣺	𦣻	𦣼	𦣽	𦣾	𦣿
U+2690x	𦤀	𦤁	𦤂	𦤃	𦤄	𦤅	𦤆	𦤇	𦤈	𦤉	𦤊	𦤋	𦤌	𦤍	𦤎	𦤏
U+2691x	𦤐	𦤑	𦤒	𦤓	𦤔	𦤕	𦤖	𦤗	𦤘	𦤙	𦤚	𦤛	𦤜	𦤝	𦤞	𦤟
U+2692x	𦤠	𦤡	𦤢	𦤣	𦤤	𦤥	𦤦	𦤧	𦤨	𦤩	𦤪	𦤫	𦤬	𦤭	𦤮	𦤯
U+2693x	𦤰	𦤱	𦤲	𦤳	𦤴	𦤵	𦤶	𦤷	𦤸	𦤹	𦤺	𦤻	𦤼	𦤽	𦤾	𦤿
U+2694x	𦥀	𦥁	𦥂	𦥃	𦥄	𦥅	𦥆	𦥇	𦥈	𦥉	𦥊	𦥋	𦥌	𦥍	𦥎	𦥏
U+2695x	𦥐	𦥑	𦥒	𦥓	𦥔	𦥕	𦥖	𦥗	𦥘	𦥙	𦥚	𦥛	𦥜	𦥝	𦥞	𦥟
U+2696x	𦥠	𦥡	𦥢	𦥣	𦥤	𦥥	𦥦	𦥧	𦥨	𦥩	𦥪	𦥫	𦥬	𦥭	𦥮	𦥯
U+2697x	𦥰	𦥱	𦥲	𦥳	𦥴	𦥵	𦥶	𦥷	𦥸	𦥹	𦥺	𦥻	𦥼	𦥽	𦥾	𦥿
U+2698x	𦦀	𦦁	𦦂	𦦃	𦦄	𦦅	𦦆	𦦇	𦦈	𦦉	𦦊	𦦋	𦦌	𦦍	𦦎	𦦏
U+2699x	𦦐	𦦑	𦦒	𦦓	𦦔	𦦕	𦦖	𦦗	𦦘	𦦙	𦦚	𦦛	𦦜	𦦝	𦦞	𦦟
U+269Ax	𦦠	𦦡	𦦢	𦦣	𦦤	𦦥	𦦦	𦦧	𦦨	𦦩	𦦪	𦦫	𦦬	𦦭	𦦮	𦦯
U+269Bx	𦦰	𦦱	𦦲	𦦳	𦦴	𦦵	𦦶	𦦷	𦦸	𦦹	𦦺	𦦻	𦦼	𦦽	𦦾	𦦿
U+269Cx	𦧀	𦧁	𦧂	𦧃	𦧄	𦧅	𦧆	𦧇	𦧈	𦧉	𦧊	𦧋	𦧌	𦧍	𦧎	𦧏
U+269Dx	𦧐	𦧑	𦧒	𦧓	𦧔	𦧕	𦧖	𦧗	𦧘	𦧙	𦧚	𦧛	𦧜	𦧝	𦧞	𦧟
U+269Ex	𦧠	𦧡	𦧢	𦧣	𦧤	𦧥	𦧦	𦧧	𦧨	𦧩	𦧪	𦧫	𦧬	𦧭	𦧮	𦧯
U+269Fx	𦧰	𦧱	𦧲	𦧳	𦧴	𦧵	𦧶	𦧷	𦧸	𦧹	𦧺	𦧻	𦧼	𦧽	𦧾	𦧿
U+26A0x	𦨀	𦨁	𦨂	𦨃	𦨄	𦨅	𦨆	𦨇	𦨈	𦨉	𦨊	𦨋	𦨌	𦨍	𦨎	𦨏
U+26A1x	𦨐	𦨑	𦨒	𦨓	𦨔	𦨕	𦨖	𦨗	𦨘	𦨙	𦨚	𦨛	𦨜	𦨝	𦨞	𦨟
U+26A2x	𦨠	𦨡	𦨢	𦨣	𦨤	𦨥	𦨦	𦨧	𦨨	𦨩	𦨪	𦨫	𦨬	𦨭	𦨮	𦨯
U+26A3x	𦨰	𦨱	𦨲	𦨳	𦨴	𦨵	𦨶	𦨷	𦨸	𦨹	𦨺	𦨻	𦨼	𦨽	𦨾	𦨿
U+26A4x	𦩀	𦩁	𦩂	𦩃	𦩄	𦩅	𦩆	𦩇	𦩈	𦩉	𦩊	𦩋	𦩌	𦩍	𦩎	𦩏
U+26A5x	𦩐	𦩑	𦩒	𦩓	𦩔	𦩕	𦩖	𦩗	𦩘	𦩙	𦩚	𦩛	𦩜	𦩝	𦩞	𦩟
U+26A6x	𦩠	𦩡	𦩢	𦩣	𦩤	𦩥	𦩦	𦩧	𦩨	𦩩	𦩪	𦩫	𦩬	𦩭	𦩮	𦩯
U+26A7x	𦩰	𦩱	𦩲	𦩳	𦩴	𦩵	𦩶	𦩷	𦩸	𦩹	𦩺	𦩻	𦩼	𦩽	𦩾	𦩿
U+26A8x	𦪀	𦪁	𦪂	𦪃	𦪄	𦪅	𦪆	𦪇	𦪈	𦪉	𦪊	𦪋	𦪌	𦪍	𦪎	𦪏
U+26A9x	𦪐	𦪑	𦪒	𦪓	𦪔	𦪕	𦪖	𦪗	𦪘	𦪙	𦪚	𦪛	𦪜	𦪝	𦪞	𦪟
U+26AAx	𦪠	𦪡	𦪢	𦪣	𦪤	𦪥	𦪦	𦪧	𦪨	𦪩	𦪪	𦪫	𦪬	𦪭	𦪮	𦪯
U+26ABx	𦪰	𦪱	𦪲	𦪳	𦪴	𦪵	𦪶	𦪷	𦪸	𦪹	𦪺	𦪻	𦪼	𦪽	𦪾	𦪿
U+26ACx	𦫀	𦫁	𦫂	𦫃	𦫄	𦫅	𦫆	𦫇	𦫈	𦫉	𦫊	𦫋	𦫌	𦫍	𦫎	𦫏
U+26ADx	𦫐	𦫑	𦫒	𦫓	𦫔	𦫕	𦫖	𦫗	𦫘	𦫙	𦫚	𦫛	𦫜	𦫝	𦫞	𦫟
U+26AEx	𦫠	𦫡	𦫢	𦫣	𦫤	𦫥	𦫦	𦫧	𦫨	𦫩	𦫪	𦫫	𦫬	𦫭	𦫮	𦫯
U+26AFx	𦫰	𦫱	𦫲	𦫳	𦫴	𦫵	𦫶	𦫷	𦫸	𦫹	𦫺	𦫻	𦫼	𦫽	𦫾	𦫿
U+26B0x	𦬀	𦬁	𦬂	𦬃	𦬄	𦬅	𦬆	𦬇	𦬈	𦬉	𦬊	𦬋	𦬌	𦬍	𦬎	𦬏
U+26B1x	𦬐	𦬑	𦬒	𦬓	𦬔	𦬕	𦬖	𦬗	𦬘	𦬙	𦬚	𦬛	𦬜	𦬝	𦬞	𦬟
U+26B2x	𦬠	𦬡	𦬢	𦬣	𦬤	𦬥	𦬦	𦬧	𦬨	𦬩	𦬪	𦬫	𦬬	𦬭	𦬮	𦬯
U+26B3x	𦬰	𦬱	𦬲	𦬳	𦬴	𦬵	𦬶	𦬷	𦬸	𦬹	𦬺	𦬻	𦬼	𦬽	𦬾	𦬿
U+26B4x	𦭀	𦭁	𦭂	𦭃	𦭄	𦭅	𦭆	𦭇	𦭈	𦭉	𦭊	𦭋	𦭌	𦭍	𦭎	𦭏
U+26B5x	𦭐	𦭑	𦭒	𦭓	𦭔	𦭕	𦭖	𦭗	𦭘	𦭙	𦭚	𦭛	𦭜	𦭝	𦭞	𦭟
U+26B6x	𦭠	𦭡	𦭢	𦭣	𦭤	𦭥	𦭦	𦭧	𦭨	𦭩	𦭪	𦭫	𦭬	𦭭	𦭮	𦭯
U+26B7x	𦭰	𦭱	𦭲	𦭳	𦭴	𦭵	𦭶	𦭷	𦭸	𦭹	𦭺	𦭻	𦭼	𦭽	𦭾	𦭿
U+26B8x	𦮀	𦮁	𦮂	𦮃	𦮄	𦮅	𦮆	𦮇	𦮈	𦮉	𦮊	𦮋	𦮌	𦮍	𦮎	𦮏
U+26B9x	𦮐	𦮑	𦮒	𦮓	𦮔	𦮕	𦮖	𦮗	𦮘	𦮙	𦮚	𦮛	𦮜	𦮝	𦮞	𦮟
U+26BAx	𦮠	𦮡	𦮢	𦮣	𦮤	𦮥	𦮦	𦮧	𦮨	𦮩	𦮪	𦮫	𦮬	𦮭	𦮮	𦮯
U+26BBx	𦮰	𦮱	𦮲	𦮳	𦮴	𦮵	𦮶	𦮷	𦮸	𦮹	𦮺	𦮻	𦮼	𦮽	𦮾	𦮿
U+26BCx	𦯀	𦯁	𦯂	𦯃	𦯄	𦯅	𦯆	𦯇	𦯈	𦯉	𦯊	𦯋	𦯌	𦯍	𦯎	𦯏
U+26BDx	𦯐	𦯑	𦯒	𦯓	𦯔	𦯕	𦯖	𦯗	𦯘	𦯙	𦯚	𦯛	𦯜	𦯝	𦯞	𦯟
U+26BEx	𦯠	𦯡	𦯢	𦯣	𦯤	𦯥	𦯦	𦯧	𦯨	𦯩	𦯪	𦯫	𦯬	𦯭	𦯮	𦯯
U+26BFx	𦯰	𦯱	𦯲	𦯳	𦯴	𦯵	𦯶	𦯷	𦯸	𦯹	𦯺	𦯻	𦯼	𦯽	𦯾	𦯿
U+26C0x	𦰀	𦰁	𦰂	𦰃	𦰄	𦰅	𦰆	𦰇	𦰈	𦰉	𦰊	𦰋	𦰌	𦰍	𦰎	𦰏
U+26C1x	𦰐	𦰑	𦰒	𦰓	𦰔	𦰕	𦰖	𦰗	𦰘	𦰙	𦰚	𦰛	𦰜	𦰝	𦰞	𦰟
U+26C2x	𦰠	𦰡	𦰢	𦰣	𦰤	𦰥	𦰦	𦰧	𦰨	𦰩	𦰪	𦰫	𦰬	𦰭	𦰮	𦰯
U+26C3x	𦰰	𦰱	𦰲	𦰳	𦰴	𦰵	𦰶	𦰷	𦰸	𦰹	𦰺	𦰻	𦰼	𦰽	𦰾	𦰿
U+26C4x	𦱀	𦱁	𦱂	𦱃	𦱄	𦱅	𦱆	𦱇	𦱈	𦱉	𦱊	𦱋	𦱌	𦱍	𦱎	𦱏
U+26C5x	𦱐	𦱑	𦱒	𦱓	𦱔	𦱕	𦱖	𦱗	𦱘	𦱙	𦱚	𦱛	𦱜	𦱝	𦱞	𦱟
U+26C6x	𦱠	𦱡	𦱢	𦱣	𦱤	𦱥	𦱦	𦱧	𦱨	𦱩	𦱪	𦱫	𦱬	𦱭	𦱮	𦱯
U+26C7x	𦱰	𦱱	𦱲	𦱳	𦱴	𦱵	𦱶	𦱷	𦱸	𦱹	𦱺	𦱻	𦱼	𦱽	𦱾	𦱿
U+26C8x	𦲀	𦲁	𦲂	𦲃	𦲄	𦲅	𦲆	𦲇	𦲈	𦲉	𦲊	𦲋	𦲌	𦲍	𦲎	𦲏
U+26C9x	𦲐	𦲑	𦲒	𦲓	𦲔	𦲕	𦲖	𦲗	𦲘	𦲙	𦲚	𦲛	𦲜	𦲝	𦲞	𦲟
U+26CAx	𦲠	𦲡	𦲢	𦲣	𦲤	𦲥	𦲦	𦲧	𦲨	𦲩	𦲪	𦲫	𦲬	𦲭	𦲮	𦲯
U+26CBx	𦲰	𦲱	𦲲	𦲳	𦲴	𦲵	𦲶	𦲷	𦲸	𦲹	𦲺	𦲻	𦲼	𦲽	𦲾	𦲿
U+26CCx	𦳀	𦳁	𦳂	𦳃	𦳄	𦳅	𦳆	𦳇	𦳈	𦳉	𦳊	𦳋	𦳌	𦳍	𦳎	𦳏
U+26CDx	𦳐	𦳑	𦳒	𦳓	𦳔	𦳕	𦳖	𦳗	𦳘	𦳙	𦳚	𦳛	𦳜	𦳝	𦳞	𦳟
U+26CEx	𦳠	𦳡	𦳢	𦳣	𦳤	𦳥	𦳦	𦳧	𦳨	𦳩	𦳪	𦳫	𦳬	𦳭	𦳮	𦳯
U+26CFx	𦳰	𦳱	𦳲	𦳳	𦳴	𦳵	𦳶	𦳷	𦳸	𦳹	𦳺	𦳻	𦳼	𦳽	𦳾	𦳿
U+26D0x	𦴀	𦴁	𦴂	𦴃	𦴄	𦴅	𦴆	𦴇	𦴈	𦴉	𦴊	𦴋	𦴌	𦴍	𦴎	𦴏
U+26D1x	𦴐	𦴑	𦴒	𦴓	𦴔	𦴕	𦴖	𦴗	𦴘	𦴙	𦴚	𦴛	𦴜	𦴝	𦴞	𦴟
U+26D2x	𦴠	𦴡	𦴢	𦴣	𦴤	𦴥	𦴦	𦴧	𦴨	𦴩	𦴪	𦴫	𦴬	𦴭	𦴮	𦴯
U+26D3x	𦴰	𦴱	𦴲	𦴳	𦴴	𦴵	𦴶	𦴷	𦴸	𦴹	𦴺	𦴻	𦴼	𦴽	𦴾	𦴿
U+26D4x	𦵀	𦵁	𦵂	𦵃	𦵄	𦵅	𦵆	𦵇	𦵈	𦵉	𦵊	𦵋	𦵌	𦵍	𦵎	𦵏
U+26D5x	𦵐	𦵑	𦵒	𦵓	𦵔	𦵕	𦵖	𦵗	𦵘	𦵙	𦵚	𦵛	𦵜	𦵝	𦵞	𦵟
U+26D6x	𦵠	𦵡	𦵢	𦵣	𦵤	𦵥	𦵦	𦵧	𦵨	𦵩	𦵪	𦵫	𦵬	𦵭	𦵮	𦵯
U+26D7x	𦵰	𦵱	𦵲	𦵳	𦵴	𦵵	𦵶	𦵷	𦵸	𦵹	𦵺	𦵻	𦵼	𦵽	𦵾	𦵿
U+26D8x	𦶀	𦶁	𦶂	𦶃	𦶄	𦶅	𦶆	𦶇	𦶈	𦶉	𦶊	𦶋	𦶌	𦶍	𦶎	𦶏
U+26D9x	𦶐	𦶑	𦶒	𦶓	𦶔	𦶕	𦶖	𦶗	𦶘	𦶙	𦶚	𦶛	𦶜	𦶝	𦶞	𦶟
U+26DAx	𦶠	𦶡	𦶢	𦶣	𦶤	𦶥	𦶦	𦶧	𦶨	𦶩	𦶪	𦶫	𦶬	𦶭	𦶮	𦶯
U+26DBx	𦶰	𦶱	𦶲	𦶳	𦶴	𦶵	𦶶	𦶷	𦶸	𦶹	𦶺	𦶻	𦶼	𦶽	𦶾	𦶿
U+26DCx	𦷀	𦷁	𦷂	𦷃	𦷄	𦷅	𦷆	𦷇	𦷈	𦷉	𦷊	𦷋	𦷌	𦷍	𦷎	𦷏
U+26DDx	𦷐	𦷑	𦷒	𦷓	𦷔	𦷕	𦷖	𦷗	𦷘	𦷙	𦷚	𦷛	𦷜	𦷝	𦷞	𦷟
U+26DEx	𦷠	𦷡	𦷢	𦷣	𦷤	𦷥	𦷦	𦷧	𦷨	𦷩	𦷪	𦷫	𦷬	𦷭	𦷮	𦷯
U+26DFx	𦷰	𦷱	𦷲	𦷳	𦷴	𦷵	𦷶	𦷷	𦷸	𦷹	𦷺	𦷻	𦷼	𦷽	𦷾	𦷿
U+26E0x	𦸀	𦸁	𦸂	𦸃	𦸄	𦸅	𦸆	𦸇	𦸈	𦸉	𦸊	𦸋	𦸌	𦸍	𦸎	𦸏
U+26E1x	𦸐	𦸑	𦸒	𦸓	𦸔	𦸕	𦸖	𦸗	𦸘	𦸙	𦸚	𦸛	𦸜	𦸝	𦸞	𦸟
U+26E2x	𦸠	𦸡	𦸢	𦸣	𦸤	𦸥	𦸦	𦸧	𦸨	𦸩	𦸪	𦸫	𦸬	𦸭	𦸮	𦸯
U+26E3x	𦸰	𦸱	𦸲	𦸳	𦸴	𦸵	𦸶	𦸷	𦸸	𦸹	𦸺	𦸻	𦸼	𦸽	𦸾	𦸿
U+26E4x	𦹀	𦹁	𦹂	𦹃	𦹄	𦹅	𦹆	𦹇	𦹈	𦹉	𦹊	𦹋	𦹌	𦹍	𦹎	𦹏
U+26E5x	𦹐	𦹑	𦹒	𦹓	𦹔	𦹕	𦹖	𦹗	𦹘	𦹙	𦹚	𦹛	𦹜	𦹝	𦹞	𦹟
U+26E6x	𦹠	𦹡	𦹢	𦹣	𦹤	𦹥	𦹦	𦹧	𦹨	𦹩	𦹪	𦹫	𦹬	𦹭	𦹮	𦹯
U+26E7x	𦹰	𦹱	𦹲	𦹳	𦹴	𦹵	𦹶	𦹷	𦹸	𦹹	𦹺	𦹻	𦹼	𦹽	𦹾	𦹿
U+26E8x	𦺀	𦺁	𦺂	𦺃	𦺄	𦺅	𦺆	𦺇	𦺈	𦺉	𦺊	𦺋	𦺌	𦺍	𦺎	𦺏
U+26E9x	𦺐	𦺑	𦺒	𦺓	𦺔	𦺕	𦺖	𦺗	𦺘	𦺙	𦺚	𦺛	𦺜	𦺝	𦺞	𦺟
U+26EAx	𦺠	𦺡	𦺢	𦺣	𦺤	𦺥	𦺦	𦺧	𦺨	𦺩	𦺪	𦺫	𦺬	𦺭	𦺮	𦺯
U+26EBx	𦺰	𦺱	𦺲	𦺳	𦺴	𦺵	𦺶	𦺷	𦺸	𦺹	𦺺	𦺻	𦺼	𦺽	𦺾	𦺿
U+26ECx	𦻀	𦻁	𦻂	𦻃	𦻄	𦻅	𦻆	𦻇	𦻈	𦻉	𦻊	𦻋	𦻌	𦻍	𦻎	𦻏
U+26EDx	𦻐	𦻑	𦻒	𦻓	𦻔	𦻕	𦻖	𦻗	𦻘	𦻙	𦻚	𦻛	𦻜	𦻝	𦻞	𦻟
U+26EEx	𦻠	𦻡	𦻢	𦻣	𦻤	𦻥	𦻦	𦻧	𦻨	𦻩	𦻪	𦻫	𦻬	𦻭	𦻮	𦻯
U+26EFx	𦻰	𦻱	𦻲	𦻳	𦻴	𦻵	𦻶	𦻷	𦻸	𦻹	𦻺	𦻻	𦻼	𦻽	𦻾	𦻿
U+26F0x	𦼀	𦼁	𦼂	𦼃	𦼄	𦼅	𦼆	𦼇	𦼈	𦼉	𦼊	𦼋	𦼌	𦼍	𦼎	𦼏
U+26F1x	𦼐	𦼑	𦼒	𦼓	𦼔	𦼕	𦼖	𦼗	𦼘	𦼙	𦼚	𦼛	𦼜	𦼝	𦼞	𦼟
U+26F2x	𦼠	𦼡	𦼢	𦼣	𦼤	𦼥	𦼦	𦼧	𦼨	𦼩	𦼪	𦼫	𦼬	𦼭	𦼮	𦼯
U+26F3x	𦼰	𦼱	𦼲	𦼳	𦼴	𦼵	𦼶	𦼷	𦼸	𦼹	𦼺	𦼻	𦼼	𦼽	𦼾	𦼿
U+26F4x	𦽀	𦽁	𦽂	𦽃	𦽄	𦽅	𦽆	𦽇	𦽈	𦽉	𦽊	𦽋	𦽌	𦽍	𦽎	𦽏
U+26F5x	𦽐	𦽑	𦽒	𦽓	𦽔	𦽕	𦽖	𦽗	𦽘	𦽙	𦽚	𦽛	𦽜	𦽝	𦽞	𦽟
U+26F6x	𦽠	𦽡	𦽢	𦽣	𦽤	𦽥	𦽦	𦽧	𦽨	𦽩	𦽪	𦽫	𦽬	𦽭	𦽮	𦽯
U+26F7x	𦽰	𦽱	𦽲	𦽳	𦽴	𦽵	𦽶	𦽷	𦽸	𦽹	𦽺	𦽻	𦽼	𦽽	𦽾	𦽿
U+26F8x	𦾀	𦾁	𦾂	𦾃	𦾄	𦾅	𦾆	𦾇	𦾈	𦾉	𦾊	𦾋	𦾌	𦾍	𦾎	𦾏
U+26F9x	𦾐	𦾑	𦾒	𦾓	𦾔	𦾕	𦾖	𦾗	𦾘	𦾙	𦾚	𦾛	𦾜	𦾝	𦾞	𦾟
U+26FAx	𦾠	𦾡	𦾢	𦾣	𦾤	𦾥	𦾦	𦾧	𦾨	𦾩	𦾪	𦾫	𦾬	𦾭	𦾮	𦾯
U+26FBx	𦾰	𦾱	𦾲	𦾳	𦾴	𦾵	𦾶	𦾷	𦾸	𦾹	𦾺	𦾻	𦾼	𦾽	𦾾	𦾿
U+26FCx	𦿀	𦿁	𦿂	𦿃	𦿄	𦿅	𦿆	𦿇	𦿈	𦿉	𦿊	𦿋	𦿌	𦿍	𦿎	𦿏
U+26FDx	𦿐	𦿑	𦿒	𦿓	𦿔	𦿕	𦿖	𦿗	𦿘	𦿙	𦿚	𦿛	𦿜	𦿝	𦿞	𦿟
U+26FEx	𦿠	𦿡	𦿢	𦿣	𦿤	𦿥	𦿦	𦿧	𦿨	𦿩	𦿪	𦿫	𦿬	𦿭	𦿮	𦿯
U+26FFx	𦿰	𦿱	𦿲	𦿳	𦿴	𦿵	𦿶	𦿷	𦿸	𦿹	𦿺	𦿻	𦿼	𦿽	𦿾	𦿿
U+2700x	𧀀	𧀁	𧀂	𧀃	𧀄	𧀅	𧀆	𧀇	𧀈	𧀉	𧀊	𧀋	𧀌	𧀍	𧀎	𧀏
U+2701x	𧀐	𧀑	𧀒	𧀓	𧀔	𧀕	𧀖	𧀗	𧀘	𧀙	𧀚	𧀛	𧀜	𧀝	𧀞	𧀟
U+2702x	𧀠	𧀡	𧀢	𧀣	𧀤	𧀥	𧀦	𧀧	𧀨	𧀩	𧀪	𧀫	𧀬	𧀭	𧀮	𧀯
U+2703x	𧀰	𧀱	𧀲	𧀳	𧀴	𧀵	𧀶	𧀷	𧀸	𧀹	𧀺	𧀻	𧀼	𧀽	𧀾	𧀿
U+2704x	𧁀	𧁁	𧁂	𧁃	𧁄	𧁅	𧁆	𧁇	𧁈	𧁉	𧁊	𧁋	𧁌	𧁍	𧁎	𧁏
U+2705x	𧁐	𧁑	𧁒	𧁓	𧁔	𧁕	𧁖	𧁗	𧁘	𧁙	𧁚	𧁛	𧁜	𧁝	𧁞	𧁟
U+2706x	𧁠	𧁡	𧁢	𧁣	𧁤	𧁥	𧁦	𧁧	𧁨	𧁩	𧁪	𧁫	𧁬	𧁭	𧁮	𧁯
U+2707x	𧁰	𧁱	𧁲	𧁳	𧁴	𧁵	𧁶	𧁷	𧁸	𧁹	𧁺	𧁻	𧁼	𧁽	𧁾	𧁿
U+2708x	𧂀	𧂁	𧂂	𧂃	𧂄	𧂅	𧂆	𧂇	𧂈	𧂉	𧂊	𧂋	𧂌	𧂍	𧂎	𧂏
U+2709x	𧂐	𧂑	𧂒	𧂓	𧂔	𧂕	𧂖	𧂗	𧂘	𧂙	𧂚	𧂛	𧂜	𧂝	𧂞	𧂟
U+270Ax	𧂠	𧂡	𧂢	𧂣	𧂤	𧂥	𧂦	𧂧	𧂨	𧂩	𧂪	𧂫	𧂬	𧂭	𧂮	𧂯
U+270Bx	𧂰	𧂱	𧂲	𧂳	𧂴	𧂵	𧂶	𧂷	𧂸	𧂹	𧂺	𧂻	𧂼	𧂽	𧂾	𧂿
U+270Cx	𧃀	𧃁	𧃂	𧃃	𧃄	𧃅	𧃆	𧃇	𧃈	𧃉	𧃊	𧃋	𧃌	𧃍	𧃎	𧃏
U+270Dx	𧃐	𧃑	𧃒	𧃓	𧃔	𧃕	𧃖	𧃗	𧃘	𧃙	𧃚	𧃛	𧃜	𧃝	𧃞	𧃟
U+270Ex	𧃠	𧃡	𧃢	𧃣	𧃤	𧃥	𧃦	𧃧	𧃨	𧃩	𧃪	𧃫	𧃬	𧃭	𧃮	𧃯
U+270Fx	𧃰	𧃱	𧃲	𧃳	𧃴	𧃵	𧃶	𧃷	𧃸	𧃹	𧃺	𧃻	𧃼	𧃽	𧃾	𧃿
U+2710x	𧄀	𧄁	𧄂	𧄃	𧄄	𧄅	𧄆	𧄇	𧄈	𧄉	𧄊	𧄋	𧄌	𧄍	𧄎	𧄏
U+2711x	𧄐	𧄑	𧄒	𧄓	𧄔	𧄕	𧄖	𧄗	𧄘	𧄙	𧄚	𧄛	𧄜	𧄝	𧄞	𧄟
U+2712x	𧄠	𧄡	𧄢	𧄣	𧄤	𧄥	𧄦	𧄧	𧄨	𧄩	𧄪	𧄫	𧄬	𧄭	𧄮	𧄯
U+2713x	𧄰	𧄱	𧄲	𧄳	𧄴	𧄵	𧄶	𧄷	𧄸	𧄹	𧄺	𧄻	𧄼	𧄽	𧄾	𧄿
U+2714x	𧅀	𧅁	𧅂	𧅃	𧅄	𧅅	𧅆	𧅇	𧅈	𧅉	𧅊	𧅋	𧅌	𧅍	𧅎	𧅏
U+2715x	𧅐	𧅑	𧅒	𧅓	𧅔	𧅕	𧅖	𧅗	𧅘	𧅙	𧅚	𧅛	𧅜	𧅝	𧅞	𧅟
U+2716x	𧅠	𧅡	𧅢	𧅣	𧅤	𧅥	𧅦	𧅧	𧅨	𧅩	𧅪	𧅫	𧅬	𧅭	𧅮	𧅯
U+2717x	𧅰	𧅱	𧅲	𧅳	𧅴	𧅵	𧅶	𧅷	𧅸	𧅹	𧅺	𧅻	𧅼	𧅽	𧅾	𧅿
U+2718x	𧆀	𧆁	𧆂	𧆃	𧆄	𧆅	𧆆	𧆇	𧆈	𧆉	𧆊	𧆋	𧆌	𧆍	𧆎	𧆏
U+2719x	𧆐	𧆑	𧆒	𧆓	𧆔	𧆕	𧆖	𧆗	𧆘	𧆙	𧆚	𧆛	𧆜	𧆝	𧆞	𧆟
U+271Ax	𧆠	𧆡	𧆢	𧆣	𧆤	𧆥	𧆦	𧆧	𧆨	𧆩	𧆪	𧆫	𧆬	𧆭	𧆮	𧆯
U+271Bx	𧆰	𧆱	𧆲	𧆳	𧆴	𧆵	𧆶	𧆷	𧆸	𧆹	𧆺	𧆻	𧆼	𧆽	𧆾	𧆿
U+271Cx	𧇀	𧇁	𧇂	𧇃	𧇄	𧇅	𧇆	𧇇	𧇈	𧇉	𧇊	𧇋	𧇌	𧇍	𧇎	𧇏
U+271Dx	𧇐	𧇑	𧇒	𧇓	𧇔	𧇕	𧇖	𧇗	𧇘	𧇙	𧇚	𧇛	𧇜	𧇝	𧇞	𧇟
U+271Ex	𧇠	𧇡	𧇢	𧇣	𧇤	𧇥	𧇦	𧇧	𧇨	𧇩	𧇪	𧇫	𧇬	𧇭	𧇮	𧇯
U+271Fx	𧇰	𧇱	𧇲	𧇳	𧇴	𧇵	𧇶	𧇷	𧇸	𧇹	𧇺	𧇻	𧇼	𧇽	𧇾	𧇿
U+2720x	𧈀	𧈁	𧈂	𧈃	𧈄	𧈅	𧈆	𧈇	𧈈	𧈉	𧈊	𧈋	𧈌	𧈍	𧈎	𧈏
U+2721x	𧈐	𧈑	𧈒	𧈓	𧈔	𧈕	𧈖	𧈗	𧈘	𧈙	𧈚	𧈛	𧈜	𧈝	𧈞	𧈟
U+2722x	𧈠	𧈡	𧈢	𧈣	𧈤	𧈥	𧈦	𧈧	𧈨	𧈩	𧈪	𧈫	𧈬	𧈭	𧈮	𧈯
U+2723x	𧈰	𧈱	𧈲	𧈳	𧈴	𧈵	𧈶	𧈷	𧈸	𧈹	𧈺	𧈻	𧈼	𧈽	𧈾	𧈿
U+2724x	𧉀	𧉁	𧉂	𧉃	𧉄	𧉅	𧉆	𧉇	𧉈	𧉉	𧉊	𧉋	𧉌	𧉍	𧉎	𧉏
U+2725x	𧉐	𧉑	𧉒	𧉓	𧉔	𧉕	𧉖	𧉗	𧉘	𧉙	𧉚	𧉛	𧉜	𧉝	𧉞	𧉟
U+2726x	𧉠	𧉡	𧉢	𧉣	𧉤	𧉥	𧉦	𧉧	𧉨	𧉩	𧉪	𧉫	𧉬	𧉭	𧉮	𧉯
U+2727x	𧉰	𧉱	𧉲	𧉳	𧉴	𧉵	𧉶	𧉷	𧉸	𧉹	𧉺	𧉻	𧉼	𧉽	𧉾	𧉿
U+2728x	𧊀	𧊁	𧊂	𧊃	𧊄	𧊅	𧊆	𧊇	𧊈	𧊉	𧊊	𧊋	𧊌	𧊍	𧊎	𧊏
U+2729x	𧊐	𧊑	𧊒	𧊓	𧊔	𧊕	𧊖	𧊗	𧊘	𧊙	𧊚	𧊛	𧊜	𧊝	𧊞	𧊟
U+272Ax	𧊠	𧊡	𧊢	𧊣	𧊤	𧊥	𧊦	𧊧	𧊨	𧊩	𧊪	𧊫	𧊬	𧊭	𧊮	𧊯
U+272Bx	𧊰	𧊱	𧊲	𧊳	𧊴	𧊵	𧊶	𧊷	𧊸	𧊹	𧊺	𧊻	𧊼	𧊽	𧊾	𧊿
U+272Cx	𧋀	𧋁	𧋂	𧋃	𧋄	𧋅	𧋆	𧋇	𧋈	𧋉	𧋊	𧋋	𧋌	𧋍	𧋎	𧋏
U+272Dx	𧋐	𧋑	𧋒	𧋓	𧋔	𧋕	𧋖	𧋗	𧋘	𧋙	𧋚	𧋛	𧋜	𧋝	𧋞	𧋟
U+272Ex	𧋠	𧋡	𧋢	𧋣	𧋤	𧋥	𧋦	𧋧	𧋨	𧋩	𧋪	𧋫	𧋬	𧋭	𧋮	𧋯
U+272Fx	𧋰	𧋱	𧋲	𧋳	𧋴	𧋵	𧋶	𧋷	𧋸	𧋹	𧋺	𧋻	𧋼	𧋽	𧋾	𧋿
U+2730x	𧌀	𧌁	𧌂	𧌃	𧌄	𧌅	𧌆	𧌇	𧌈	𧌉	𧌊	𧌋	𧌌	𧌍	𧌎	𧌏
U+2731x	𧌐	𧌑	𧌒	𧌓	𧌔	𧌕	𧌖	𧌗	𧌘	𧌙	𧌚	𧌛	𧌜	𧌝	𧌞	𧌟
U+2732x	𧌠	𧌡	𧌢	𧌣	𧌤	𧌥	𧌦	𧌧	𧌨	𧌩	𧌪	𧌫	𧌬	𧌭	𧌮	𧌯
U+2733x	𧌰	𧌱	𧌲	𧌳	𧌴	𧌵	𧌶	𧌷	𧌸	𧌹	𧌺	𧌻	𧌼	𧌽	𧌾	𧌿
U+2734x	𧍀	𧍁	𧍂	𧍃	𧍄	𧍅	𧍆	𧍇	𧍈	𧍉	𧍊	𧍋	𧍌	𧍍	𧍎	𧍏
U+2735x	𧍐	𧍑	𧍒	𧍓	𧍔	𧍕	𧍖	𧍗	𧍘	𧍙	𧍚	𧍛	𧍜	𧍝	𧍞	𧍟
U+2736x	𧍠	𧍡	𧍢	𧍣	𧍤	𧍥	𧍦	𧍧	𧍨	𧍩	𧍪	𧍫	𧍬	𧍭	𧍮	𧍯
U+2737x	𧍰	𧍱	𧍲	𧍳	𧍴	𧍵	𧍶	𧍷	𧍸	𧍹	𧍺	𧍻	𧍼	𧍽	𧍾	𧍿
U+2738x	𧎀	𧎁	𧎂	𧎃	𧎄	𧎅	𧎆	𧎇	𧎈	𧎉	𧎊	𧎋	𧎌	𧎍	𧎎	𧎏
U+2739x	𧎐	𧎑	𧎒	𧎓	𧎔	𧎕	𧎖	𧎗	𧎘	𧎙	𧎚	𧎛	𧎜	𧎝	𧎞	𧎟
U+273Ax	𧎠	𧎡	𧎢	𧎣	𧎤	𧎥	𧎦	𧎧	𧎨	𧎩	𧎪	𧎫	𧎬	𧎭	𧎮	𧎯
U+273Bx	𧎰	𧎱	𧎲	𧎳	𧎴	𧎵	𧎶	𧎷	𧎸	𧎹	𧎺	𧎻	𧎼	𧎽	𧎾	𧎿
U+273Cx	𧏀	𧏁	𧏂	𧏃	𧏄	𧏅	𧏆	𧏇	𧏈	𧏉	𧏊	𧏋	𧏌	𧏍	𧏎	𧏏
U+273Dx	𧏐	𧏑	𧏒	𧏓	𧏔	𧏕	𧏖	𧏗	𧏘	𧏙	𧏚	𧏛	𧏜	𧏝	𧏞	𧏟
U+273Ex	𧏠	𧏡	𧏢	𧏣	𧏤	𧏥	𧏦	𧏧	𧏨	𧏩	𧏪	𧏫	𧏬	𧏭	𧏮	𧏯
U+273Fx	𧏰	𧏱	𧏲	𧏳	𧏴	𧏵	𧏶	𧏷	𧏸	𧏹	𧏺	𧏻	𧏼	𧏽	𧏾	𧏿
U+2740x	𧐀	𧐁	𧐂	𧐃	𧐄	𧐅	𧐆	𧐇	𧐈	𧐉	𧐊	𧐋	𧐌	𧐍	𧐎	𧐏
U+2741x	𧐐	𧐑	𧐒	𧐓	𧐔	𧐕	𧐖	𧐗	𧐘	𧐙	𧐚	𧐛	𧐜	𧐝	𧐞	𧐟
U+2742x	𧐠	𧐡	𧐢	𧐣	𧐤	𧐥	𧐦	𧐧	𧐨	𧐩	𧐪	𧐫	𧐬	𧐭	𧐮	𧐯
U+2743x	𧐰	𧐱	𧐲	𧐳	𧐴	𧐵	𧐶	𧐷	𧐸	𧐹	𧐺	𧐻	𧐼	𧐽	𧐾	𧐿
U+2744x	𧑀	𧑁	𧑂	𧑃	𧑄	𧑅	𧑆	𧑇	𧑈	𧑉	𧑊	𧑋	𧑌	𧑍	𧑎	𧑏
U+2745x	𧑐	𧑑	𧑒	𧑓	𧑔	𧑕	𧑖	𧑗	𧑘	𧑙	𧑚	𧑛	𧑜	𧑝	𧑞	𧑟
U+2746x	𧑠	𧑡	𧑢	𧑣	𧑤	𧑥	𧑦	𧑧	𧑨	𧑩	𧑪	𧑫	𧑬	𧑭	𧑮	𧑯
U+2747x	𧑰	𧑱	𧑲	𧑳	𧑴	𧑵	𧑶	𧑷	𧑸	𧑹	𧑺	𧑻	𧑼	𧑽	𧑾	𧑿
U+2748x	𧒀	𧒁	𧒂	𧒃	𧒄	𧒅	𧒆	𧒇	𧒈	𧒉	𧒊	𧒋	𧒌	𧒍	𧒎	𧒏
U+2749x	𧒐	𧒑	𧒒	𧒓	𧒔	𧒕	𧒖	𧒗	𧒘	𧒙	𧒚	𧒛	𧒜	𧒝	𧒞	𧒟
U+274Ax	𧒠	𧒡	𧒢	𧒣	𧒤	𧒥	𧒦	𧒧	𧒨	𧒩	𧒪	𧒫	𧒬	𧒭	𧒮	𧒯
U+274Bx	𧒰	𧒱	𧒲	𧒳	𧒴	𧒵	𧒶	𧒷	𧒸	𧒹	𧒺	𧒻	𧒼	𧒽	𧒾	𧒿
U+274Cx	𧓀	𧓁	𧓂	𧓃	𧓄	𧓅	𧓆	𧓇	𧓈	𧓉	𧓊	𧓋	𧓌	𧓍	𧓎	𧓏
U+274Dx	𧓐	𧓑	𧓒	𧓓	𧓔	𧓕	𧓖	𧓗	𧓘	𧓙	𧓚	𧓛	𧓜	𧓝	𧓞	𧓟
U+274Ex	𧓠	𧓡	𧓢	𧓣	𧓤	𧓥	𧓦	𧓧	𧓨	𧓩	𧓪	𧓫	𧓬	𧓭	𧓮	𧓯
U+274Fx	𧓰	𧓱	𧓲	𧓳	𧓴	𧓵	𧓶	𧓷	𧓸	𧓹	𧓺	𧓻	𧓼	𧓽	𧓾	𧓿
U+2750x	𧔀	𧔁	𧔂	𧔃	𧔄	𧔅	𧔆	𧔇	𧔈	𧔉	𧔊	𧔋	𧔌	𧔍	𧔎	𧔏
U+2751x	𧔐	𧔑	𧔒	𧔓	𧔔	𧔕	𧔖	𧔗	𧔘	𧔙	𧔚	𧔛	𧔜	𧔝	𧔞	𧔟
U+2752x	𧔠	𧔡	𧔢	𧔣	𧔤	𧔥	𧔦	𧔧	𧔨	𧔩	𧔪	𧔫	𧔬	𧔭	𧔮	𧔯
U+2753x	𧔰	𧔱	𧔲	𧔳	𧔴	𧔵	𧔶	𧔷	𧔸	𧔹	𧔺	𧔻	𧔼	𧔽	𧔾	𧔿
U+2754x	𧕀	𧕁	𧕂	𧕃	𧕄	𧕅	𧕆	𧕇	𧕈	𧕉	𧕊	𧕋	𧕌	𧕍	𧕎	𧕏
U+2755x	𧕐	𧕑	𧕒	𧕓	𧕔	𧕕	𧕖	𧕗	𧕘	𧕙	𧕚	𧕛	𧕜	𧕝	𧕞	𧕟
U+2756x	𧕠	𧕡	𧕢	𧕣	𧕤	𧕥	𧕦	𧕧	𧕨	𧕩	𧕪	𧕫	𧕬	𧕭	𧕮	𧕯
U+2757x	𧕰	𧕱	𧕲	𧕳	𧕴	𧕵	𧕶	𧕷	𧕸	𧕹	𧕺	𧕻	𧕼	𧕽	𧕾	𧕿
U+2758x	𧖀	𧖁	𧖂	𧖃	𧖄	𧖅	𧖆	𧖇	𧖈	𧖉	𧖊	𧖋	𧖌	𧖍	𧖎	𧖏
U+2759x	𧖐	𧖑	𧖒	𧖓	𧖔	𧖕	𧖖	𧖗	𧖘	𧖙	𧖚	𧖛	𧖜	𧖝	𧖞	𧖟
U+275Ax	𧖠	𧖡	𧖢	𧖣	𧖤	𧖥	𧖦	𧖧	𧖨	𧖩	𧖪	𧖫	𧖬	𧖭	𧖮	𧖯
U+275Bx	𧖰	𧖱	𧖲	𧖳	𧖴	𧖵	𧖶	𧖷	𧖸	𧖹	𧖺	𧖻	𧖼	𧖽	𧖾	𧖿
U+275Cx	𧗀	𧗁	𧗂	𧗃	𧗄	𧗅	𧗆	𧗇	𧗈	𧗉	𧗊	𧗋	𧗌	𧗍	𧗎	𧗏
U+275Dx	𧗐	𧗑	𧗒	𧗓	𧗔	𧗕	𧗖	𧗗	𧗘	𧗙	𧗚	𧗛	𧗜	𧗝	𧗞	𧗟
U+275Ex	𧗠	𧗡	𧗢	𧗣	𧗤	𧗥	𧗦	𧗧	𧗨	𧗩	𧗪	𧗫	𧗬	𧗭	𧗮	𧗯
U+275Fx	𧗰	𧗱	𧗲	𧗳	𧗴	𧗵	𧗶	𧗷	𧗸	𧗹	𧗺	𧗻	𧗼	𧗽	𧗾	𧗿
U+2760x	𧘀	𧘁	𧘂	𧘃	𧘄	𧘅	𧘆	𧘇	𧘈	𧘉	𧘊	𧘋	𧘌	𧘍	𧘎	𧘏
U+2761x	𧘐	𧘑	𧘒	𧘓	𧘔	𧘕	𧘖	𧘗	𧘘	𧘙	𧘚	𧘛	𧘜	𧘝	𧘞	𧘟
U+2762x	𧘠	𧘡	𧘢	𧘣	𧘤	𧘥	𧘦	𧘧	𧘨	𧘩	𧘪	𧘫	𧘬	𧘭	𧘮	𧘯
U+2763x	𧘰	𧘱	𧘲	𧘳	𧘴	𧘵	𧘶	𧘷	𧘸	𧘹	𧘺	𧘻	𧘼	𧘽	𧘾	𧘿
U+2764x	𧙀	𧙁	𧙂	𧙃	𧙄	𧙅	𧙆	𧙇	𧙈	𧙉	𧙊	𧙋	𧙌	𧙍	𧙎	𧙏
U+2765x	𧙐	𧙑	𧙒	𧙓	𧙔	𧙕	𧙖	𧙗	𧙘	𧙙	𧙚	𧙛	𧙜	𧙝	𧙞	𧙟
U+2766x	𧙠	𧙡	𧙢	𧙣	𧙤	𧙥	𧙦	𧙧	𧙨	𧙩	𧙪	𧙫	𧙬	𧙭	𧙮	𧙯
U+2767x	𧙰	𧙱	𧙲	𧙳	𧙴	𧙵	𧙶	𧙷	𧙸	𧙹	𧙺	𧙻	𧙼	𧙽	𧙾	𧙿
U+2768x	𧚀	𧚁	𧚂	𧚃	𧚄	𧚅	𧚆	𧚇	𧚈	𧚉	𧚊	𧚋	𧚌	𧚍	𧚎	𧚏
U+2769x	𧚐	𧚑	𧚒	𧚓	𧚔	𧚕	𧚖	𧚗	𧚘	𧚙	𧚚	𧚛	𧚜	𧚝	𧚞	𧚟
U+276Ax	𧚠	𧚡	𧚢	𧚣	𧚤	𧚥	𧚦	𧚧	𧚨	𧚩	𧚪	𧚫	𧚬	𧚭	𧚮	𧚯
U+276Bx	𧚰	𧚱	𧚲	𧚳	𧚴	𧚵	𧚶	𧚷	𧚸	𧚹	𧚺	𧚻	𧚼	𧚽	𧚾	𧚿
U+276Cx	𧛀	𧛁	𧛂	𧛃	𧛄	𧛅	𧛆	𧛇	𧛈	𧛉	𧛊	𧛋	𧛌	𧛍	𧛎	𧛏
U+276Dx	𧛐	𧛑	𧛒	𧛓	𧛔	𧛕	𧛖	𧛗	𧛘	𧛙	𧛚	𧛛	𧛜	𧛝	𧛞	𧛟
U+276Ex	𧛠	𧛡	𧛢	𧛣	𧛤	𧛥	𧛦	𧛧	𧛨	𧛩	𧛪	𧛫	𧛬	𧛭	𧛮	𧛯
U+276Fx	𧛰	𧛱	𧛲	𧛳	𧛴	𧛵	𧛶	𧛷	𧛸	𧛹	𧛺	𧛻	𧛼	𧛽	𧛾	𧛿
U+2770x	𧜀	𧜁	𧜂	𧜃	𧜄	𧜅	𧜆	𧜇	𧜈	𧜉	𧜊	𧜋	𧜌	𧜍	𧜎	𧜏
U+2771x	𧜐	𧜑	𧜒	𧜓	𧜔	𧜕	𧜖	𧜗	𧜘	𧜙	𧜚	𧜛	𧜜	𧜝	𧜞	𧜟
U+2772x	𧜠	𧜡	𧜢	𧜣	𧜤	𧜥	𧜦	𧜧	𧜨	𧜩	𧜪	𧜫	𧜬	𧜭	𧜮	𧜯
U+2773x	𧜰	𧜱	𧜲	𧜳	𧜴	𧜵	𧜶	𧜷	𧜸	𧜹	𧜺	𧜻	𧜼	𧜽	𧜾	𧜿
U+2774x	𧝀	𧝁	𧝂	𧝃	𧝄	𧝅	𧝆	𧝇	𧝈	𧝉	𧝊	𧝋	𧝌	𧝍	𧝎	𧝏
U+2775x	𧝐	𧝑	𧝒	𧝓	𧝔	𧝕	𧝖	𧝗	𧝘	𧝙	𧝚	𧝛	𧝜	𧝝	𧝞	𧝟
U+2776x	𧝠	𧝡	𧝢	𧝣	𧝤	𧝥	𧝦	𧝧	𧝨	𧝩	𧝪	𧝫	𧝬	𧝭	𧝮	𧝯
U+2777x	𧝰	𧝱	𧝲	𧝳	𧝴	𧝵	𧝶	𧝷	𧝸	𧝹	𧝺	𧝻	𧝼	𧝽	𧝾	𧝿
U+2778x	𧞀	𧞁	𧞂	𧞃	𧞄	𧞅	𧞆	𧞇	𧞈	𧞉	𧞊	𧞋	𧞌	𧞍	𧞎	𧞏
U+2779x	𧞐	𧞑	𧞒	𧞓	𧞔	𧞕	𧞖	𧞗	𧞘	𧞙	𧞚	𧞛	𧞜	𧞝	𧞞	𧞟
U+277Ax	𧞠	𧞡	𧞢	𧞣	𧞤	𧞥	𧞦	𧞧	𧞨	𧞩	𧞪	𧞫	𧞬	𧞭	𧞮	𧞯
U+277Bx	𧞰	𧞱	𧞲	𧞳	𧞴	𧞵	𧞶	𧞷	𧞸	𧞹	𧞺	𧞻	𧞼	𧞽	𧞾	𧞿
U+277Cx	𧟀	𧟁	𧟂	𧟃	𧟄	𧟅	𧟆	𧟇	𧟈	𧟉	𧟊	𧟋	𧟌	𧟍	𧟎	𧟏
U+277Dx	𧟐	𧟑	𧟒	𧟓	𧟔	𧟕	𧟖	𧟗	𧟘	𧟙	𧟚	𧟛	𧟜	𧟝	𧟞	𧟟
U+277Ex	𧟠	𧟡	𧟢	𧟣	𧟤	𧟥	𧟦	𧟧	𧟨	𧟩	𧟪	𧟫	𧟬	𧟭	𧟮	𧟯
U+277Fx	𧟰	𧟱	𧟲	𧟳	𧟴	𧟵	𧟶	𧟷	𧟸	𧟹	𧟺	𧟻	𧟼	𧟽	𧟾	𧟿
U+2780x	𧠀	𧠁	𧠂	𧠃	𧠄	𧠅	𧠆	𧠇	𧠈	𧠉	𧠊	𧠋	𧠌	𧠍	𧠎	𧠏
U+2781x	𧠐	𧠑	𧠒	𧠓	𧠔	𧠕	𧠖	𧠗	𧠘	𧠙	𧠚	𧠛	𧠜	𧠝	𧠞	𧠟
U+2782x	𧠠	𧠡	𧠢	𧠣	𧠤	𧠥	𧠦	𧠧	𧠨	𧠩	𧠪	𧠫	𧠬	𧠭	𧠮	𧠯
U+2783x	𧠰	𧠱	𧠲	𧠳	𧠴	𧠵	𧠶	𧠷	𧠸	𧠹	𧠺	𧠻	𧠼	𧠽	𧠾	𧠿
U+2784x	𧡀	𧡁	𧡂	𧡃	𧡄	𧡅	𧡆	𧡇	𧡈	𧡉	𧡊	𧡋	𧡌	𧡍	𧡎	𧡏
U+2785x	𧡐	𧡑	𧡒	𧡓	𧡔	𧡕	𧡖	𧡗	𧡘	𧡙	𧡚	𧡛	𧡜	𧡝	𧡞	𧡟
U+2786x	𧡠	𧡡	𧡢	𧡣	𧡤	𧡥	𧡦	𧡧	𧡨	𧡩	𧡪	𧡫	𧡬	𧡭	𧡮	𧡯
U+2787x	𧡰	𧡱	𧡲	𧡳	𧡴	𧡵	𧡶	𧡷	𧡸	𧡹	𧡺	𧡻	𧡼	𧡽	𧡾	𧡿
U+2788x	𧢀	𧢁	𧢂	𧢃	𧢄	𧢅	𧢆	𧢇	𧢈	𧢉	𧢊	𧢋	𧢌	𧢍	𧢎	𧢏
U+2789x	𧢐	𧢑	𧢒	𧢓	𧢔	𧢕	𧢖	𧢗	𧢘	𧢙	𧢚	𧢛	𧢜	𧢝	𧢞	𧢟
U+278Ax	𧢠	𧢡	𧢢	𧢣	𧢤	𧢥	𧢦	𧢧	𧢨	𧢩	𧢪	𧢫	𧢬	𧢭	𧢮	𧢯
U+278Bx	𧢰	𧢱	𧢲	𧢳	𧢴	𧢵	𧢶	𧢷	𧢸	𧢹	𧢺	𧢻	𧢼	𧢽	𧢾	𧢿
U+278Cx	𧣀	𧣁	𧣂	𧣃	𧣄	𧣅	𧣆	𧣇	𧣈	𧣉	𧣊	𧣋	𧣌	𧣍	𧣎	𧣏
U+278Dx	𧣐	𧣑	𧣒	𧣓	𧣔	𧣕	𧣖	𧣗	𧣘	𧣙	𧣚	𧣛	𧣜	𧣝	𧣞	𧣟
U+278Ex	𧣠	𧣡	𧣢	𧣣	𧣤	𧣥	𧣦	𧣧	𧣨	𧣩	𧣪	𧣫	𧣬	𧣭	𧣮	𧣯
U+278Fx	𧣰	𧣱	𧣲	𧣳	𧣴	𧣵	𧣶	𧣷	𧣸	𧣹	𧣺	𧣻	𧣼	𧣽	𧣾	𧣿
U+2790x	𧤀	𧤁	𧤂	𧤃	𧤄	𧤅	𧤆	𧤇	𧤈	𧤉	𧤊	𧤋	𧤌	𧤍	𧤎	𧤏
U+2791x	𧤐	𧤑	𧤒	𧤓	𧤔	𧤕	𧤖	𧤗	𧤘	𧤙	𧤚	𧤛	𧤜	𧤝	𧤞	𧤟
U+2792x	𧤠	𧤡	𧤢	𧤣	𧤤	𧤥	𧤦	𧤧	𧤨	𧤩	𧤪	𧤫	𧤬	𧤭	𧤮	𧤯
U+2793x	𧤰	𧤱	𧤲	𧤳	𧤴	𧤵	𧤶	𧤷	𧤸	𧤹	𧤺	𧤻	𧤼	𧤽	𧤾	𧤿
U+2794x	𧥀	𧥁	𧥂	𧥃	𧥄	𧥅	𧥆	𧥇	𧥈	𧥉	𧥊	𧥋	𧥌	𧥍	𧥎	𧥏
U+2795x	𧥐	𧥑	𧥒	𧥓	𧥔	𧥕	𧥖	𧥗	𧥘	𧥙	𧥚	𧥛	𧥜	𧥝	𧥞	𧥟
U+2796x	𧥠	𧥡	𧥢	𧥣	𧥤	𧥥	𧥦	𧥧	𧥨	𧥩	𧥪	𧥫	𧥬	𧥭	𧥮	𧥯
U+2797x	𧥰	𧥱	𧥲	𧥳	𧥴	𧥵	𧥶	𧥷	𧥸	𧥹	𧥺	𧥻	𧥼	𧥽	𧥾	𧥿
U+2798x	𧦀	𧦁	𧦂	𧦃	𧦄	𧦅	𧦆	𧦇	𧦈	𧦉	𧦊	𧦋	𧦌	𧦍	𧦎	𧦏
U+2799x	𧦐	𧦑	𧦒	𧦓	𧦔	𧦕	𧦖	𧦗	𧦘	𧦙	𧦚	𧦛	𧦜	𧦝	𧦞	𧦟
U+279Ax	𧦠	𧦡	𧦢	𧦣	𧦤	𧦥	𧦦	𧦧	𧦨	𧦩	𧦪	𧦫	𧦬	𧦭	𧦮	𧦯
U+279Bx	𧦰	𧦱	𧦲	𧦳	𧦴	𧦵	𧦶	𧦷	𧦸	𧦹	𧦺	𧦻	𧦼	𧦽	𧦾	𧦿
U+279Cx	𧧀	𧧁	𧧂	𧧃	𧧄	𧧅	𧧆	𧧇	𧧈	𧧉	𧧊	𧧋	𧧌	𧧍	𧧎	𧧏
U+279Dx	𧧐	𧧑	𧧒	𧧓	𧧔	𧧕	𧧖	𧧗	𧧘	𧧙	𧧚	𧧛	𧧜	𧧝	𧧞	𧧟
U+279Ex	𧧠	𧧡	𧧢	𧧣	𧧤	𧧥	𧧦	𧧧	𧧨	𧧩	𧧪	𧧫	𧧬	𧧭	𧧮	𧧯
U+279Fx	𧧰	𧧱	𧧲	𧧳	𧧴	𧧵	𧧶	𧧷	𧧸	𧧹	𧧺	𧧻	𧧼	𧧽	𧧾	𧧿
U+27A0x	𧨀	𧨁	𧨂	𧨃	𧨄	𧨅	𧨆	𧨇	𧨈	𧨉	𧨊	𧨋	𧨌	𧨍	𧨎	𧨏
U+27A1x	𧨐	𧨑	𧨒	𧨓	𧨔	𧨕	𧨖	𧨗	𧨘	𧨙	𧨚	𧨛	𧨜	𧨝	𧨞	𧨟
U+27A2x	𧨠	𧨡	𧨢	𧨣	𧨤	𧨥	𧨦	𧨧	𧨨	𧨩	𧨪	𧨫	𧨬	𧨭	𧨮	𧨯
U+27A3x	𧨰	𧨱	𧨲	𧨳	𧨴	𧨵	𧨶	𧨷	𧨸	𧨹	𧨺	𧨻	𧨼	𧨽	𧨾	𧨿
U+27A4x	𧩀	𧩁	𧩂	𧩃	𧩄	𧩅	𧩆	𧩇	𧩈	𧩉	𧩊	𧩋	𧩌	𧩍	𧩎	𧩏
U+27A5x	𧩐	𧩑	𧩒	𧩓	𧩔	𧩕	𧩖	𧩗	𧩘	𧩙	𧩚	𧩛	𧩜	𧩝	𧩞	𧩟
U+27A6x	𧩠	𧩡	𧩢	𧩣	𧩤	𧩥	𧩦	𧩧	𧩨	𧩩	𧩪	𧩫	𧩬	𧩭	𧩮	𧩯
U+27A7x	𧩰	𧩱	𧩲	𧩳	𧩴	𧩵	𧩶	𧩷	𧩸	𧩹	𧩺	𧩻	𧩼	𧩽	𧩾	𧩿
U+27A8x	𧪀	𧪁	𧪂	𧪃	𧪄	𧪅	𧪆	𧪇	𧪈	𧪉	𧪊	𧪋	𧪌	𧪍	𧪎	𧪏
U+27A9x	𧪐	𧪑	𧪒	𧪓	𧪔	𧪕	𧪖	𧪗	𧪘	𧪙	𧪚	𧪛	𧪜	𧪝	𧪞	𧪟
U+27AAx	𧪠	𧪡	𧪢	𧪣	𧪤	𧪥	𧪦	𧪧	𧪨	𧪩	𧪪	𧪫	𧪬	𧪭	𧪮	𧪯
U+27ABx	𧪰	𧪱	𧪲	𧪳	𧪴	𧪵	𧪶	𧪷	𧪸	𧪹	𧪺	𧪻	𧪼	𧪽	𧪾	𧪿
U+27ACx	𧫀	𧫁	𧫂	𧫃	𧫄	𧫅	𧫆	𧫇	𧫈	𧫉	𧫊	𧫋	𧫌	𧫍	𧫎	𧫏
U+27ADx	𧫐	𧫑	𧫒	𧫓	𧫔	𧫕	𧫖	𧫗	𧫘	𧫙	𧫚	𧫛	𧫜	𧫝	𧫞	𧫟
U+27AEx	𧫠	𧫡	𧫢	𧫣	𧫤	𧫥	𧫦	𧫧	𧫨	𧫩	𧫪	𧫫	𧫬	𧫭	𧫮	𧫯
U+27AFx	𧫰	𧫱	𧫲	𧫳	𧫴	𧫵	𧫶	𧫷	𧫸	𧫹	𧫺	𧫻	𧫼	𧫽	𧫾	𧫿
U+27B0x	𧬀	𧬁	𧬂	𧬃	𧬄	𧬅	𧬆	𧬇	𧬈	𧬉	𧬊	𧬋	𧬌	𧬍	𧬎	𧬏
U+27B1x	𧬐	𧬑	𧬒	𧬓	𧬔	𧬕	𧬖	𧬗	𧬘	𧬙	𧬚	𧬛	𧬜	𧬝	𧬞	𧬟
U+27B2x	𧬠	𧬡	𧬢	𧬣	𧬤	𧬥	𧬦	𧬧	𧬨	𧬩	𧬪	𧬫	𧬬	𧬭	𧬮	𧬯
U+27B3x	𧬰	𧬱	𧬲	𧬳	𧬴	𧬵	𧬶	𧬷	𧬸	𧬹	𧬺	𧬻	𧬼	𧬽	𧬾	𧬿
U+27B4x	𧭀	𧭁	𧭂	𧭃	𧭄	𧭅	𧭆	𧭇	𧭈	𧭉	𧭊	𧭋	𧭌	𧭍	𧭎	𧭏
U+27B5x	𧭐	𧭑	𧭒	𧭓	𧭔	𧭕	𧭖	𧭗	𧭘	𧭙	𧭚	𧭛	𧭜	𧭝	𧭞	𧭟
U+27B6x	𧭠	𧭡	𧭢	𧭣	𧭤	𧭥	𧭦	𧭧	𧭨	𧭩	𧭪	𧭫	𧭬	𧭭	𧭮	𧭯
U+27B7x	𧭰	𧭱	𧭲	𧭳	𧭴	𧭵	𧭶	𧭷	𧭸	𧭹	𧭺	𧭻	𧭼	𧭽	𧭾	𧭿
U+27B8x	𧮀	𧮁	𧮂	𧮃	𧮄	𧮅	𧮆	𧮇	𧮈	𧮉	𧮊	𧮋	𧮌	𧮍	𧮎	𧮏
U+27B9x	𧮐	𧮑	𧮒	𧮓	𧮔	𧮕	𧮖	𧮗	𧮘	𧮙	𧮚	𧮛	𧮜	𧮝	𧮞	𧮟
U+27BAx	𧮠	𧮡	𧮢	𧮣	𧮤	𧮥	𧮦	𧮧	𧮨	𧮩	𧮪	𧮫	𧮬	𧮭	𧮮	𧮯
U+27BBx	𧮰	𧮱	𧮲	𧮳	𧮴	𧮵	𧮶	𧮷	𧮸	𧮹	𧮺	𧮻	𧮼	𧮽	𧮾	𧮿
U+27BCx	𧯀	𧯁	𧯂	𧯃	𧯄	𧯅	𧯆	𧯇	𧯈	𧯉	𧯊	𧯋	𧯌	𧯍	𧯎	𧯏
U+27BDx	𧯐	𧯑	𧯒	𧯓	𧯔	𧯕	𧯖	𧯗	𧯘	𧯙	𧯚	𧯛	𧯜	𧯝	𧯞	𧯟
U+27BEx	𧯠	𧯡	𧯢	𧯣	𧯤	𧯥	𧯦	𧯧	𧯨	𧯩	𧯪	𧯫	𧯬	𧯭	𧯮	𧯯
U+27BFx	𧯰	𧯱	𧯲	𧯳	𧯴	𧯵	𧯶	𧯷	𧯸	𧯹	𧯺	𧯻	𧯼	𧯽	𧯾	𧯿
U+27C0x	𧰀	𧰁	𧰂	𧰃	𧰄	𧰅	𧰆	𧰇	𧰈	𧰉	𧰊	𧰋	𧰌	𧰍	𧰎	𧰏
U+27C1x	𧰐	𧰑	𧰒	𧰓	𧰔	𧰕	𧰖	𧰗	𧰘	𧰙	𧰚	𧰛	𧰜	𧰝	𧰞	𧰟
U+27C2x	𧰠	𧰡	𧰢	𧰣	𧰤	𧰥	𧰦	𧰧	𧰨	𧰩	𧰪	𧰫	𧰬	𧰭	𧰮	𧰯
U+27C3x	𧰰	𧰱	𧰲	𧰳	𧰴	𧰵	𧰶	𧰷	𧰸	𧰹	𧰺	𧰻	𧰼	𧰽	𧰾	𧰿
U+27C4x	𧱀	𧱁	𧱂	𧱃	𧱄	𧱅	𧱆	𧱇	𧱈	𧱉	𧱊	𧱋	𧱌	𧱍	𧱎	𧱏
U+27C5x	𧱐	𧱑	𧱒	𧱓	𧱔	𧱕	𧱖	𧱗	𧱘	𧱙	𧱚	𧱛	𧱜	𧱝	𧱞	𧱟
U+27C6x	𧱠	𧱡	𧱢	𧱣	𧱤	𧱥	𧱦	𧱧	𧱨	𧱩	𧱪	𧱫	𧱬	𧱭	𧱮	𧱯
U+27C7x	𧱰	𧱱	𧱲	𧱳	𧱴	𧱵	𧱶	𧱷	𧱸	𧱹	𧱺	𧱻	𧱼	𧱽	𧱾	𧱿
U+27C8x	𧲀	𧲁	𧲂	𧲃	𧲄	𧲅	𧲆	𧲇	𧲈	𧲉	𧲊	𧲋	𧲌	𧲍	𧲎	𧲏
U+27C9x	𧲐	𧲑	𧲒	𧲓	𧲔	𧲕	𧲖	𧲗	𧲘	𧲙	𧲚	𧲛	𧲜	𧲝	𧲞	𧲟
U+27CAx	𧲠	𧲡	𧲢	𧲣	𧲤	𧲥	𧲦	𧲧	𧲨	𧲩	𧲪	𧲫	𧲬	𧲭	𧲮	𧲯
U+27CBx	𧲰	𧲱	𧲲	𧲳	𧲴	𧲵	𧲶	𧲷	𧲸	𧲹	𧲺	𧲻	𧲼	𧲽	𧲾	𧲿
U+27CCx	𧳀	𧳁	𧳂	𧳃	𧳄	𧳅	𧳆	𧳇	𧳈	𧳉	𧳊	𧳋	𧳌	𧳍	𧳎	𧳏
U+27CDx	𧳐	𧳑	𧳒	𧳓	𧳔	𧳕	𧳖	𧳗	𧳘	𧳙	𧳚	𧳛	𧳜	𧳝	𧳞	𧳟
U+27CEx	𧳠	𧳡	𧳢	𧳣	𧳤	𧳥	𧳦	𧳧	𧳨	𧳩	𧳪	𧳫	𧳬	𧳭	𧳮	𧳯
U+27CFx	𧳰	𧳱	𧳲	𧳳	𧳴	𧳵	𧳶	𧳷	𧳸	𧳹	𧳺	𧳻	𧳼	𧳽	𧳾	𧳿
U+27D0x	𧴀	𧴁	𧴂	𧴃	𧴄	𧴅	𧴆	𧴇	𧴈	𧴉	𧴊	𧴋	𧴌	𧴍	𧴎	𧴏
U+27D1x	𧴐	𧴑	𧴒	𧴓	𧴔	𧴕	𧴖	𧴗	𧴘	𧴙	𧴚	𧴛	𧴜	𧴝	𧴞	𧴟
U+27D2x	𧴠	𧴡	𧴢	𧴣	𧴤	𧴥	𧴦	𧴧	𧴨	𧴩	𧴪	𧴫	𧴬	𧴭	𧴮	𧴯
U+27D3x	𧴰	𧴱	𧴲	𧴳	𧴴	𧴵	𧴶	𧴷	𧴸	𧴹	𧴺	𧴻	𧴼	𧴽	𧴾	𧴿
U+27D4x	𧵀	𧵁	𧵂	𧵃	𧵄	𧵅	𧵆	𧵇	𧵈	𧵉	𧵊	𧵋	𧵌	𧵍	𧵎	𧵏
U+27D5x	𧵐	𧵑	𧵒	𧵓	𧵔	𧵕	𧵖	𧵗	𧵘	𧵙	𧵚	𧵛	𧵜	𧵝	𧵞	𧵟
U+27D6x	𧵠	𧵡	𧵢	𧵣	𧵤	𧵥	𧵦	𧵧	𧵨	𧵩	𧵪	𧵫	𧵬	𧵭	𧵮	𧵯
U+27D7x	𧵰	𧵱	𧵲	𧵳	𧵴	𧵵	𧵶	𧵷	𧵸	𧵹	𧵺	𧵻	𧵼	𧵽	𧵾	𧵿
U+27D8x	𧶀	𧶁	𧶂	𧶃	𧶄	𧶅	𧶆	𧶇	𧶈	𧶉	𧶊	𧶋	𧶌	𧶍	𧶎	𧶏
U+27D9x	𧶐	𧶑	𧶒	𧶓	𧶔	𧶕	𧶖	𧶗	𧶘	𧶙	𧶚	𧶛	𧶜	𧶝	𧶞	𧶟
U+27DAx	𧶠	𧶡	𧶢	𧶣	𧶤	𧶥	𧶦	𧶧	𧶨	𧶩	𧶪	𧶫	𧶬	𧶭	𧶮	𧶯
U+27DBx	𧶰	𧶱	𧶲	𧶳	𧶴	𧶵	𧶶	𧶷	𧶸	𧶹	𧶺	𧶻	𧶼	𧶽	𧶾	𧶿
U+27DCx	𧷀	𧷁	𧷂	𧷃	𧷄	𧷅	𧷆	𧷇	𧷈	𧷉	𧷊	𧷋	𧷌	𧷍	𧷎	𧷏
U+27DDx	𧷐	𧷑	𧷒	𧷓	𧷔	𧷕	𧷖	𧷗	𧷘	𧷙	𧷚	𧷛	𧷜	𧷝	𧷞	𧷟
U+27DEx	𧷠	𧷡	𧷢	𧷣	𧷤	𧷥	𧷦	𧷧	𧷨	𧷩	𧷪	𧷫	𧷬	𧷭	𧷮	𧷯
U+27DFx	𧷰	𧷱	𧷲	𧷳	𧷴	𧷵	𧷶	𧷷	𧷸	𧷹	𧷺	𧷻	𧷼	𧷽	𧷾	𧷿
U+27E0x	𧸀	𧸁	𧸂	𧸃	𧸄	𧸅	𧸆	𧸇	𧸈	𧸉	𧸊	𧸋	𧸌	𧸍	𧸎	𧸏
U+27E1x	𧸐	𧸑	𧸒	𧸓	𧸔	𧸕	𧸖	𧸗	𧸘	𧸙	𧸚	𧸛	𧸜	𧸝	𧸞	𧸟
U+27E2x	𧸠	𧸡	𧸢	𧸣	𧸤	𧸥	𧸦	𧸧	𧸨	𧸩	𧸪	𧸫	𧸬	𧸭	𧸮	𧸯
U+27E3x	𧸰	𧸱	𧸲	𧸳	𧸴	𧸵	𧸶	𧸷	𧸸	𧸹	𧸺	𧸻	𧸼	𧸽	𧸾	𧸿
U+27E4x	𧹀	𧹁	𧹂	𧹃	𧹄	𧹅	𧹆	𧹇	𧹈	𧹉	𧹊	𧹋	𧹌	𧹍	𧹎	𧹏
U+27E5x	𧹐	𧹑	𧹒	𧹓	𧹔	𧹕	𧹖	𧹗	𧹘	𧹙	𧹚	𧹛	𧹜	𧹝	𧹞	𧹟
U+27E6x	𧹠	𧹡	𧹢	𧹣	𧹤	𧹥	𧹦	𧹧	𧹨	𧹩	𧹪	𧹫	𧹬	𧹭	𧹮	𧹯
U+27E7x	𧹰	𧹱	𧹲	𧹳	𧹴	𧹵	𧹶	𧹷	𧹸	𧹹	𧹺	𧹻	𧹼	𧹽	𧹾	𧹿
U+27E8x	𧺀	𧺁	𧺂	𧺃	𧺄	𧺅	𧺆	𧺇	𧺈	𧺉	𧺊	𧺋	𧺌	𧺍	𧺎	𧺏
U+27E9x	𧺐	𧺑	𧺒	𧺓	𧺔	𧺕	𧺖	𧺗	𧺘	𧺙	𧺚	𧺛	𧺜	𧺝	𧺞	𧺟
U+27EAx	𧺠	𧺡	𧺢	𧺣	𧺤	𧺥	𧺦	𧺧	𧺨	𧺩	𧺪	𧺫	𧺬	𧺭	𧺮	𧺯
U+27EBx	𧺰	𧺱	𧺲	𧺳	𧺴	𧺵	𧺶	𧺷	𧺸	𧺹	𧺺	𧺻	𧺼	𧺽	𧺾	𧺿
U+27ECx	𧻀	𧻁	𧻂	𧻃	𧻄	𧻅	𧻆	𧻇	𧻈	𧻉	𧻊	𧻋	𧻌	𧻍	𧻎	𧻏
U+27EDx	𧻐	𧻑	𧻒	𧻓	𧻔	𧻕	𧻖	𧻗	𧻘	𧻙	𧻚	𧻛	𧻜	𧻝	𧻞	𧻟
U+27EEx	𧻠	𧻡	𧻢	𧻣	𧻤	𧻥	𧻦	𧻧	𧻨	𧻩	𧻪	𧻫	𧻬	𧻭	𧻮	𧻯
U+27EFx	𧻰	𧻱	𧻲	𧻳	𧻴	𧻵	𧻶	𧻷	𧻸	𧻹	𧻺	𧻻	𧻼	𧻽	𧻾	𧻿
U+27F0x	𧼀	𧼁	𧼂	𧼃	𧼄	𧼅	𧼆	𧼇	𧼈	𧼉	𧼊	𧼋	𧼌	𧼍	𧼎	𧼏
U+27F1x	𧼐	𧼑	𧼒	𧼓	𧼔	𧼕	𧼖	𧼗	𧼘	𧼙	𧼚	𧼛	𧼜	𧼝	𧼞	𧼟
U+27F2x	𧼠	𧼡	𧼢	𧼣	𧼤	𧼥	𧼦	𧼧	𧼨	𧼩	𧼪	𧼫	𧼬	𧼭	𧼮	𧼯
U+27F3x	𧼰	𧼱	𧼲	𧼳	𧼴	𧼵	𧼶	𧼷	𧼸	𧼹	𧼺	𧼻	𧼼	𧼽	𧼾	𧼿
U+27F4x	𧽀	𧽁	𧽂	𧽃	𧽄	𧽅	𧽆	𧽇	𧽈	𧽉	𧽊	𧽋	𧽌	𧽍	𧽎	𧽏
U+27F5x	𧽐	𧽑	𧽒	𧽓	𧽔	𧽕	𧽖	𧽗	𧽘	𧽙	𧽚	𧽛	𧽜	𧽝	𧽞	𧽟
U+27F6x	𧽠	𧽡	𧽢	𧽣	𧽤	𧽥	𧽦	𧽧	𧽨	𧽩	𧽪	𧽫	𧽬	𧽭	𧽮	𧽯
U+27F7x	𧽰	𧽱	𧽲	𧽳	𧽴	𧽵	𧽶	𧽷	𧽸	𧽹	𧽺	𧽻	𧽼	𧽽	𧽾	𧽿
U+27F8x	𧾀	𧾁	𧾂	𧾃	𧾄	𧾅	𧾆	𧾇	𧾈	𧾉	𧾊	𧾋	𧾌	𧾍	𧾎	𧾏
U+27F9x	𧾐	𧾑	𧾒	𧾓	𧾔	𧾕	𧾖	𧾗	𧾘	𧾙	𧾚	𧾛	𧾜	𧾝	𧾞	𧾟
U+27FAx	𧾠	𧾡	𧾢	𧾣	𧾤	𧾥	𧾦	𧾧	𧾨	𧾩	𧾪	𧾫	𧾬	𧾭	𧾮	𧾯
U+27FBx	𧾰	𧾱	𧾲	𧾳	𧾴	𧾵	𧾶	𧾷	𧾸	𧾹	𧾺	𧾻	𧾼	𧾽	𧾾	𧾿
U+27FCx	𧿀	𧿁	𧿂	𧿃	𧿄	𧿅	𧿆	𧿇	𧿈	𧿉	𧿊	𧿋	𧿌	𧿍	𧿎	𧿏
U+27FDx	𧿐	𧿑	𧿒	𧿓	𧿔	𧿕	𧿖	𧿗	𧿘	𧿙	𧿚	𧿛	𧿜	𧿝	𧿞	𧿟
U+27FEx	𧿠	𧿡	𧿢	𧿣	𧿤	𧿥	𧿦	𧿧	𧿨	𧿩	𧿪	𧿫	𧿬	𧿭	𧿮	𧿯
U+27FFx	𧿰	𧿱	𧿲	𧿳	𧿴	𧿵	𧿶	𧿷	𧿸	𧿹	𧿺	𧿻	𧿼	𧿽	𧿾	𧿿
U+2800x	𨀀	𨀁	𨀂	𨀃	𨀄	𨀅	𨀆	𨀇	𨀈	𨀉	𨀊	𨀋	𨀌	𨀍	𨀎	𨀏
U+2801x	𨀐	𨀑	𨀒	𨀓	𨀔	𨀕	𨀖	𨀗	𨀘	𨀙	𨀚	𨀛	𨀜	𨀝	𨀞	𨀟
U+2802x	𨀠	𨀡	𨀢	𨀣	𨀤	𨀥	𨀦	𨀧	𨀨	𨀩	𨀪	𨀫	𨀬	𨀭	𨀮	𨀯
U+2803x	𨀰	𨀱	𨀲	𨀳	𨀴	𨀵	𨀶	𨀷	𨀸	𨀹	𨀺	𨀻	𨀼	𨀽	𨀾	𨀿
U+2804x	𨁀	𨁁	𨁂	𨁃	𨁄	𨁅	𨁆	𨁇	𨁈	𨁉	𨁊	𨁋	𨁌	𨁍	𨁎	𨁏
U+2805x	𨁐	𨁑	𨁒	𨁓	𨁔	𨁕	𨁖	𨁗	𨁘	𨁙	𨁚	𨁛	𨁜	𨁝	𨁞	𨁟
U+2806x	𨁠	𨁡	𨁢	𨁣	𨁤	𨁥	𨁦	𨁧	𨁨	𨁩	𨁪	𨁫	𨁬	𨁭	𨁮	𨁯
U+2807x	𨁰	𨁱	𨁲	𨁳	𨁴	𨁵	𨁶	𨁷	𨁸	𨁹	𨁺	𨁻	𨁼	𨁽	𨁾	𨁿
U+2808x	𨂀	𨂁	𨂂	𨂃	𨂄	𨂅	𨂆	𨂇	𨂈	𨂉	𨂊	𨂋	𨂌	𨂍	𨂎	𨂏
U+2809x	𨂐	𨂑	𨂒	𨂓	𨂔	𨂕	𨂖	𨂗	𨂘	𨂙	𨂚	𨂛	𨂜	𨂝	𨂞	𨂟
U+280Ax	𨂠	𨂡	𨂢	𨂣	𨂤	𨂥	𨂦	𨂧	𨂨	𨂩	𨂪	𨂫	𨂬	𨂭	𨂮	𨂯
U+280Bx	𨂰	𨂱	𨂲	𨂳	𨂴	𨂵	𨂶	𨂷	𨂸	𨂹	𨂺	𨂻	𨂼	𨂽	𨂾	𨂿
U+280Cx	𨃀	𨃁	𨃂	𨃃	𨃄	𨃅	𨃆	𨃇	𨃈	𨃉	𨃊	𨃋	𨃌	𨃍	𨃎	𨃏
U+280Dx	𨃐	𨃑	𨃒	𨃓	𨃔	𨃕	𨃖	𨃗	𨃘	𨃙	𨃚	𨃛	𨃜	𨃝	𨃞	𨃟
U+280Ex	𨃠	𨃡	𨃢	𨃣	𨃤	𨃥	𨃦	𨃧	𨃨	𨃩	𨃪	𨃫	𨃬	𨃭	𨃮	𨃯
U+280Fx	𨃰	𨃱	𨃲	𨃳	𨃴	𨃵	𨃶	𨃷	𨃸	𨃹	𨃺	𨃻	𨃼	𨃽	𨃾	𨃿
U+2810x	𨄀	𨄁	𨄂	𨄃	𨄄	𨄅	𨄆	𨄇	𨄈	𨄉	𨄊	𨄋	𨄌	𨄍	𨄎	𨄏
U+2811x	𨄐	𨄑	𨄒	𨄓	𨄔	𨄕	𨄖	𨄗	𨄘	𨄙	𨄚	𨄛	𨄜	𨄝	𨄞	𨄟
U+2812x	𨄠	𨄡	𨄢	𨄣	𨄤	𨄥	𨄦	𨄧	𨄨	𨄩	𨄪	𨄫	𨄬	𨄭	𨄮	𨄯
U+2813x	𨄰	𨄱	𨄲	𨄳	𨄴	𨄵	𨄶	𨄷	𨄸	𨄹	𨄺	𨄻	𨄼	𨄽	𨄾	𨄿
U+2814x	𨅀	𨅁	𨅂	𨅃	𨅄	𨅅	𨅆	𨅇	𨅈	𨅉	𨅊	𨅋	𨅌	𨅍	𨅎	𨅏
U+2815x	𨅐	𨅑	𨅒	𨅓	𨅔	𨅕	𨅖	𨅗	𨅘	𨅙	𨅚	𨅛	𨅜	𨅝	𨅞	𨅟
U+2816x	𨅠	𨅡	𨅢	𨅣	𨅤	𨅥	𨅦	𨅧	𨅨	𨅩	𨅪	𨅫	𨅬	𨅭	𨅮	𨅯
U+2817x	𨅰	𨅱	𨅲	𨅳	𨅴	𨅵	𨅶	𨅷	𨅸	𨅹	𨅺	𨅻	𨅼	𨅽	𨅾	𨅿
U+2818x	𨆀	𨆁	𨆂	𨆃	𨆄	𨆅	𨆆	𨆇	𨆈	𨆉	𨆊	𨆋	𨆌	𨆍	𨆎	𨆏
U+2819x	𨆐	𨆑	𨆒	𨆓	𨆔	𨆕	𨆖	𨆗	𨆘	𨆙	𨆚	𨆛	𨆜	𨆝	𨆞	𨆟
U+281Ax	𨆠	𨆡	𨆢	𨆣	𨆤	𨆥	𨆦	𨆧	𨆨	𨆩	𨆪	𨆫	𨆬	𨆭	𨆮	𨆯
U+281Bx	𨆰	𨆱	𨆲	𨆳	𨆴	𨆵	𨆶	𨆷	𨆸	𨆹	𨆺	𨆻	𨆼	𨆽	𨆾	𨆿
U+281Cx	𨇀	𨇁	𨇂	𨇃	𨇄	𨇅	𨇆	𨇇	𨇈	𨇉	𨇊	𨇋	𨇌	𨇍	𨇎	𨇏
U+281Dx	𨇐	𨇑	𨇒	𨇓	𨇔	𨇕	𨇖	𨇗	𨇘	𨇙	𨇚	𨇛	𨇜	𨇝	𨇞	𨇟
U+281Ex	𨇠	𨇡	𨇢	𨇣	𨇤	𨇥	𨇦	𨇧	𨇨	𨇩	𨇪	𨇫	𨇬	𨇭	𨇮	𨇯
U+281Fx	𨇰	𨇱	𨇲	𨇳	𨇴	𨇵	𨇶	𨇷	𨇸	𨇹	𨇺	𨇻	𨇼	𨇽	𨇾	𨇿
U+2820x	𨈀	𨈁	𨈂	𨈃	𨈄	𨈅	𨈆	𨈇	𨈈	𨈉	𨈊	𨈋	𨈌	𨈍	𨈎	𨈏
U+2821x	𨈐	𨈑	𨈒	𨈓	𨈔	𨈕	𨈖	𨈗	𨈘	𨈙	𨈚	𨈛	𨈜	𨈝	𨈞	𨈟
U+2822x	𨈠	𨈡	𨈢	𨈣	𨈤	𨈥	𨈦	𨈧	𨈨	𨈩	𨈪	𨈫	𨈬	𨈭	𨈮	𨈯
U+2823x	𨈰	𨈱	𨈲	𨈳	𨈴	𨈵	𨈶	𨈷	𨈸	𨈹	𨈺	𨈻	𨈼	𨈽	𨈾	𨈿
U+2824x	𨉀	𨉁	𨉂	𨉃	𨉄	𨉅	𨉆	𨉇	𨉈	𨉉	𨉊	𨉋	𨉌	𨉍	𨉎	𨉏
U+2825x	𨉐	𨉑	𨉒	𨉓	𨉔	𨉕	𨉖	𨉗	𨉘	𨉙	𨉚	𨉛	𨉜	𨉝	𨉞	𨉟
U+2826x	𨉠	𨉡	𨉢	𨉣	𨉤	𨉥	𨉦	𨉧	𨉨	𨉩	𨉪	𨉫	𨉬	𨉭	𨉮	𨉯
U+2827x	𨉰	𨉱	𨉲	𨉳	𨉴	𨉵	𨉶	𨉷	𨉸	𨉹	𨉺	𨉻	𨉼	𨉽	𨉾	𨉿
U+2828x	𨊀	𨊁	𨊂	𨊃	𨊄	𨊅	𨊆	𨊇	𨊈	𨊉	𨊊	𨊋	𨊌	𨊍	𨊎	𨊏
U+2829x	𨊐	𨊑	𨊒	𨊓	𨊔	𨊕	𨊖	𨊗	𨊘	𨊙	𨊚	𨊛	𨊜	𨊝	𨊞	𨊟
U+282Ax	𨊠	𨊡	𨊢	𨊣	𨊤	𨊥	𨊦	𨊧	𨊨	𨊩	𨊪	𨊫	𨊬	𨊭	𨊮	𨊯
U+282Bx	𨊰	𨊱	𨊲	𨊳	𨊴	𨊵	𨊶	𨊷	𨊸	𨊹	𨊺	𨊻	𨊼	𨊽	𨊾	𨊿
U+282Cx	𨋀	𨋁	𨋂	𨋃	𨋄	𨋅	𨋆	𨋇	𨋈	𨋉	𨋊	𨋋	𨋌	𨋍	𨋎	𨋏
U+282Dx	𨋐	𨋑	𨋒	𨋓	𨋔	𨋕	𨋖	𨋗	𨋘	𨋙	𨋚	𨋛	𨋜	𨋝	𨋞	𨋟
U+282Ex	𨋠	𨋡	𨋢	𨋣	𨋤	𨋥	𨋦	𨋧	𨋨	𨋩	𨋪	𨋫	𨋬	𨋭	𨋮	𨋯
U+282Fx	𨋰	𨋱	𨋲	𨋳	𨋴	𨋵	𨋶	𨋷	𨋸	𨋹	𨋺	𨋻	𨋼	𨋽	𨋾	𨋿
U+2830x	𨌀	𨌁	𨌂	𨌃	𨌄	𨌅	𨌆	𨌇	𨌈	𨌉	𨌊	𨌋	𨌌	𨌍	𨌎	𨌏
U+2831x	𨌐	𨌑	𨌒	𨌓	𨌔	𨌕	𨌖	𨌗	𨌘	𨌙	𨌚	𨌛	𨌜	𨌝	𨌞	𨌟
U+2832x	𨌠	𨌡	𨌢	𨌣	𨌤	𨌥	𨌦	𨌧	𨌨	𨌩	𨌪	𨌫	𨌬	𨌭	𨌮	𨌯
U+2833x	𨌰	𨌱	𨌲	𨌳	𨌴	𨌵	𨌶	𨌷	𨌸	𨌹	𨌺	𨌻	𨌼	𨌽	𨌾	𨌿
U+2834x	𨍀	𨍁	𨍂	𨍃	𨍄	𨍅	𨍆	𨍇	𨍈	𨍉	𨍊	𨍋	𨍌	𨍍	𨍎	𨍏
U+2835x	𨍐	𨍑	𨍒	𨍓	𨍔	𨍕	𨍖	𨍗	𨍘	𨍙	𨍚	𨍛	𨍜	𨍝	𨍞	𨍟
U+2836x	𨍠	𨍡	𨍢	𨍣	𨍤	𨍥	𨍦	𨍧	𨍨	𨍩	𨍪	𨍫	𨍬	𨍭	𨍮	𨍯
U+2837x	𨍰	𨍱	𨍲	𨍳	𨍴	𨍵	𨍶	𨍷	𨍸	𨍹	𨍺	𨍻	𨍼	𨍽	𨍾	𨍿
U+2838x	𨎀	𨎁	𨎂	𨎃	𨎄	𨎅	𨎆	𨎇	𨎈	𨎉	𨎊	𨎋	𨎌	𨎍	𨎎	𨎏
U+2839x	𨎐	𨎑	𨎒	𨎓	𨎔	𨎕	𨎖	𨎗	𨎘	𨎙	𨎚	𨎛	𨎜	𨎝	𨎞	𨎟
U+283Ax	𨎠	𨎡	𨎢	𨎣	𨎤	𨎥	𨎦	𨎧	𨎨	𨎩	𨎪	𨎫	𨎬	𨎭	𨎮	𨎯
U+283Bx	𨎰	𨎱	𨎲	𨎳	𨎴	𨎵	𨎶	𨎷	𨎸	𨎹	𨎺	𨎻	𨎼	𨎽	𨎾	𨎿
U+283Cx	𨏀	𨏁	𨏂	𨏃	𨏄	𨏅	𨏆	𨏇	𨏈	𨏉	𨏊	𨏋	𨏌	𨏍	𨏎	𨏏
U+283Dx	𨏐	𨏑	𨏒	𨏓	𨏔	𨏕	𨏖	𨏗	𨏘	𨏙	𨏚	𨏛	𨏜	𨏝	𨏞	𨏟
U+283Ex	𨏠	𨏡	𨏢	𨏣	𨏤	𨏥	𨏦	𨏧	𨏨	𨏩	𨏪	𨏫	𨏬	𨏭	𨏮	𨏯
U+283Fx	𨏰	𨏱	𨏲	𨏳	𨏴	𨏵	𨏶	𨏷	𨏸	𨏹	𨏺	𨏻	𨏼	𨏽	𨏾	𨏿
U+2840x	𨐀	𨐁	𨐂	𨐃	𨐄	𨐅	𨐆	𨐇	𨐈	𨐉	𨐊	𨐋	𨐌	𨐍	𨐎	𨐏
U+2841x	𨐐	𨐑	𨐒	𨐓	𨐔	𨐕	𨐖	𨐗	𨐘	𨐙	𨐚	𨐛	𨐜	𨐝	𨐞	𨐟
U+2842x	𨐠	𨐡	𨐢	𨐣	𨐤	𨐥	𨐦	𨐧	𨐨	𨐩	𨐪	𨐫	𨐬	𨐭	𨐮	𨐯
U+2843x	𨐰	𨐱	𨐲	𨐳	𨐴	𨐵	𨐶	𨐷	𨐸	𨐹	𨐺	𨐻	𨐼	𨐽	𨐾	𨐿
U+2844x	𨑀	𨑁	𨑂	𨑃	𨑄	𨑅	𨑆	𨑇	𨑈	𨑉	𨑊	𨑋	𨑌	𨑍	𨑎	𨑏
U+2845x	𨑐	𨑑	𨑒	𨑓	𨑔	𨑕	𨑖	𨑗	𨑘	𨑙	𨑚	𨑛	𨑜	𨑝	𨑞	𨑟
U+2846x	𨑠	𨑡	𨑢	𨑣	𨑤	𨑥	𨑦	𨑧	𨑨	𨑩	𨑪	𨑫	𨑬	𨑭	𨑮	𨑯
U+2847x	𨑰	𨑱	𨑲	𨑳	𨑴	𨑵	𨑶	𨑷	𨑸	𨑹	𨑺	𨑻	𨑼	𨑽	𨑾	𨑿
U+2848x	𨒀	𨒁	𨒂	𨒃	𨒄	𨒅	𨒆	𨒇	𨒈	𨒉	𨒊	𨒋	𨒌	𨒍	𨒎	𨒏
U+2849x	𨒐	𨒑	𨒒	𨒓	𨒔	𨒕	𨒖	𨒗	𨒘	𨒙	𨒚	𨒛	𨒜	𨒝	𨒞	𨒟
U+284Ax	𨒠	𨒡	𨒢	𨒣	𨒤	𨒥	𨒦	𨒧	𨒨	𨒩	𨒪	𨒫	𨒬	𨒭	𨒮	𨒯
U+284Bx	𨒰	𨒱	𨒲	𨒳	𨒴	𨒵	𨒶	𨒷	𨒸	𨒹	𨒺	𨒻	𨒼	𨒽	𨒾	𨒿
U+284Cx	𨓀	𨓁	𨓂	𨓃	𨓄	𨓅	𨓆	𨓇	𨓈	𨓉	𨓊	𨓋	𨓌	𨓍	𨓎	𨓏
U+284Dx	𨓐	𨓑	𨓒	𨓓	𨓔	𨓕	𨓖	𨓗	𨓘	𨓙	𨓚	𨓛	𨓜	𨓝	𨓞	𨓟
U+284Ex	𨓠	𨓡	𨓢	𨓣	𨓤	𨓥	𨓦	𨓧	𨓨	𨓩	𨓪	𨓫	𨓬	𨓭	𨓮	𨓯
U+284Fx	𨓰	𨓱	𨓲	𨓳	𨓴	𨓵	𨓶	𨓷	𨓸	𨓹	𨓺	𨓻	𨓼	𨓽	𨓾	𨓿
U+2850x	𨔀	𨔁	𨔂	𨔃	𨔄	𨔅	𨔆	𨔇	𨔈	𨔉	𨔊	𨔋	𨔌	𨔍	𨔎	𨔏
U+2851x	𨔐	𨔑	𨔒	𨔓	𨔔	𨔕	𨔖	𨔗	𨔘	𨔙	𨔚	𨔛	𨔜	𨔝	𨔞	𨔟
U+2852x	𨔠	𨔡	𨔢	𨔣	𨔤	𨔥	𨔦	𨔧	𨔨	𨔩	𨔪	𨔫	𨔬	𨔭	𨔮	𨔯
U+2853x	𨔰	𨔱	𨔲	𨔳	𨔴	𨔵	𨔶	𨔷	𨔸	𨔹	𨔺	𨔻	𨔼	𨔽	𨔾	𨔿
U+2854x	𨕀	𨕁	𨕂	𨕃	𨕄	𨕅	𨕆	𨕇	𨕈	𨕉	𨕊	𨕋	𨕌	𨕍	𨕎	𨕏
U+2855x	𨕐	𨕑	𨕒	𨕓	𨕔	𨕕	𨕖	𨕗	𨕘	𨕙	𨕚	𨕛	𨕜	𨕝	𨕞	𨕟
U+2856x	𨕠	𨕡	𨕢	𨕣	𨕤	𨕥	𨕦	𨕧	𨕨	𨕩	𨕪	𨕫	𨕬	𨕭	𨕮	𨕯
U+2857x	𨕰	𨕱	𨕲	𨕳	𨕴	𨕵	𨕶	𨕷	𨕸	𨕹	𨕺	𨕻	𨕼	𨕽	𨕾	𨕿
U+2858x	𨖀	𨖁	𨖂	𨖃	𨖄	𨖅	𨖆	𨖇	𨖈	𨖉	𨖊	𨖋	𨖌	𨖍	𨖎	𨖏
U+2859x	𨖐	𨖑	𨖒	𨖓	𨖔	𨖕	𨖖	𨖗	𨖘	𨖙	𨖚	𨖛	𨖜	𨖝	𨖞	𨖟
U+285Ax	𨖠	𨖡	𨖢	𨖣	𨖤	𨖥	𨖦	𨖧	𨖨	𨖩	𨖪	𨖫	𨖬	𨖭	𨖮	𨖯
U+285Bx	𨖰	𨖱	𨖲	𨖳	𨖴	𨖵	𨖶	𨖷	𨖸	𨖹	𨖺	𨖻	𨖼	𨖽	𨖾	𨖿
U+285Cx	𨗀	𨗁	𨗂	𨗃	𨗄	𨗅	𨗆	𨗇	𨗈	𨗉	𨗊	𨗋	𨗌	𨗍	𨗎	𨗏
U+285Dx	𨗐	𨗑	𨗒	𨗓	𨗔	𨗕	𨗖	𨗗	𨗘	𨗙	𨗚	𨗛	𨗜	𨗝	𨗞	𨗟
U+285Ex	𨗠	𨗡	𨗢	𨗣	𨗤	𨗥	𨗦	𨗧	𨗨	𨗩	𨗪	𨗫	𨗬	𨗭	𨗮	𨗯
U+285Fx	𨗰	𨗱	𨗲	𨗳	𨗴	𨗵	𨗶	𨗷	𨗸	𨗹	𨗺	𨗻	𨗼	𨗽	𨗾	𨗿
U+2860x	𨘀	𨘁	𨘂	𨘃	𨘄	𨘅	𨘆	𨘇	𨘈	𨘉	𨘊	𨘋	𨘌	𨘍	𨘎	𨘏
U+2861x	𨘐	𨘑	𨘒	𨘓	𨘔	𨘕	𨘖	𨘗	𨘘	𨘙	𨘚	𨘛	𨘜	𨘝	𨘞	𨘟
U+2862x	𨘠	𨘡	𨘢	𨘣	𨘤	𨘥	𨘦	𨘧	𨘨	𨘩	𨘪	𨘫	𨘬	𨘭	𨘮	𨘯
U+2863x	𨘰	𨘱	𨘲	𨘳	𨘴	𨘵	𨘶	𨘷	𨘸	𨘹	𨘺	𨘻	𨘼	𨘽	𨘾	𨘿
U+2864x	𨙀	𨙁	𨙂	𨙃	𨙄	𨙅	𨙆	𨙇	𨙈	𨙉	𨙊	𨙋	𨙌	𨙍	𨙎	𨙏
U+2865x	𨙐	𨙑	𨙒	𨙓	𨙔	𨙕	𨙖	𨙗	𨙘	𨙙	𨙚	𨙛	𨙜	𨙝	𨙞	𨙟
U+2866x	𨙠	𨙡	𨙢	𨙣	𨙤	𨙥	𨙦	𨙧	𨙨	𨙩	𨙪	𨙫	𨙬	𨙭	𨙮	𨙯
U+2867x	𨙰	𨙱	𨙲	𨙳	𨙴	𨙵	𨙶	𨙷	𨙸	𨙹	𨙺	𨙻	𨙼	𨙽	𨙾	𨙿
U+2868x	𨚀	𨚁	𨚂	𨚃	𨚄	𨚅	𨚆	𨚇	𨚈	𨚉	𨚊	𨚋	𨚌	𨚍	𨚎	𨚏
U+2869x	𨚐	𨚑	𨚒	𨚓	𨚔	𨚕	𨚖	𨚗	𨚘	𨚙	𨚚	𨚛	𨚜	𨚝	𨚞	𨚟
U+286Ax	𨚠	𨚡	𨚢	𨚣	𨚤	𨚥	𨚦	𨚧	𨚨	𨚩	𨚪	𨚫	𨚬	𨚭	𨚮	𨚯
U+286Bx	𨚰	𨚱	𨚲	𨚳	𨚴	𨚵	𨚶	𨚷	𨚸	𨚹	𨚺	𨚻	𨚼	𨚽	𨚾	𨚿
U+286Cx	𨛀	𨛁	𨛂	𨛃	𨛄	𨛅	𨛆	𨛇	𨛈	𨛉	𨛊	𨛋	𨛌	𨛍	𨛎	𨛏
U+286Dx	𨛐	𨛑	𨛒	𨛓	𨛔	𨛕	𨛖	𨛗	𨛘	𨛙	𨛚	𨛛	𨛜	𨛝	𨛞	𨛟
U+286Ex	𨛠	𨛡	𨛢	𨛣	𨛤	𨛥	𨛦	𨛧	𨛨	𨛩	𨛪	𨛫	𨛬	𨛭	𨛮	𨛯
U+286Fx	𨛰	𨛱	𨛲	𨛳	𨛴	𨛵	𨛶	𨛷	𨛸	𨛹	𨛺	𨛻	𨛼	𨛽	𨛾	𨛿
U+2870x	𨜀	𨜁	𨜂	𨜃	𨜄	𨜅	𨜆	𨜇	𨜈	𨜉	𨜊	𨜋	𨜌	𨜍	𨜎	𨜏
U+2871x	𨜐	𨜑	𨜒	𨜓	𨜔	𨜕	𨜖	𨜗	𨜘	𨜙	𨜚	𨜛	𨜜	𨜝	𨜞	𨜟
U+2872x	𨜠	𨜡	𨜢	𨜣	𨜤	𨜥	𨜦	𨜧	𨜨	𨜩	𨜪	𨜫	𨜬	𨜭	𨜮	𨜯
U+2873x	𨜰	𨜱	𨜲	𨜳	𨜴	𨜵	𨜶	𨜷	𨜸	𨜹	𨜺	𨜻	𨜼	𨜽	𨜾	𨜿
U+2874x	𨝀	𨝁	𨝂	𨝃	𨝄	𨝅	𨝆	𨝇	𨝈	𨝉	𨝊	𨝋	𨝌	𨝍	𨝎	𨝏
U+2875x	𨝐	𨝑	𨝒	𨝓	𨝔	𨝕	𨝖	𨝗	𨝘	𨝙	𨝚	𨝛	𨝜	𨝝	𨝞	𨝟
U+2876x	𨝠	𨝡	𨝢	𨝣	𨝤	𨝥	𨝦	𨝧	𨝨	𨝩	𨝪	𨝫	𨝬	𨝭	𨝮	𨝯
U+2877x	𨝰	𨝱	𨝲	𨝳	𨝴	𨝵	𨝶	𨝷	𨝸	𨝹	𨝺	𨝻	𨝼	𨝽	𨝾	𨝿
U+2878x	𨞀	𨞁	𨞂	𨞃	𨞄	𨞅	𨞆	𨞇	𨞈	𨞉	𨞊	𨞋	𨞌	𨞍	𨞎	𨞏
U+2879x	𨞐	𨞑	𨞒	𨞓	𨞔	𨞕	𨞖	𨞗	𨞘	𨞙	𨞚	𨞛	𨞜	𨞝	𨞞	𨞟
U+287Ax	𨞠	𨞡	𨞢	𨞣	𨞤	𨞥	𨞦	𨞧	𨞨	𨞩	𨞪	𨞫	𨞬	𨞭	𨞮	𨞯
U+287Bx	𨞰	𨞱	𨞲	𨞳	𨞴	𨞵	𨞶	𨞷	𨞸	𨞹	𨞺	𨞻	𨞼	𨞽	𨞾	𨞿
U+287Cx	𨟀	𨟁	𨟂	𨟃	𨟄	𨟅	𨟆	𨟇	𨟈	𨟉	𨟊	𨟋	𨟌	𨟍	𨟎	𨟏
U+287Dx	𨟐	𨟑	𨟒	𨟓	𨟔	𨟕	𨟖	𨟗	𨟘	𨟙	𨟚	𨟛	𨟜	𨟝	𨟞	𨟟
U+287Ex	𨟠	𨟡	𨟢	𨟣	𨟤	𨟥	𨟦	𨟧	𨟨	𨟩	𨟪	𨟫	𨟬	𨟭	𨟮	𨟯
U+287Fx	𨟰	𨟱	𨟲	𨟳	𨟴	𨟵	𨟶	𨟷	𨟸	𨟹	𨟺	𨟻	𨟼	𨟽	𨟾	𨟿
U+2880x	𨠀	𨠁	𨠂	𨠃	𨠄	𨠅	𨠆	𨠇	𨠈	𨠉	𨠊	𨠋	𨠌	𨠍	𨠎	𨠏
U+2881x	𨠐	𨠑	𨠒	𨠓	𨠔	𨠕	𨠖	𨠗	𨠘	𨠙	𨠚	𨠛	𨠜	𨠝	𨠞	𨠟
U+2882x	𨠠	𨠡	𨠢	𨠣	𨠤	𨠥	𨠦	𨠧	𨠨	𨠩	𨠪	𨠫	𨠬	𨠭	𨠮	𨠯
U+2883x	𨠰	𨠱	𨠲	𨠳	𨠴	𨠵	𨠶	𨠷	𨠸	𨠹	𨠺	𨠻	𨠼	𨠽	𨠾	𨠿
U+2884x	𨡀	𨡁	𨡂	𨡃	𨡄	𨡅	𨡆	𨡇	𨡈	𨡉	𨡊	𨡋	𨡌	𨡍	𨡎	𨡏
U+2885x	𨡐	𨡑	𨡒	𨡓	𨡔	𨡕	𨡖	𨡗	𨡘	𨡙	𨡚	𨡛	𨡜	𨡝	𨡞	𨡟
U+2886x	𨡠	𨡡	𨡢	𨡣	𨡤	𨡥	𨡦	𨡧	𨡨	𨡩	𨡪	𨡫	𨡬	𨡭	𨡮	𨡯
U+2887x	𨡰	𨡱	𨡲	𨡳	𨡴	𨡵	𨡶	𨡷	𨡸	𨡹	𨡺	𨡻	𨡼	𨡽	𨡾	𨡿
U+2888x	𨢀	𨢁	𨢂	𨢃	𨢄	𨢅	𨢆	𨢇	𨢈	𨢉	𨢊	𨢋	𨢌	𨢍	𨢎	𨢏
U+2889x	𨢐	𨢑	𨢒	𨢓	𨢔	𨢕	𨢖	𨢗	𨢘	𨢙	𨢚	𨢛	𨢜	𨢝	𨢞	𨢟
U+288Ax	𨢠	𨢡	𨢢	𨢣	𨢤	𨢥	𨢦	𨢧	𨢨	𨢩	𨢪	𨢫	𨢬	𨢭	𨢮	𨢯
U+288Bx	𨢰	𨢱	𨢲	𨢳	𨢴	𨢵	𨢶	𨢷	𨢸	𨢹	𨢺	𨢻	𨢼	𨢽	𨢾	𨢿
U+288Cx	𨣀	𨣁	𨣂	𨣃	𨣄	𨣅	𨣆	𨣇	𨣈	𨣉	𨣊	𨣋	𨣌	𨣍	𨣎	𨣏
U+288Dx	𨣐	𨣑	𨣒	𨣓	𨣔	𨣕	𨣖	𨣗	𨣘	𨣙	𨣚	𨣛	𨣜	𨣝	𨣞	𨣟
U+288Ex	𨣠	𨣡	𨣢	𨣣	𨣤	𨣥	𨣦	𨣧	𨣨	𨣩	𨣪	𨣫	𨣬	𨣭	𨣮	𨣯
U+288Fx	𨣰	𨣱	𨣲	𨣳	𨣴	𨣵	𨣶	𨣷	𨣸	𨣹	𨣺	𨣻	𨣼	𨣽	𨣾	𨣿
U+2890x	𨤀	𨤁	𨤂	𨤃	𨤄	𨤅	𨤆	𨤇	𨤈	𨤉	𨤊	𨤋	𨤌	𨤍	𨤎	𨤏
U+2891x	𨤐	𨤑	𨤒	𨤓	𨤔	𨤕	𨤖	𨤗	𨤘	𨤙	𨤚	𨤛	𨤜	𨤝	𨤞	𨤟
U+2892x	𨤠	𨤡	𨤢	𨤣	𨤤	𨤥	𨤦	𨤧	𨤨	𨤩	𨤪	𨤫	𨤬	𨤭	𨤮	𨤯
U+2893x	𨤰	𨤱	𨤲	𨤳	𨤴	𨤵	𨤶	𨤷	𨤸	𨤹	𨤺	𨤻	𨤼	𨤽	𨤾	𨤿
U+2894x	𨥀	𨥁	𨥂	𨥃	𨥄	𨥅	𨥆	𨥇	𨥈	𨥉	𨥊	𨥋	𨥌	𨥍	𨥎	𨥏
U+2895x	𨥐	𨥑	𨥒	𨥓	𨥔	𨥕	𨥖	𨥗	𨥘	𨥙	𨥚	𨥛	𨥜	𨥝	𨥞	𨥟
U+2896x	𨥠	𨥡	𨥢	𨥣	𨥤	𨥥	𨥦	𨥧	𨥨	𨥩	𨥪	𨥫	𨥬	𨥭	𨥮	𨥯
U+2897x	𨥰	𨥱	𨥲	𨥳	𨥴	𨥵	𨥶	𨥷	𨥸	𨥹	𨥺	𨥻	𨥼	𨥽	𨥾	𨥿
U+2898x	𨦀	𨦁	𨦂	𨦃	𨦄	𨦅	𨦆	𨦇	𨦈	𨦉	𨦊	𨦋	𨦌	𨦍	𨦎	𨦏
U+2899x	𨦐	𨦑	𨦒	𨦓	𨦔	𨦕	𨦖	𨦗	𨦘	𨦙	𨦚	𨦛	𨦜	𨦝	𨦞	𨦟
U+289Ax	𨦠	𨦡	𨦢	𨦣	𨦤	𨦥	𨦦	𨦧	𨦨	𨦩	𨦪	𨦫	𨦬	𨦭	𨦮	𨦯
U+289Bx	𨦰	𨦱	𨦲	𨦳	𨦴	𨦵	𨦶	𨦷	𨦸	𨦹	𨦺	𨦻	𨦼	𨦽	𨦾	𨦿
U+289Cx	𨧀	𨧁	𨧂	𨧃	𨧄	𨧅	𨧆	𨧇	𨧈	𨧉	𨧊	𨧋	𨧌	𨧍	𨧎	𨧏
U+289Dx	𨧐	𨧑	𨧒	𨧓	𨧔	𨧕	𨧖	𨧗	𨧘	𨧙	𨧚	𨧛	𨧜	𨧝	𨧞	𨧟
U+289Ex	𨧠	𨧡	𨧢	𨧣	𨧤	𨧥	𨧦	𨧧	𨧨	𨧩	𨧪	𨧫	𨧬	𨧭	𨧮	𨧯
U+289Fx	𨧰	𨧱	𨧲	𨧳	𨧴	𨧵	𨧶	𨧷	𨧸	𨧹	𨧺	𨧻	𨧼	𨧽	𨧾	𨧿
U+28A0x	𨨀	𨨁	𨨂	𨨃	𨨄	𨨅	𨨆	𨨇	𨨈	𨨉	𨨊	𨨋	𨨌	𨨍	𨨎	𨨏
U+28A1x	𨨐	𨨑	𨨒	𨨓	𨨔	𨨕	𨨖	𨨗	𨨘	𨨙	𨨚	𨨛	𨨜	𨨝	𨨞	𨨟
U+28A2x	𨨠	𨨡	𨨢	𨨣	𨨤	𨨥	𨨦	𨨧	𨨨	𨨩	𨨪	𨨫	𨨬	𨨭	𨨮	𨨯
U+28A3x	𨨰	𨨱	𨨲	𨨳	𨨴	𨨵	𨨶	𨨷	𨨸	𨨹	𨨺	𨨻	𨨼	𨨽	𨨾	𨨿
U+28A4x	𨩀	𨩁	𨩂	𨩃	𨩄	𨩅	𨩆	𨩇	𨩈	𨩉	𨩊	𨩋	𨩌	𨩍	𨩎	𨩏
U+28A5x	𨩐	𨩑	𨩒	𨩓	𨩔	𨩕	𨩖	𨩗	𨩘	𨩙	𨩚	𨩛	𨩜	𨩝	𨩞	𨩟
U+28A6x	𨩠	𨩡	𨩢	𨩣	𨩤	𨩥	𨩦	𨩧	𨩨	𨩩	𨩪	𨩫	𨩬	𨩭	𨩮	𨩯
U+28A7x	𨩰	𨩱	𨩲	𨩳	𨩴	𨩵	𨩶	𨩷	𨩸	𨩹	𨩺	𨩻	𨩼	𨩽	𨩾	𨩿
U+28A8x	𨪀	𨪁	𨪂	𨪃	𨪄	𨪅	𨪆	𨪇	𨪈	𨪉	𨪊	𨪋	𨪌	𨪍	𨪎	𨪏
U+28A9x	𨪐	𨪑	𨪒	𨪓	𨪔	𨪕	𨪖	𨪗	𨪘	𨪙	𨪚	𨪛	𨪜	𨪝	𨪞	𨪟
U+28AAx	𨪠	𨪡	𨪢	𨪣	𨪤	𨪥	𨪦	𨪧	𨪨	𨪩	𨪪	𨪫	𨪬	𨪭	𨪮	𨪯
U+28ABx	𨪰	𨪱	𨪲	𨪳	𨪴	𨪵	𨪶	𨪷	𨪸	𨪹	𨪺	𨪻	𨪼	𨪽	𨪾	𨪿
U+28ACx	𨫀	𨫁	𨫂	𨫃	𨫄	𨫅	𨫆	𨫇	𨫈	𨫉	𨫊	𨫋	𨫌	𨫍	𨫎	𨫏
U+28ADx	𨫐	𨫑	𨫒	𨫓	𨫔	𨫕	𨫖	𨫗	𨫘	𨫙	𨫚	𨫛	𨫜	𨫝	𨫞	𨫟
U+28AEx	𨫠	𨫡	𨫢	𨫣	𨫤	𨫥	𨫦	𨫧	𨫨	𨫩	𨫪	𨫫	𨫬	𨫭	𨫮	𨫯
U+28AFx	𨫰	𨫱	𨫲	𨫳	𨫴	𨫵	𨫶	𨫷	𨫸	𨫹	𨫺	𨫻	𨫼	𨫽	𨫾	𨫿
U+28B0x	𨬀	𨬁	𨬂	𨬃	𨬄	𨬅	𨬆	𨬇	𨬈	𨬉	𨬊	𨬋	𨬌	𨬍	𨬎	𨬏
U+28B1x	𨬐	𨬑	𨬒	𨬓	𨬔	𨬕	𨬖	𨬗	𨬘	𨬙	𨬚	𨬛	𨬜	𨬝	𨬞	𨬟
U+28B2x	𨬠	𨬡	𨬢	𨬣	𨬤	𨬥	𨬦	𨬧	𨬨	𨬩	𨬪	𨬫	𨬬	𨬭	𨬮	𨬯
U+28B3x	𨬰	𨬱	𨬲	𨬳	𨬴	𨬵	𨬶	𨬷	𨬸	𨬹	𨬺	𨬻	𨬼	𨬽	𨬾	𨬿
U+28B4x	𨭀	𨭁	𨭂	𨭃	𨭄	𨭅	𨭆	𨭇	𨭈	𨭉	𨭊	𨭋	𨭌	𨭍	𨭎	𨭏
U+28B5x	𨭐	𨭑	𨭒	𨭓	𨭔	𨭕	𨭖	𨭗	𨭘	𨭙	𨭚	𨭛	𨭜	𨭝	𨭞	𨭟
U+28B6x	𨭠	𨭡	𨭢	𨭣	𨭤	𨭥	𨭦	𨭧	𨭨	𨭩	𨭪	𨭫	𨭬	𨭭	𨭮	𨭯
U+28B7x	𨭰	𨭱	𨭲	𨭳	𨭴	𨭵	𨭶	𨭷	𨭸	𨭹	𨭺	𨭻	𨭼	𨭽	𨭾	𨭿
U+28B8x	𨮀	𨮁	𨮂	𨮃	𨮄	𨮅	𨮆	𨮇	𨮈	𨮉	𨮊	𨮋	𨮌	𨮍	𨮎	𨮏
U+28B9x	𨮐	𨮑	𨮒	𨮓	𨮔	𨮕	𨮖	𨮗	𨮘	𨮙	𨮚	𨮛	𨮜	𨮝	𨮞	𨮟
U+28BAx	𨮠	𨮡	𨮢	𨮣	𨮤	𨮥	𨮦	𨮧	𨮨	𨮩	𨮪	𨮫	𨮬	𨮭	𨮮	𨮯
U+28BBx	𨮰	𨮱	𨮲	𨮳	𨮴	𨮵	𨮶	𨮷	𨮸	𨮹	𨮺	𨮻	𨮼	𨮽	𨮾	𨮿
U+28BCx	𨯀	𨯁	𨯂	𨯃	𨯄	𨯅	𨯆	𨯇	𨯈	𨯉	𨯊	𨯋	𨯌	𨯍	𨯎	𨯏
U+28BDx	𨯐	𨯑	𨯒	𨯓	𨯔	𨯕	𨯖	𨯗	𨯘	𨯙	𨯚	𨯛	𨯜	𨯝	𨯞	𨯟
U+28BEx	𨯠	𨯡	𨯢	𨯣	𨯤	𨯥	𨯦	𨯧	𨯨	𨯩	𨯪	𨯫	𨯬	𨯭	𨯮	𨯯
U+28BFx	𨯰	𨯱	𨯲	𨯳	𨯴	𨯵	𨯶	𨯷	𨯸	𨯹	𨯺	𨯻	𨯼	𨯽	𨯾	𨯿
U+28C0x	𨰀	𨰁	𨰂	𨰃	𨰄	𨰅	𨰆	𨰇	𨰈	𨰉	𨰊	𨰋	𨰌	𨰍	𨰎	𨰏
U+28C1x	𨰐	𨰑	𨰒	𨰓	𨰔	𨰕	𨰖	𨰗	𨰘	𨰙	𨰚	𨰛	𨰜	𨰝	𨰞	𨰟
U+28C2x	𨰠	𨰡	𨰢	𨰣	𨰤	𨰥	𨰦	𨰧	𨰨	𨰩	𨰪	𨰫	𨰬	𨰭	𨰮	𨰯
U+28C3x	𨰰	𨰱	𨰲	𨰳	𨰴	𨰵	𨰶	𨰷	𨰸	𨰹	𨰺	𨰻	𨰼	𨰽	𨰾	𨰿
U+28C4x	𨱀	𨱁	𨱂	𨱃	𨱄	𨱅	𨱆	𨱇	𨱈	𨱉	𨱊	𨱋	𨱌	𨱍	𨱎	𨱏
U+28C5x	𨱐	𨱑	𨱒	𨱓	𨱔	𨱕	𨱖	𨱗	𨱘	𨱙	𨱚	𨱛	𨱜	𨱝	𨱞	𨱟
U+28C6x	𨱠	𨱡	𨱢	𨱣	𨱤	𨱥	𨱦	𨱧	𨱨	𨱩	𨱪	𨱫	𨱬	𨱭	𨱮	𨱯
U+28C7x	𨱰	𨱱	𨱲	𨱳	𨱴	𨱵	𨱶	𨱷	𨱸	𨱹	𨱺	𨱻	𨱼	𨱽	𨱾	𨱿
U+28C8x	𨲀	𨲁	𨲂	𨲃	𨲄	𨲅	𨲆	𨲇	𨲈	𨲉	𨲊	𨲋	𨲌	𨲍	𨲎	𨲏
U+28C9x	𨲐	𨲑	𨲒	𨲓	𨲔	𨲕	𨲖	𨲗	𨲘	𨲙	𨲚	𨲛	𨲜	𨲝	𨲞	𨲟
U+28CAx	𨲠	𨲡	𨲢	𨲣	𨲤	𨲥	𨲦	𨲧	𨲨	𨲩	𨲪	𨲫	𨲬	𨲭	𨲮	𨲯
U+28CBx	𨲰	𨲱	𨲲	𨲳	𨲴	𨲵	𨲶	𨲷	𨲸	𨲹	𨲺	𨲻	𨲼	𨲽	𨲾	𨲿
U+28CCx	𨳀	𨳁	𨳂	𨳃	𨳄	𨳅	𨳆	𨳇	𨳈	𨳉	𨳊	𨳋	𨳌	𨳍	𨳎	𨳏
U+28CDx	𨳐	𨳑	𨳒	𨳓	𨳔	𨳕	𨳖	𨳗	𨳘	𨳙	𨳚	𨳛	𨳜	𨳝	𨳞	𨳟
U+28CEx	𨳠	𨳡	𨳢	𨳣	𨳤	𨳥	𨳦	𨳧	𨳨	𨳩	𨳪	𨳫	𨳬	𨳭	𨳮	𨳯
U+28CFx	𨳰	𨳱	𨳲	𨳳	𨳴	𨳵	𨳶	𨳷	𨳸	𨳹	𨳺	𨳻	𨳼	𨳽	𨳾	𨳿
U+28D0x	𨴀	𨴁	𨴂	𨴃	𨴄	𨴅	𨴆	𨴇	𨴈	𨴉	𨴊	𨴋	𨴌	𨴍	𨴎	𨴏
U+28D1x	𨴐	𨴑	𨴒	𨴓	𨴔	𨴕	𨴖	𨴗	𨴘	𨴙	𨴚	𨴛	𨴜	𨴝	𨴞	𨴟
U+28D2x	𨴠	𨴡	𨴢	𨴣	𨴤	𨴥	𨴦	𨴧	𨴨	𨴩	𨴪	𨴫	𨴬	𨴭	𨴮	𨴯
U+28D3x	𨴰	𨴱	𨴲	𨴳	𨴴	𨴵	𨴶	𨴷	𨴸	𨴹	𨴺	𨴻	𨴼	𨴽	𨴾	𨴿
U+28D4x	𨵀	𨵁	𨵂	𨵃	𨵄	𨵅	𨵆	𨵇	𨵈	𨵉	𨵊	𨵋	𨵌	𨵍	𨵎	𨵏
U+28D5x	𨵐	𨵑	𨵒	𨵓	𨵔	𨵕	𨵖	𨵗	𨵘	𨵙	𨵚	𨵛	𨵜	𨵝	𨵞	𨵟
U+28D6x	𨵠	𨵡	𨵢	𨵣	𨵤	𨵥	𨵦	𨵧	𨵨	𨵩	𨵪	𨵫	𨵬	𨵭	𨵮	𨵯
U+28D7x	𨵰	𨵱	𨵲	𨵳	𨵴	𨵵	𨵶	𨵷	𨵸	𨵹	𨵺	𨵻	𨵼	𨵽	𨵾	𨵿
U+28D8x	𨶀	𨶁	𨶂	𨶃	𨶄	𨶅	𨶆	𨶇	𨶈	𨶉	𨶊	𨶋	𨶌	𨶍	𨶎	𨶏
U+28D9x	𨶐	𨶑	𨶒	𨶓	𨶔	𨶕	𨶖	𨶗	𨶘	𨶙	𨶚	𨶛	𨶜	𨶝	𨶞	𨶟
U+28DAx	𨶠	𨶡	𨶢	𨶣	𨶤	𨶥	𨶦	𨶧	𨶨	𨶩	𨶪	𨶫	𨶬	𨶭	𨶮	𨶯
U+28DBx	𨶰	𨶱	𨶲	𨶳	𨶴	𨶵	𨶶	𨶷	𨶸	𨶹	𨶺	𨶻	𨶼	𨶽	𨶾	𨶿
U+28DCx	𨷀	𨷁	𨷂	𨷃	𨷄	𨷅	𨷆	𨷇	𨷈	𨷉	𨷊	𨷋	𨷌	𨷍	𨷎	𨷏
U+28DDx	𨷐	𨷑	𨷒	𨷓	𨷔	𨷕	𨷖	𨷗	𨷘	𨷙	𨷚	𨷛	𨷜	𨷝	𨷞	𨷟
U+28DEx	𨷠	𨷡	𨷢	𨷣	𨷤	𨷥	𨷦	𨷧	𨷨	𨷩	𨷪	𨷫	𨷬	𨷭	𨷮	𨷯
U+28DFx	𨷰	𨷱	𨷲	𨷳	𨷴	𨷵	𨷶	𨷷	𨷸	𨷹	𨷺	𨷻	𨷼	𨷽	𨷾	𨷿
U+28E0x	𨸀	𨸁	𨸂	𨸃	𨸄	𨸅	𨸆	𨸇	𨸈	𨸉	𨸊	𨸋	𨸌	𨸍	𨸎	𨸏
U+28E1x	𨸐	𨸑	𨸒	𨸓	𨸔	𨸕	𨸖	𨸗	𨸘	𨸙	𨸚	𨸛	𨸜	𨸝	𨸞	𨸟
U+28E2x	𨸠	𨸡	𨸢	𨸣	𨸤	𨸥	𨸦	𨸧	𨸨	𨸩	𨸪	𨸫	𨸬	𨸭	𨸮	𨸯
U+28E3x	𨸰	𨸱	𨸲	𨸳	𨸴	𨸵	𨸶	𨸷	𨸸	𨸹	𨸺	𨸻	𨸼	𨸽	𨸾	𨸿
U+28E4x	𨹀	𨹁	𨹂	𨹃	𨹄	𨹅	𨹆	𨹇	𨹈	𨹉	𨹊	𨹋	𨹌	𨹍	𨹎	𨹏
U+28E5x	𨹐	𨹑	𨹒	𨹓	𨹔	𨹕	𨹖	𨹗	𨹘	𨹙	𨹚	𨹛	𨹜	𨹝	𨹞	𨹟
U+28E6x	𨹠	𨹡	𨹢	𨹣	𨹤	𨹥	𨹦	𨹧	𨹨	𨹩	𨹪	𨹫	𨹬	𨹭	𨹮	𨹯
U+28E7x	𨹰	𨹱	𨹲	𨹳	𨹴	𨹵	𨹶	𨹷	𨹸	𨹹	𨹺	𨹻	𨹼	𨹽	𨹾	𨹿
U+28E8x	𨺀	𨺁	𨺂	𨺃	𨺄	𨺅	𨺆	𨺇	𨺈	𨺉	𨺊	𨺋	𨺌	𨺍	𨺎	𨺏
U+28E9x	𨺐	𨺑	𨺒	𨺓	𨺔	𨺕	𨺖	𨺗	𨺘	𨺙	𨺚	𨺛	𨺜	𨺝	𨺞	𨺟
U+28EAx	𨺠	𨺡	𨺢	𨺣	𨺤	𨺥	𨺦	𨺧	𨺨	𨺩	𨺪	𨺫	𨺬	𨺭	𨺮	𨺯
U+28EBx	𨺰	𨺱	𨺲	𨺳	𨺴	𨺵	𨺶	𨺷	𨺸	𨺹	𨺺	𨺻	𨺼	𨺽	𨺾	𨺿
U+28ECx	𨻀	𨻁	𨻂	𨻃	𨻄	𨻅	𨻆	𨻇	𨻈	𨻉	𨻊	𨻋	𨻌	𨻍	𨻎	𨻏
U+28EDx	𨻐	𨻑	𨻒	𨻓	𨻔	𨻕	𨻖	𨻗	𨻘	𨻙	𨻚	𨻛	𨻜	𨻝	𨻞	𨻟
U+28EEx	𨻠	𨻡	𨻢	𨻣	𨻤	𨻥	𨻦	𨻧	𨻨	𨻩	𨻪	𨻫	𨻬	𨻭	𨻮	𨻯
U+28EFx	𨻰	𨻱	𨻲	𨻳	𨻴	𨻵	𨻶	𨻷	𨻸	𨻹	𨻺	𨻻	𨻼	𨻽	𨻾	𨻿
U+28F0x	𨼀	𨼁	𨼂	𨼃	𨼄	𨼅	𨼆	𨼇	𨼈	𨼉	𨼊	𨼋	𨼌	𨼍	𨼎	𨼏
U+28F1x	𨼐	𨼑	𨼒	𨼓	𨼔	𨼕	𨼖	𨼗	𨼘	𨼙	𨼚	𨼛	𨼜	𨼝	𨼞	𨼟
U+28F2x	𨼠	𨼡	𨼢	𨼣	𨼤	𨼥	𨼦	𨼧	𨼨	𨼩	𨼪	𨼫	𨼬	𨼭	𨼮	𨼯
U+28F3x	𨼰	𨼱	𨼲	𨼳	𨼴	𨼵	𨼶	𨼷	𨼸	𨼹	𨼺	𨼻	𨼼	𨼽	𨼾	𨼿
U+28F4x	𨽀	𨽁	𨽂	𨽃	𨽄	𨽅	𨽆	𨽇	𨽈	𨽉	𨽊	𨽋	𨽌	𨽍	𨽎	𨽏
U+28F5x	𨽐	𨽑	𨽒	𨽓	𨽔	𨽕	𨽖	𨽗	𨽘	𨽙	𨽚	𨽛	𨽜	𨽝	𨽞	𨽟
U+28F6x	𨽠	𨽡	𨽢	𨽣	𨽤	𨽥	𨽦	𨽧	𨽨	𨽩	𨽪	𨽫	𨽬	𨽭	𨽮	𨽯
U+28F7x	𨽰	𨽱	𨽲	𨽳	𨽴	𨽵	𨽶	𨽷	𨽸	𨽹	𨽺	𨽻	𨽼	𨽽	𨽾	𨽿
U+28F8x	𨾀	𨾁	𨾂	𨾃	𨾄	𨾅	𨾆	𨾇	𨾈	𨾉	𨾊	𨾋	𨾌	𨾍	𨾎	𨾏
U+28F9x	𨾐	𨾑	𨾒	𨾓	𨾔	𨾕	𨾖	𨾗	𨾘	𨾙	𨾚	𨾛	𨾜	𨾝	𨾞	𨾟
U+28FAx	𨾠	𨾡	𨾢	𨾣	𨾤	𨾥	𨾦	𨾧	𨾨	𨾩	𨾪	𨾫	𨾬	𨾭	𨾮	𨾯
U+28FBx	𨾰	𨾱	𨾲	𨾳	𨾴	𨾵	𨾶	𨾷	𨾸	𨾹	𨾺	𨾻	𨾼	𨾽	𨾾	𨾿
U+28FCx	𨿀	𨿁	𨿂	𨿃	𨿄	𨿅	𨿆	𨿇	𨿈	𨿉	𨿊	𨿋	𨿌	𨿍	𨿎	𨿏
U+28FDx	𨿐	𨿑	𨿒	𨿓	𨿔	𨿕	𨿖	𨿗	𨿘	𨿙	𨿚	𨿛	𨿜	𨿝	𨿞	𨿟
U+28FEx	𨿠	𨿡	𨿢	𨿣	𨿤	𨿥	𨿦	𨿧	𨿨	𨿩	𨿪	𨿫	𨿬	𨿭	𨿮	𨿯
U+28FFx	𨿰	𨿱	𨿲	𨿳	𨿴	𨿵	𨿶	𨿷	𨿸	𨿹	𨿺	𨿻	𨿼	𨿽	𨿾	𨿿
U+2900x	𩀀	𩀁	𩀂	𩀃	𩀄	𩀅	𩀆	𩀇	𩀈	𩀉	𩀊	𩀋	𩀌	𩀍	𩀎	𩀏
U+2901x	𩀐	𩀑	𩀒	𩀓	𩀔	𩀕	𩀖	𩀗	𩀘	𩀙	𩀚	𩀛	𩀜	𩀝	𩀞	𩀟
U+2902x	𩀠	𩀡	𩀢	𩀣	𩀤	𩀥	𩀦	𩀧	𩀨	𩀩	𩀪	𩀫	𩀬	𩀭	𩀮	𩀯
U+2903x	𩀰	𩀱	𩀲	𩀳	𩀴	𩀵	𩀶	𩀷	𩀸	𩀹	𩀺	𩀻	𩀼	𩀽	𩀾	𩀿
U+2904x	𩁀	𩁁	𩁂	𩁃	𩁄	𩁅	𩁆	𩁇	𩁈	𩁉	𩁊	𩁋	𩁌	𩁍	𩁎	𩁏
U+2905x	𩁐	𩁑	𩁒	𩁓	𩁔	𩁕	𩁖	𩁗	𩁘	𩁙	𩁚	𩁛	𩁜	𩁝	𩁞	𩁟
U+2906x	𩁠	𩁡	𩁢	𩁣	𩁤	𩁥	𩁦	𩁧	𩁨	𩁩	𩁪	𩁫	𩁬	𩁭	𩁮	𩁯
U+2907x	𩁰	𩁱	𩁲	𩁳	𩁴	𩁵	𩁶	𩁷	𩁸	𩁹	𩁺	𩁻	𩁼	𩁽	𩁾	𩁿
U+2908x	𩂀	𩂁	𩂂	𩂃	𩂄	𩂅	𩂆	𩂇	𩂈	𩂉	𩂊	𩂋	𩂌	𩂍	𩂎	𩂏
U+2909x	𩂐	𩂑	𩂒	𩂓	𩂔	𩂕	𩂖	𩂗	𩂘	𩂙	𩂚	𩂛	𩂜	𩂝	𩂞	𩂟
U+290Ax	𩂠	𩂡	𩂢	𩂣	𩂤	𩂥	𩂦	𩂧	𩂨	𩂩	𩂪	𩂫	𩂬	𩂭	𩂮	𩂯
U+290Bx	𩂰	𩂱	𩂲	𩂳	𩂴	𩂵	𩂶	𩂷	𩂸	𩂹	𩂺	𩂻	𩂼	𩂽	𩂾	𩂿
U+290Cx	𩃀	𩃁	𩃂	𩃃	𩃄	𩃅	𩃆	𩃇	𩃈	𩃉	𩃊	𩃋	𩃌	𩃍	𩃎	𩃏
U+290Dx	𩃐	𩃑	𩃒	𩃓	𩃔	𩃕	𩃖	𩃗	𩃘	𩃙	𩃚	𩃛	𩃜	𩃝	𩃞	𩃟
U+290Ex	𩃠	𩃡	𩃢	𩃣	𩃤	𩃥	𩃦	𩃧	𩃨	𩃩	𩃪	𩃫	𩃬	𩃭	𩃮	𩃯
U+290Fx	𩃰	𩃱	𩃲	𩃳	𩃴	𩃵	𩃶	𩃷	𩃸	𩃹	𩃺	𩃻	𩃼	𩃽	𩃾	𩃿
U+2910x	𩄀	𩄁	𩄂	𩄃	𩄄	𩄅	𩄆	𩄇	𩄈	𩄉	𩄊	𩄋	𩄌	𩄍	𩄎	𩄏
U+2911x	𩄐	𩄑	𩄒	𩄓	𩄔	𩄕	𩄖	𩄗	𩄘	𩄙	𩄚	𩄛	𩄜	𩄝	𩄞	𩄟
U+2912x	𩄠	𩄡	𩄢	𩄣	𩄤	𩄥	𩄦	𩄧	𩄨	𩄩	𩄪	𩄫	𩄬	𩄭	𩄮	𩄯
U+2913x	𩄰	𩄱	𩄲	𩄳	𩄴	𩄵	𩄶	𩄷	𩄸	𩄹	𩄺	𩄻	𩄼	𩄽	𩄾	𩄿
U+2914x	𩅀	𩅁	𩅂	𩅃	𩅄	𩅅	𩅆	𩅇	𩅈	𩅉	𩅊	𩅋	𩅌	𩅍	𩅎	𩅏
U+2915x	𩅐	𩅑	𩅒	𩅓	𩅔	𩅕	𩅖	𩅗	𩅘	𩅙	𩅚	𩅛	𩅜	𩅝	𩅞	𩅟
U+2916x	𩅠	𩅡	𩅢	𩅣	𩅤	𩅥	𩅦	𩅧	𩅨	𩅩	𩅪	𩅫	𩅬	𩅭	𩅮	𩅯
U+2917x	𩅰	𩅱	𩅲	𩅳	𩅴	𩅵	𩅶	𩅷	𩅸	𩅹	𩅺	𩅻	𩅼	𩅽	𩅾	𩅿
U+2918x	𩆀	𩆁	𩆂	𩆃	𩆄	𩆅	𩆆	𩆇	𩆈	𩆉	𩆊	𩆋	𩆌	𩆍	𩆎	𩆏
U+2919x	𩆐	𩆑	𩆒	𩆓	𩆔	𩆕	𩆖	𩆗	𩆘	𩆙	𩆚	𩆛	𩆜	𩆝	𩆞	𩆟
U+291Ax	𩆠	𩆡	𩆢	𩆣	𩆤	𩆥	𩆦	𩆧	𩆨	𩆩	𩆪	𩆫	𩆬	𩆭	𩆮	𩆯
U+291Bx	𩆰	𩆱	𩆲	𩆳	𩆴	𩆵	𩆶	𩆷	𩆸	𩆹	𩆺	𩆻	𩆼	𩆽	𩆾	𩆿
U+291Cx	𩇀	𩇁	𩇂	𩇃	𩇄	𩇅	𩇆	𩇇	𩇈	𩇉	𩇊	𩇋	𩇌	𩇍	𩇎	𩇏
U+291Dx	𩇐	𩇑	𩇒	𩇓	𩇔	𩇕	𩇖	𩇗	𩇘	𩇙	𩇚	𩇛	𩇜	𩇝	𩇞	𩇟
U+291Ex	𩇠	𩇡	𩇢	𩇣	𩇤	𩇥	𩇦	𩇧	𩇨	𩇩	𩇪	𩇫	𩇬	𩇭	𩇮	𩇯
U+291Fx	𩇰	𩇱	𩇲	𩇳	𩇴	𩇵	𩇶	𩇷	𩇸	𩇹	𩇺	𩇻	𩇼	𩇽	𩇾	𩇿
U+2920x	𩈀	𩈁	𩈂	𩈃	𩈄	𩈅	𩈆	𩈇	𩈈	𩈉	𩈊	𩈋	𩈌	𩈍	𩈎	𩈏
U+2921x	𩈐	𩈑	𩈒	𩈓	𩈔	𩈕	𩈖	𩈗	𩈘	𩈙	𩈚	𩈛	𩈜	𩈝	𩈞	𩈟
U+2922x	𩈠	𩈡	𩈢	𩈣	𩈤	𩈥	𩈦	𩈧	𩈨	𩈩	𩈪	𩈫	𩈬	𩈭	𩈮	𩈯
U+2923x	𩈰	𩈱	𩈲	𩈳	𩈴	𩈵	𩈶	𩈷	𩈸	𩈹	𩈺	𩈻	𩈼	𩈽	𩈾	𩈿
U+2924x	𩉀	𩉁	𩉂	𩉃	𩉄	𩉅	𩉆	𩉇	𩉈	𩉉	𩉊	𩉋	𩉌	𩉍	𩉎	𩉏
U+2925x	𩉐	𩉑	𩉒	𩉓	𩉔	𩉕	𩉖	𩉗	𩉘	𩉙	𩉚	𩉛	𩉜	𩉝	𩉞	𩉟
U+2926x	𩉠	𩉡	𩉢	𩉣	𩉤	𩉥	𩉦	𩉧	𩉨	𩉩	𩉪	𩉫	𩉬	𩉭	𩉮	𩉯
U+2927x	𩉰	𩉱	𩉲	𩉳	𩉴	𩉵	𩉶	𩉷	𩉸	𩉹	𩉺	𩉻	𩉼	𩉽	𩉾	𩉿
U+2928x	𩊀	𩊁	𩊂	𩊃	𩊄	𩊅	𩊆	𩊇	𩊈	𩊉	𩊊	𩊋	𩊌	𩊍	𩊎	𩊏
U+2929x	𩊐	𩊑	𩊒	𩊓	𩊔	𩊕	𩊖	𩊗	𩊘	𩊙	𩊚	𩊛	𩊜	𩊝	𩊞	𩊟
U+292Ax	𩊠	𩊡	𩊢	𩊣	𩊤	𩊥	𩊦	𩊧	𩊨	𩊩	𩊪	𩊫	𩊬	𩊭	𩊮	𩊯
U+292Bx	𩊰	𩊱	𩊲	𩊳	𩊴	𩊵	𩊶	𩊷	𩊸	𩊹	𩊺	𩊻	𩊼	𩊽	𩊾	𩊿
U+292Cx	𩋀	𩋁	𩋂	𩋃	𩋄	𩋅	𩋆	𩋇	𩋈	𩋉	𩋊	𩋋	𩋌	𩋍	𩋎	𩋏
U+292Dx	𩋐	𩋑	𩋒	𩋓	𩋔	𩋕	𩋖	𩋗	𩋘	𩋙	𩋚	𩋛	𩋜	𩋝	𩋞	𩋟
U+292Ex	𩋠	𩋡	𩋢	𩋣	𩋤	𩋥	𩋦	𩋧	𩋨	𩋩	𩋪	𩋫	𩋬	𩋭	𩋮	𩋯
U+292Fx	𩋰	𩋱	𩋲	𩋳	𩋴	𩋵	𩋶	𩋷	𩋸	𩋹	𩋺	𩋻	𩋼	𩋽	𩋾	𩋿
U+2930x	𩌀	𩌁	𩌂	𩌃	𩌄	𩌅	𩌆	𩌇	𩌈	𩌉	𩌊	𩌋	𩌌	𩌍	𩌎	𩌏
U+2931x	𩌐	𩌑	𩌒	𩌓	𩌔	𩌕	𩌖	𩌗	𩌘	𩌙	𩌚	𩌛	𩌜	𩌝	𩌞	𩌟
U+2932x	𩌠	𩌡	𩌢	𩌣	𩌤	𩌥	𩌦	𩌧	𩌨	𩌩	𩌪	𩌫	𩌬	𩌭	𩌮	𩌯
U+2933x	𩌰	𩌱	𩌲	𩌳	𩌴	𩌵	𩌶	𩌷	𩌸	𩌹	𩌺	𩌻	𩌼	𩌽	𩌾	𩌿
U+2934x	𩍀	𩍁	𩍂	𩍃	𩍄	𩍅	𩍆	𩍇	𩍈	𩍉	𩍊	𩍋	𩍌	𩍍	𩍎	𩍏
U+2935x	𩍐	𩍑	𩍒	𩍓	𩍔	𩍕	𩍖	𩍗	𩍘	𩍙	𩍚	𩍛	𩍜	𩍝	𩍞	𩍟
U+2936x	𩍠	𩍡	𩍢	𩍣	𩍤	𩍥	𩍦	𩍧	𩍨	𩍩	𩍪	𩍫	𩍬	𩍭	𩍮	𩍯
U+2937x	𩍰	𩍱	𩍲	𩍳	𩍴	𩍵	𩍶	𩍷	𩍸	𩍹	𩍺	𩍻	𩍼	𩍽	𩍾	𩍿
U+2938x	𩎀	𩎁	𩎂	𩎃	𩎄	𩎅	𩎆	𩎇	𩎈	𩎉	𩎊	𩎋	𩎌	𩎍	𩎎	𩎏
U+2939x	𩎐	𩎑	𩎒	𩎓	𩎔	𩎕	𩎖	𩎗	𩎘	𩎙	𩎚	𩎛	𩎜	𩎝	𩎞	𩎟
U+293Ax	𩎠	𩎡	𩎢	𩎣	𩎤	𩎥	𩎦	𩎧	𩎨	𩎩	𩎪	𩎫	𩎬	𩎭	𩎮	𩎯
U+293Bx	𩎰	𩎱	𩎲	𩎳	𩎴	𩎵	𩎶	𩎷	𩎸	𩎹	𩎺	𩎻	𩎼	𩎽	𩎾	𩎿
U+293Cx	𩏀	𩏁	𩏂	𩏃	𩏄	𩏅	𩏆	𩏇	𩏈	𩏉	𩏊	𩏋	𩏌	𩏍	𩏎	𩏏
U+293Dx	𩏐	𩏑	𩏒	𩏓	𩏔	𩏕	𩏖	𩏗	𩏘	𩏙	𩏚	𩏛	𩏜	𩏝	𩏞	𩏟
U+293Ex	𩏠	𩏡	𩏢	𩏣	𩏤	𩏥	𩏦	𩏧	𩏨	𩏩	𩏪	𩏫	𩏬	𩏭	𩏮	𩏯
U+293Fx	𩏰	𩏱	𩏲	𩏳	𩏴	𩏵	𩏶	𩏷	𩏸	𩏹	𩏺	𩏻	𩏼	𩏽	𩏾	𩏿
U+2940x	𩐀	𩐁	𩐂	𩐃	𩐄	𩐅	𩐆	𩐇	𩐈	𩐉	𩐊	𩐋	𩐌	𩐍	𩐎	𩐏
U+2941x	𩐐	𩐑	𩐒	𩐓	𩐔	𩐕	𩐖	𩐗	𩐘	𩐙	𩐚	𩐛	𩐜	𩐝	𩐞	𩐟
U+2942x	𩐠	𩐡	𩐢	𩐣	𩐤	𩐥	𩐦	𩐧	𩐨	𩐩	𩐪	𩐫	𩐬	𩐭	𩐮	𩐯
U+2943x	𩐰	𩐱	𩐲	𩐳	𩐴	𩐵	𩐶	𩐷	𩐸	𩐹	𩐺	𩐻	𩐼	𩐽	𩐾	𩐿
U+2944x	𩑀	𩑁	𩑂	𩑃	𩑄	𩑅	𩑆	𩑇	𩑈	𩑉	𩑊	𩑋	𩑌	𩑍	𩑎	𩑏
U+2945x	𩑐	𩑑	𩑒	𩑓	𩑔	𩑕	𩑖	𩑗	𩑘	𩑙	𩑚	𩑛	𩑜	𩑝	𩑞	𩑟
U+2946x	𩑠	𩑡	𩑢	𩑣	𩑤	𩑥	𩑦	𩑧	𩑨	𩑩	𩑪	𩑫	𩑬	𩑭	𩑮	𩑯
U+2947x	𩑰	𩑱	𩑲	𩑳	𩑴	𩑵	𩑶	𩑷	𩑸	𩑹	𩑺	𩑻	𩑼	𩑽	𩑾	𩑿
U+2948x	𩒀	𩒁	𩒂	𩒃	𩒄	𩒅	𩒆	𩒇	𩒈	𩒉	𩒊	𩒋	𩒌	𩒍	𩒎	𩒏
U+2949x	𩒐	𩒑	𩒒	𩒓	𩒔	𩒕	𩒖	𩒗	𩒘	𩒙	𩒚	𩒛	𩒜	𩒝	𩒞	𩒟
U+294Ax	𩒠	𩒡	𩒢	𩒣	𩒤	𩒥	𩒦	𩒧	𩒨	𩒩	𩒪	𩒫	𩒬	𩒭	𩒮	𩒯
U+294Bx	𩒰	𩒱	𩒲	𩒳	𩒴	𩒵	𩒶	𩒷	𩒸	𩒹	𩒺	𩒻	𩒼	𩒽	𩒾	𩒿
U+294Cx	𩓀	𩓁	𩓂	𩓃	𩓄	𩓅	𩓆	𩓇	𩓈	𩓉	𩓊	𩓋	𩓌	𩓍	𩓎	𩓏
U+294Dx	𩓐	𩓑	𩓒	𩓓	𩓔	𩓕	𩓖	𩓗	𩓘	𩓙	𩓚	𩓛	𩓜	𩓝	𩓞	𩓟
U+294Ex	𩓠	𩓡	𩓢	𩓣	𩓤	𩓥	𩓦	𩓧	𩓨	𩓩	𩓪	𩓫	𩓬	𩓭	𩓮	𩓯
U+294Fx	𩓰	𩓱	𩓲	𩓳	𩓴	𩓵	𩓶	𩓷	𩓸	𩓹	𩓺	𩓻	𩓼	𩓽	𩓾	𩓿
U+2950x	𩔀	𩔁	𩔂	𩔃	𩔄	𩔅	𩔆	𩔇	𩔈	𩔉	𩔊	𩔋	𩔌	𩔍	𩔎	𩔏
U+2951x	𩔐	𩔑	𩔒	𩔓	𩔔	𩔕	𩔖	𩔗	𩔘	𩔙	𩔚	𩔛	𩔜	𩔝	𩔞	𩔟
U+2952x	𩔠	𩔡	𩔢	𩔣	𩔤	𩔥	𩔦	𩔧	𩔨	𩔩	𩔪	𩔫	𩔬	𩔭	𩔮	𩔯
U+2953x	𩔰	𩔱	𩔲	𩔳	𩔴	𩔵	𩔶	𩔷	𩔸	𩔹	𩔺	𩔻	𩔼	𩔽	𩔾	𩔿
U+2954x	𩕀	𩕁	𩕂	𩕃	𩕄	𩕅	𩕆	𩕇	𩕈	𩕉	𩕊	𩕋	𩕌	𩕍	𩕎	𩕏
U+2955x	𩕐	𩕑	𩕒	𩕓	𩕔	𩕕	𩕖	𩕗	𩕘	𩕙	𩕚	𩕛	𩕜	𩕝	𩕞	𩕟
U+2956x	𩕠	𩕡	𩕢	𩕣	𩕤	𩕥	𩕦	𩕧	𩕨	𩕩	𩕪	𩕫	𩕬	𩕭	𩕮	𩕯
U+2957x	𩕰	𩕱	𩕲	𩕳	𩕴	𩕵	𩕶	𩕷	𩕸	𩕹	𩕺	𩕻	𩕼	𩕽	𩕾	𩕿
U+2958x	𩖀	𩖁	𩖂	𩖃	𩖄	𩖅	𩖆	𩖇	𩖈	𩖉	𩖊	𩖋	𩖌	𩖍	𩖎	𩖏
U+2959x	𩖐	𩖑	𩖒	𩖓	𩖔	𩖕	𩖖	𩖗	𩖘	𩖙	𩖚	𩖛	𩖜	𩖝	𩖞	𩖟
U+295Ax	𩖠	𩖡	𩖢	𩖣	𩖤	𩖥	𩖦	𩖧	𩖨	𩖩	𩖪	𩖫	𩖬	𩖭	𩖮	𩖯
U+295Bx	𩖰	𩖱	𩖲	𩖳	𩖴	𩖵	𩖶	𩖷	𩖸	𩖹	𩖺	𩖻	𩖼	𩖽	𩖾	𩖿
U+295Cx	𩗀	𩗁	𩗂	𩗃	𩗄	𩗅	𩗆	𩗇	𩗈	𩗉	𩗊	𩗋	𩗌	𩗍	𩗎	𩗏
U+295Dx	𩗐	𩗑	𩗒	𩗓	𩗔	𩗕	𩗖	𩗗	𩗘	𩗙	𩗚	𩗛	𩗜	𩗝	𩗞	𩗟
U+295Ex	𩗠	𩗡	𩗢	𩗣	𩗤	𩗥	𩗦	𩗧	𩗨	𩗩	𩗪	𩗫	𩗬	𩗭	𩗮	𩗯
U+295Fx	𩗰	𩗱	𩗲	𩗳	𩗴	𩗵	𩗶	𩗷	𩗸	𩗹	𩗺	𩗻	𩗼	𩗽	𩗾	𩗿
U+2960x	𩘀	𩘁	𩘂	𩘃	𩘄	𩘅	𩘆	𩘇	𩘈	𩘉	𩘊	𩘋	𩘌	𩘍	𩘎	𩘏
U+2961x	𩘐	𩘑	𩘒	𩘓	𩘔	𩘕	𩘖	𩘗	𩘘	𩘙	𩘚	𩘛	𩘜	𩘝	𩘞	𩘟
U+2962x	𩘠	𩘡	𩘢	𩘣	𩘤	𩘥	𩘦	𩘧	𩘨	𩘩	𩘪	𩘫	𩘬	𩘭	𩘮	𩘯
U+2963x	𩘰	𩘱	𩘲	𩘳	𩘴	𩘵	𩘶	𩘷	𩘸	𩘹	𩘺	𩘻	𩘼	𩘽	𩘾	𩘿
U+2964x	𩙀	𩙁	𩙂	𩙃	𩙄	𩙅	𩙆	𩙇	𩙈	𩙉	𩙊	𩙋	𩙌	𩙍	𩙎	𩙏
U+2965x	𩙐	𩙑	𩙒	𩙓	𩙔	𩙕	𩙖	𩙗	𩙘	𩙙	𩙚	𩙛	𩙜	𩙝	𩙞	𩙟
U+2966x	𩙠	𩙡	𩙢	𩙣	𩙤	𩙥	𩙦	𩙧	𩙨	𩙩	𩙪	𩙫	𩙬	𩙭	𩙮	𩙯
U+2967x	𩙰	𩙱	𩙲	𩙳	𩙴	𩙵	𩙶	𩙷	𩙸	𩙹	𩙺	𩙻	𩙼	𩙽	𩙾	𩙿
U+2968x	𩚀	𩚁	𩚂	𩚃	𩚄	𩚅	𩚆	𩚇	𩚈	𩚉	𩚊	𩚋	𩚌	𩚍	𩚎	𩚏
U+2969x	𩚐	𩚑	𩚒	𩚓	𩚔	𩚕	𩚖	𩚗	𩚘	𩚙	𩚚	𩚛	𩚜	𩚝	𩚞	𩚟
U+296Ax	𩚠	𩚡	𩚢	𩚣	𩚤	𩚥	𩚦	𩚧	𩚨	𩚩	𩚪	𩚫	𩚬	𩚭	𩚮	𩚯
U+296Bx	𩚰	𩚱	𩚲	𩚳	𩚴	𩚵	𩚶	𩚷	𩚸	𩚹	𩚺	𩚻	𩚼	𩚽	𩚾	𩚿
U+296Cx	𩛀	𩛁	𩛂	𩛃	𩛄	𩛅	𩛆	𩛇	𩛈	𩛉	𩛊	𩛋	𩛌	𩛍	𩛎	𩛏
U+296Dx	𩛐	𩛑	𩛒	𩛓	𩛔	𩛕	𩛖	𩛗	𩛘	𩛙	𩛚	𩛛	𩛜	𩛝	𩛞	𩛟
U+296Ex	𩛠	𩛡	𩛢	𩛣	𩛤	𩛥	𩛦	𩛧	𩛨	𩛩	𩛪	𩛫	𩛬	𩛭	𩛮	𩛯
U+296Fx	𩛰	𩛱	𩛲	𩛳	𩛴	𩛵	𩛶	𩛷	𩛸	𩛹	𩛺	𩛻	𩛼	𩛽	𩛾	𩛿
U+2970x	𩜀	𩜁	𩜂	𩜃	𩜄	𩜅	𩜆	𩜇	𩜈	𩜉	𩜊	𩜋	𩜌	𩜍	𩜎	𩜏
U+2971x	𩜐	𩜑	𩜒	𩜓	𩜔	𩜕	𩜖	𩜗	𩜘	𩜙	𩜚	𩜛	𩜜	𩜝	𩜞	𩜟
U+2972x	𩜠	𩜡	𩜢	𩜣	𩜤	𩜥	𩜦	𩜧	𩜨	𩜩	𩜪	𩜫	𩜬	𩜭	𩜮	𩜯
U+2973x	𩜰	𩜱	𩜲	𩜳	𩜴	𩜵	𩜶	𩜷	𩜸	𩜹	𩜺	𩜻	𩜼	𩜽	𩜾	𩜿
U+2974x	𩝀	𩝁	𩝂	𩝃	𩝄	𩝅	𩝆	𩝇	𩝈	𩝉	𩝊	𩝋	𩝌	𩝍	𩝎	𩝏
U+2975x	𩝐	𩝑	𩝒	𩝓	𩝔	𩝕	𩝖	𩝗	𩝘	𩝙	𩝚	𩝛	𩝜	𩝝	𩝞	𩝟
U+2976x	𩝠	𩝡	𩝢	𩝣	𩝤	𩝥	𩝦	𩝧	𩝨	𩝩	𩝪	𩝫	𩝬	𩝭	𩝮	𩝯
U+2977x	𩝰	𩝱	𩝲	𩝳	𩝴	𩝵	𩝶	𩝷	𩝸	𩝹	𩝺	𩝻	𩝼	𩝽	𩝾	𩝿
U+2978x	𩞀	𩞁	𩞂	𩞃	𩞄	𩞅	𩞆	𩞇	𩞈	𩞉	𩞊	𩞋	𩞌	𩞍	𩞎	𩞏
U+2979x	𩞐	𩞑	𩞒	𩞓	𩞔	𩞕	𩞖	𩞗	𩞘	𩞙	𩞚	𩞛	𩞜	𩞝	𩞞	𩞟
U+297Ax	𩞠	𩞡	𩞢	𩞣	𩞤	𩞥	𩞦	𩞧	𩞨	𩞩	𩞪	𩞫	𩞬	𩞭	𩞮	𩞯
U+297Bx	𩞰	𩞱	𩞲	𩞳	𩞴	𩞵	𩞶	𩞷	𩞸	𩞹	𩞺	𩞻	𩞼	𩞽	𩞾	𩞿
U+297Cx	𩟀	𩟁	𩟂	𩟃	𩟄	𩟅	𩟆	𩟇	𩟈	𩟉	𩟊	𩟋	𩟌	𩟍	𩟎	𩟏
U+297Dx	𩟐	𩟑	𩟒	𩟓	𩟔	𩟕	𩟖	𩟗	𩟘	𩟙	𩟚	𩟛	𩟜	𩟝	𩟞	𩟟
U+297Ex	𩟠	𩟡	𩟢	𩟣	𩟤	𩟥	𩟦	𩟧	𩟨	𩟩	𩟪	𩟫	𩟬	𩟭	𩟮	𩟯
U+297Fx	𩟰	𩟱	𩟲	𩟳	𩟴	𩟵	𩟶	𩟷	𩟸	𩟹	𩟺	𩟻	𩟼	𩟽	𩟾	𩟿
U+2980x	𩠀	𩠁	𩠂	𩠃	𩠄	𩠅	𩠆	𩠇	𩠈	𩠉	𩠊	𩠋	𩠌	𩠍	𩠎	𩠏
U+2981x	𩠐	𩠑	𩠒	𩠓	𩠔	𩠕	𩠖	𩠗	𩠘	𩠙	𩠚	𩠛	𩠜	𩠝	𩠞	𩠟
U+2982x	𩠠	𩠡	𩠢	𩠣	𩠤	𩠥	𩠦	𩠧	𩠨	𩠩	𩠪	𩠫	𩠬	𩠭	𩠮	𩠯
U+2983x	𩠰	𩠱	𩠲	𩠳	𩠴	𩠵	𩠶	𩠷	𩠸	𩠹	𩠺	𩠻	𩠼	𩠽	𩠾	𩠿
U+2984x	𩡀	𩡁	𩡂	𩡃	𩡄	𩡅	𩡆	𩡇	𩡈	𩡉	𩡊	𩡋	𩡌	𩡍	𩡎	𩡏
U+2985x	𩡐	𩡑	𩡒	𩡓	𩡔	𩡕	𩡖	𩡗	𩡘	𩡙	𩡚	𩡛	𩡜	𩡝	𩡞	𩡟
U+2986x	𩡠	𩡡	𩡢	𩡣	𩡤	𩡥	𩡦	𩡧	𩡨	𩡩	𩡪	𩡫	𩡬	𩡭	𩡮	𩡯
U+2987x	𩡰	𩡱	𩡲	𩡳	𩡴	𩡵	𩡶	𩡷	𩡸	𩡹	𩡺	𩡻	𩡼	𩡽	𩡾	𩡿
U+2988x	𩢀	𩢁	𩢂	𩢃	𩢄	𩢅	𩢆	𩢇	𩢈	𩢉	𩢊	𩢋	𩢌	𩢍	𩢎	𩢏
U+2989x	𩢐	𩢑	𩢒	𩢓	𩢔	𩢕	𩢖	𩢗	𩢘	𩢙	𩢚	𩢛	𩢜	𩢝	𩢞	𩢟
U+298Ax	𩢠	𩢡	𩢢	𩢣	𩢤	𩢥	𩢦	𩢧	𩢨	𩢩	𩢪	𩢫	𩢬	𩢭	𩢮	𩢯
U+298Bx	𩢰	𩢱	𩢲	𩢳	𩢴	𩢵	𩢶	𩢷	𩢸	𩢹	𩢺	𩢻	𩢼	𩢽	𩢾	𩢿
U+298Cx	𩣀	𩣁	𩣂	𩣃	𩣄	𩣅	𩣆	𩣇	𩣈	𩣉	𩣊	𩣋	𩣌	𩣍	𩣎	𩣏
U+298Dx	𩣐	𩣑	𩣒	𩣓	𩣔	𩣕	𩣖	𩣗	𩣘	𩣙	𩣚	𩣛	𩣜	𩣝	𩣞	𩣟
U+298Ex	𩣠	𩣡	𩣢	𩣣	𩣤	𩣥	𩣦	𩣧	𩣨	𩣩	𩣪	𩣫	𩣬	𩣭	𩣮	𩣯
U+298Fx	𩣰	𩣱	𩣲	𩣳	𩣴	𩣵	𩣶	𩣷	𩣸	𩣹	𩣺	𩣻	𩣼	𩣽	𩣾	𩣿
U+2990x	𩤀	𩤁	𩤂	𩤃	𩤄	𩤅	𩤆	𩤇	𩤈	𩤉	𩤊	𩤋	𩤌	𩤍	𩤎	𩤏
U+2991x	𩤐	𩤑	𩤒	𩤓	𩤔	𩤕	𩤖	𩤗	𩤘	𩤙	𩤚	𩤛	𩤜	𩤝	𩤞	𩤟
U+2992x	𩤠	𩤡	𩤢	𩤣	𩤤	𩤥	𩤦	𩤧	𩤨	𩤩	𩤪	𩤫	𩤬	𩤭	𩤮	𩤯
U+2993x	𩤰	𩤱	𩤲	𩤳	𩤴	𩤵	𩤶	𩤷	𩤸	𩤹	𩤺	𩤻	𩤼	𩤽	𩤾	𩤿
U+2994x	𩥀	𩥁	𩥂	𩥃	𩥄	𩥅	𩥆	𩥇	𩥈	𩥉	𩥊	𩥋	𩥌	𩥍	𩥎	𩥏
U+2995x	𩥐	𩥑	𩥒	𩥓	𩥔	𩥕	𩥖	𩥗	𩥘	𩥙	𩥚	𩥛	𩥜	𩥝	𩥞	𩥟
U+2996x	𩥠	𩥡	𩥢	𩥣	𩥤	𩥥	𩥦	𩥧	𩥨	𩥩	𩥪	𩥫	𩥬	𩥭	𩥮	𩥯
U+2997x	𩥰	𩥱	𩥲	𩥳	𩥴	𩥵	𩥶	𩥷	𩥸	𩥹	𩥺	𩥻	𩥼	𩥽	𩥾	𩥿
U+2998x	𩦀	𩦁	𩦂	𩦃	𩦄	𩦅	𩦆	𩦇	𩦈	𩦉	𩦊	𩦋	𩦌	𩦍	𩦎	𩦏
U+2999x	𩦐	𩦑	𩦒	𩦓	𩦔	𩦕	𩦖	𩦗	𩦘	𩦙	𩦚	𩦛	𩦜	𩦝	𩦞	𩦟
U+299Ax	𩦠	𩦡	𩦢	𩦣	𩦤	𩦥	𩦦	𩦧	𩦨	𩦩	𩦪	𩦫	𩦬	𩦭	𩦮	𩦯
U+299Bx	𩦰	𩦱	𩦲	𩦳	𩦴	𩦵	𩦶	𩦷	𩦸	𩦹	𩦺	𩦻	𩦼	𩦽	𩦾	𩦿
U+299Cx	𩧀	𩧁	𩧂	𩧃	𩧄	𩧅	𩧆	𩧇	𩧈	𩧉	𩧊	𩧋	𩧌	𩧍	𩧎	𩧏
U+299Dx	𩧐	𩧑	𩧒	𩧓	𩧔	𩧕	𩧖	𩧗	𩧘	𩧙	𩧚	𩧛	𩧜	𩧝	𩧞	𩧟
U+299Ex	𩧠	𩧡	𩧢	𩧣	𩧤	𩧥	𩧦	𩧧	𩧨	𩧩	𩧪	𩧫	𩧬	𩧭	𩧮	𩧯
U+299Fx	𩧰	𩧱	𩧲	𩧳	𩧴	𩧵	𩧶	𩧷	𩧸	𩧹	𩧺	𩧻	𩧼	𩧽	𩧾	𩧿
U+29A0x	𩨀	𩨁	𩨂	𩨃	𩨄	𩨅	𩨆	𩨇	𩨈	𩨉	𩨊	𩨋	𩨌	𩨍	𩨎	𩨏
U+29A1x	𩨐	𩨑	𩨒	𩨓	𩨔	𩨕	𩨖	𩨗	𩨘	𩨙	𩨚	𩨛	𩨜	𩨝	𩨞	𩨟
U+29A2x	𩨠	𩨡	𩨢	𩨣	𩨤	𩨥	𩨦	𩨧	𩨨	𩨩	𩨪	𩨫	𩨬	𩨭	𩨮	𩨯
U+29A3x	𩨰	𩨱	𩨲	𩨳	𩨴	𩨵	𩨶	𩨷	𩨸	𩨹	𩨺	𩨻	𩨼	𩨽	𩨾	𩨿
U+29A4x	𩩀	𩩁	𩩂	𩩃	𩩄	𩩅	𩩆	𩩇	𩩈	𩩉	𩩊	𩩋	𩩌	𩩍	𩩎	𩩏
U+29A5x	𩩐	𩩑	𩩒	𩩓	𩩔	𩩕	𩩖	𩩗	𩩘	𩩙	𩩚	𩩛	𩩜	𩩝	𩩞	𩩟
U+29A6x	𩩠	𩩡	𩩢	𩩣	𩩤	𩩥	𩩦	𩩧	𩩨	𩩩	𩩪	𩩫	𩩬	𩩭	𩩮	𩩯
U+29A7x	𩩰	𩩱	𩩲	𩩳	𩩴	𩩵	𩩶	𩩷	𩩸	𩩹	𩩺	𩩻	𩩼	𩩽	𩩾	𩩿
U+29A8x	𩪀	𩪁	𩪂	𩪃	𩪄	𩪅	𩪆	𩪇	𩪈	𩪉	𩪊	𩪋	𩪌	𩪍	𩪎	𩪏
U+29A9x	𩪐	𩪑	𩪒	𩪓	𩪔	𩪕	𩪖	𩪗	𩪘	𩪙	𩪚	𩪛	𩪜	𩪝	𩪞	𩪟
U+29AAx	𩪠	𩪡	𩪢	𩪣	𩪤	𩪥	𩪦	𩪧	𩪨	𩪩	𩪪	𩪫	𩪬	𩪭	𩪮	𩪯
U+29ABx	𩪰	𩪱	𩪲	𩪳	𩪴	𩪵	𩪶	𩪷	𩪸	𩪹	𩪺	𩪻	𩪼	𩪽	𩪾	𩪿
U+29ACx	𩫀	𩫁	𩫂	𩫃	𩫄	𩫅	𩫆	𩫇	𩫈	𩫉	𩫊	𩫋	𩫌	𩫍	𩫎	𩫏
U+29ADx	𩫐	𩫑	𩫒	𩫓	𩫔	𩫕	𩫖	𩫗	𩫘	𩫙	𩫚	𩫛	𩫜	𩫝	𩫞	𩫟
U+29AEx	𩫠	𩫡	𩫢	𩫣	𩫤	𩫥	𩫦	𩫧	𩫨	𩫩	𩫪	𩫫	𩫬	𩫭	𩫮	𩫯
U+29AFx	𩫰	𩫱	𩫲	𩫳	𩫴	𩫵	𩫶	𩫷	𩫸	𩫹	𩫺	𩫻	𩫼	𩫽	𩫾	𩫿
U+29B0x	𩬀	𩬁	𩬂	𩬃	𩬄	𩬅	𩬆	𩬇	𩬈	𩬉	𩬊	𩬋	𩬌	𩬍	𩬎	𩬏
U+29B1x	𩬐	𩬑	𩬒	𩬓	𩬔	𩬕	𩬖	𩬗	𩬘	𩬙	𩬚	𩬛	𩬜	𩬝	𩬞	𩬟
U+29B2x	𩬠	𩬡	𩬢	𩬣	𩬤	𩬥	𩬦	𩬧	𩬨	𩬩	𩬪	𩬫	𩬬	𩬭	𩬮	𩬯
U+29B3x	𩬰	𩬱	𩬲	𩬳	𩬴	𩬵	𩬶	𩬷	𩬸	𩬹	𩬺	𩬻	𩬼	𩬽	𩬾	𩬿
U+29B4x	𩭀	𩭁	𩭂	𩭃	𩭄	𩭅	𩭆	𩭇	𩭈	𩭉	𩭊	𩭋	𩭌	𩭍	𩭎	𩭏
U+29B5x	𩭐	𩭑	𩭒	𩭓	𩭔	𩭕	𩭖	𩭗	𩭘	𩭙	𩭚	𩭛	𩭜	𩭝	𩭞	𩭟
U+29B6x	𩭠	𩭡	𩭢	𩭣	𩭤	𩭥	𩭦	𩭧	𩭨	𩭩	𩭪	𩭫	𩭬	𩭭	𩭮	𩭯
U+29B7x	𩭰	𩭱	𩭲	𩭳	𩭴	𩭵	𩭶	𩭷	𩭸	𩭹	𩭺	𩭻	𩭼	𩭽	𩭾	𩭿
U+29B8x	𩮀	𩮁	𩮂	𩮃	𩮄	𩮅	𩮆	𩮇	𩮈	𩮉	𩮊	𩮋	𩮌	𩮍	𩮎	𩮏
U+29B9x	𩮐	𩮑	𩮒	𩮓	𩮔	𩮕	𩮖	𩮗	𩮘	𩮙	𩮚	𩮛	𩮜	𩮝	𩮞	𩮟
U+29BAx	𩮠	𩮡	𩮢	𩮣	𩮤	𩮥	𩮦	𩮧	𩮨	𩮩	𩮪	𩮫	𩮬	𩮭	𩮮	𩮯
U+29BBx	𩮰	𩮱	𩮲	𩮳	𩮴	𩮵	𩮶	𩮷	𩮸	𩮹	𩮺	𩮻	𩮼	𩮽	𩮾	𩮿
U+29BCx	𩯀	𩯁	𩯂	𩯃	𩯄	𩯅	𩯆	𩯇	𩯈	𩯉	𩯊	𩯋	𩯌	𩯍	𩯎	𩯏
U+29BDx	𩯐	𩯑	𩯒	𩯓	𩯔	𩯕	𩯖	𩯗	𩯘	𩯙	𩯚	𩯛	𩯜	𩯝	𩯞	𩯟
U+29BEx	𩯠	𩯡	𩯢	𩯣	𩯤	𩯥	𩯦	𩯧	𩯨	𩯩	𩯪	𩯫	𩯬	𩯭	𩯮	𩯯
U+29BFx	𩯰	𩯱	𩯲	𩯳	𩯴	𩯵	𩯶	𩯷	𩯸	𩯹	𩯺	𩯻	𩯼	𩯽	𩯾	𩯿
U+29C0x	𩰀	𩰁	𩰂	𩰃	𩰄	𩰅	𩰆	𩰇	𩰈	𩰉	𩰊	𩰋	𩰌	𩰍	𩰎	𩰏
U+29C1x	𩰐	𩰑	𩰒	𩰓	𩰔	𩰕	𩰖	𩰗	𩰘	𩰙	𩰚	𩰛	𩰜	𩰝	𩰞	𩰟
U+29C2x	𩰠	𩰡	𩰢	𩰣	𩰤	𩰥	𩰦	𩰧	𩰨	𩰩	𩰪	𩰫	𩰬	𩰭	𩰮	𩰯
U+29C3x	𩰰	𩰱	𩰲	𩰳	𩰴	𩰵	𩰶	𩰷	𩰸	𩰹	𩰺	𩰻	𩰼	𩰽	𩰾	𩰿
U+29C4x	𩱀	𩱁	𩱂	𩱃	𩱄	𩱅	𩱆	𩱇	𩱈	𩱉	𩱊	𩱋	𩱌	𩱍	𩱎	𩱏
U+29C5x	𩱐	𩱑	𩱒	𩱓	𩱔	𩱕	𩱖	𩱗	𩱘	𩱙	𩱚	𩱛	𩱜	𩱝	𩱞	𩱟
U+29C6x	𩱠	𩱡	𩱢	𩱣	𩱤	𩱥	𩱦	𩱧	𩱨	𩱩	𩱪	𩱫	𩱬	𩱭	𩱮	𩱯
U+29C7x	𩱰	𩱱	𩱲	𩱳	𩱴	𩱵	𩱶	𩱷	𩱸	𩱹	𩱺	𩱻	𩱼	𩱽	𩱾	𩱿
U+29C8x	𩲀	𩲁	𩲂	𩲃	𩲄	𩲅	𩲆	𩲇	𩲈	𩲉	𩲊	𩲋	𩲌	𩲍	𩲎	𩲏
U+29C9x	𩲐	𩲑	𩲒	𩲓	𩲔	𩲕	𩲖	𩲗	𩲘	𩲙	𩲚	𩲛	𩲜	𩲝	𩲞	𩲟
U+29CAx	𩲠	𩲡	𩲢	𩲣	𩲤	𩲥	𩲦	𩲧	𩲨	𩲩	𩲪	𩲫	𩲬	𩲭	𩲮	𩲯
U+29CBx	𩲰	𩲱	𩲲	𩲳	𩲴	𩲵	𩲶	𩲷	𩲸	𩲹	𩲺	𩲻	𩲼	𩲽	𩲾	𩲿
U+29CCx	𩳀	𩳁	𩳂	𩳃	𩳄	𩳅	𩳆	𩳇	𩳈	𩳉	𩳊	𩳋	𩳌	𩳍	𩳎	𩳏
U+29CDx	𩳐	𩳑	𩳒	𩳓	𩳔	𩳕	𩳖	𩳗	𩳘	𩳙	𩳚	𩳛	𩳜	𩳝	𩳞	𩳟
U+29CEx	𩳠	𩳡	𩳢	𩳣	𩳤	𩳥	𩳦	𩳧	𩳨	𩳩	𩳪	𩳫	𩳬	𩳭	𩳮	𩳯
U+29CFx	𩳰	𩳱	𩳲	𩳳	𩳴	𩳵	𩳶	𩳷	𩳸	𩳹	𩳺	𩳻	𩳼	𩳽	𩳾	𩳿
U+29D0x	𩴀	𩴁	𩴂	𩴃	𩴄	𩴅	𩴆	𩴇	𩴈	𩴉	𩴊	𩴋	𩴌	𩴍	𩴎	𩴏
U+29D1x	𩴐	𩴑	𩴒	𩴓	𩴔	𩴕	𩴖	𩴗	𩴘	𩴙	𩴚	𩴛	𩴜	𩴝	𩴞	𩴟
U+29D2x	𩴠	𩴡	𩴢	𩴣	𩴤	𩴥	𩴦	𩴧	𩴨	𩴩	𩴪	𩴫	𩴬	𩴭	𩴮	𩴯
U+29D3x	𩴰	𩴱	𩴲	𩴳	𩴴	𩴵	𩴶	𩴷	𩴸	𩴹	𩴺	𩴻	𩴼	𩴽	𩴾	𩴿
U+29D4x	𩵀	𩵁	𩵂	𩵃	𩵄	𩵅	𩵆	𩵇	𩵈	𩵉	𩵊	𩵋	𩵌	𩵍	𩵎	𩵏
U+29D5x	𩵐	𩵑	𩵒	𩵓	𩵔	𩵕	𩵖	𩵗	𩵘	𩵙	𩵚	𩵛	𩵜	𩵝	𩵞	𩵟
U+29D6x	𩵠	𩵡	𩵢	𩵣	𩵤	𩵥	𩵦	𩵧	𩵨	𩵩	𩵪	𩵫	𩵬	𩵭	𩵮	𩵯
U+29D7x	𩵰	𩵱	𩵲	𩵳	𩵴	𩵵	𩵶	𩵷	𩵸	𩵹	𩵺	𩵻	𩵼	𩵽	𩵾	𩵿
U+29D8x	𩶀	𩶁	𩶂	𩶃	𩶄	𩶅	𩶆	𩶇	𩶈	𩶉	𩶊	𩶋	𩶌	𩶍	𩶎	𩶏
U+29D9x	𩶐	𩶑	𩶒	𩶓	𩶔	𩶕	𩶖	𩶗	𩶘	𩶙	𩶚	𩶛	𩶜	𩶝	𩶞	𩶟
U+29DAx	𩶠	𩶡	𩶢	𩶣	𩶤	𩶥	𩶦	𩶧	𩶨	𩶩	𩶪	𩶫	𩶬	𩶭	𩶮	𩶯
U+29DBx	𩶰	𩶱	𩶲	𩶳	𩶴	𩶵	𩶶	𩶷	𩶸	𩶹	𩶺	𩶻	𩶼	𩶽	𩶾	𩶿
U+29DCx	𩷀	𩷁	𩷂	𩷃	𩷄	𩷅	𩷆	𩷇	𩷈	𩷉	𩷊	𩷋	𩷌	𩷍	𩷎	𩷏
U+29DDx	𩷐	𩷑	𩷒	𩷓	𩷔	𩷕	𩷖	𩷗	𩷘	𩷙	𩷚	𩷛	𩷜	𩷝	𩷞	𩷟
U+29DEx	𩷠	𩷡	𩷢	𩷣	𩷤	𩷥	𩷦	𩷧	𩷨	𩷩	𩷪	𩷫	𩷬	𩷭	𩷮	𩷯
U+29DFx	𩷰	𩷱	𩷲	𩷳	𩷴	𩷵	𩷶	𩷷	𩷸	𩷹	𩷺	𩷻	𩷼	𩷽	𩷾	𩷿
U+29E0x	𩸀	𩸁	𩸂	𩸃	𩸄	𩸅	𩸆	𩸇	𩸈	𩸉	𩸊	𩸋	𩸌	𩸍	𩸎	𩸏
U+29E1x	𩸐	𩸑	𩸒	𩸓	𩸔	𩸕	𩸖	𩸗	𩸘	𩸙	𩸚	𩸛	𩸜	𩸝	𩸞	𩸟
U+29E2x	𩸠	𩸡	𩸢	𩸣	𩸤	𩸥	𩸦	𩸧	𩸨	𩸩	𩸪	𩸫	𩸬	𩸭	𩸮	𩸯
U+29E3x	𩸰	𩸱	𩸲	𩸳	𩸴	𩸵	𩸶	𩸷	𩸸	𩸹	𩸺	𩸻	𩸼	𩸽	𩸾	𩸿
U+29E4x	𩹀	𩹁	𩹂	𩹃	𩹄	𩹅	𩹆	𩹇	𩹈	𩹉	𩹊	𩹋	𩹌	𩹍	𩹎	𩹏
U+29E5x	𩹐	𩹑	𩹒	𩹓	𩹔	𩹕	𩹖	𩹗	𩹘	𩹙	𩹚	𩹛	𩹜	𩹝	𩹞	𩹟
U+29E6x	𩹠	𩹡	𩹢	𩹣	𩹤	𩹥	𩹦	𩹧	𩹨	𩹩	𩹪	𩹫	𩹬	𩹭	𩹮	𩹯
U+29E7x	𩹰	𩹱	𩹲	𩹳	𩹴	𩹵	𩹶	𩹷	𩹸	𩹹	𩹺	𩹻	𩹼	𩹽	𩹾	𩹿
U+29E8x	𩺀	𩺁	𩺂	𩺃	𩺄	𩺅	𩺆	𩺇	𩺈	𩺉	𩺊	𩺋	𩺌	𩺍	𩺎	𩺏
U+29E9x	𩺐	𩺑	𩺒	𩺓	𩺔	𩺕	𩺖	𩺗	𩺘	𩺙	𩺚	𩺛	𩺜	𩺝	𩺞	𩺟
U+29EAx	𩺠	𩺡	𩺢	𩺣	𩺤	𩺥	𩺦	𩺧	𩺨	𩺩	𩺪	𩺫	𩺬	𩺭	𩺮	𩺯
U+29EBx	𩺰	𩺱	𩺲	𩺳	𩺴	𩺵	𩺶	𩺷	𩺸	𩺹	𩺺	𩺻	𩺼	𩺽	𩺾	𩺿
U+29ECx	𩻀	𩻁	𩻂	𩻃	𩻄	𩻅	𩻆	𩻇	𩻈	𩻉	𩻊	𩻋	𩻌	𩻍	𩻎	𩻏
U+29EDx	𩻐	𩻑	𩻒	𩻓	𩻔	𩻕	𩻖	𩻗	𩻘	𩻙	𩻚	𩻛	𩻜	𩻝	𩻞	𩻟
U+29EEx	𩻠	𩻡	𩻢	𩻣	𩻤	𩻥	𩻦	𩻧	𩻨	𩻩	𩻪	𩻫	𩻬	𩻭	𩻮	𩻯
U+29EFx	𩻰	𩻱	𩻲	𩻳	𩻴	𩻵	𩻶	𩻷	𩻸	𩻹	𩻺	𩻻	𩻼	𩻽	𩻾	𩻿
U+29F0x	𩼀	𩼁	𩼂	𩼃	𩼄	𩼅	𩼆	𩼇	𩼈	𩼉	𩼊	𩼋	𩼌	𩼍	𩼎	𩼏
U+29F1x	𩼐	𩼑	𩼒	𩼓	𩼔	𩼕	𩼖	𩼗	𩼘	𩼙	𩼚	𩼛	𩼜	𩼝	𩼞	𩼟
U+29F2x	𩼠	𩼡	𩼢	𩼣	𩼤	𩼥	𩼦	𩼧	𩼨	𩼩	𩼪	𩼫	𩼬	𩼭	𩼮	𩼯
U+29F3x	𩼰	𩼱	𩼲	𩼳	𩼴	𩼵	𩼶	𩼷	𩼸	𩼹	𩼺	𩼻	𩼼	𩼽	𩼾	𩼿
U+29F4x	𩽀	𩽁	𩽂	𩽃	𩽄	𩽅	𩽆	𩽇	𩽈	𩽉	𩽊	𩽋	𩽌	𩽍	𩽎	𩽏
U+29F5x	𩽐	𩽑	𩽒	𩽓	𩽔	𩽕	𩽖	𩽗	𩽘	𩽙	𩽚	𩽛	𩽜	𩽝	𩽞	𩽟
U+29F6x	𩽠	𩽡	𩽢	𩽣	𩽤	𩽥	𩽦	𩽧	𩽨	𩽩	𩽪	𩽫	𩽬	𩽭	𩽮	𩽯
U+29F7x	𩽰	𩽱	𩽲	𩽳	𩽴	𩽵	𩽶	𩽷	𩽸	𩽹	𩽺	𩽻	𩽼	𩽽	𩽾	𩽿
U+29F8x	𩾀	𩾁	𩾂	𩾃	𩾄	𩾅	𩾆	𩾇	𩾈	𩾉	𩾊	𩾋	𩾌	𩾍	𩾎	𩾏
U+29F9x	𩾐	𩾑	𩾒	𩾓	𩾔	𩾕	𩾖	𩾗	𩾘	𩾙	𩾚	𩾛	𩾜	𩾝	𩾞	𩾟
U+29FAx	𩾠	𩾡	𩾢	𩾣	𩾤	𩾥	𩾦	𩾧	𩾨	𩾩	𩾪	𩾫	𩾬	𩾭	𩾮	𩾯
U+29FBx	𩾰	𩾱	𩾲	𩾳	𩾴	𩾵	𩾶	𩾷	𩾸	𩾹	𩾺	𩾻	𩾼	𩾽	𩾾	𩾿
U+29FCx	𩿀	𩿁	𩿂	𩿃	𩿄	𩿅	𩿆	𩿇	𩿈	𩿉	𩿊	𩿋	𩿌	𩿍	𩿎	𩿏
U+29FDx	𩿐	𩿑	𩿒	𩿓	𩿔	𩿕	𩿖	𩿗	𩿘	𩿙	𩿚	𩿛	𩿜	𩿝	𩿞	𩿟
U+29FEx	𩿠	𩿡	𩿢	𩿣	𩿤	𩿥	𩿦	𩿧	𩿨	𩿩	𩿪	𩿫	𩿬	𩿭	𩿮	𩿯
U+29FFx	𩿰	𩿱	𩿲	𩿳	𩿴	𩿵	𩿶	𩿷	𩿸	𩿹	𩿺	𩿻	𩿼	𩿽	𩿾	𩿿
U+2A00x	𪀀	𪀁	𪀂	𪀃	𪀄	𪀅	𪀆	𪀇	𪀈	𪀉	𪀊	𪀋	𪀌	𪀍	𪀎	𪀏
U+2A01x	𪀐	𪀑	𪀒	𪀓	𪀔	𪀕	𪀖	𪀗	𪀘	𪀙	𪀚	𪀛	𪀜	𪀝	𪀞	𪀟
U+2A02x	𪀠	𪀡	𪀢	𪀣	𪀤	𪀥	𪀦	𪀧	𪀨	𪀩	𪀪	𪀫	𪀬	𪀭	𪀮	𪀯
U+2A03x	𪀰	𪀱	𪀲	𪀳	𪀴	𪀵	𪀶	𪀷	𪀸	𪀹	𪀺	𪀻	𪀼	𪀽	𪀾	𪀿
U+2A04x	𪁀	𪁁	𪁂	𪁃	𪁄	𪁅	𪁆	𪁇	𪁈	𪁉	𪁊	𪁋	𪁌	𪁍	𪁎	𪁏
U+2A05x	𪁐	𪁑	𪁒	𪁓	𪁔	𪁕	𪁖	𪁗	𪁘	𪁙	𪁚	𪁛	𪁜	𪁝	𪁞	𪁟
U+2A06x	𪁠	𪁡	𪁢	𪁣	𪁤	𪁥	𪁦	𪁧	𪁨	𪁩	𪁪	𪁫	𪁬	𪁭	𪁮	𪁯
U+2A07x	𪁰	𪁱	𪁲	𪁳	𪁴	𪁵	𪁶	𪁷	𪁸	𪁹	𪁺	𪁻	𪁼	𪁽	𪁾	𪁿
U+2A08x	𪂀	𪂁	𪂂	𪂃	𪂄	𪂅	𪂆	𪂇	𪂈	𪂉	𪂊	𪂋	𪂌	𪂍	𪂎	𪂏
U+2A09x	𪂐	𪂑	𪂒	𪂓	𪂔	𪂕	𪂖	𪂗	𪂘	𪂙	𪂚	𪂛	𪂜	𪂝	𪂞	𪂟
U+2A0Ax	𪂠	𪂡	𪂢	𪂣	𪂤	𪂥	𪂦	𪂧	𪂨	𪂩	𪂪	𪂫	𪂬	𪂭	𪂮	𪂯
U+2A0Bx	𪂰	𪂱	𪂲	𪂳	𪂴	𪂵	𪂶	𪂷	𪂸	𪂹	𪂺	𪂻	𪂼	𪂽	𪂾	𪂿
U+2A0Cx	𪃀	𪃁	𪃂	𪃃	𪃄	𪃅	𪃆	𪃇	𪃈	𪃉	𪃊	𪃋	𪃌	𪃍	𪃎	𪃏
U+2A0Dx	𪃐	𪃑	𪃒	𪃓	𪃔	𪃕	𪃖	𪃗	𪃘	𪃙	𪃚	𪃛	𪃜	𪃝	𪃞	𪃟
U+2A0Ex	𪃠	𪃡	𪃢	𪃣	𪃤	𪃥	𪃦	𪃧	𪃨	𪃩	𪃪	𪃫	𪃬	𪃭	𪃮	𪃯
U+2A0Fx	𪃰	𪃱	𪃲	𪃳	𪃴	𪃵	𪃶	𪃷	𪃸	𪃹	𪃺	𪃻	𪃼	𪃽	𪃾	𪃿
U+2A10x	𪄀	𪄁	𪄂	𪄃	𪄄	𪄅	𪄆	𪄇	𪄈	𪄉	𪄊	𪄋	𪄌	𪄍	𪄎	𪄏
U+2A11x	𪄐	𪄑	𪄒	𪄓	𪄔	𪄕	𪄖	𪄗	𪄘	𪄙	𪄚	𪄛	𪄜	𪄝	𪄞	𪄟
U+2A12x	𪄠	𪄡	𪄢	𪄣	𪄤	𪄥	𪄦	𪄧	𪄨	𪄩	𪄪	𪄫	𪄬	𪄭	𪄮	𪄯
U+2A13x	𪄰	𪄱	𪄲	𪄳	𪄴	𪄵	𪄶	𪄷	𪄸	𪄹	𪄺	𪄻	𪄼	𪄽	𪄾	𪄿
U+2A14x	𪅀	𪅁	𪅂	𪅃	𪅄	𪅅	𪅆	𪅇	𪅈	𪅉	𪅊	𪅋	𪅌	𪅍	𪅎	𪅏
U+2A15x	𪅐	𪅑	𪅒	𪅓	𪅔	𪅕	𪅖	𪅗	𪅘	𪅙	𪅚	𪅛	𪅜	𪅝	𪅞	𪅟
U+2A16x	𪅠	𪅡	𪅢	𪅣	𪅤	𪅥	𪅦	𪅧	𪅨	𪅩	𪅪	𪅫	𪅬	𪅭	𪅮	𪅯
U+2A17x	𪅰	𪅱	𪅲	𪅳	𪅴	𪅵	𪅶	𪅷	𪅸	𪅹	𪅺	𪅻	𪅼	𪅽	𪅾	𪅿
U+2A18x	𪆀	𪆁	𪆂	𪆃	𪆄	𪆅	𪆆	𪆇	𪆈	𪆉	𪆊	𪆋	𪆌	𪆍	𪆎	𪆏
U+2A19x	𪆐	𪆑	𪆒	𪆓	𪆔	𪆕	𪆖	𪆗	𪆘	𪆙	𪆚	𪆛	𪆜	𪆝	𪆞	𪆟
U+2A1Ax	𪆠	𪆡	𪆢	𪆣	𪆤	𪆥	𪆦	𪆧	𪆨	𪆩	𪆪	𪆫	𪆬	𪆭	𪆮	𪆯
U+2A1Bx	𪆰	𪆱	𪆲	𪆳	𪆴	𪆵	𪆶	𪆷	𪆸	𪆹	𪆺	𪆻	𪆼	𪆽	𪆾	𪆿
U+2A1Cx	𪇀	𪇁	𪇂	𪇃	𪇄	𪇅	𪇆	𪇇	𪇈	𪇉	𪇊	𪇋	𪇌	𪇍	𪇎	𪇏
U+2A1Dx	𪇐	𪇑	𪇒	𪇓	𪇔	𪇕	𪇖	𪇗	𪇘	𪇙	𪇚	𪇛	𪇜	𪇝	𪇞	𪇟
U+2A1Ex	𪇠	𪇡	𪇢	𪇣	𪇤	𪇥	𪇦	𪇧	𪇨	𪇩	𪇪	𪇫	𪇬	𪇭	𪇮	𪇯
U+2A1Fx	𪇰	𪇱	𪇲	𪇳	𪇴	𪇵	𪇶	𪇷	𪇸	𪇹	𪇺	𪇻	𪇼	𪇽	𪇾	𪇿
U+2A20x	𪈀	𪈁	𪈂	𪈃	𪈄	𪈅	𪈆	𪈇	𪈈	𪈉	𪈊	𪈋	𪈌	𪈍	𪈎	𪈏
U+2A21x	𪈐	𪈑	𪈒	𪈓	𪈔	𪈕	𪈖	𪈗	𪈘	𪈙	𪈚	𪈛	𪈜	𪈝	𪈞	𪈟
U+2A22x	𪈠	𪈡	𪈢	𪈣	𪈤	𪈥	𪈦	𪈧	𪈨	𪈩	𪈪	𪈫	𪈬	𪈭	𪈮	𪈯
U+2A23x	𪈰	𪈱	𪈲	𪈳	𪈴	𪈵	𪈶	𪈷	𪈸	𪈹	𪈺	𪈻	𪈼	𪈽	𪈾	𪈿
U+2A24x	𪉀	𪉁	𪉂	𪉃	𪉄	𪉅	𪉆	𪉇	𪉈	𪉉	𪉊	𪉋	𪉌	𪉍	𪉎	𪉏
U+2A25x	𪉐	𪉑	𪉒	𪉓	𪉔	𪉕	𪉖	𪉗	𪉘	𪉙	𪉚	𪉛	𪉜	𪉝	𪉞	𪉟
U+2A26x	𪉠	𪉡	𪉢	𪉣	𪉤	𪉥	𪉦	𪉧	𪉨	𪉩	𪉪	𪉫	𪉬	𪉭	𪉮	𪉯
U+2A27x	𪉰	𪉱	𪉲	𪉳	𪉴	𪉵	𪉶	𪉷	𪉸	𪉹	𪉺	𪉻	𪉼	𪉽	𪉾	𪉿
U+2A28x	𪊀	𪊁	𪊂	𪊃	𪊄	𪊅	𪊆	𪊇	𪊈	𪊉	𪊊	𪊋	𪊌	𪊍	𪊎	𪊏
U+2A29x	𪊐	𪊑	𪊒	𪊓	𪊔	𪊕	𪊖	𪊗	𪊘	𪊙	𪊚	𪊛	𪊜	𪊝	𪊞	𪊟
U+2A2Ax	𪊠	𪊡	𪊢	𪊣	𪊤	𪊥	𪊦	𪊧	𪊨	𪊩	𪊪	𪊫	𪊬	𪊭	𪊮	𪊯
U+2A2Bx	𪊰	𪊱	𪊲	𪊳	𪊴	𪊵	𪊶	𪊷	𪊸	𪊹	𪊺	𪊻	𪊼	𪊽	𪊾	𪊿
U+2A2Cx	𪋀	𪋁	𪋂	𪋃	𪋄	𪋅	𪋆	𪋇	𪋈	𪋉	𪋊	𪋋	𪋌	𪋍	𪋎	𪋏
U+2A2Dx	𪋐	𪋑	𪋒	𪋓	𪋔	𪋕	𪋖	𪋗	𪋘	𪋙	𪋚	𪋛	𪋜	𪋝	𪋞	𪋟
U+2A2Ex	𪋠	𪋡	𪋢	𪋣	𪋤	𪋥	𪋦	𪋧	𪋨	𪋩	𪋪	𪋫	𪋬	𪋭	𪋮	𪋯
U+2A2Fx	𪋰	𪋱	𪋲	𪋳	𪋴	𪋵	𪋶	𪋷	𪋸	𪋹	𪋺	𪋻	𪋼	𪋽	𪋾	𪋿
U+2A30x	𪌀	𪌁	𪌂	𪌃	𪌄	𪌅	𪌆	𪌇	𪌈	𪌉	𪌊	𪌋	𪌌	𪌍	𪌎	𪌏
U+2A31x	𪌐	𪌑	𪌒	𪌓	𪌔	𪌕	𪌖	𪌗	𪌘	𪌙	𪌚	𪌛	𪌜	𪌝	𪌞	𪌟
U+2A32x	𪌠	𪌡	𪌢	𪌣	𪌤	𪌥	𪌦	𪌧	𪌨	𪌩	𪌪	𪌫	𪌬	𪌭	𪌮	𪌯
U+2A33x	𪌰	𪌱	𪌲	𪌳	𪌴	𪌵	𪌶	𪌷	𪌸	𪌹	𪌺	𪌻	𪌼	𪌽	𪌾	𪌿
U+2A34x	𪍀	𪍁	𪍂	𪍃	𪍄	𪍅	𪍆	𪍇	𪍈	𪍉	𪍊	𪍋	𪍌	𪍍	𪍎	𪍏
U+2A35x	𪍐	𪍑	𪍒	𪍓	𪍔	𪍕	𪍖	𪍗	𪍘	𪍙	𪍚	𪍛	𪍜	𪍝	𪍞	𪍟
U+2A36x	𪍠	𪍡	𪍢	𪍣	𪍤	𪍥	𪍦	𪍧	𪍨	𪍩	𪍪	𪍫	𪍬	𪍭	𪍮	𪍯
U+2A37x	𪍰	𪍱	𪍲	𪍳	𪍴	𪍵	𪍶	𪍷	𪍸	𪍹	𪍺	𪍻	𪍼	𪍽	𪍾	𪍿
U+2A38x	𪎀	𪎁	𪎂	𪎃	𪎄	𪎅	𪎆	𪎇	𪎈	𪎉	𪎊	𪎋	𪎌	𪎍	𪎎	𪎏
U+2A39x	𪎐	𪎑	𪎒	𪎓	𪎔	𪎕	𪎖	𪎗	𪎘	𪎙	𪎚	𪎛	𪎜	𪎝	𪎞	𪎟
U+2A3Ax	𪎠	𪎡	𪎢	𪎣	𪎤	𪎥	𪎦	𪎧	𪎨	𪎩	𪎪	𪎫	𪎬	𪎭	𪎮	𪎯
U+2A3Bx	𪎰	𪎱	𪎲	𪎳	𪎴	𪎵	𪎶	𪎷	𪎸	𪎹	𪎺	𪎻	𪎼	𪎽	𪎾	𪎿
U+2A3Cx	𪏀	𪏁	𪏂	𪏃	𪏄	𪏅	𪏆	𪏇	𪏈	𪏉	𪏊	𪏋	𪏌	𪏍	𪏎	𪏏
U+2A3Dx	𪏐	𪏑	𪏒	𪏓	𪏔	𪏕	𪏖	𪏗	𪏘	𪏙	𪏚	𪏛	𪏜	𪏝	𪏞	𪏟
U+2A3Ex	𪏠	𪏡	𪏢	𪏣	𪏤	𪏥	𪏦	𪏧	𪏨	𪏩	𪏪	𪏫	𪏬	𪏭	𪏮	𪏯
U+2A3Fx	𪏰	𪏱	𪏲	𪏳	𪏴	𪏵	𪏶	𪏷	𪏸	𪏹	𪏺	𪏻	𪏼	𪏽	𪏾	𪏿
U+2A40x	𪐀	𪐁	𪐂	𪐃	𪐄	𪐅	𪐆	𪐇	𪐈	𪐉	𪐊	𪐋	𪐌	𪐍	𪐎	𪐏
U+2A41x	𪐐	𪐑	𪐒	𪐓	𪐔	𪐕	𪐖	𪐗	𪐘	𪐙	𪐚	𪐛	𪐜	𪐝	𪐞	𪐟
U+2A42x	𪐠	𪐡	𪐢	𪐣	𪐤	𪐥	𪐦	𪐧	𪐨	𪐩	𪐪	𪐫	𪐬	𪐭	𪐮	𪐯
U+2A43x	𪐰	𪐱	𪐲	𪐳	𪐴	𪐵	𪐶	𪐷	𪐸	𪐹	𪐺	𪐻	𪐼	𪐽	𪐾	𪐿
U+2A44x	𪑀	𪑁	𪑂	𪑃	𪑄	𪑅	𪑆	𪑇	𪑈	𪑉	𪑊	𪑋	𪑌	𪑍	𪑎	𪑏
U+2A45x	𪑐	𪑑	𪑒	𪑓	𪑔	𪑕	𪑖	𪑗	𪑘	𪑙	𪑚	𪑛	𪑜	𪑝	𪑞	𪑟
U+2A46x	𪑠	𪑡	𪑢	𪑣	𪑤	𪑥	𪑦	𪑧	𪑨	𪑩	𪑪	𪑫	𪑬	𪑭	𪑮	𪑯
U+2A47x	𪑰	𪑱	𪑲	𪑳	𪑴	𪑵	𪑶	𪑷	𪑸	𪑹	𪑺	𪑻	𪑼	𪑽	𪑾	𪑿
U+2A48x	𪒀	𪒁	𪒂	𪒃	𪒄	𪒅	𪒆	𪒇	𪒈	𪒉	𪒊	𪒋	𪒌	𪒍	𪒎	𪒏
U+2A49x	𪒐	𪒑	𪒒	𪒓	𪒔	𪒕	𪒖	𪒗	𪒘	𪒙	𪒚	𪒛	𪒜	𪒝	𪒞	𪒟
U+2A4Ax	𪒠	𪒡	𪒢	𪒣	𪒤	𪒥	𪒦	𪒧	𪒨	𪒩	𪒪	𪒫	𪒬	𪒭	𪒮	𪒯
U+2A4Bx	𪒰	𪒱	𪒲	𪒳	𪒴	𪒵	𪒶	𪒷	𪒸	𪒹	𪒺	𪒻	𪒼	𪒽	𪒾	𪒿
U+2A4Cx	𪓀	𪓁	𪓂	𪓃	𪓄	𪓅	𪓆	𪓇	𪓈	𪓉	𪓊	𪓋	𪓌	𪓍	𪓎	𪓏
U+2A4Dx	𪓐	𪓑	𪓒	𪓓	𪓔	𪓕	𪓖	𪓗	𪓘	𪓙	𪓚	𪓛	𪓜	𪓝	𪓞	𪓟
U+2A4Ex	𪓠	𪓡	𪓢	𪓣	𪓤	𪓥	𪓦	𪓧	𪓨	𪓩	𪓪	𪓫	𪓬	𪓭	𪓮	𪓯
U+2A4Fx	𪓰	𪓱	𪓲	𪓳	𪓴	𪓵	𪓶	𪓷	𪓸	𪓹	𪓺	𪓻	𪓼	𪓽	𪓾	𪓿
U+2A50x	𪔀	𪔁	𪔂	𪔃	𪔄	𪔅	𪔆	𪔇	𪔈	𪔉	𪔊	𪔋	𪔌	𪔍	𪔎	𪔏
U+2A51x	𪔐	𪔑	𪔒	𪔓	𪔔	𪔕	𪔖	𪔗	𪔘	𪔙	𪔚	𪔛	𪔜	𪔝	𪔞	𪔟
U+2A52x	𪔠	𪔡	𪔢	𪔣	𪔤	𪔥	𪔦	𪔧	𪔨	𪔩	𪔪	𪔫	𪔬	𪔭	𪔮	𪔯
U+2A53x	𪔰	𪔱	𪔲	𪔳	𪔴	𪔵	𪔶	𪔷	𪔸	𪔹	𪔺	𪔻	𪔼	𪔽	𪔾	𪔿
U+2A54x	𪕀	𪕁	𪕂	𪕃	𪕄	𪕅	𪕆	𪕇	𪕈	𪕉	𪕊	𪕋	𪕌	𪕍	𪕎	𪕏
U+2A55x	𪕐	𪕑	𪕒	𪕓	𪕔	𪕕	𪕖	𪕗	𪕘	𪕙	𪕚	𪕛	𪕜	𪕝	𪕞	𪕟
U+2A56x	𪕠	𪕡	𪕢	𪕣	𪕤	𪕥	𪕦	𪕧	𪕨	𪕩	𪕪	𪕫	𪕬	𪕭	𪕮	𪕯
U+2A57x	𪕰	𪕱	𪕲	𪕳	𪕴	𪕵	𪕶	𪕷	𪕸	𪕹	𪕺	𪕻	𪕼	𪕽	𪕾	𪕿
U+2A58x	𪖀	𪖁	𪖂	𪖃	𪖄	𪖅	𪖆	𪖇	𪖈	𪖉	𪖊	𪖋	𪖌	𪖍	𪖎	𪖏
U+2A59x	𪖐	𪖑	𪖒	𪖓	𪖔	𪖕	𪖖	𪖗	𪖘	𪖙	𪖚	𪖛	𪖜	𪖝	𪖞	𪖟
U+2A5Ax	𪖠	𪖡	𪖢	𪖣	𪖤	𪖥	𪖦	𪖧	𪖨	𪖩	𪖪	𪖫	𪖬	𪖭	𪖮	𪖯
U+2A5Bx	𪖰	𪖱	𪖲	𪖳	𪖴	𪖵	𪖶	𪖷	𪖸	𪖹	𪖺	𪖻	𪖼	𪖽	𪖾	𪖿
U+2A5Cx	𪗀	𪗁	𪗂	𪗃	𪗄	𪗅	𪗆	𪗇	𪗈	𪗉	𪗊	𪗋	𪗌	𪗍	𪗎	𪗏
U+2A5Dx	𪗐	𪗑	𪗒	𪗓	𪗔	𪗕	𪗖	𪗗	𪗘	𪗙	𪗚	𪗛	𪗜	𪗝	𪗞	𪗟
U+2A5Ex	𪗠	𪗡	𪗢	𪗣	𪗤	𪗥	𪗦	𪗧	𪗨	𪗩	𪗪	𪗫	𪗬	𪗭	𪗮	𪗯
U+2A5Fx	𪗰	𪗱	𪗲	𪗳	𪗴	𪗵	𪗶	𪗷	𪗸	𪗹	𪗺	𪗻	𪗼	𪗽	𪗾	𪗿
U+2A60x	𪘀	𪘁	𪘂	𪘃	𪘄	𪘅	𪘆	𪘇	𪘈	𪘉	𪘊	𪘋	𪘌	𪘍	𪘎	𪘏
U+2A61x	𪘐	𪘑	𪘒	𪘓	𪘔	𪘕	𪘖	𪘗	𪘘	𪘙	𪘚	𪘛	𪘜	𪘝	𪘞	𪘟
U+2A62x	𪘠	𪘡	𪘢	𪘣	𪘤	𪘥	𪘦	𪘧	𪘨	𪘩	𪘪	𪘫	𪘬	𪘭	𪘮	𪘯
U+2A63x	𪘰	𪘱	𪘲	𪘳	𪘴	𪘵	𪘶	𪘷	𪘸	𪘹	𪘺	𪘻	𪘼	𪘽	𪘾	𪘿
U+2A64x	𪙀	𪙁	𪙂	𪙃	𪙄	𪙅	𪙆	𪙇	𪙈	𪙉	𪙊	𪙋	𪙌	𪙍	𪙎	𪙏
U+2A65x	𪙐	𪙑	𪙒	𪙓	𪙔	𪙕	𪙖	𪙗	𪙘	𪙙	𪙚	𪙛	𪙜	𪙝	𪙞	𪙟
U+2A66x	𪙠	𪙡	𪙢	𪙣	𪙤	𪙥	𪙦	𪙧	𪙨	𪙩	𪙪	𪙫	𪙬	𪙭	𪙮	𪙯
U+2A67x	𪙰	𪙱	𪙲	𪙳	𪙴	𪙵	𪙶	𪙷	𪙸	𪙹	𪙺	𪙻	𪙼	𪙽	𪙾	𪙿
U+2A68x	𪚀	𪚁	𪚂	𪚃	𪚄	𪚅	𪚆	𪚇	𪚈	𪚉	𪚊	𪚋	𪚌	𪚍	𪚎	𪚏
U+2A69x	𪚐	𪚑	𪚒	𪚓	𪚔	𪚕	𪚖	𪚗	𪚘	𪚙	𪚚	𪚛	𪚜	𪚝	𪚞	𪚟
U+2A6Ax	𪚠	𪚡	𪚢	𪚣	𪚤	𪚥	𪚦	𪚧	𪚨	𪚩	𪚪	𪚫	𪚬	𪚭	𪚮	𪚯
U+2A6Bx	𪚰	𪚱	𪚲	𪚳	𪚴	𪚵	𪚶	𪚷	𪚸	𪚹	𪚺	𪚻	𪚼	𪚽	𪚾	𪚿
U+2A6Cx	𪛀	𪛁	𪛂	𪛃	𪛄	𪛅	𪛆	𪛇	𪛈	𪛉	𪛊	𪛋	𪛌	𪛍	𪛎	𪛏
U+2A6Dx	𪛐	𪛑	𪛒	𪛓	𪛔	𪛕	𪛖	𪛗	𪛘	𪛙	𪛚	𪛛	𪛜	𪛝	𪛞	𪛟
Notes 1.As of Unicode version 17.0

== History ==
The following Unicode-related documents record the purpose and process of defining specific characters in the CJK Unified Ideographs Extension B block:

Version	Final code points (Note: Proposed code points and characters names may differ from final code points and names)	Count	L2 ID	WG2 ID	IRG ID	Document
3.1	U+20000..2A6D6	42,711	L2/98-260			Ng, Nelson; Kung, Michael (1998-05-26), "CJK UNIFIED IDEOGRAPHS EXTENSION B", Report on IRG meeting #11
3.1	U+20000..2A6D6	42,711	L2/99-239			Addition of three hundred and fourteen KANJIs (from JIS X0213), 1999-07-15
3.1	U+20000..2A6D6	42,711	L2/99-310			Addition of three hundred and thirteen KANJIs (from JIS X0213), 1999-08-23
3.1	U+20000..2A6D6	42,711	L2/99-335	N2109	N674	Zhang, Zhoucai (1999-09-03), SuperCJK, version 9.0 with Kangxi and HYD data
3.1	U+20000..2A6D6	42,711	L2/99-336	N2105	N675	CJK Unified Ideographs Extension B WD 6.0, 1999-09-03
3.1	U+20000..2A6D6	42,711	L2/99-316			Whistler, Ken (1999-09-13), Comments on JCS proposal
3.1	U+20000..2A6D6	42,711	L2/99-312			excerpt of usages and sources of proposed KANJIs in contemporary Japanese, 1999-10-06
3.1	U+20000..2A6D6	42,711	L2/99-366			Suignard, Michel (1999-11-24), Text for CD ballot of ISO/IEC 10646 part 2
3.1	U+20000..2A6D6	42,711	L2/99-366.1			Cover page for N3393, 1999-11-24
3.1	U+20000..2A6D6	42,711	L2/99-366.2			Suignard, Michel (1999-11-24), Text of CD 10646-2
3.1	U+20000..2A6D6	42,711	L2/99-366.3			Suignard, Michel (1999-11-24), CJK Ext. B pages 001-100
3.1	U+20000..2A6D6	42,711	L2/99-366.4			Suignard, Michel (1999-11-24), CJK Ext. B pages 101-200
3.1	U+20000..2A6D6	42,711	L2/99-366.5			Suignard, Michel (1999-11-24), CJK Ext. B pages 201-300
3.1	U+20000..2A6D6	42,711	L2/99-366.6			Suignard, Michel (1999-11-24), CJK Ext. B pages 301-335
3.1	U+20000..2A6D6	42,711	L2/99-366.7			Suignard, Michel (1999-11-24), Special Purpose Plane and Annexes
3.1	U+20000..2A6D6	42,711	L2/99-366.8			Suignard, Michel (1999-11-24), Mapping of CJK Ext. B characters
3.1	U+20000..2A6D6	42,711	L2/99-385	N2144	N713R	Jenkins, John (1999-12-08), Clarification of the Non-Cognate Rule
3.1	U+20000..2A6D6	42,711	L2/00-010	N2103		Umamaheswaran, V. S. (2000-01-05), "10.3", Minutes of WG 2 meeting 37, Copenhagen, Denmark: 1999-09-13—16
3.1	U+20000..2A6D6	42,711	L2/00-021R (pdf, rtf)			ISO CD 10646 Part-2 vote -- A proposal to move JIS X 0213 Kanji characters on Extension-B into BMP, 2000-01-21
3.1	U+20000..2A6D6	42,711	L2/00-030			Enomoto, Yoshi (2000-01-31), Background of the proposal (for encoding of 302 ideographs from JIS X 0213)
3.1	U+20000..2A6D6	42,711	L2/00-036			Umamaheswaran, V. S.; Sargent, Murray (2000-02-03), Expert contribution on the placement of additional unified ideographs from JIS X0213, HK, and Korea
3.1	U+20000..2A6D6	42,711	L2/01-026 (pdf, doc)	N2298	N758	CJK Unified Ideographs Extension B, PreDIS R1 For ISO/IEC DIS 10646-2:2000, 2000-11-21
3.1	U+20000..2A6D6	42,711	L2/01-136	N2334 (pdf, doc)		Sato, T. K. (2001-03-28), Notification of an error and request for a correction regarding mapping information for a particular JIS X 0213 character in CJK UNIFIED IDEOGRAPHS EXTENSION-B
3.1	U+20000..2A6D6	42,711	L2/01-163	N2347	N785	CJK Unified Ideographs Extension B PreIS For ISO/IEC 10646-2:2000, 2001-03-30
3.1	U+20000..2A6D6	42,711	L2/01-162	N2349 (pdf, doc)	N787	Zhang, Zhoucai (2001-04-02), Clarification On Versions of CJK Unified Ideographs Extension B As Well As SuperCJK
3.1	U+20000..2A6D6	42,711	L2/02-122	N2427		Ksar, Mike (2002-03-18), Proposal to add 1 Hanja code of D P R of Korea into 10646-2:2001
3.1	U+20000..2A6D6	42,711	L2/02-201	N2448	N924	Error Correction, 2002-05-08
3.1	U+20000..2A6D6	42,711	L2/02-416	N2518		Proposal to add 2 hanja codes of D P R of Korea into 10646-2:2001, 2002-11-01
3.1	U+20000..2A6D6	42,711	L2/03-017			Late DPRK Comments on SC 2 N 3625, 10646-2: 2001/FPDAM 1, 2002-12-09
3.1	U+20000..2A6D6	42,711	L2/03-287			Cook, Richard (2003-08-24), 16 UniHan.txt errors
3.1	U+20000..2A6D6	42,711	L2/03-301			Cook, Richard (2003-08-27), 24 more UniHan.txt errors
3.1	U+20000..2A6D6	42,711	L2/03-311			West, Andrew (2003-09-17), Unicode 4.0.1 Beta Review, comments from Andrew C. West
3.1	U+20000..2A6D6	42,711	L2/03-399			Fok, Anthony (2003-10-13), Unihan reported errors / changes re kHKSCS entries
3.1	U+20000..2A6D6	42,711	L2/03-398			Nguyen, D. (2003-10-29), Unihan reported errors / changes re kCowles
3.1	U+20000..2A6D6	42,711	L2/03-453			Minutes of the Editorial Group Ad Hoc Discussion, 2003-12-17
3.1	U+20000..2A6D6	42,711	L2/04-008	N2695	N1026	China's confirmation on fonts for CJK_B 21E2D and 21E45, 2004-01-05
3.1	U+20000..2A6D6	42,711	L2/04-208	N2774R	N1064	Proposal to add 6 KP source references to existing CJK Unified Ideographs, 2004-05-25
3.1	U+20000..2A6D6	42,711	L2/04-281	N2830		Suignard, Michel (2004-06-23), CJK Ideograph source visual references information
3.1	U+20000..2A6D6	42,711	L2/04-417			Cook, Richard (2004-11-18), Extension B font versioning: preliminary work
3.1	U+20000..2A6D6	42,711	L2/05-022			Cook, Richard (2005-01-25), Extension B font versioning: follow-up report, part 1 [text]
3.1	U+20000..2A6D6	42,711	L2/05-023			Cook, Richard (2005-01-25), Extension B font versioning: follow-up report, part 2 [tables]
3.1	U+20000..2A6D6	42,711		N3353 (pdf, doc)		Umamaheswaran, V. S. (2007-10-10), "M51.9", Unconfirmed minutes of WG 2 meeting 51 Hanzhou, China; 2007-04-24/27
3.1	U+20000..2A6D6	42,711	L2/07-208	N3285		Proposal to replace 11 KP source references to existing ISO/IEC 10646:2003, 2007-07-18
3.1	U+20000..2A6D6	42,711	L2/08-234		N1406	Cook, Richard; Bishop, Thomas; Lunde, Ken (2008-06-06), Han Unification Issues
3.1	U+20000..2A6D6	42,711	L2/08-310			Cook, Richard (2008-08-12), Fonts for Extension B and C and IRG
3.1	U+20000..2A6D6	42,711	L2/10-215			Lunde, Ken (2010-06-22), "Hanyo-Denshi" IVD Collection (PRI 167) to Adobe-Japan1-6 Mapping Table
3.1	U+20000..2A6D6	42,711		N3903 (pdf, doc)		"M57.07 (CJK Ext. B glyphs from 2nd edition)", Unconfirmed minutes of WG2 meeting 57, 2011-03-31
3.1	U+20000..2A6D6	42,711	L2/11-243	N4111		Sources for Orphaned CJK Ideographs, 2011-06-14
3.1	U+20000..2A6D6	42,711	L2/11-254			Constable, Peter (2011-06-20), "Update to UTR #45 U-Source Ideographs requested", UTC Liaison Report from WG2
3.1	U+20000..2A6D6	42,711		N4103		"Resolution 58.05", Unconfirmed minutes of WG 2 meeting 58, 2012-01-03
3.1	U+20000..2A6D6	42,711	L2/14-260	N4621		Suignard, Michel (2014-10-23), CJK chart and source references update
3.1	U+20000..2A6D6	42,711	L2/16-052	N4603 (pdf, doc)		Umamaheswaran, V. S. (2015-09-01), "M63.05", Unconfirmed minutes of WG 2 meeting 63
3.1	U+20000..2A6D6	42,711	L2/17-180		N2202	Chan, Eiso (2017-06-02), Request for consideration to add kIRG_GSource values to thirteen ideographs and change two G-source glyphs for the Table of General Standard Chinese Characters [Affects U+20164]
3.1	U+20000..2A6D6	42,711	L2/17-362			Moore, Lisa (2018-02-02), "Consensus 153-C16", UTC #153 Minutes
3.1	U+20000..2A6D6	42,711		N4974	N2301	Request of TCA's Horizontal Extension for Chemical Terminology [Affects U+20BBF, U+20C02, U+20CED, U+26B4C, U+26CBE, U+26E3D, U+28834, U+289A1, U+289C0, U+28A0F, and U+28B46], 2018-06-12
3.1	U+20000..2A6D6	42,711		N4987		Proposal on China's Horizontal Extension for 14 CJK Ideographs [Affects U+20164, 24A7D, 25ED7, 2677C and 26C21], 2018-06-13
3.1	U+20000..2A6D6	42,711		N4988		Proposal on Updating 11 G glyphs of CJK Unified Ideographs to ISO/IEC 10646 [Affects U+21D4C, 2278B, 23AB8 and 2459B], 2018-06-13
3.1	U+20000..2A6D6	42,711			N2336	Modify the G glyph for U+23517, 2018-09-10
3.1	U+20000..2A6D6	42,711		N5016	N2349	Shin, Sanghyun; Cho, Sungduk; Pyo, Seungju; Kim, Kyongsok (2018-12-13), Request to move character K6-1022 in Horizontal Extension of KS X 1027-5 from U+3EAC to U+248F2
3.1	U+20000..2A6D6	42,711		N5020 (pdf, doc)		Umamaheswaran, V. S. (2019-01-11), "10.4.6, 10.4.8, and 10.4.9", Unconfirmed minutes of WG 2 meeting 67
3.1	U+20000..2A6D6	42,711		N5086	N2379	Proposal of China's horizontal extension for technical used characters [Affects U+23496, U+2355E, U+236ED, U+24726, U+26FE1, U+27334 and U+2A38C], 2019-05-10
3.1	U+20000..2A6D6	42,711	L2/19-237	N5068		Editorial Report on Miscellaneous Issues (meeting IRG#52) [Affects U+23517, U+248F2, and U+26657], 2019-05-17
3.1	U+20000..2A6D6	42,711	L2/19-244	N5107		TCA's UNC Proposal for WG2 submission [Affects U+27C0E], 2019-05-24
3.1	U+20000..2A6D6	42,711	L2/19-241	N5083	N2391	Errata report for WG2 submission_TCA [Affects U+26657], 2019-05-31
3.1	U+20000..2A6D6	42,711		N5082		Updated G Font of U+23517, 2019-05-31
3.1	U+20000..2A6D6	42,711	L2/21-163		N2508	Request for Glyph Change in the H-column of the ISO/IEC 10646 Standard [Affects 22ACF], 2021-08-25
3.1	U+20000..2A6D6	42,711	L2/21-173			Lunde, Ken (2021-09-29), CJK & Unihan Group Recommendations for UTC #169 Meeting [Affects 22ACF]
3.1	U+20000..2A6D6	42,711	L2/22-077		N2512R	Shin, SangHyun; Cho, Sungduk; Kim, Kyongsok (2021-11-02), A revised proposal requesting a Horizontal Extension of 51 Hanja chars (previously submitted for ExtF/G/H) [Affects U+20048, 20A1C, 21A5F, 21C08, 21FBA, 23392, 23F4E, 25D20, 26E30, 27BF8, 28633, 28E9A, 29760, and 2A60F]
3.1	U+20000..2A6D6	42,711	L2/21-228		N2520	West, Andrew (2021-11-15), Request to move the source reference for UK-02830 [Affects U+238A7]
3.1	U+20000..2A6D6	42,711	L2/22-022			Lunde, Ken (2022-01-26), "10 [Affects U+238A7]", CJK & Unihan Group Recommendations for UTC #170 Meeting
3.1	U+20000..2A6D6	42,711	L2/22-016			Constable, Peter (2022-04-21), "E.1 10 [Affects U+238A7]", UTC #170 Minutes
3.1	U+20000..2A6D6	42,711	L2/22-067			Lunde, Ken (2022-04-16), "03 [Affects U+23D8F, 27C4F and 28B02], 08 [Affects U+2143F], 19 [Affects U+20048, 20A1C, 21A5F, 21C08, 21FBA, 23392, 23F4E, 25D20, 26E30, 27BF8, 28633, 28E9A, 29760, and 2A60F]", CJK & Unihan Group Recommendations for UTC #171 Meeting
3.1	U+20000..2A6D6	42,711	L2/22-061			Constable, Peter (2022-07-27), "E.1 Section 03 [Affects U+23D8F, 27C4F and 28B02], E.1 Section 08 [Affects U+2143F], E.1 Section 19 [Affects U+20048, 20A1C, 21A5F, 21C08, 21FBA, 23392, 23F4E, 25D20, 26E30, 27BF8, 28633, 28E9A, 29760, and 2A60F]", Approved Minutes of UTC Meeting 171
3.1	U+20000..2A6D6	42,711	L2/22-238			Bai, Yi; Sim, CheonHyeong (2022-10-16), Proposal to consider adding CodeCharts support for kIRG_KPSource representative glyphs [Affects U+23CC0, 23CD9, 249D6, 249E8, and 24D6A]
3.1	U+20000..2A6D6	42,711	L2/22-256		N2580R	T-Source Glyph Correction and Horizontal Extension [Affects U+2486F], 2022-10-18
3.1	U+20000..2A6D6	42,711	L2/22-259		N2556R2	Chan, Eiso; Collins, Lee; Việt, Ngô Trung (2022-10-20), IRGN2556R2 V-Source Glyph and Codes Updates [Affects U+20302, 2087A, 20C00, 230B7, 2339E, 236EF, 237C3, 23B87, 23E5E, 2585E, 29516, 26A5A, 26A5B, 26A73, 26A82, 26A83, 26A90, 26AA6, 26AA8, 26AD8, 27350, 279F8, and 284A3]
3.1	U+20000..2A6D6	42,711	L2/22-247			Lunde, Ken (2022-11-01), "03) 2022-08-08 07:25:17 CDT [Affects 29530], 24) L2/22-256, 26) L2/22-259, and 35) L2/22-238", CJK & Unihan Group Recommendations for UTC #173 Meeting
3.1	U+20000..2A6D6	42,711	L2/22-241			Constable, Peter (2022-11-09), "E.1 03) 2022-08-08 07:25:17 CDT, E.1 24) L2/22-256, E.1 26) L2/22-259, and E.1 35) L2/22-238", Approved Minutes of UTC Meeting 173
3.1	U+20000..2A6D6	42,711	L2/23-011			Lunde, Ken (2023-01-11), "11) L2/22-238: Proposal to consider adding CodeCharts support for kIRG_KPSource representative glyphs [Affects U+23CC0, 23CD9, 249D6, 249E8, and 24D6A]", CJK & Unihan Group Recommendations for UTC #174 Meeting
3.1	U+20000..2A6D6	42,711	L2/23-086		N2588R	Shin, SangHyun; Kim, Kyongsok; Pyo, Seungju (2023-02-03), A revised proposal requesting a Horizontal Extension of 150 Hanja chars [Affects 134 code points]
3.1	U+20000..2A6D6	42,711	L2/23-089		N2609	Chung, Jaemin (2023-03-15), G glyphs for U+25D89 and U+28BBA
3.1	U+20000..2A6D6	42,711	L2/23-082			Lunde, Ken (2023-04-22), "28 [Affects 134 code points]", CJK & Unihan Group Recommendations for UTC #175 Meeting
3.1	U+20000..2A6D6	42,711	L2/23-076			Constable, Peter (2023-05-01), "E.1 Section 27 [Affects U+25D89 and U+28BBA] and E.1 Section 28:[Affects 134 code points]", UTC #175 Minutes
3.1	U+20000..2A6D6	42,711	L2/23-245		N2642	Jiang, Kushim (2023-09-16), Proposal to update the reference glyphs for 3 characters [Affects U+203D8 and 25B9F]
3.1	U+20000..2A6D6	42,711	L2/23-242		N2651	Proposal to Change Glyph of U+21128, 2023-10-16
3.1	U+20000..2A6D6	42,711	L2/23-237R			Lunde, Ken (2023-11-02), "20 [Affects U+21128] and 22 [Affects U+203D8 and 25B9F]", CJK & Unihan Group Recommendations for UTC #177 Meeting
3.1	U+20000..2A6D6	42,711	L2/23-231			Constable, Peter (2023-12-08), "Section 20 [Affects U+21128] and Section 22 [Affects U+203D8 and 25B9F]", UTC #177 Minutes
3.1	U+20000..2A6D6	42,711	L2/24-227R			Lunde, Ken (2024-10-30), "06 [Affects U+277B0]", CJK & Unihan Working Group Recommendations for UTC #181 Meeting
3.1	U+20000..2A6D6	42,711	L2/24-221			Constable, Peter (2024-11-12), "Consensus 181-C15", UTC #181 Minutes, "Accept the proposal to correct the T-source representative glyph for U+277B0"
3.1	U+20000..2A6D6	42,711			N2779R2	T-Source Glyph Modification and Horizontal Extension [Affects U+2752C and others], 2025-03-06
3.1	U+20000..2A6D6	42,711	L2/25-090			Lunde, Ken (2025-04-11), "Section 26 and 30 [Affects U+2752C and others]", CJK & Unihan Working Group Recommendations for UTC Meeting #183
13.0	U+2A6D7..2A6DD	7	L2/17-087			Chan, Eiso; Wang, Xiaolei; Le, Hou; You, Jerry (2017-04-03), Proposal to encode characters for Gongche Notation
13.0	U+2A6D7..2A6DD	7	L2/17-103			Moore, Lisa (2017-05-18), "E.5", UTC #151 Minutes
13.0	U+2A6D7..2A6DD	7	L2/18-063		N2296	Lunde, Ken (2018-02-22), Proposal to remove the UCS2003 representative glyphs from the Extension B code charts
13.0	U+2A6D7..2A6DD	7			N2299	Chan, Eiso (2018-04-22), Request to discuss how to handle seven unencoded Gongche characters for Kunqu Opera
13.0	U+2A6D7..2A6DD	7	L2/18-168			Anderson, Deborah; Whistler, Ken; Pournader, Roozbeh; Moore, Lisa; Liang, Hai; Chapman, Chris; Cook, Richard (2018-04-28), "24. Extension B", Recommendations to UTC #155 April-May 2018 on Script Proposals
13.0	U+2A6D7..2A6DD	7	L2/18-245	N4967		Chan, Eiso; You, Jerry; Wang, Xiaolei; Le, Hou (2018-06-01), Updated proposal on Gongche characters for Kunqu Opera
13.0	U+2A6D7..2A6DD	7	L2/18-241			Anderson, Deborah; et al. (2018-07-20), "17", Recommendations to UTC # 156 July 2018 on Script Proposals
13.0	U+2A6D7..2A6DD	7	L2/18-183			Moore, Lisa (2018-11-20), "B.4.1", UTC #156 Minutes
13.0	U+2A6D7..2A6DD	7		N5020 (pdf, doc)		Umamaheswaran, V. S. (2019-01-11), "10.2.3", Unconfirmed minutes of WG 2 meeting 67
13.0	U+2A6D7..2A6DD	7		N5122		"M68.01", Unconfirmed minutes of WG 2 meeting 68, 2019-12-31
13.0	U+2A6D7..2A6DD	7	L2/19-243	N5106		Suignard, Michel (2019-06-20), "Gongche", Disposition of comments on ISO/IEC CD.2 10646 6th edition
13.0	U+2A6D7..2A6DD	7	L2/19-270			Moore, Lisa (2019-10-07), "Consensus 160-C9", UTC #160 Minutes
13.0	U+2A6D7..2A6DD	7	L2/20-080			Lunde, Ken (2020-03-16), Proposal to remove the UCS2003 representative glyphs from the Extension B code charts - Redux
13.0	U+2A6D7..2A6DD	7	L2/20-102			Moore, Lisa (2020-05-06), "Consensus 163-C12", UTC #163 Minutes
14.0	U+2A6DE..2A6DF	2	L2/20-203	N5140	N2437	Submission of 5 Macao SARG UNC Characters and One TCA UNC character, 2020-08-08
14.0	U+2A6DE..2A6DF	2	L2/20-235			Lunde, Ken (2020-09-22), "4)UAX #38 / Unihan Database Documents", Unihan Ad Hoc Recommendations for UTC #165 Meeting
14.0	U+2A6DE..2A6DF	2	L2/20-237			Moore, Lisa (2020-10-27), "Consensus 165-C9", UTC #165 Minutes
